= Changan Automobile =

Chinese state-owned automobile manufacturer

China Changan Automobile Group Co., Ltd.
- Type: State-owned
- ISIN: CNE000000R36
- Industry: Automotive
- Founded: 1862; 164 years ago
- Headquarters: Jiangbei, Chongqing, China
- Area served: Worldwide
- Key people: Zhu Huarong (chairman); Zhao Fei (general manager)
- Products: Motor vehicles
- Production output: 2,913,177 (2025)
- Parent: SASAC
- Subsidiaries: Deepal (51%); Changan Ford (50%); Changan Mazda (50%); Avatr Technology (40.99%)

Chinese name
- Simplified Chinese: 中国长安汽车集团有限公司
- Traditional Chinese: 中國長安汽車集團有限公司
- Literal meaning: China Changan Automobile Group Limited Corporation
Transcriptions
Standard Mandarin
- Hanyu Pinyin: Zhōngguó Cháng'ān Qìchē Jítuán Yǒuxiàn Gōngsī

Alternative Chinese name
- Simplified Chinese: 中国长安汽车
- Traditional Chinese: 中國長安汽車
- Literal meaning: China Changan Automobile
Transcriptions
Standard Mandarin
- Hanyu Pinyin: Zhōngguó Cháng'ān Qìchē

Second alternative Chinese name
- Simplified Chinese: 长安汽车
- Traditional Chinese: 長安汽車
- Literal meaning: Changan Automobile
Transcriptions
Standard Mandarin
- Hanyu Pinyin: Cháng'ān Qìchē
- Website: www.ccag.cn www.changan.com.cn

China Changan Automobile Group Co., Ltd. (CCAG) is a Chinese central state-owned automobile manufacturer headquartered in Jiangbei, Chongqing. The group traces its origins to 1862, when Li Hongzhang established the Shanghai Foreign Gun Bureau as a military supply factory. It did not become an automobile manufacturer until 1959, when the factory was repurposed to produce the Changjiang Type 46 jeep.

The group produces and sells vehicles under its own brands — including Avatr, Deepal, Changan, and Kaicene — as well as through foreign-branded joint ventures such as Changan Ford and Changan Mazda. In 2021, its own brands accounted for 76% of sales (1.75 million units, including 1.2 million passenger vehicles). Its principal activities are the production of passenger cars, microvans, commercial vans, and light trucks. A subsidiary, Chongqing Changan Automobile Co., Ltd. (SZSE: 000625), is listed on the Shenzhen Stock Exchange.

== Etymology ==
The name "Changan" originated from "Chongqing Changan Arsenal", the predecessor defence-industry entity established in the 1950s, and literally means "long-lasting peace". Chang'an is also the name of the ancient Chinese capital of the Tang dynasty.

The name was first applied to a commercial vehicle with the SC112 mini truck, based on the Suzuki Carry introduced from Japan in the 1980s.

== History ==
Changan's origins trace to 1862 when Li Hongzhang established the Shanghai Foreign Gun Bureau as a military supply factory. In 1863 it was renamed the Suzhou Arsenal, and by 1865 Li relocated it to Nanjing, where it grew into the largest arsenal in China at the time, known as the Jinling Arsenal. By 1899 the Jinling Arsenal had become a major arms production centre equipped with nearly a thousand machines and employing 1,700 artisans, consolidating its position as one of China's primary military manufacturing hubs. When the Second Sino-Japanese War broke out in 1937 and Nanjing faced imminent threat, the Nationalist government relocated the Jinling Arsenal westward to Chongqing, where it was renamed the 21st Arsenal.

In 1951 the 21st Arsenal was renamed State-Owned Factory 456 under the Central Bureau of Military Industry, aligning it with the administrative framework of the newly established People's Republic of China. In 1959 a predecessor entity, Chongqing Changan Arsenal, began automobile manufacturing under government contract and produced the Changjiang Type 46, China's first domestically manufactured production vehicle. In 1984 Changan entered a new phase by signing a technical cooperation agreement with Suzuki Motor Corporation of Japan focused on mini vehicles and engines. On 15 November 1984, the first batch of Changan-branded vehicles — the SC112 mini van and SC110 mini truck — rolled off the production line, marking the company's official transition from a military enterprise to a civilian vehicle manufacturer.

In 2009 Changan acquired two smaller domestic automakers, Hafei and Changhe. In 2013 Changhe was transferred to the Jiangxi provincial government for restructuring, and later became a majority-owned subsidiary of BAIC Group. As of 2010, China Weaponry Equipment was the parent company of Changan, and that year Changan became the fourth-largest car manufacturer in the Chinese automobile industry by selling 2.38 million units. In 2010 Changan also released a new logo for its consumer vehicle range; commercial production retained the former red-arch branding. Changan produced over 2 million vehicles in 2011, placing it fourth among domestic automakers.

In 2012, 72% of production was attributed to passenger vehicles, though this figure likely conflates passenger cars with microvans and light commercial vehicles, which are commercially distinct but sometimes grouped in Chinese industry statistics. In November 2012, Changan Ford Mazda Automobile was divided into two separate joint ventures, Changan Ford and Changan Mazda, as part of Ford's divestment from Mazda. In October 2017 Changan announced plans to end production of vehicles powered solely by internal-combustion engines by 2025, after which it would sell only plug-in hybrids and battery electric vehicles, citing regulatory pressure and China's commitments under the Paris Agreement. In November 2023 Huawei announced plans to move core technologies from its smart car unit into a new joint venture with Changan. The resulting brand, Avatr Technology, engages in research, development, production, sales, and servicing of intelligent automotive systems and components. Changan and its affiliates hold up to 40% of the new company's equity.

On 9 February 2025, Changan Automobile and Dongfeng Motor both announced they were exploring potential mergers with unnamed state-owned enterprises, sparking speculation that the two groups would be combined with Dongfeng as the dominant partner. On 4 June 2025, both companies announced that merger plans had been abandoned. On 5 June 2025 the State Council announced that the automotive business of China South Industries Group Corporation, namely Changan Automobile, would be spun off as an independent central state-owned enterprise directly under the State-owned Assets Supervision and Administration Commission of the State Council (SASAC). The spin-off formally severed Changan's long-standing ties to its military-industrial background and elevated it to sub-ministerial-level enterprise status. In July 2025, China Changan Automobile Group Co., Ltd. was formally established as a new independent legal entity, becoming the 100th central state-owned enterprise and the third automotive enterprise under SASAC, as well as the first central state-owned enterprise domiciled in Chongqing. The company was registered in Chongqing with registered capital of 20 billion yuan. Zhu Huarong, former president of Changan Automobile, was appointed legal representative and chairman by SASAC. The founding ceremony was held in Chongqing on 29 July 2025.

In June 2026, Changan Automobile and BAIC Group signed a strategic cooperation agreement to jointly develop autonomous driving technologies, pursue joint component procurement, co-develop new vehicle models, and build shared overseas sales channels. The agreement does not involve equity investment by either party.

== International expansions ==
=== Russia ===
In 2013, Changan signed a cooperation agreement with Russian distributor Irito, targeting sales of 12,000 units in 2014; actual sales fell far short of that figure. Between 2016 and 2019, Changan assembled the CS35 at Irito's Motorinvest facility in Lipetsk, and in 2020–2021 the CS35 and CS75 were also assembled at Unison in Belarus. The Irito partnership produced limited commercial results, and sales began accelerating only after Changan established direct distribution in 2020.

With major European, Japanese, South Korean, and American carmakers leaving the Russian market following Russia's invasion of Ukraine in February 2022, Changan rapidly expanded its model range and distribution network. Annual sales grew from modest pre-2022 levels to 11,267 units in 2023 and approximately 103,000 units in 2024, making Changan the fourth-largest brand in the Russian market behind Haval, Chery, and Geely. In early 2026, mass production of Changan models commenced at the Avtotor plant in Kaliningrad, beginning with the CS35 Max and CS75 Plus crossovers, localising final assembly to reduce logistics costs and mitigate the impact of Russia's escalating vehicle recycling fees.

=== Europe ===
Changan had maintained a European R&D and design presence since 2003, when it established a design centre in Turin, Italy. A further design centre was opened in Birmingham, United Kingdom, and since 2024 the company has operated a design and engineering function in Germany. In September 2024, Changan registered Changan Automobile Deutschland GmbH in Munich, designated as the European sales headquarters, and simultaneously registered Changan Automobile Europe Holding B.V. in the Netherlands as the regional corporate holding entity.

After its planned brand launch event in Milan in October 2024 was cancelled at short notice amid tensions in the EU–China trade dispute over tariff investigations into Chinese-made electric vehicles, the European brand launch was held in Mainz, Germany, on 21 March 2025. The event introduced three Changan brands to Europe, Deepal, the core Changan brand, and Avatr. Changan stated its plan to be present in all major European markets by 2028, with a planned total investment of two billion euros in the region by 2030 and a target of eight new models across its three brands by 2027.

Changan's head of European marketing confirmed in July 2025 that the company was actively scouting factory sites within Europe, stating its intent to establish local manufacturing for the European market.

Changan Automobile established a prominent global strategic partnership in Portugal by becoming the official partner of the Portuguese Football Federation (FPF) in May 2026.

=== Pakistan ===
Changan has built a production facility in Karachi, Pakistan. It is a joint venture with Master Motors with an investment of US$100 million. This plant makes right hand drive passenger vehicles for Pakistan as well other right hand drive markets. The first "Made in Pakistan" unit of Changan rolled out on 2 May 2019. With a manufacturing capacity of 30,000 cars per year, this facility is Changan's first to produce right hand drive cars.

=== Thailand ===
In 2023, Changan established its Southeast Asia business unit and set up three local operating entities: Changan Auto Southeast Asia Co., Ltd., Changan Auto Sales (Thailand) Co., Ltd., and Changan Thailand Auto Parts. On 27 November 2023, the company held its Southeast Asia brand launch event in Bangkok. The Deepal L07 and S07 were officially launched at the 40th Thailand International Motor Expo later that week, attracting more than 3,000 orders within the first two weeks.

Construction of a manufacturing facility commenced simultaneously at the WHA Eastern Seaboard Industrial Estate 4 in Rayong Province, with an initial investment of 10 billion baht (approximately US$280 million) for a first-phase annual capacity of 100,000 vehicles, with plans to expand to 200,000 units in a second phase. The plant commenced production on 15 May 2025, with the Deepal S05 as the first model to roll off the line. The Rayong facility serves as Changan's primary right-hand-drive manufacturing hub, supplying vehicles for ASEAN markets as well as Australia, New Zealand, and South Africa.

=== Australia ===
Changan began preparing its Australian operations from late 2024, appointing a local general manager and recruiting support staff for a Sydney-based subsidiary. The Deepal S07 was launched in Australia on 8 November 2024, distributed through Inchcape, one of the world's largest automotive distribution groups. Changan models for Australia are manufactured at Changan's Rayong plant in Thailand.

=== Indonesia ===
On 21 February 2025, Changan signed a distributor agreement with PT Indomobil Sukses Internasional, one of Indonesia's largest automotive distribution groups. The brand was officially launched at the Gaikindo Jakarta Auto Week (GJAW) on 21 November 2025 with the Deepal S07 and Changan Lumin as the first models offered in the country.

=== Brazil ===
==== The Chana and Districar Era (2006–2016) ====
The brand debuted in Brazil in 2006, represented by the Portuguese-Brazilian group "Districar."

- Name and Positioning: Initially, the brand used the name "Chana," focusing on light commercial vehicles and minivans (such as the Chana Family and the Star pickup truck).
- Name Transition: In 2011, as part of a repositioning effort—and to avoid pejorative connotations associated with the original name in the Portuguese language—the brand officially adopted its global name, "Changan," in Brazil.
- Exit from the Market: Due to economic instability, exchange rate fluctuations, and an increase in the IPI (federal excise tax) on imported vehicles (under the "Inovar-Auto" program), Districar gradually wound down the brand's operations around 2016.

==== Alliance with the CAOA Group (2025–Present) ====
In 2025, Changan signed an agreement with Brazilian manufacturer CAOA and formed CAOA Changan to sellits cars on Brazil. CAOA has a history of partnership with foreign brands that starts operations in Brazil, like Renault, Hyundai and Chery.

Unlike the previous phase, which focused on simple importation, the new partnership entails domestic production at the CAOA plant in Anápolis (Goiás) starting in 2026. The brand is expected to fill the volume gap left by the restructuring of CAOA’s partnership with Hyundai.

== Leadership ==
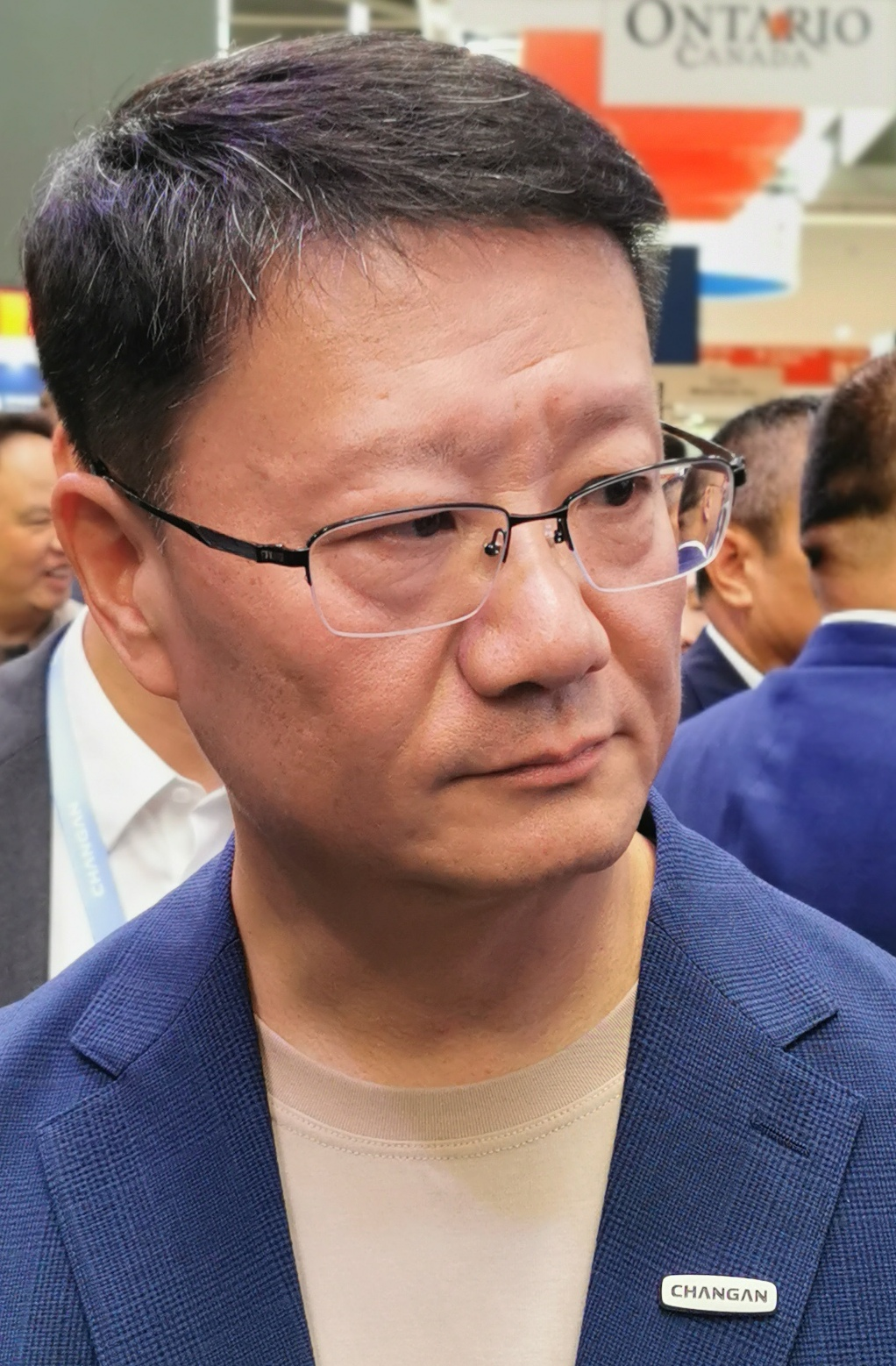
General Manager Zhao Fei (2025) at the International Motor Show Germany in Munich

=== Chairman ===
- Xu Liuping (2006–2017)
- Zhang Baolin (2017–2020)
- Zhu Huarong (2020–present)

=== Presidents ===
- Xu Liuping (2006–2010)
- Zhu Huarong (2010–2020)
- Wang Jun (2020–2025)

=== General managers ===
- Zhao Fei (2025–present)

== Brands and products ==
Changan produces and markets vehicles primarily under five brands:

- Changan Auto for SUVs and passenger cars
  - Changan Nevo (Chinese: 长安启源; pinyin: Cháng'ān Qǐyuán) for entry-level premium range-extended electric vehicles
- Deepal (Chinese: 深蓝; pinyin: Shēnlán) for electric vehicles
- Avatr for premium electric vehicles, jointly invested with CATL
- Kaicene (Chinese: 长安凯程; pinyin: Cháng'ān Kǎichéng) for commercial vehicles, light trucks, and MPVs

=== Changan Auto ===
Changan Auto logo

Changan Auto is the main brand of China Changan Automobile Group, covering entry-level to mid-range passenger vehicles including cars, SUVs, and pickups.

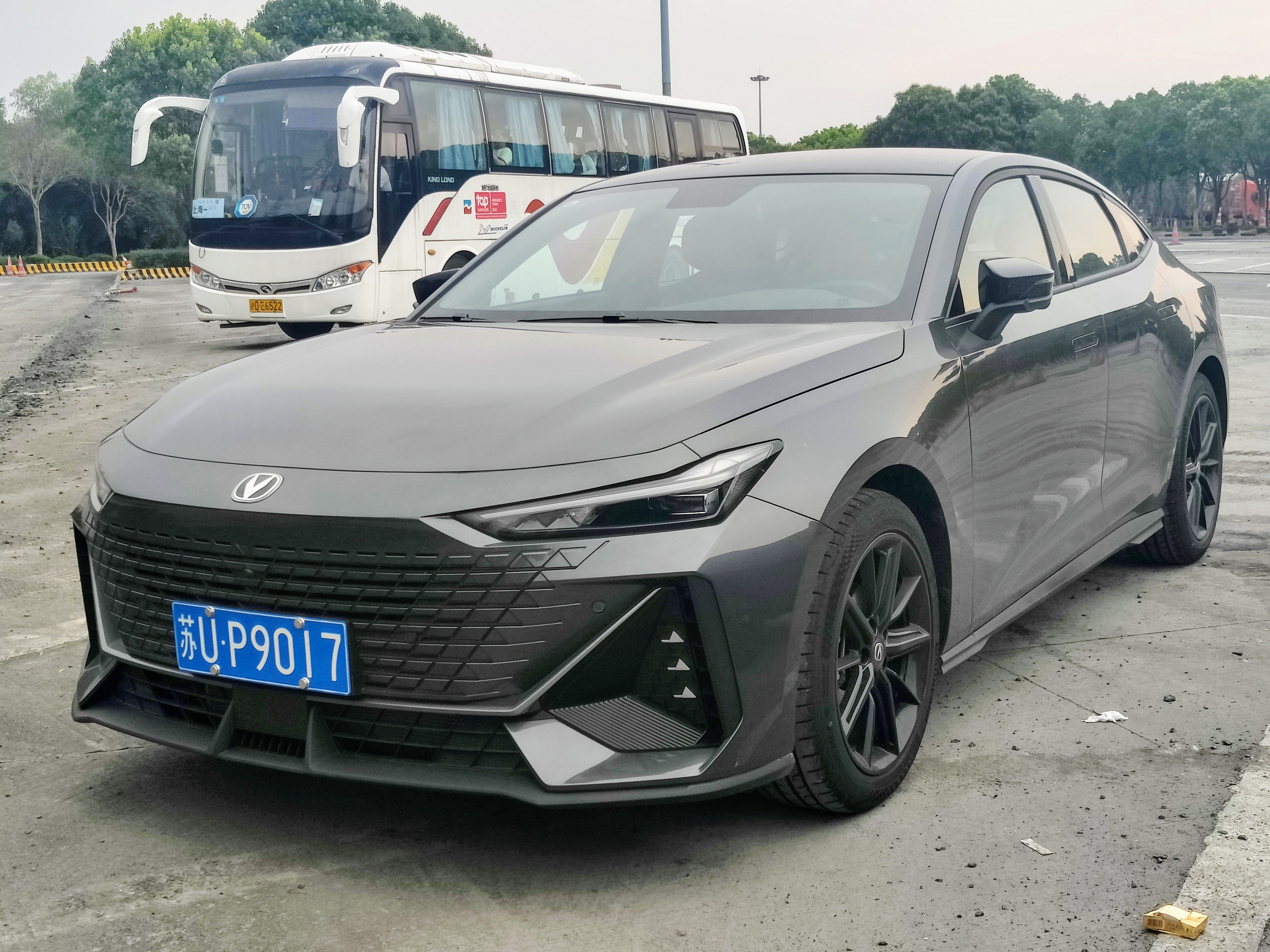
Changan UNI-V

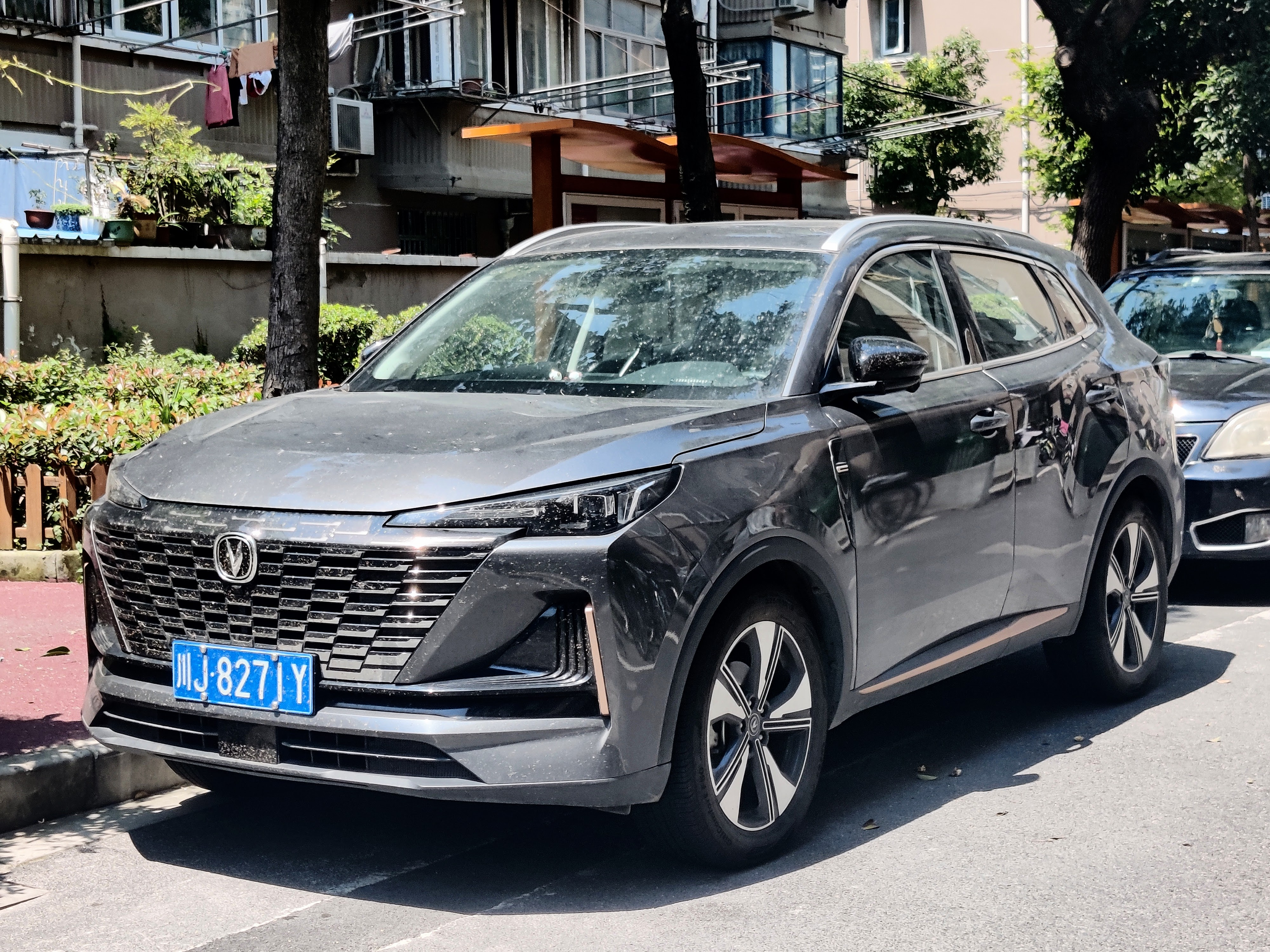
Changan CS55 Plus

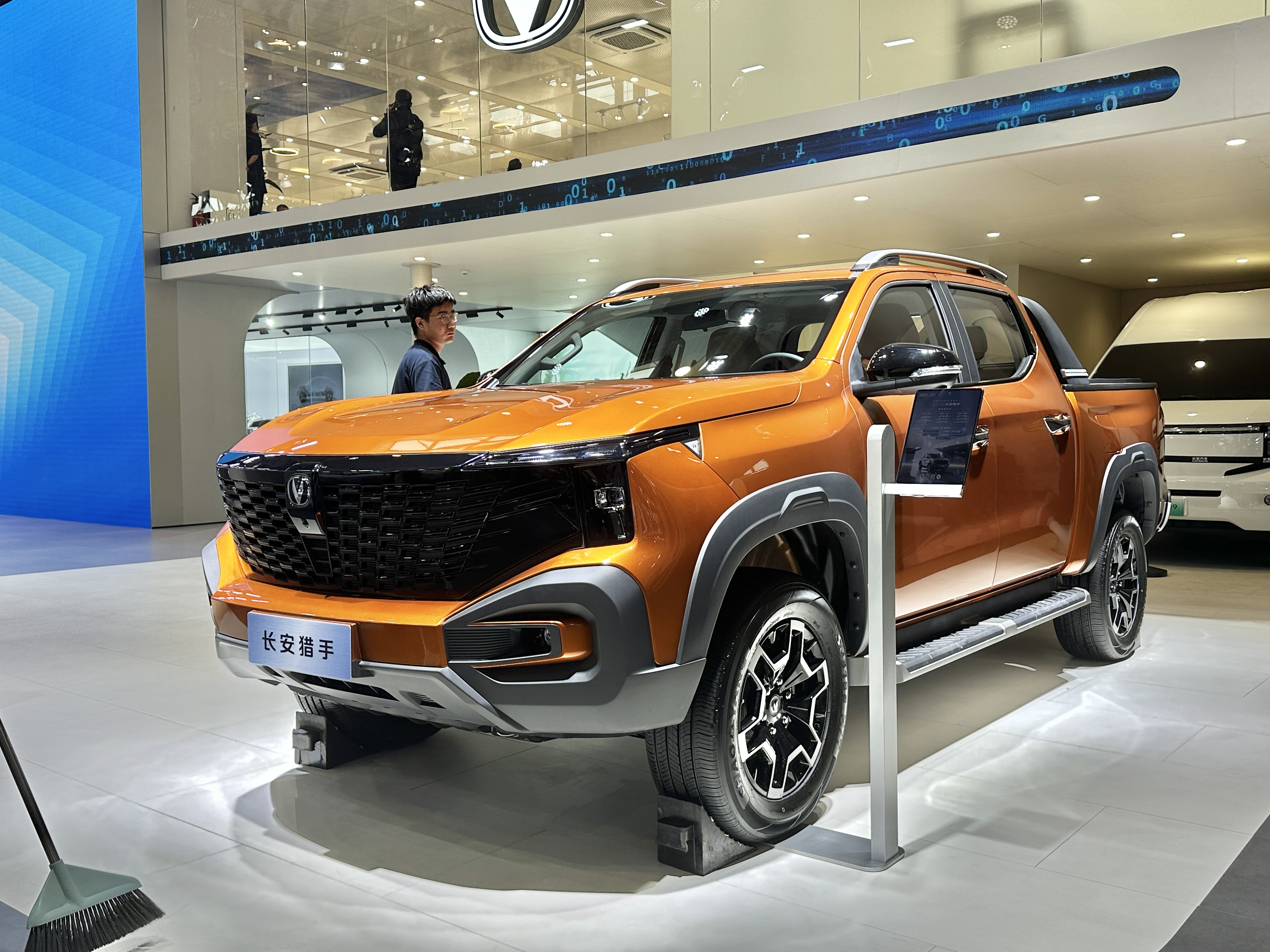
Changan Hunter

=== Changan Nevo ===
Changan Nevo (Chinese: 长安启源; pinyin: Cháng'ān Qǐyuán) is the entry-level EV and extended-range electric line under the Changan brand, launched in 2023. Initial models included the A05 compact sedan, A06 compact sedan, and A07 mid-size sedan. The A06 is a rebadged Changan UNI-V with restyled front and rear ends, while the A05 is a rebadged Changan Yida with similar restyling.

In January 2023, during a Changan product planning conference, it was announced that a new electric-focused sub-brand with the working code OX was in development. Its official name, Nevo, was revealed in April 2023, alongside the first model — a large electric sedan registered with the Chinese patent office as the A07. The brand was publicly launched in summer 2023, and at the September 2023 Chengdu Auto Show the CD701 prototype was previewed ahead of a future launch.

From October 2023 onward, the range was expanded with plug-in hybrid variants based on existing Changan combustion-engine models: the A05 debuted in October, followed by the Q05 SUV and, in November, the A06. In January 2024, the E07 crossover was announced as the first original Nevo-platform EV model after the A07.

In 2025, Changan Nevo continued expanding with fully original designs. The large hybrid SUV Q07 was presented in March, followed in autumn by a second-generation Q05 (battery electric only) and an updated A06 available in both hybrid and pure electric configurations. Changan Nevo also expanded beyond China in 2025, launching in the Philippines with the hybrid pickup Hunter K50 dedicated to the local market. The E07 also entered export markets in 2025, but was marketed in Thailand and Australia under the sister brand Deepal rather than the Changan Nevo name.

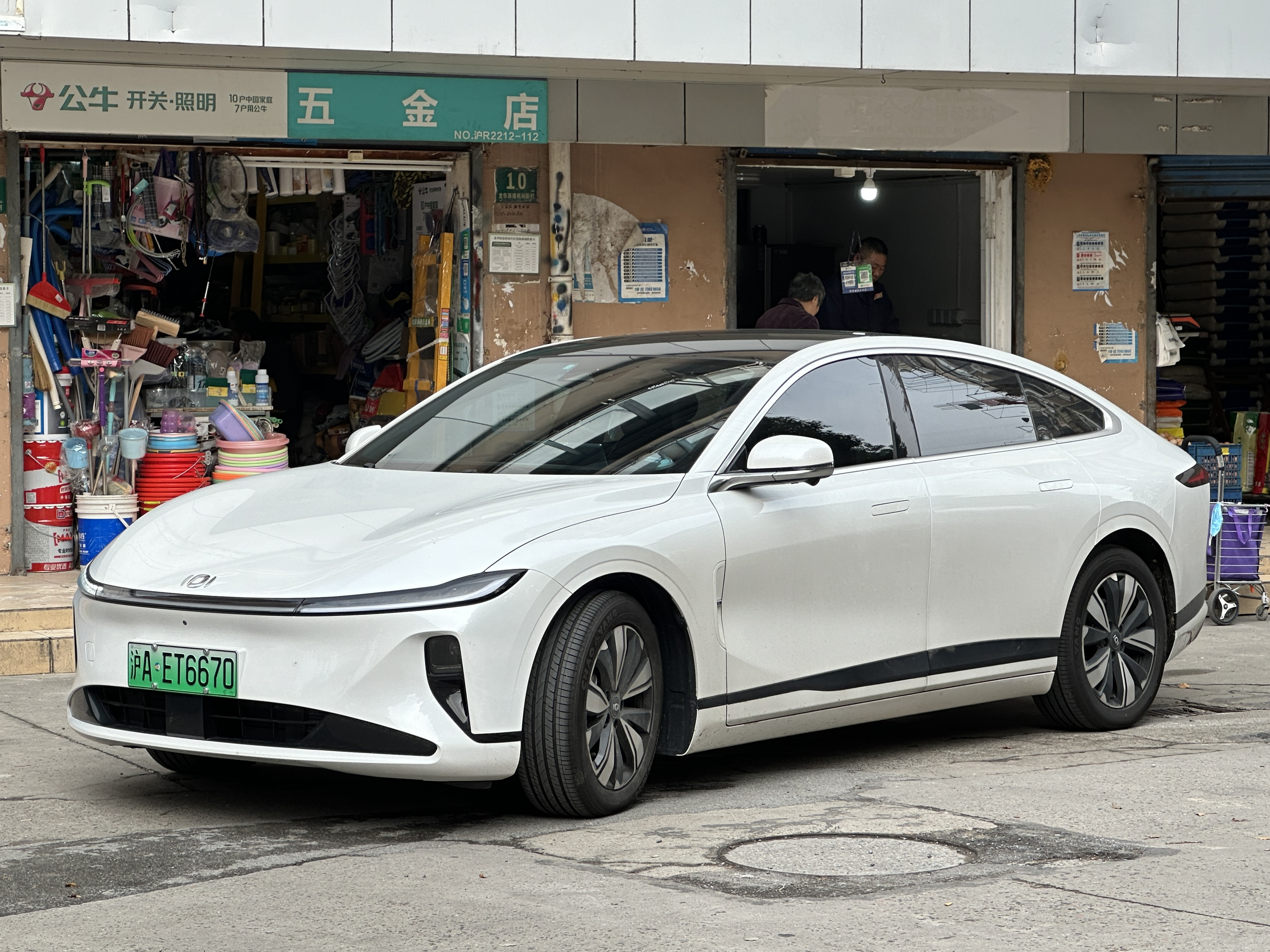
Changan Nevo A07

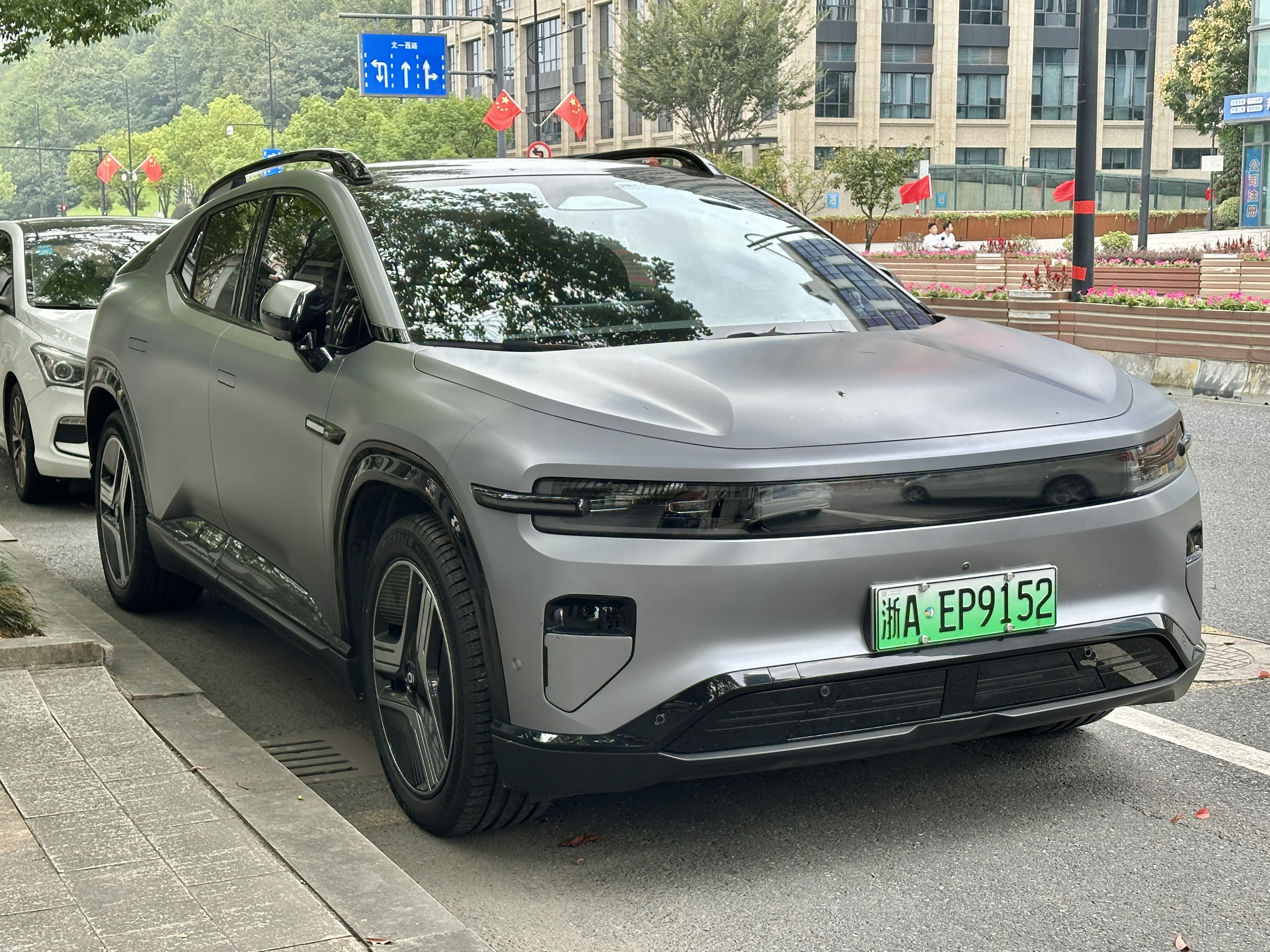
Changan Nevo E07

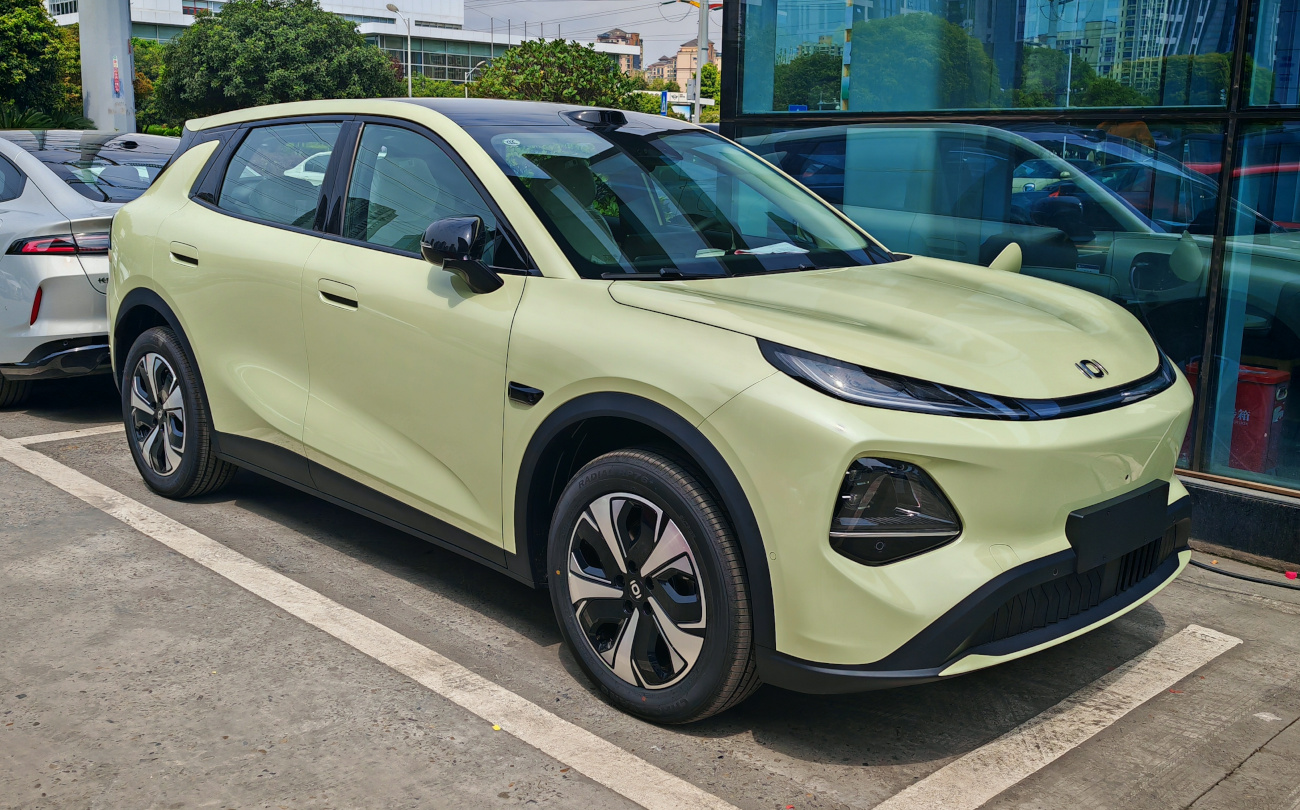
Changan Nevo Q05

=== Deepal ===
Deepal (Chinese: 深蓝; pinyin: Shēnlán) is an electric vehicle brand owned by Changan Automobile. The company was originally founded in 2018 as Chongqing Changan New Energy Automobile Technology and became an independent brand in 2023.

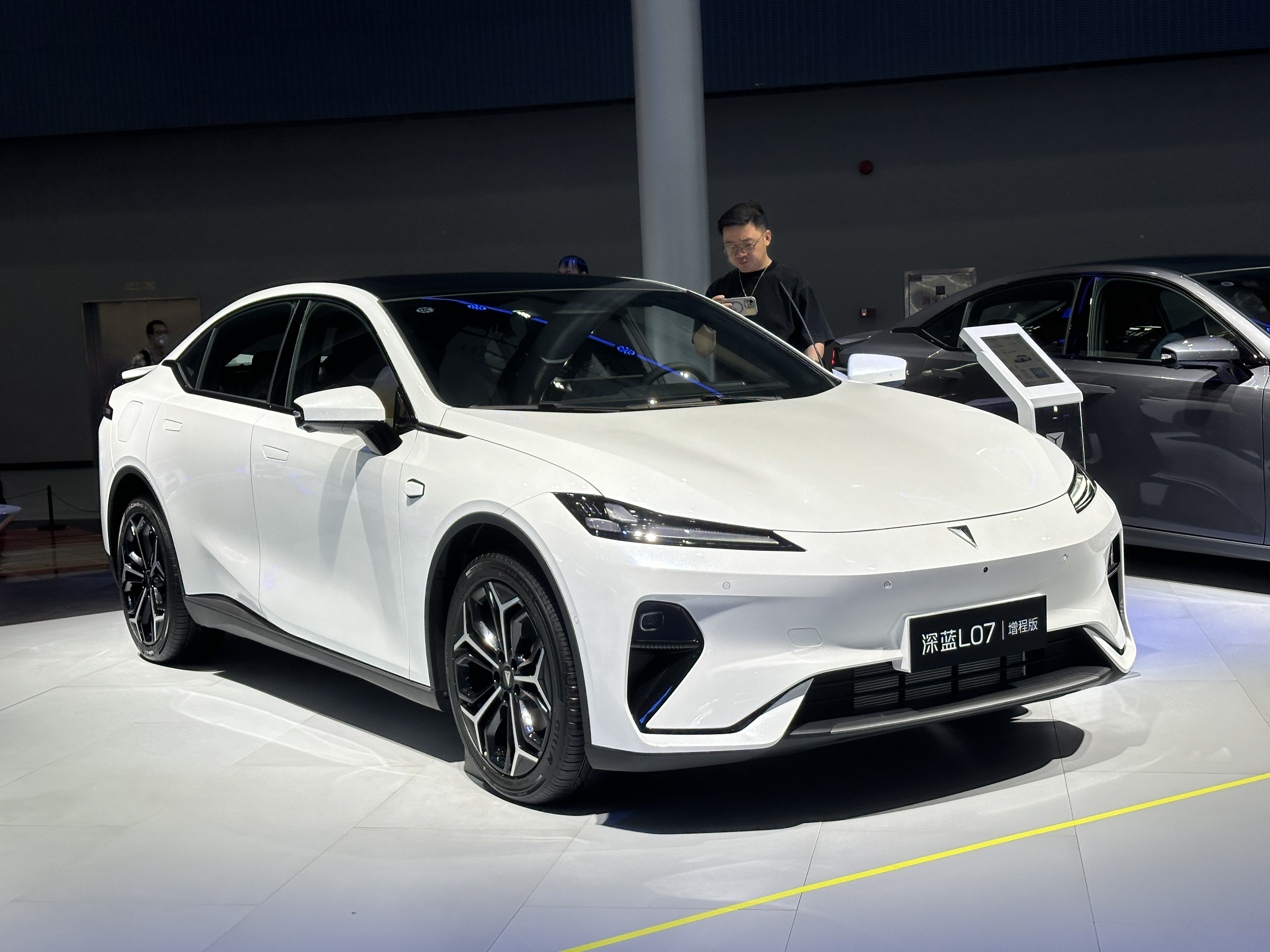
Deepal L07

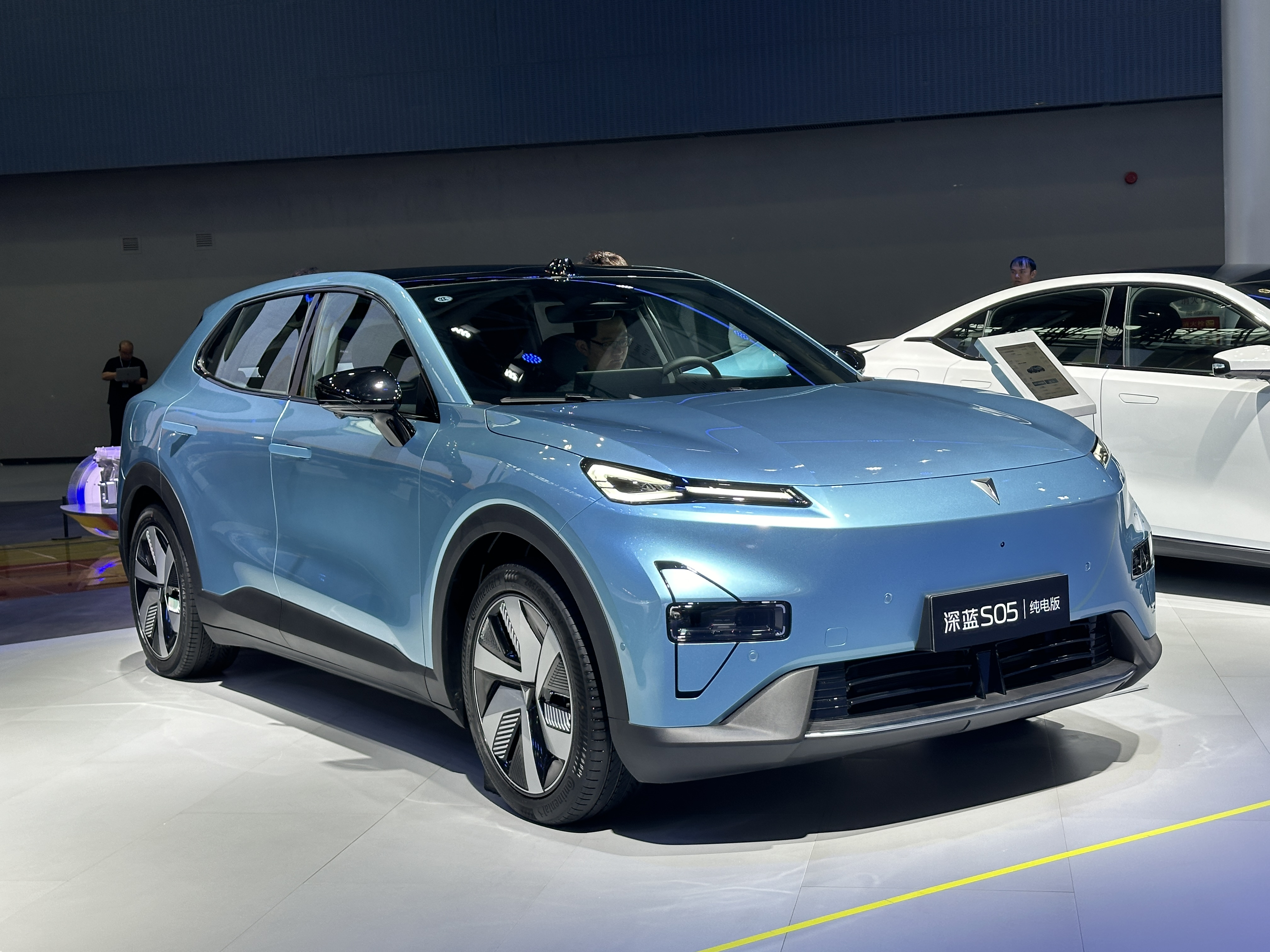
Deepal S05

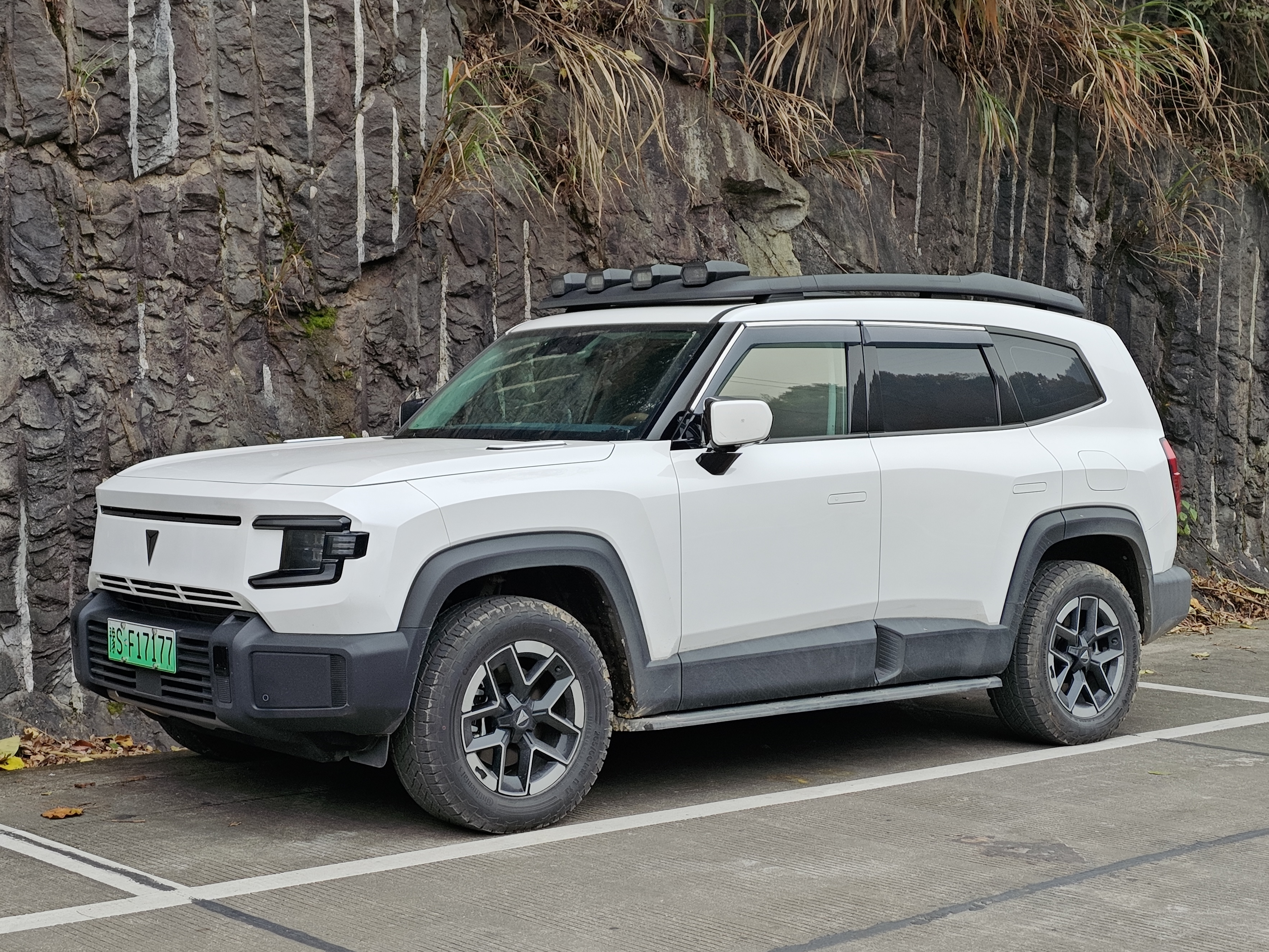
Deepal G318

=== Avatr Technology ===
Avatr Technology is a premium electric vehicle brand jointly established by Changan, battery supplier CATL, and several Chinese institutional investors, with intelligent driving and cockpit technology supplied by Huawei.

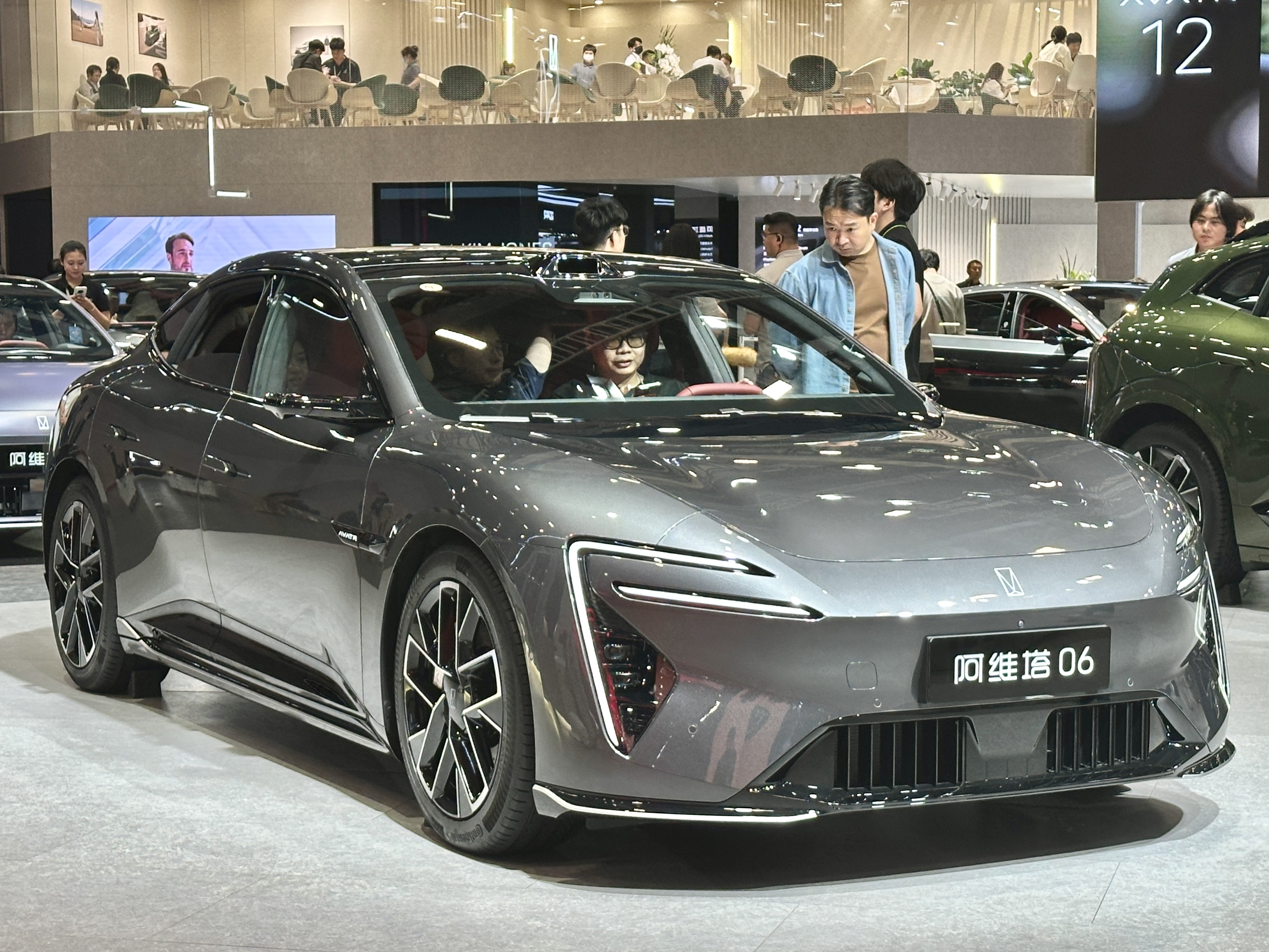
Avatr 06

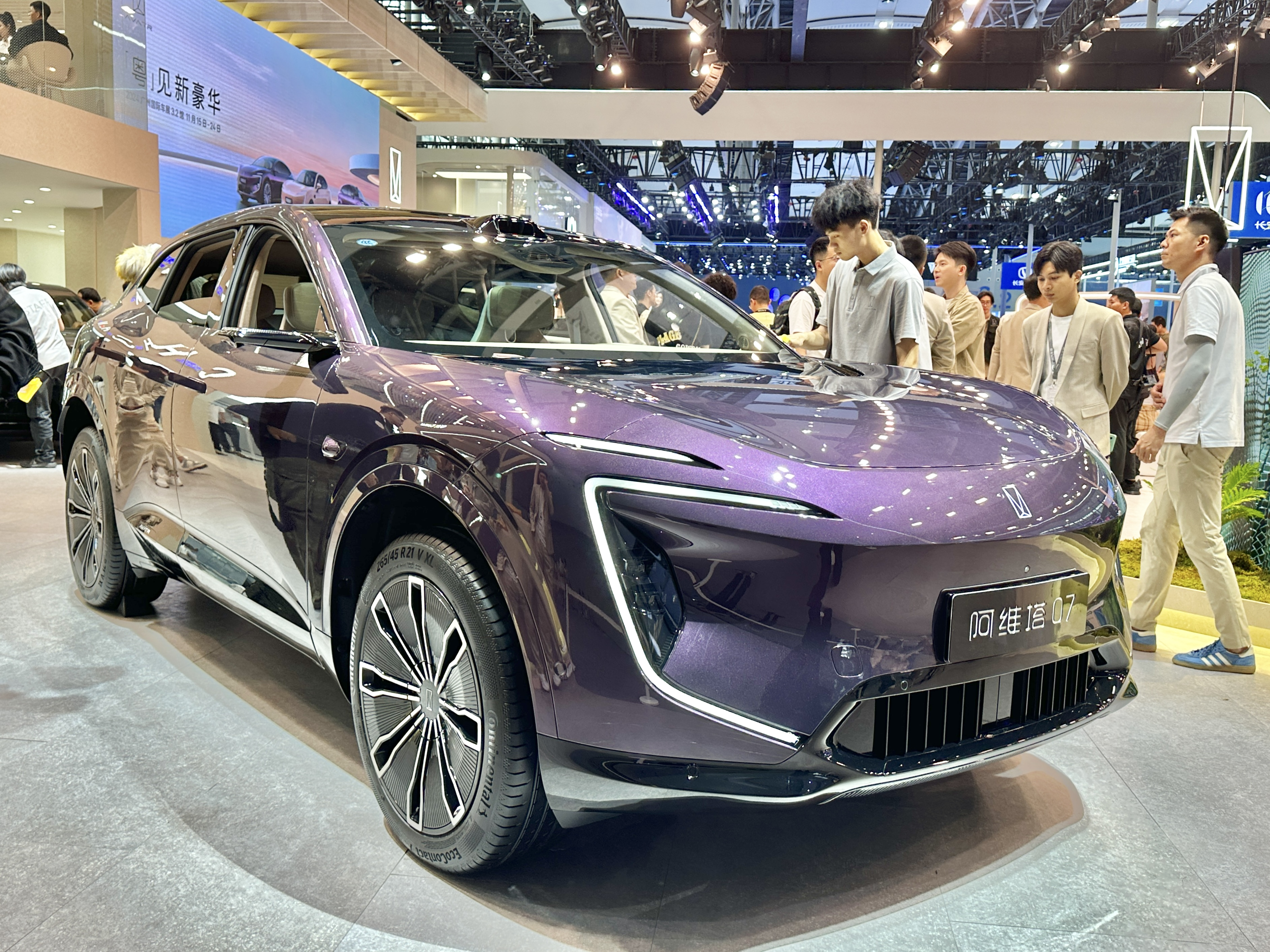
Avatr 07

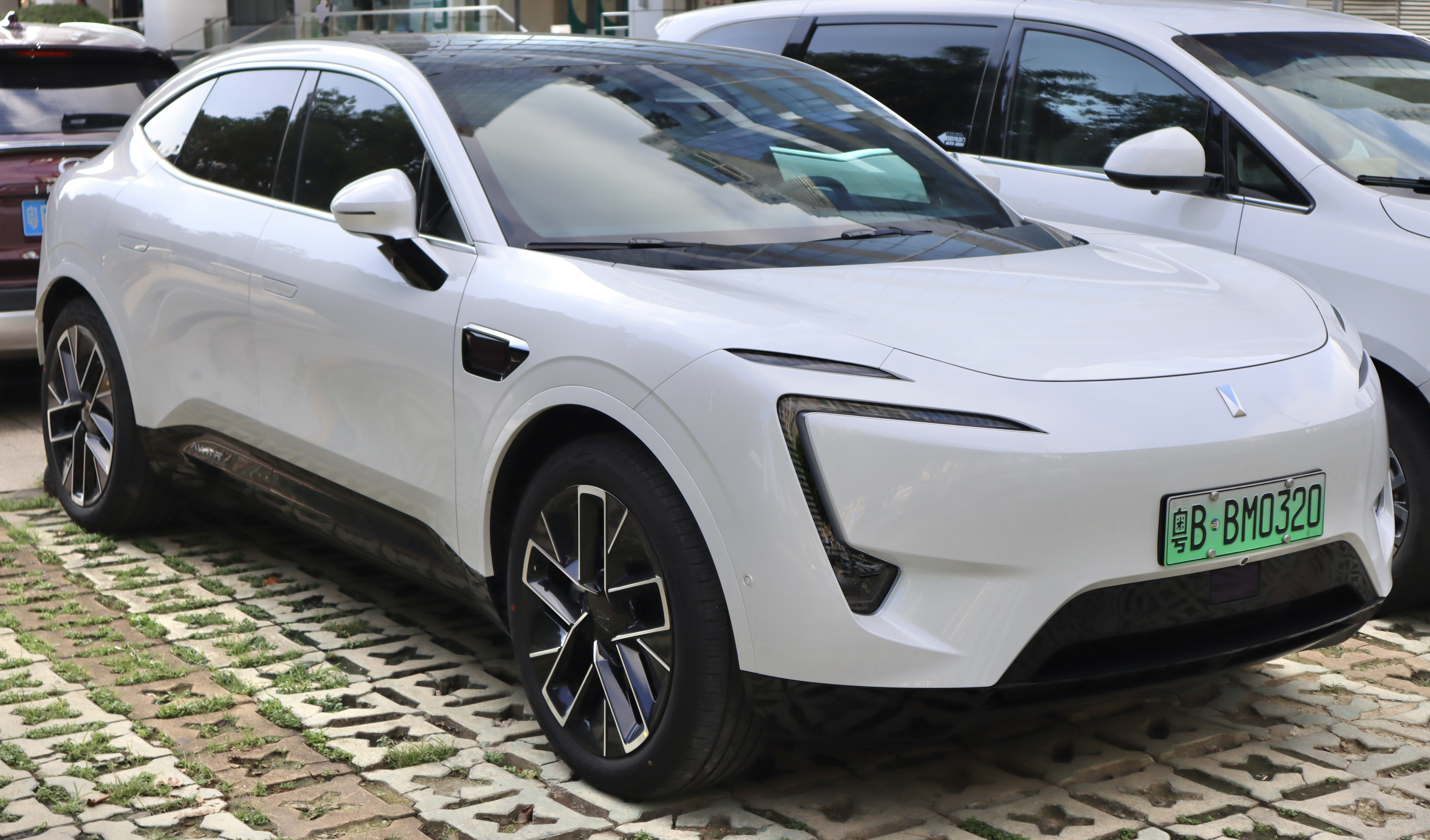
Avatr 11

=== Changan Kaicene ===
Changan Kaicene (Chinese: 长安凯程; pinyin: Cháng'ān Kǎichéng) is the commercial vehicle line under the Changan brand, covering vans, light trucks, and pickups.

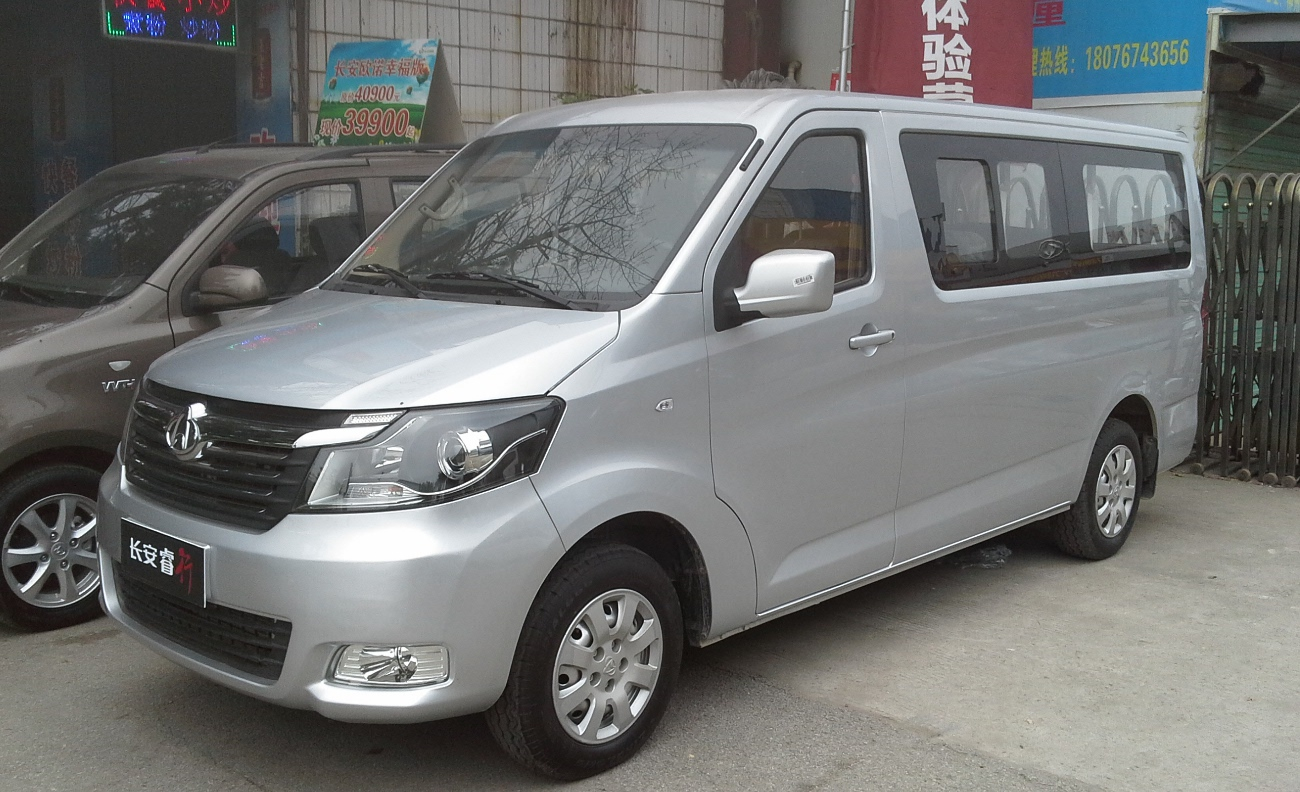
Chana Ruixing M90

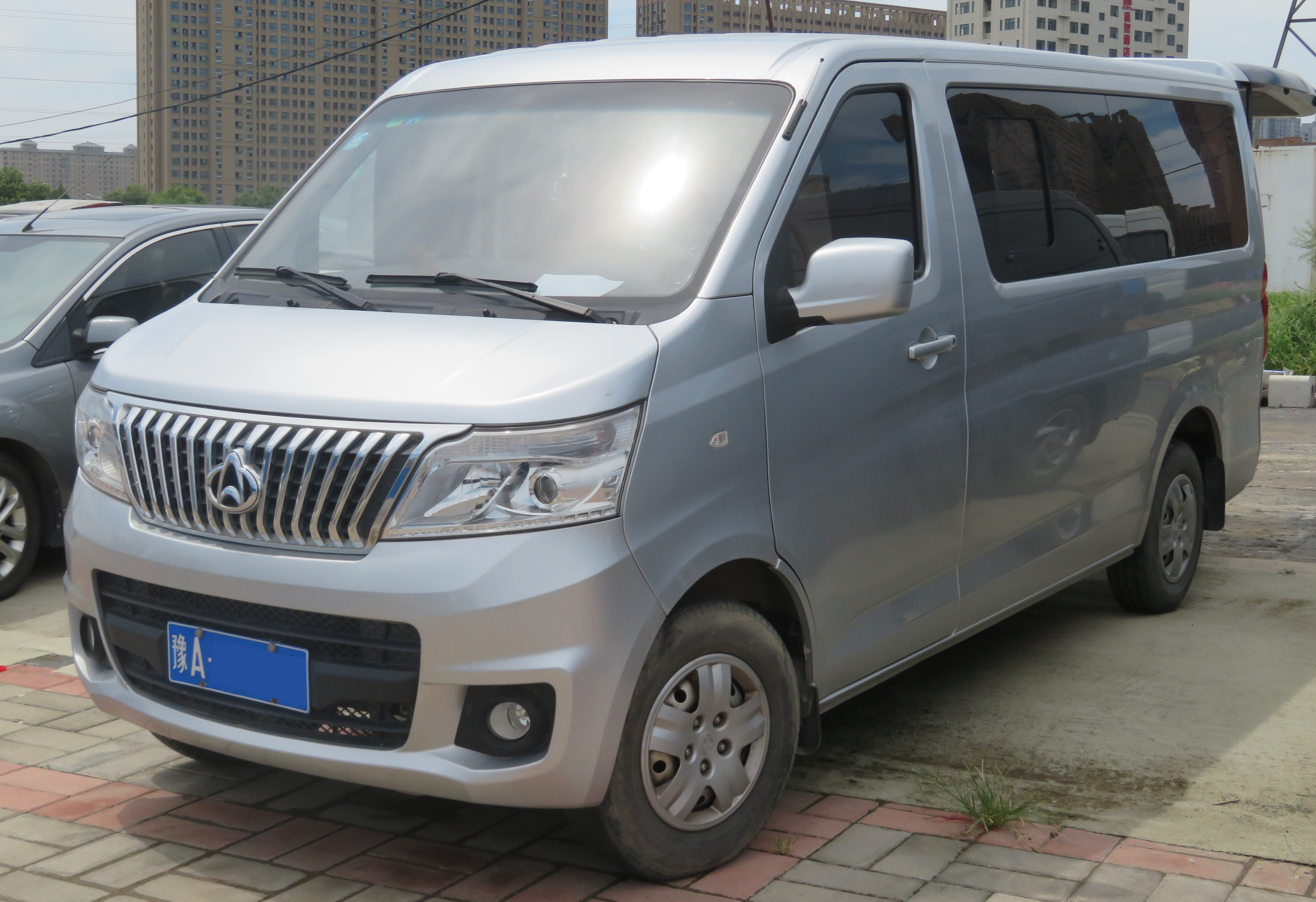
Chana Ruixing M80

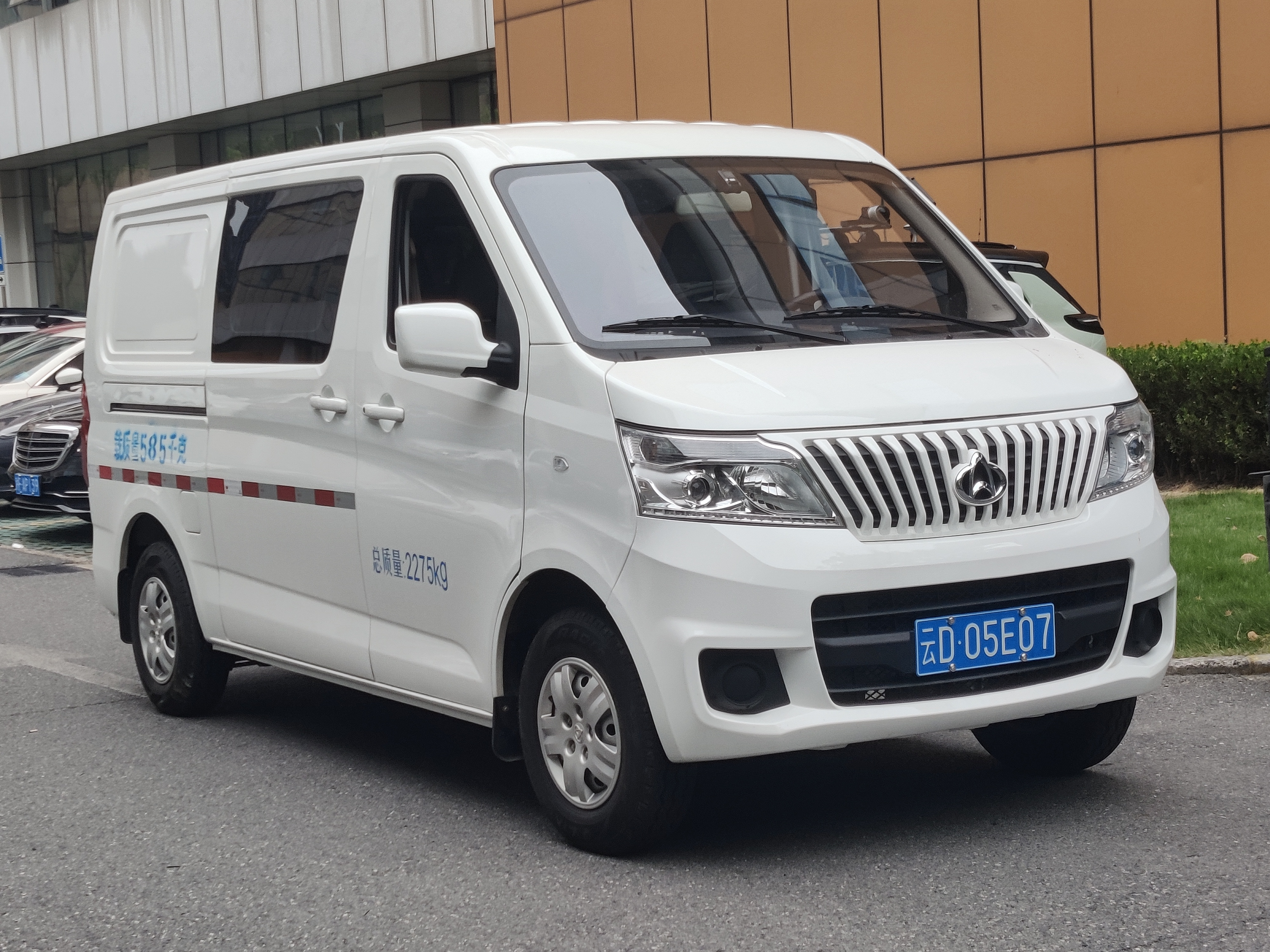
Chana Ruixing M60

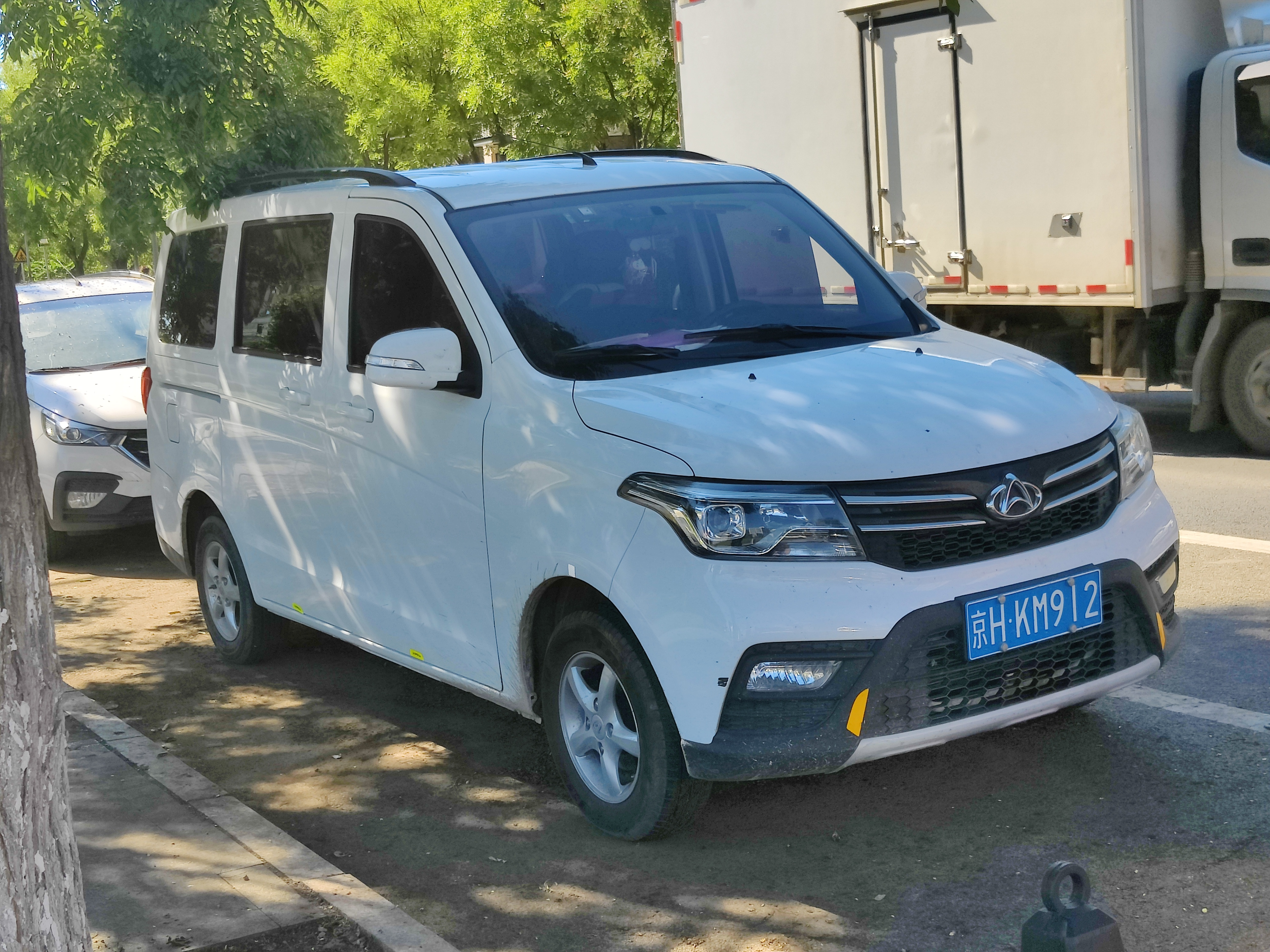
Chana Honor

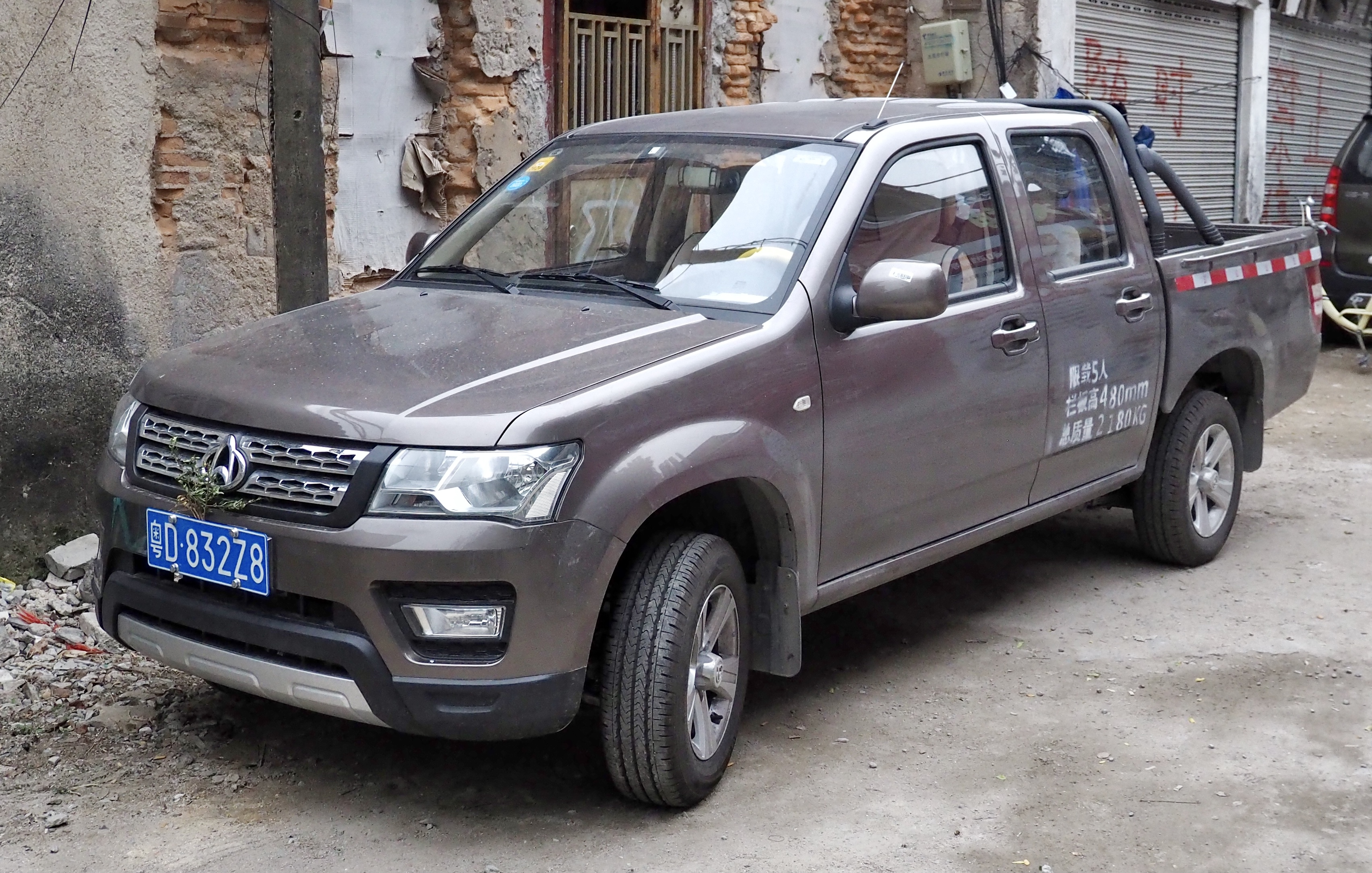
Kaicene F30

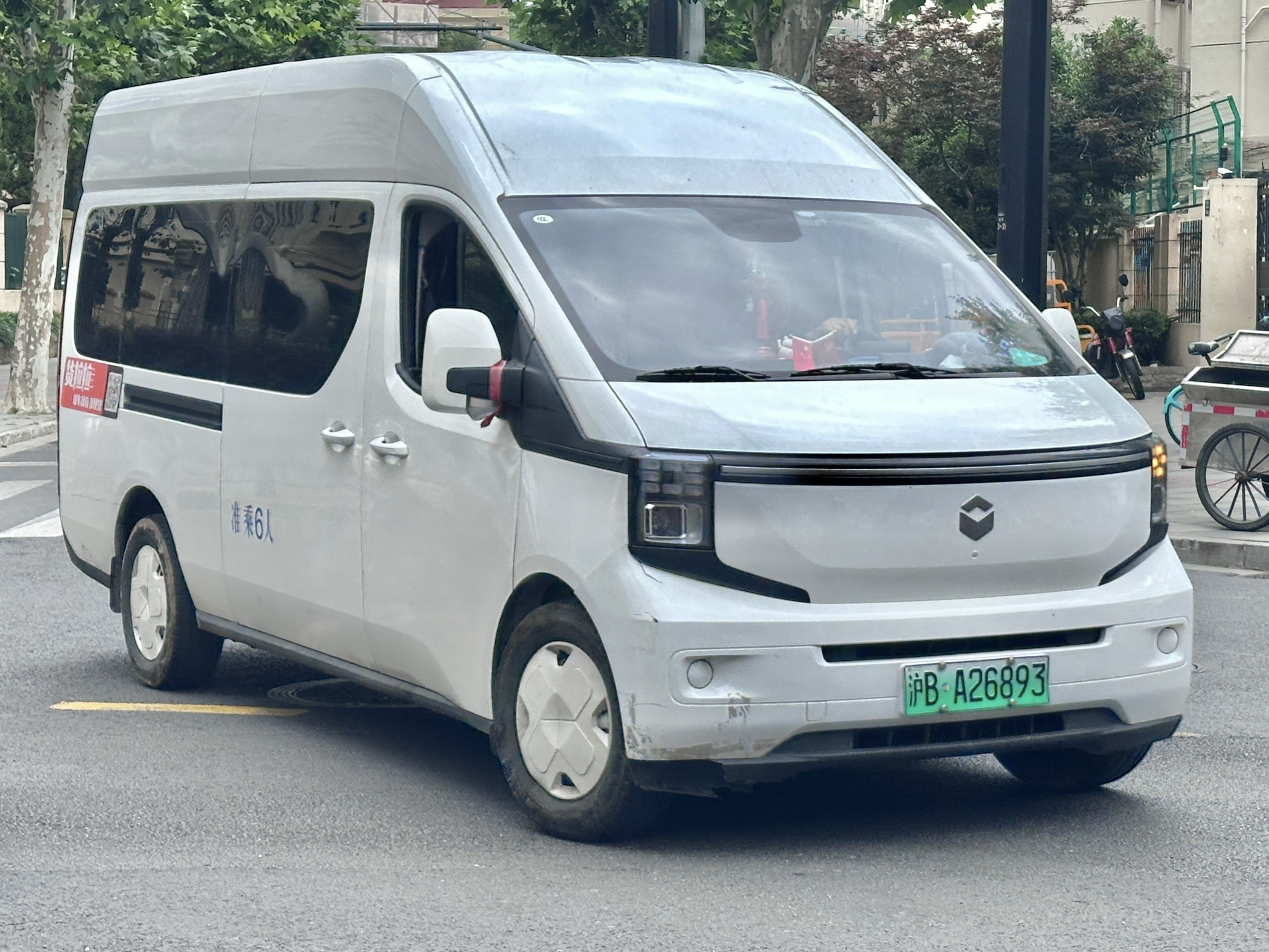
Kaicene V919

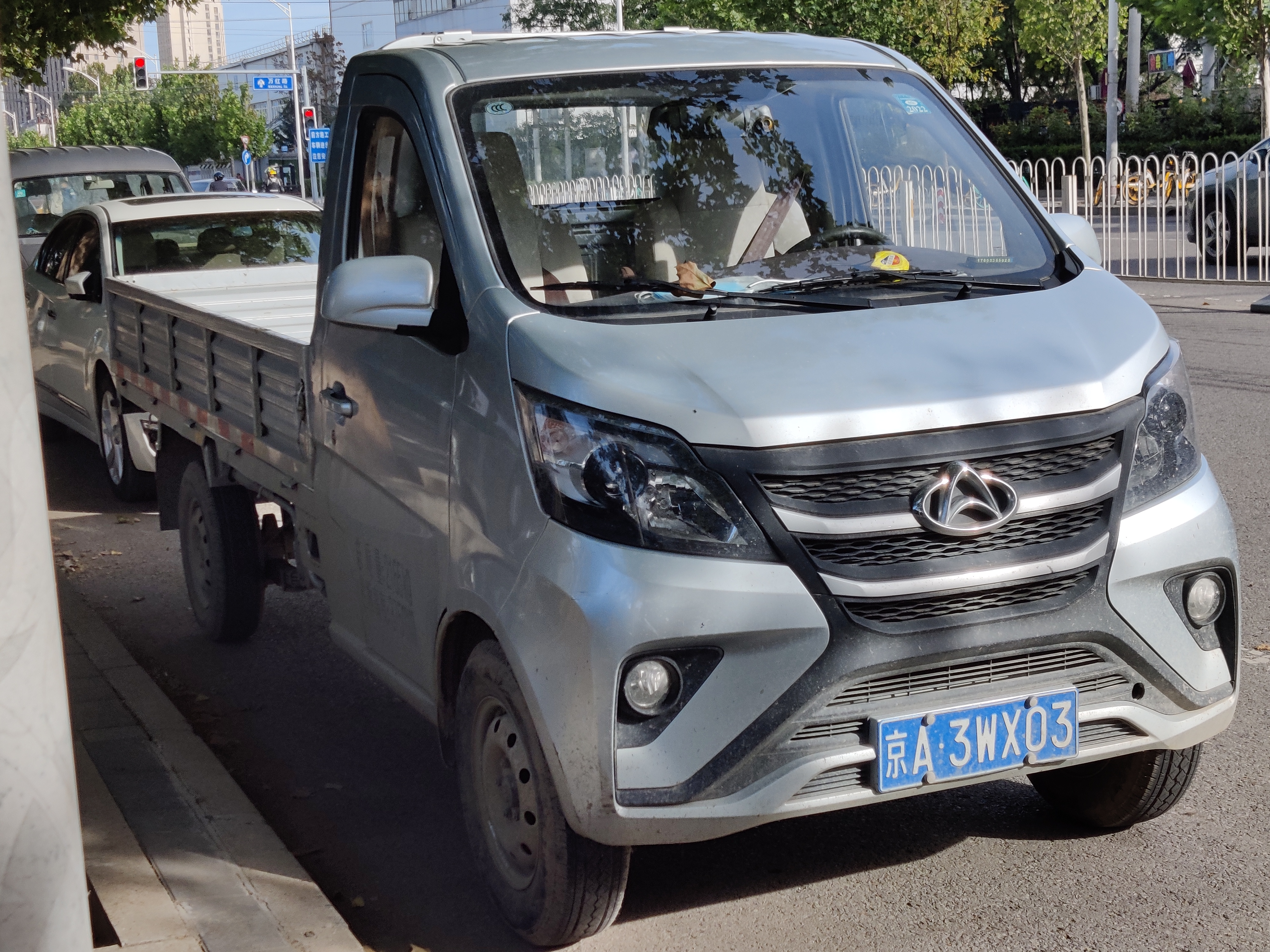
Kaicene Star Truck

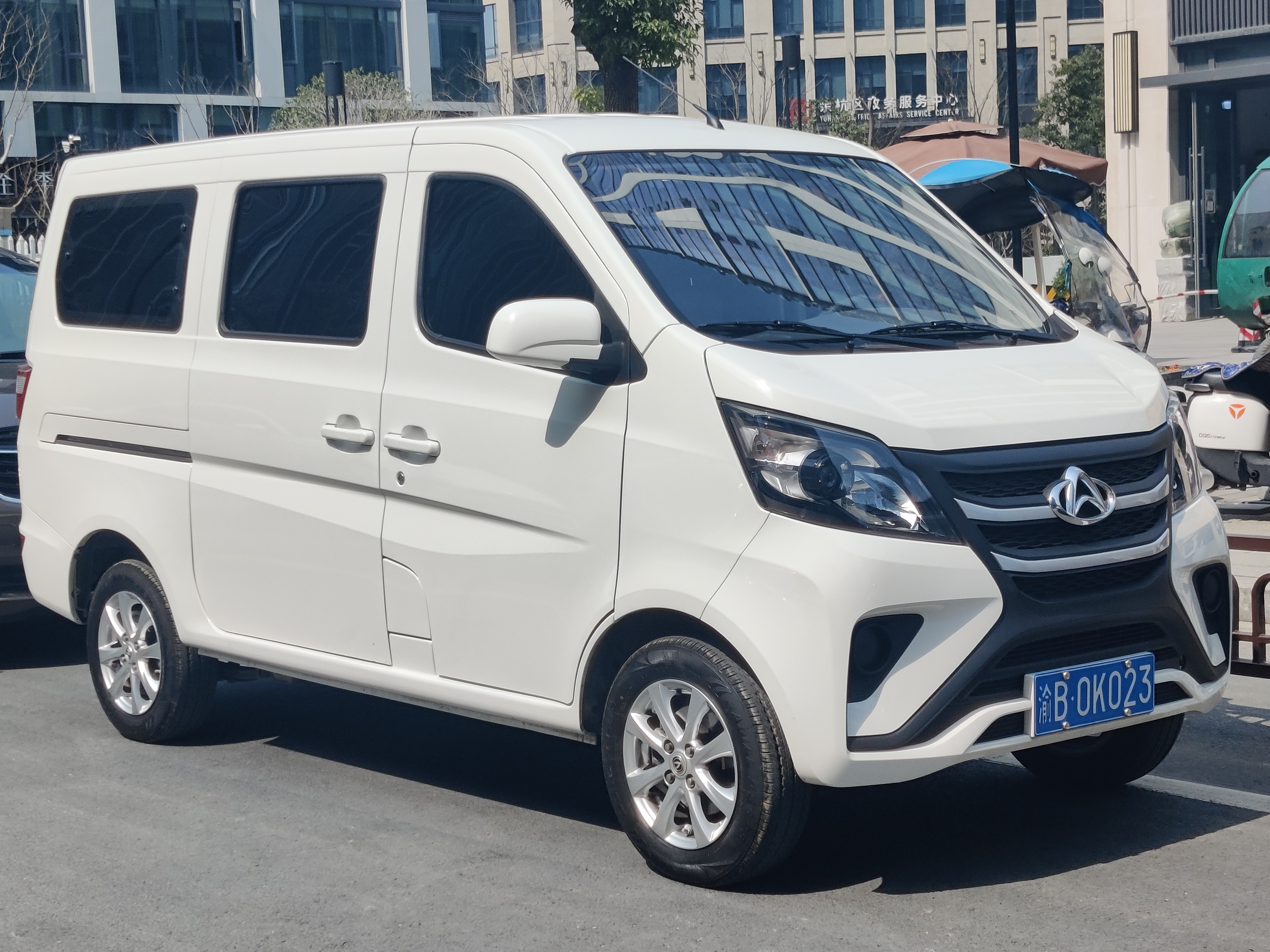
Chana Star 5

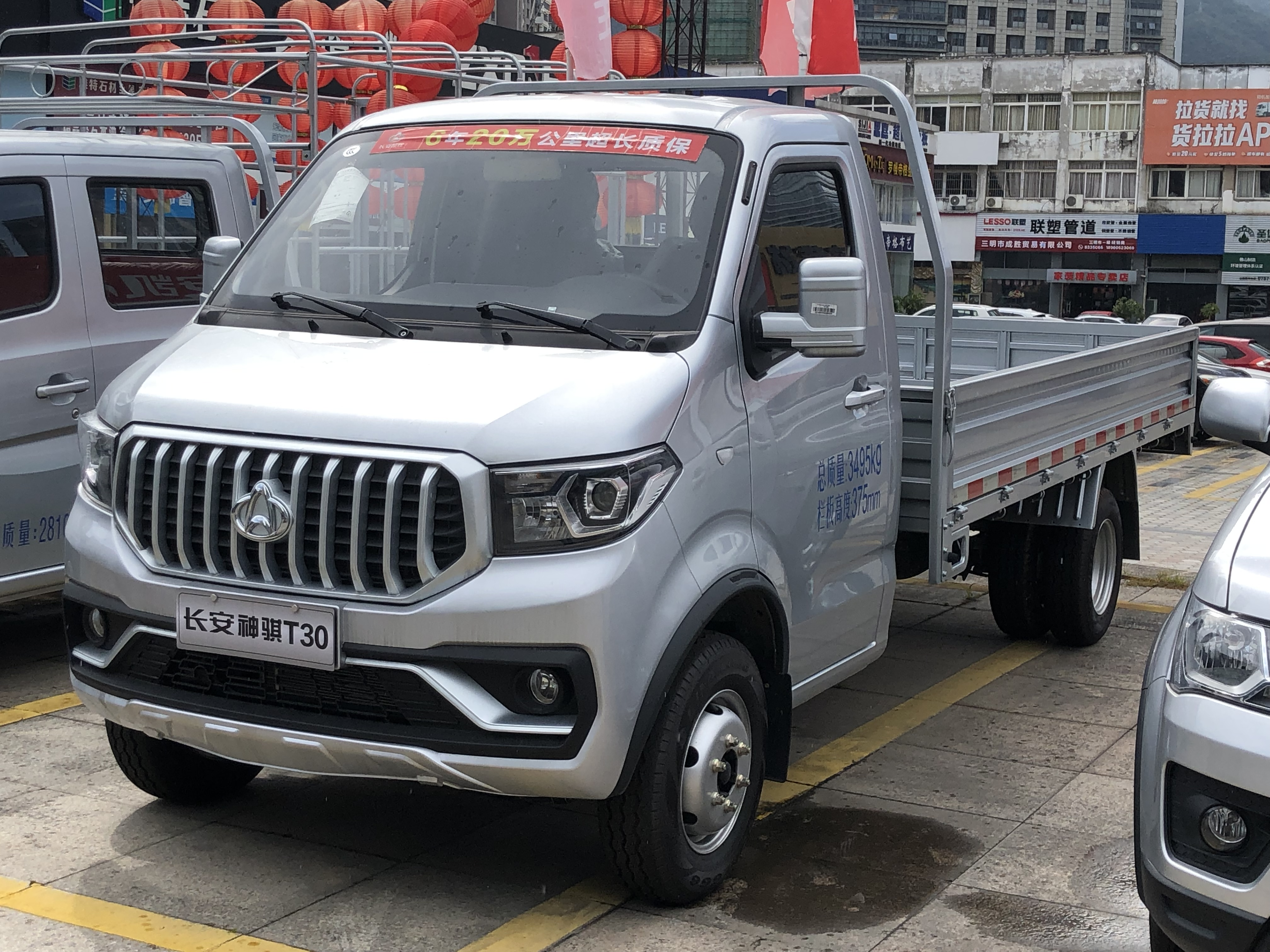
Kaicene Shenqi T30

== Sales ==
Changan group sales (foreign joint-venture brands excluded)
Year	Total (Note: Including passenger and commercial vehicles)	Changan (Note: Changan brand passenger vehicles only from 2019)	Changan Nevo	Changan Kaicene	Deepal	Avatr	Oshan	JMH (Landwind)
2010	1,239,990	1,047,983	–	–	–	–	–	192,007
2011	1,025,233	816,627	–	–	–	–	–	208,606
2012	1,053,645	841,137	–	–	–	–	–	212,508
2013	1,152,537	901,270	–	–	–	–	–	251,267
2014	1,363,487	1,055,630	–	–	–	–	–	307,857
2015	1,504,936	1,199,053	–	–	–	–	–	305,883
2016	1,682,741	1,304,612	–	–	–	–	–	378,129
2017	1,597,543	1,215,406	–	–	–	–	–	382,137
2018	1,270,100	729,067	–	–	–	–	192,745	348,288
2019	1,331,802	849,552	–	–	–	–	153,258	divested
2020	1,503,604	978,398	–	–	–	–	113,820	divested
2021	1,754,707	1,009,822	–	–	–	–	194,381	divested
2022	1,874,569	1,125,048	–	–	33,354	757	222,030	divested
2023	2,097,794	1,432,543	–	–	136,912	27,589	discontinued	divested
2024	2,226,489	1,350,784			243,894	73,606	discontinued	divested
2025	2,468,197	1,344,080	410,000	261,000	333,117	120,000	discontinued	divested

== Joint ventures ==
Like most major Chinese automakers, Changan partners with Western and Japanese manufacturers to produce and sell their vehicles in China, and with domestic partners to share capacity and development costs.

=== Changan Ford (2001–present) ===
Changan Ford was formed in 2001 and initially assembled Ford-branded passenger vehicles from complete knock-down kits. It produces Chinese-market versions of Ford consumer models, with a dealer network that includes outlets in second- and third-tier Chinese cities.

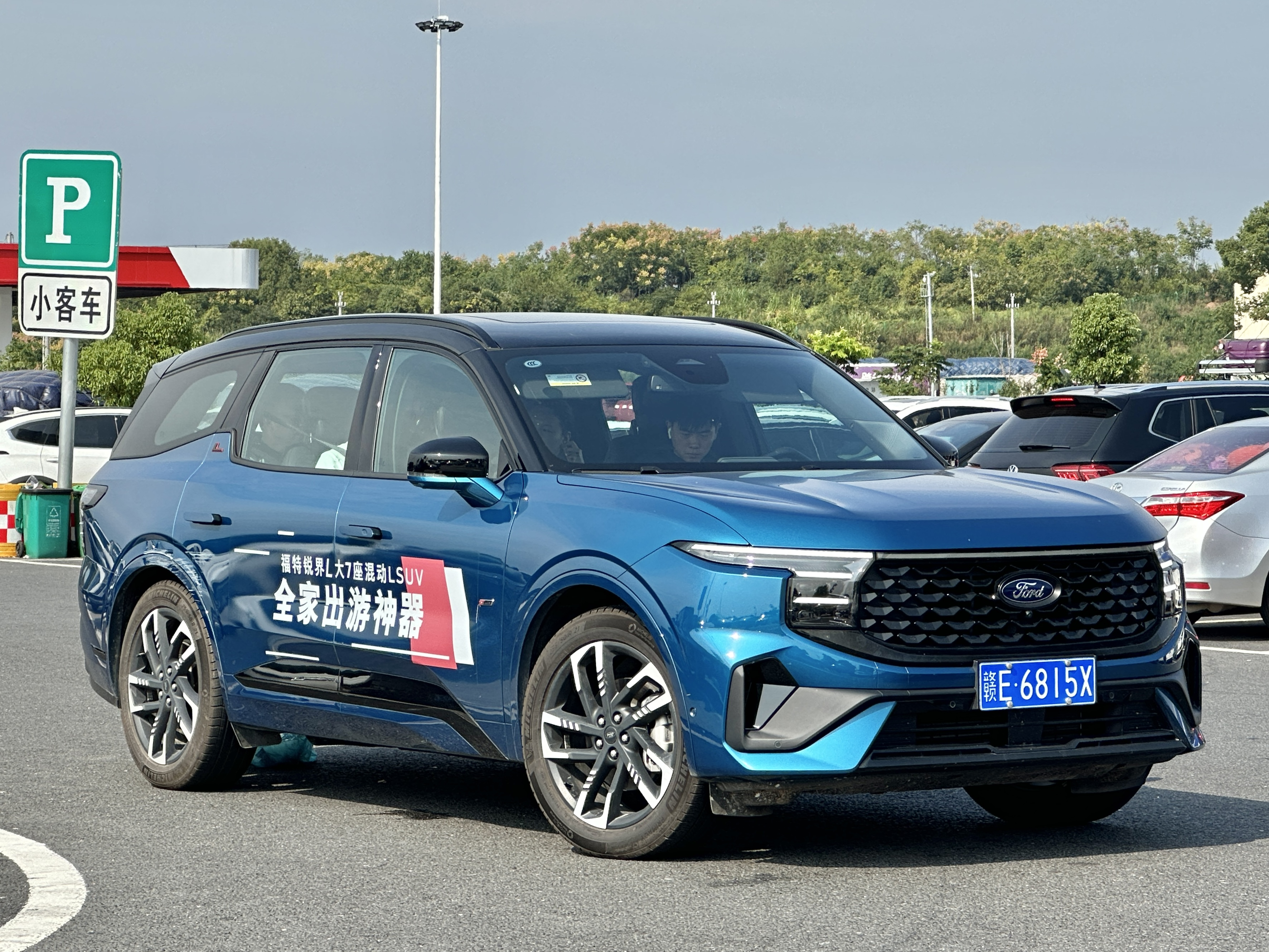
Ford Edge L

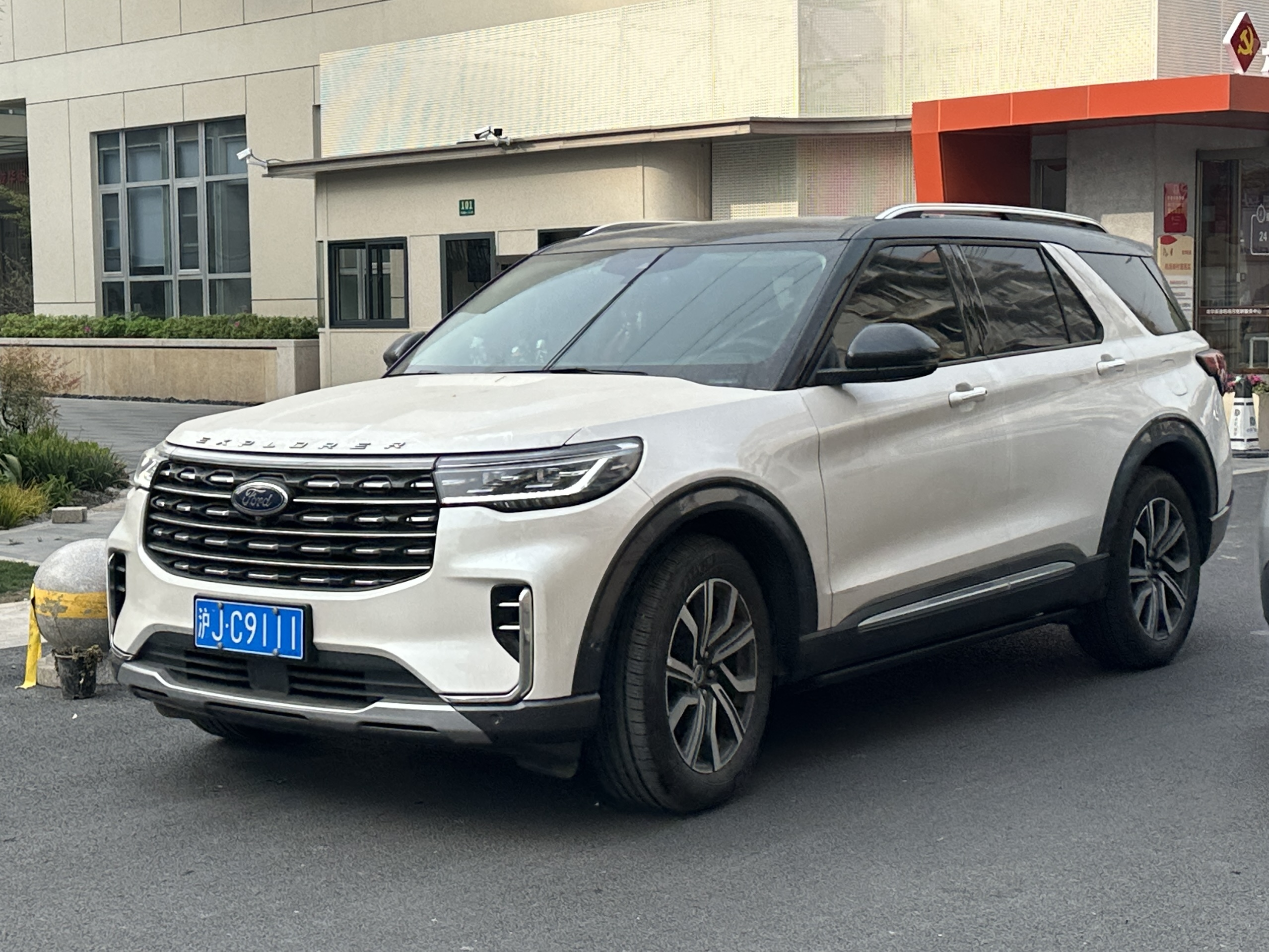
Ford Explorer

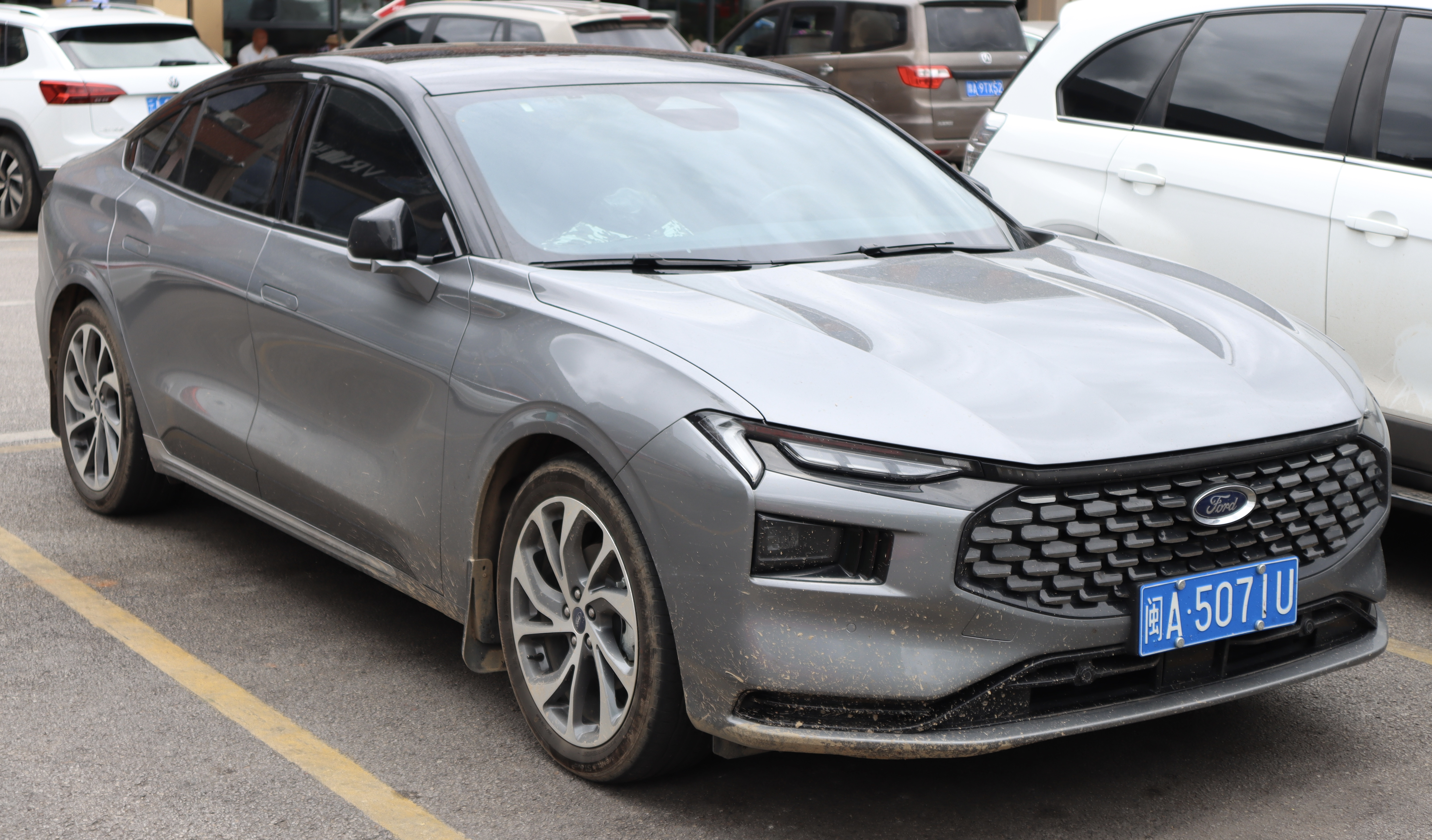
Ford Mondeo

=== Changan Mazda (2012–present) ===
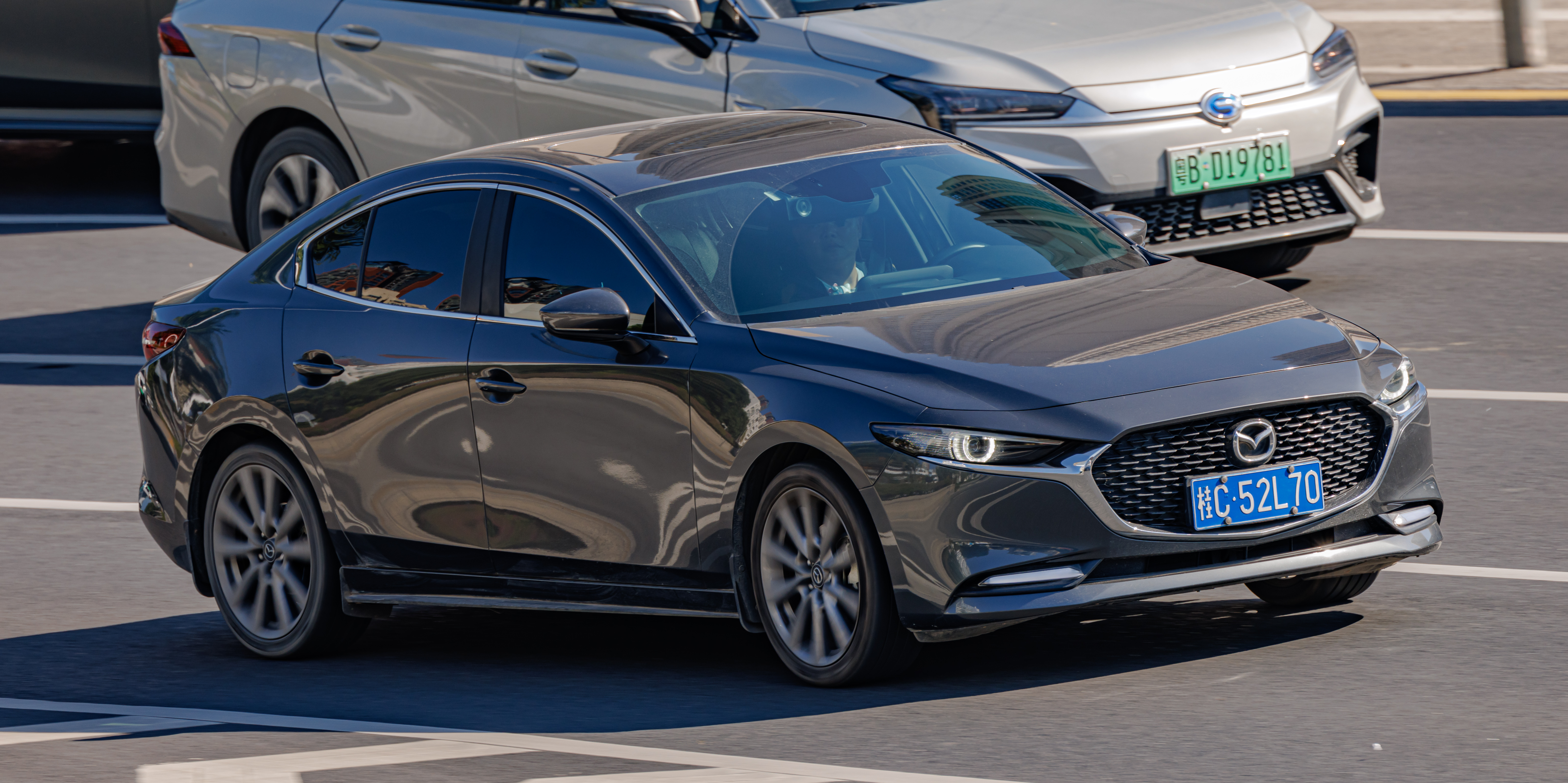
Mazda 3 Axela sedan

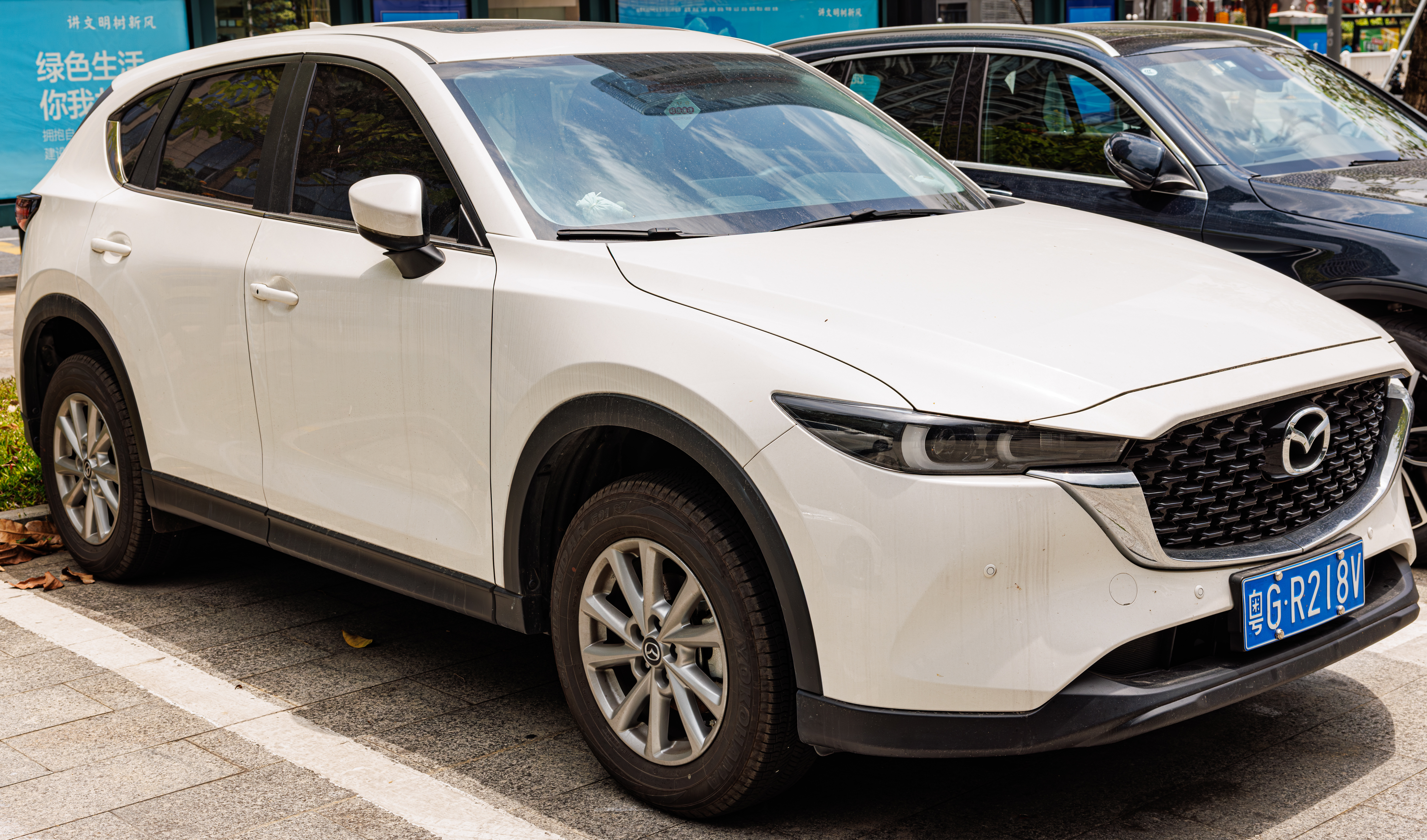
Mazda CX-5

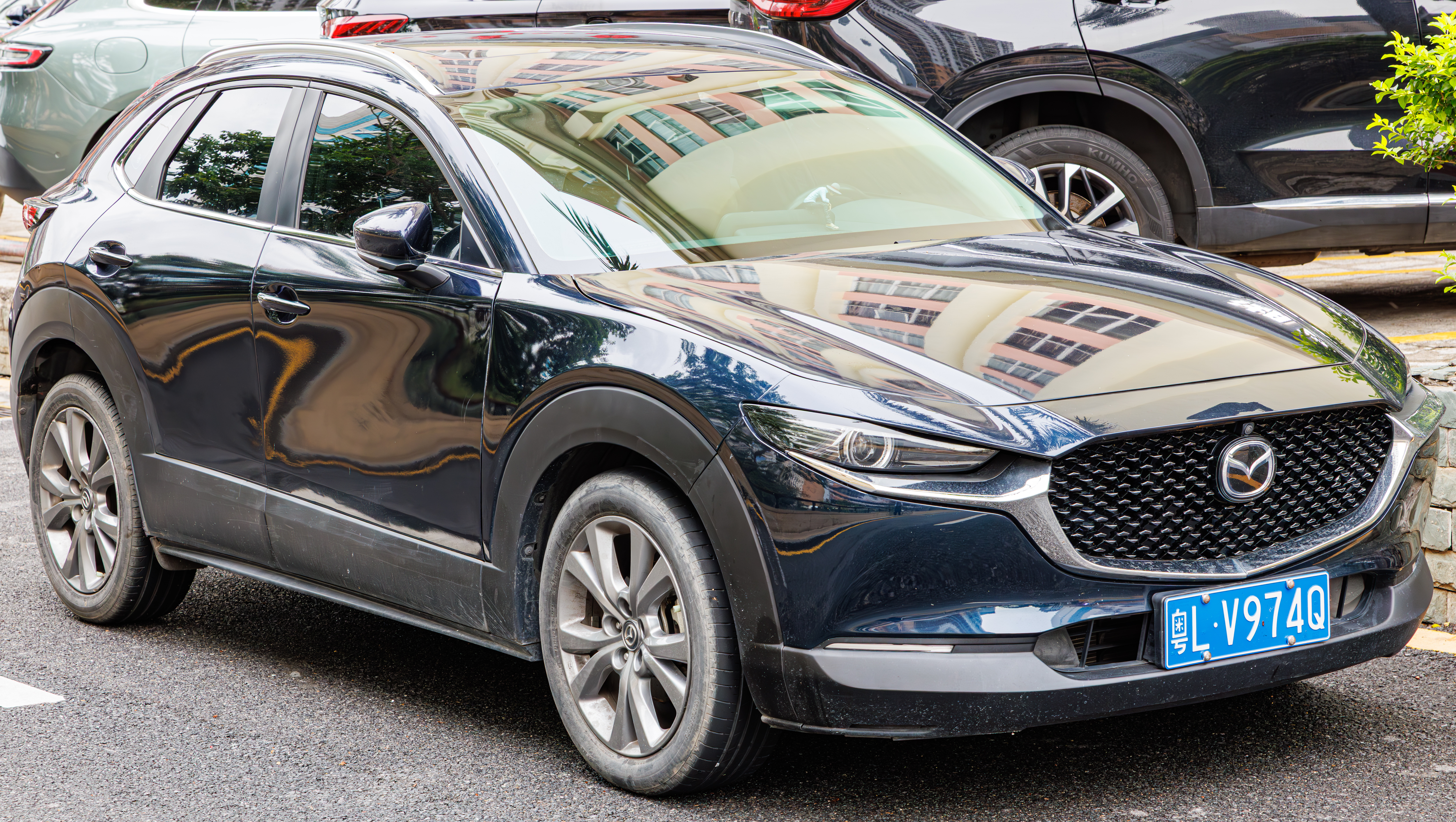
Mazda CX-30

=== Changan Kuayue ===
Chongqing Kuayue Automobile is a cooperative venture between Changan and Chongqing Kuayue Group specialising in commercial vehicle production. The group builds commercial vehicles primarily under the Kuayue and Kaicene brands.

==== History ====
In 2012, the company began gradually moving away from outdated designs based on 20th-century Suzuki technology, modernizing its lineup with its own designs. In 2017, Kuayue expanded its lineup to include its first electric vehicles derived from internal combustion models.

==== Car models ====
===== Currently in production =====
====== Commercial vehicles ======
- V3
- V5
- Xinbao T1
- Xinbao T3
- Xinbao T5
- Kuayuezhe D5
- Kuayuewang X1
- Kuayuewang X3
- Kuayuewang X5
- Kuayuewang X7
- Kuayuexing V3
- Kuayuexing V5
- Kuayuexing V7

====== Electric cars ======
- Xinbao T3 EV
- Kuayuewang X1 EV
- Kuayuewang X3 EV
- Kuayuezhe D5 EV
- Kuayuexing V5 EV
- Kuayuexing V7 EV

====== Pickups ======
- Wang F3

====== Former models ======
- Kuayue Xunlong (1999–2015)
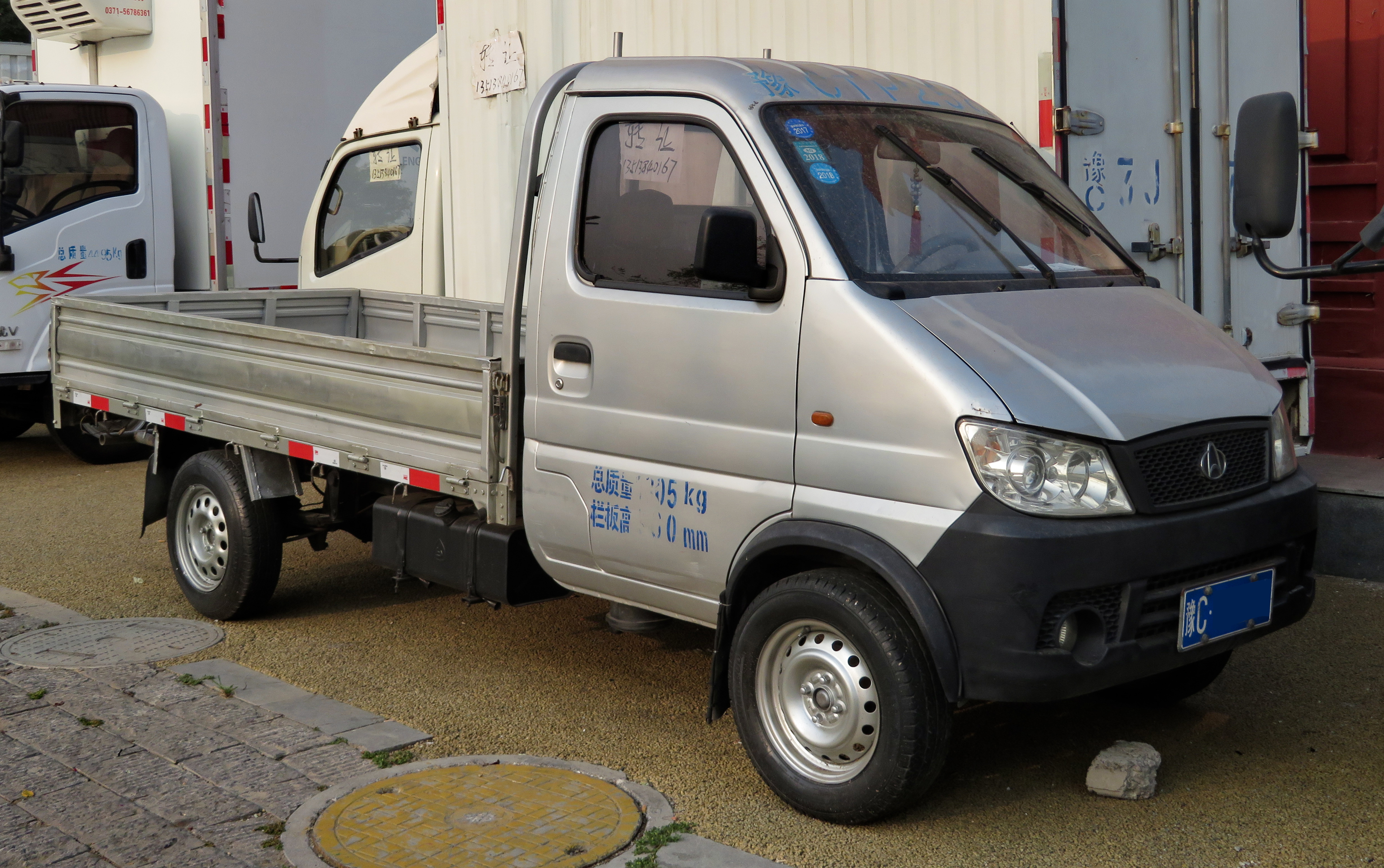
Kuayue Xinbao Mini

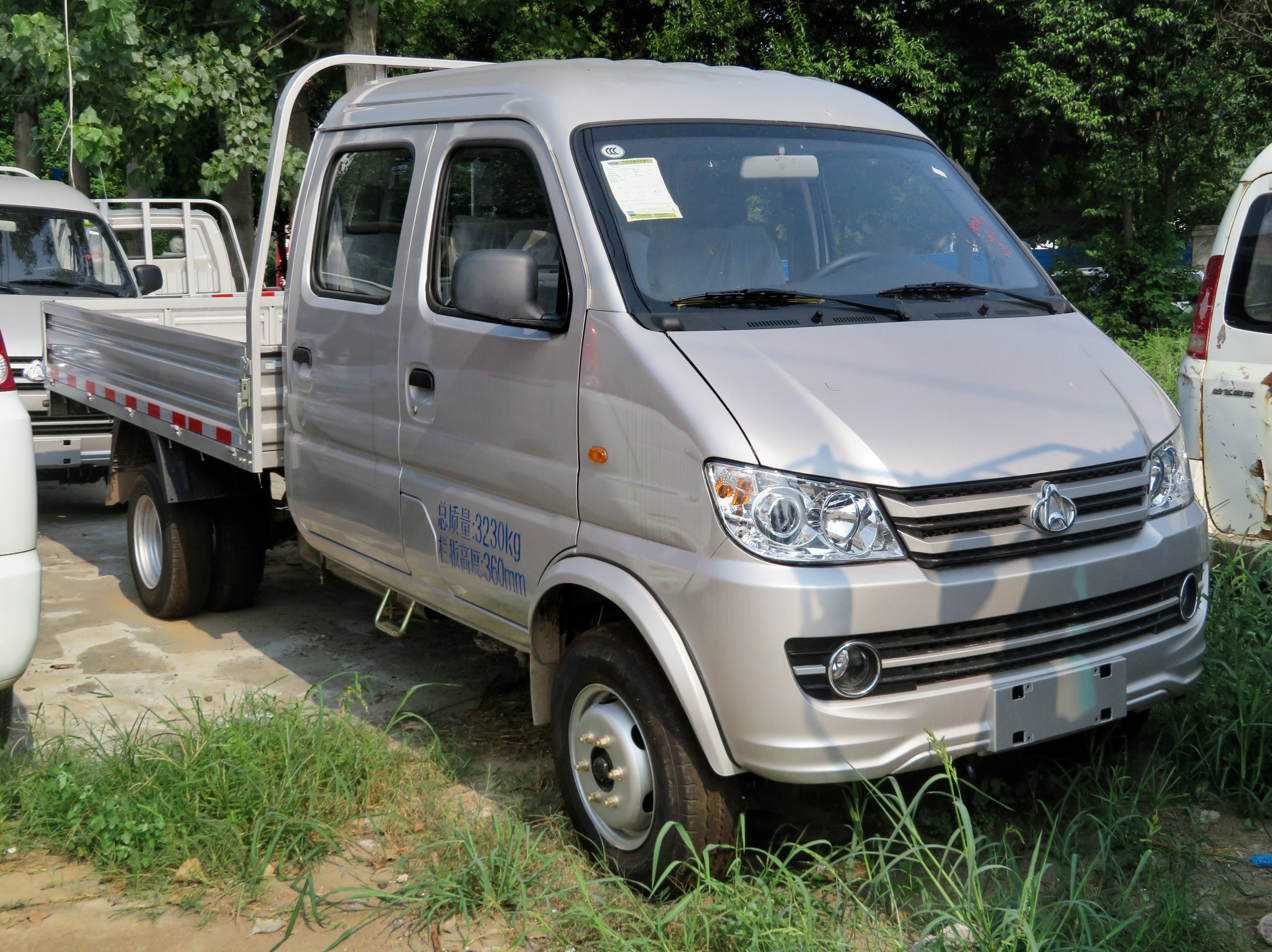
Kuayue Xinbao

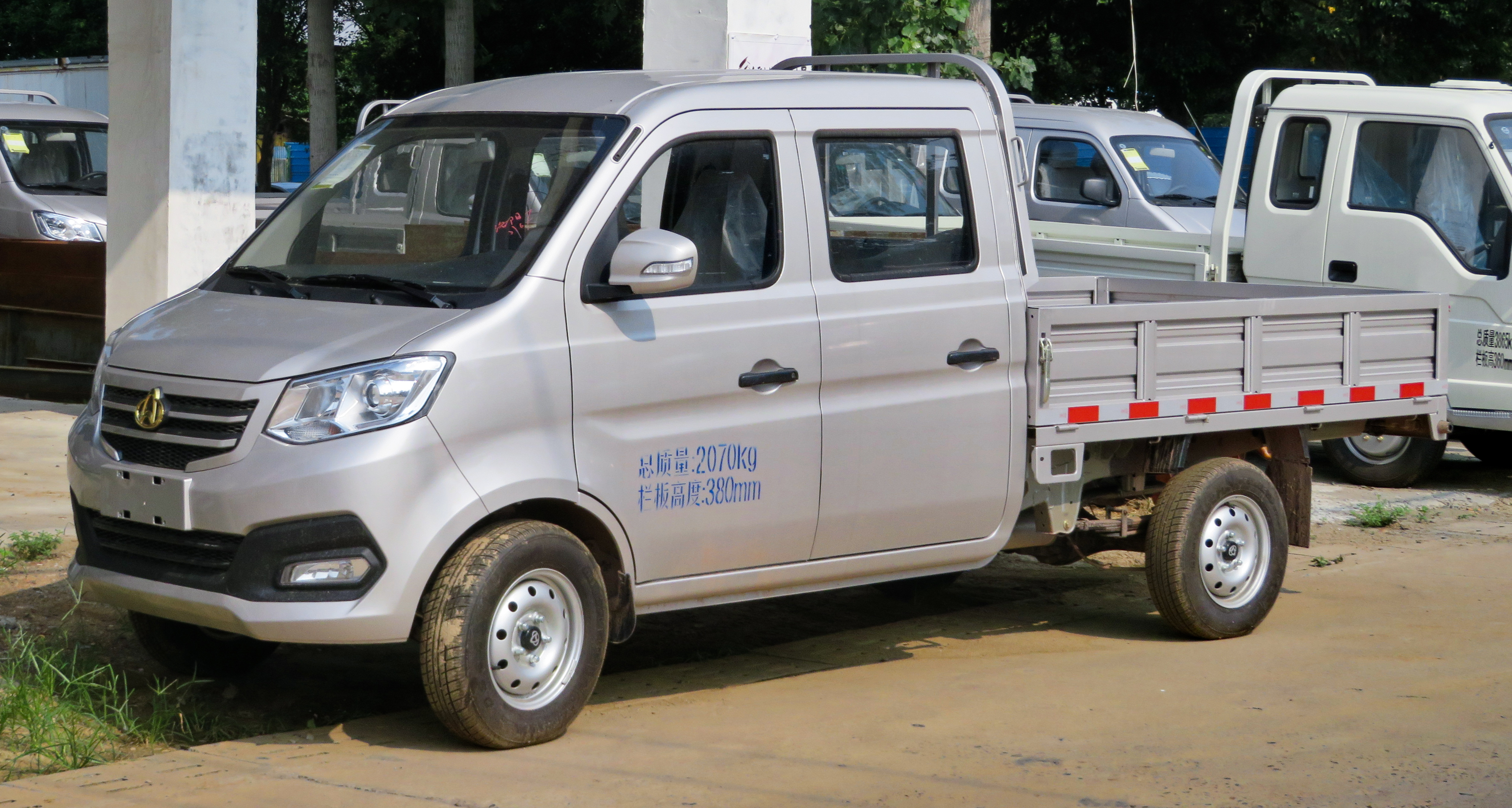
Kuayue Xinbao T3

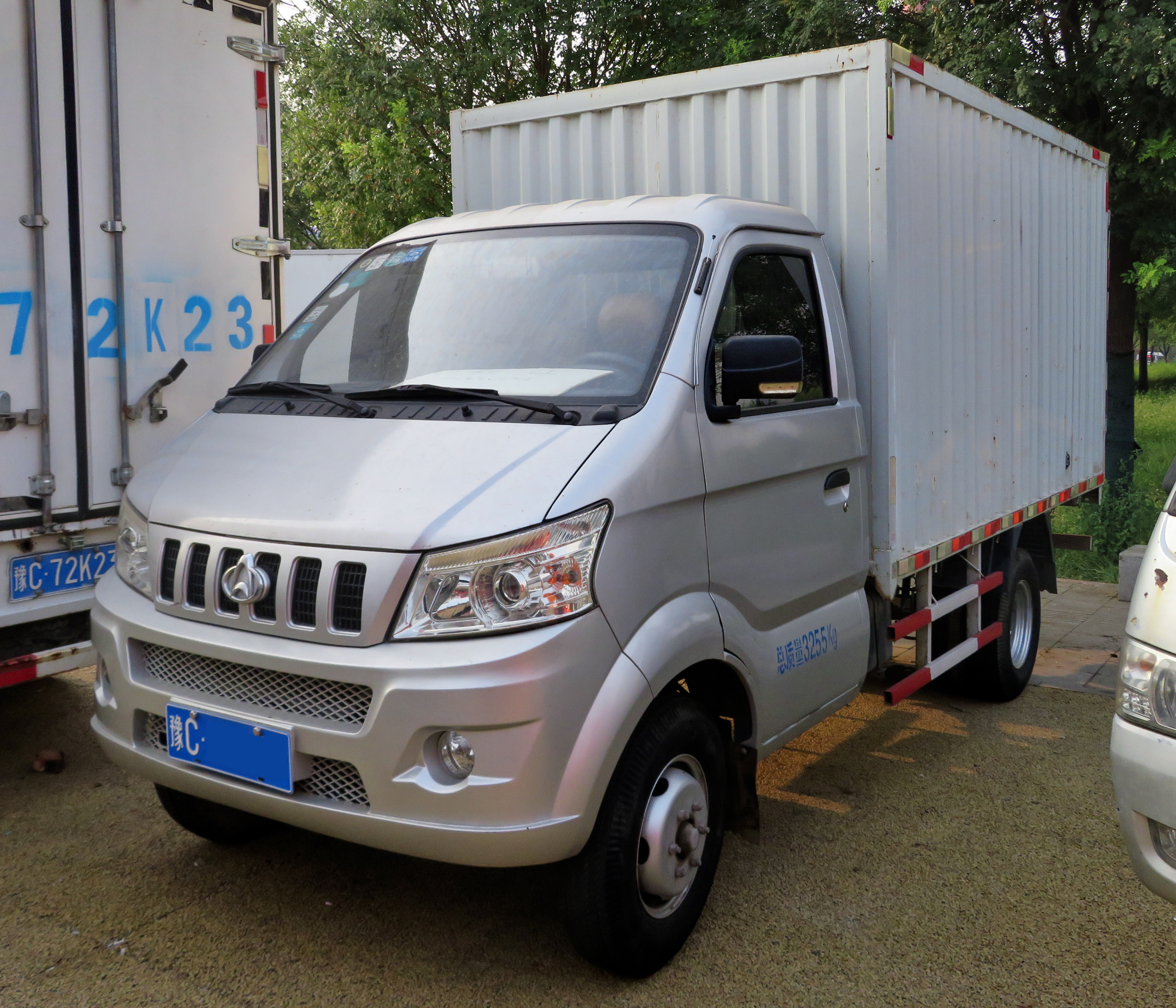
Kuayue Kuayuewang X5

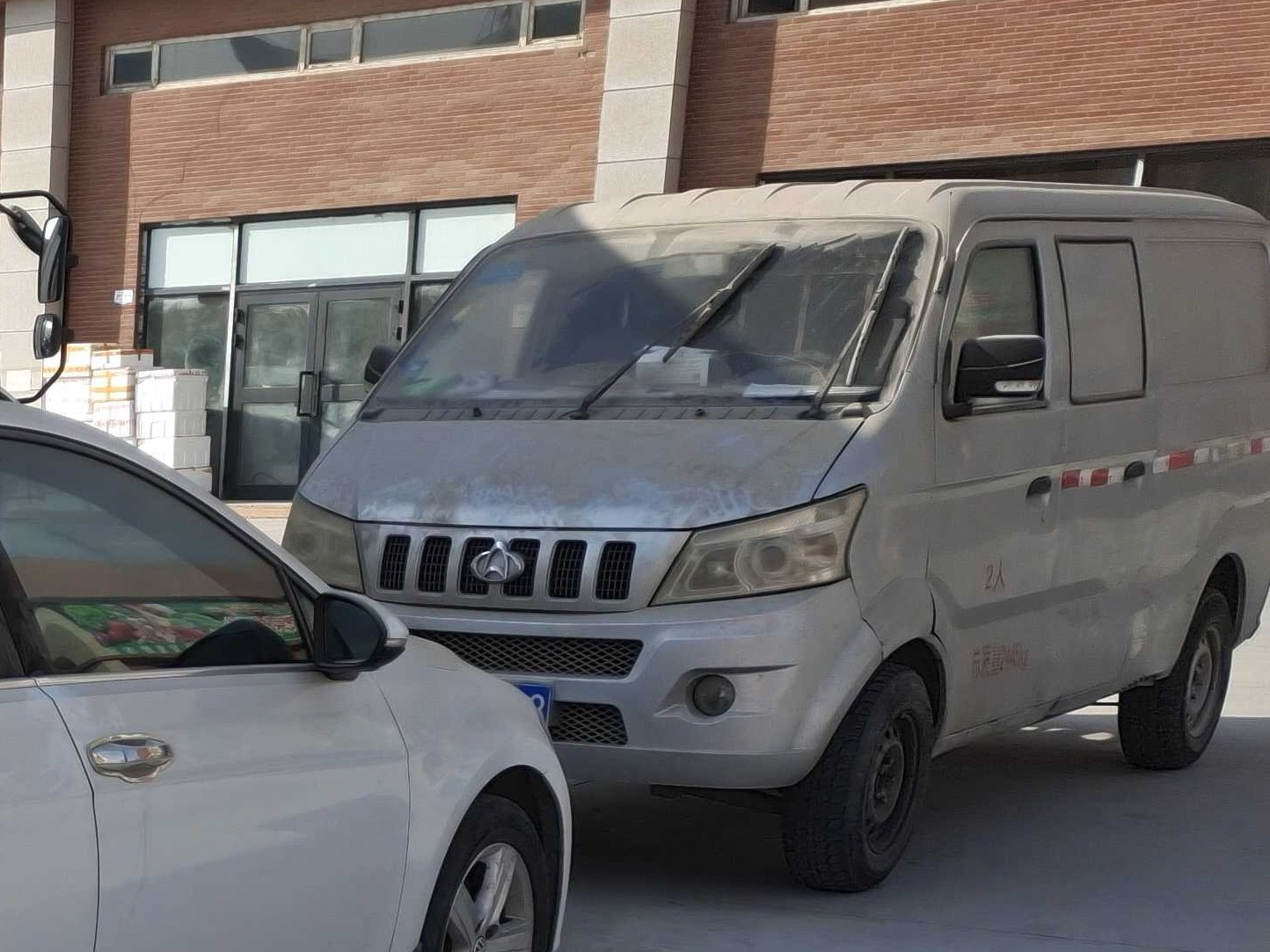
Kuayue Xinbao V5

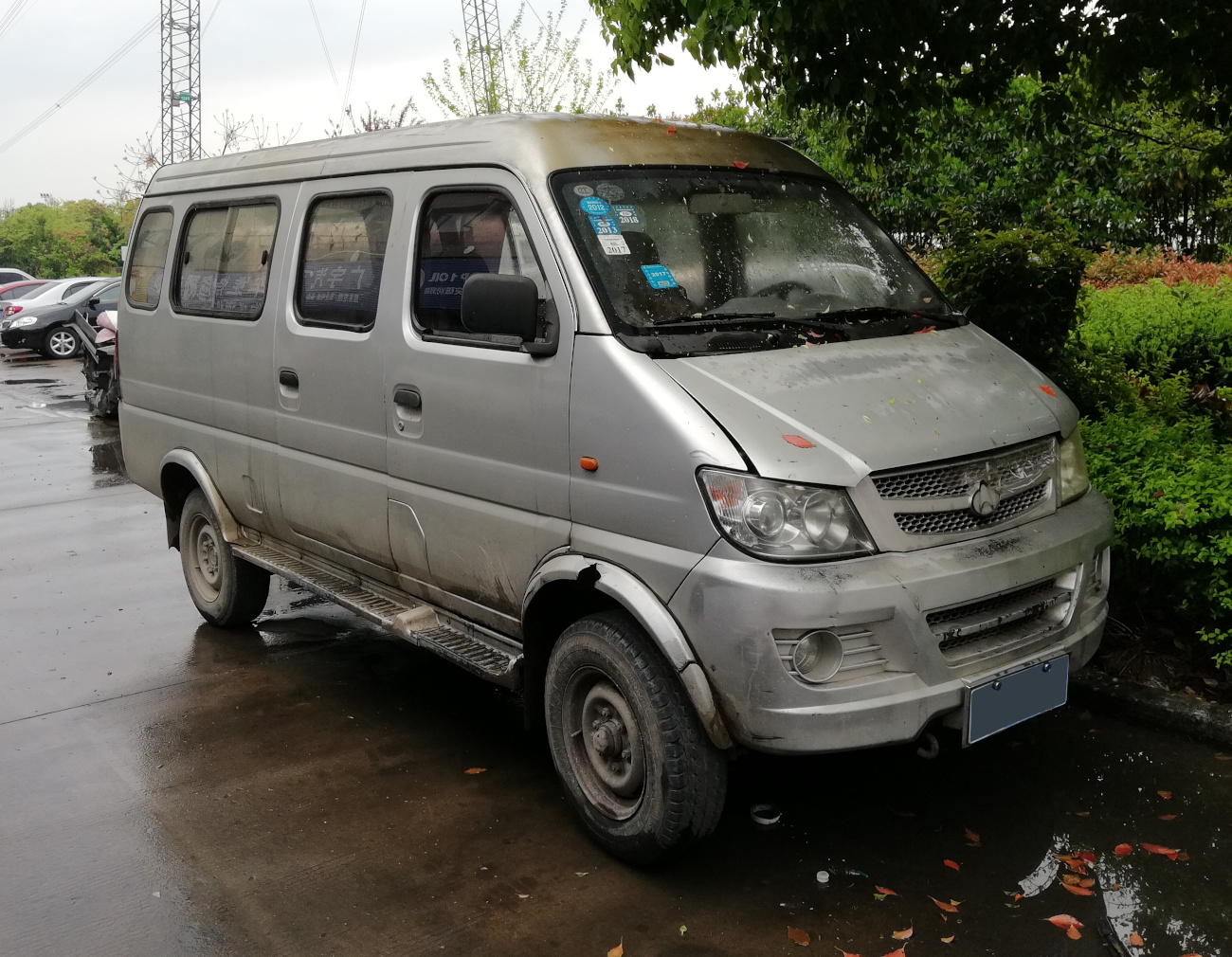
Kuayue Xunlong

=== Jiangling Investment and Jiangling Motor Holding ===
Jiangling Motor Holding Co., Ltd. (simplified Chinese: 江西江铃控股有限公司; traditional Chinese: 江西江鈴控股有限公司; pinyin: Jiāngxī Jiānglíng Kònggǔ Yǒuxiàn Gōngsī), also known as JMH, was a joint venture established in October 2004 and controlled equally by Changan and JMCG. To create JMH, Changan contributed capital in exchange for JMCG's transfer of its Jiangling Motors Corporation (JMC) equity to the venture. JMH was the largest shareholder of JMC, with a 41.03% stake as of March 2018, and also owned the Landwind marque.

In April 2019 JMCG and Changan announced plans to split JMH into two separate companies: Jiangling Investment, which would hold the 41.03% JMC stake and be equally owned by both parties, and a new JMH retaining the remaining former JMH assets including Landwind, with the new JMH issuing 100% additional shares to outside investors, reducing JMCG and Changan each to a 25% stake. Jiangling Investment was formally established in May 2019. In June 2019 it was announced that Aiways would acquire 50% of the new JMH to secure production permits for new energy vehicles.

== Former subsidiaries and ventures ==
=== Hafei (2009–2018) ===
Hafei (Chinese: 哈飞汽车; pinyin: Hāfēi Qìchē), officially Hafei Motor Co., Ltd., was a Chinese automaker that operated as a subsidiary of Changan before its operations were absorbed by Changan Ford.

In 2015 Changan announced it would discontinue all Hafei production and convert the existing lines to serve Changan Ford.

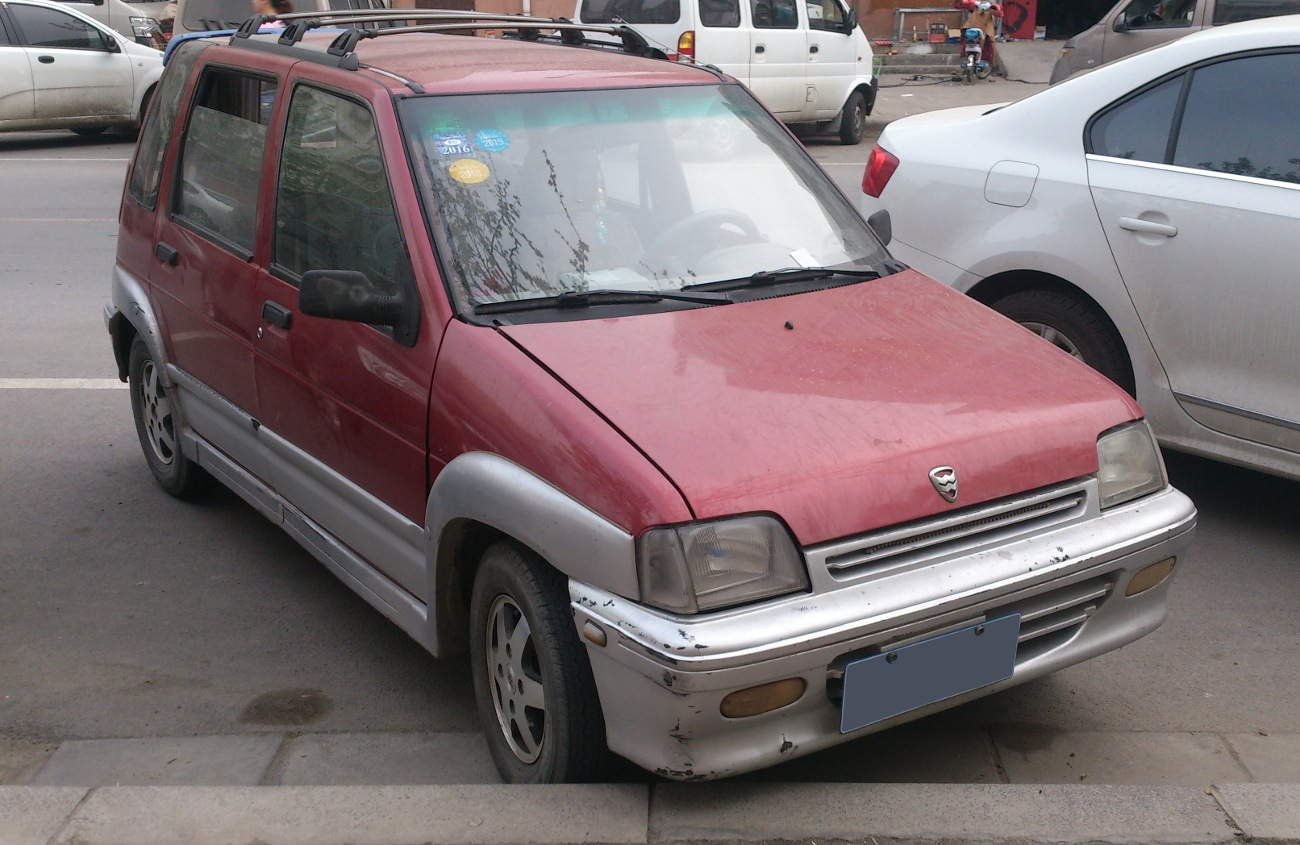
Hafei Baili

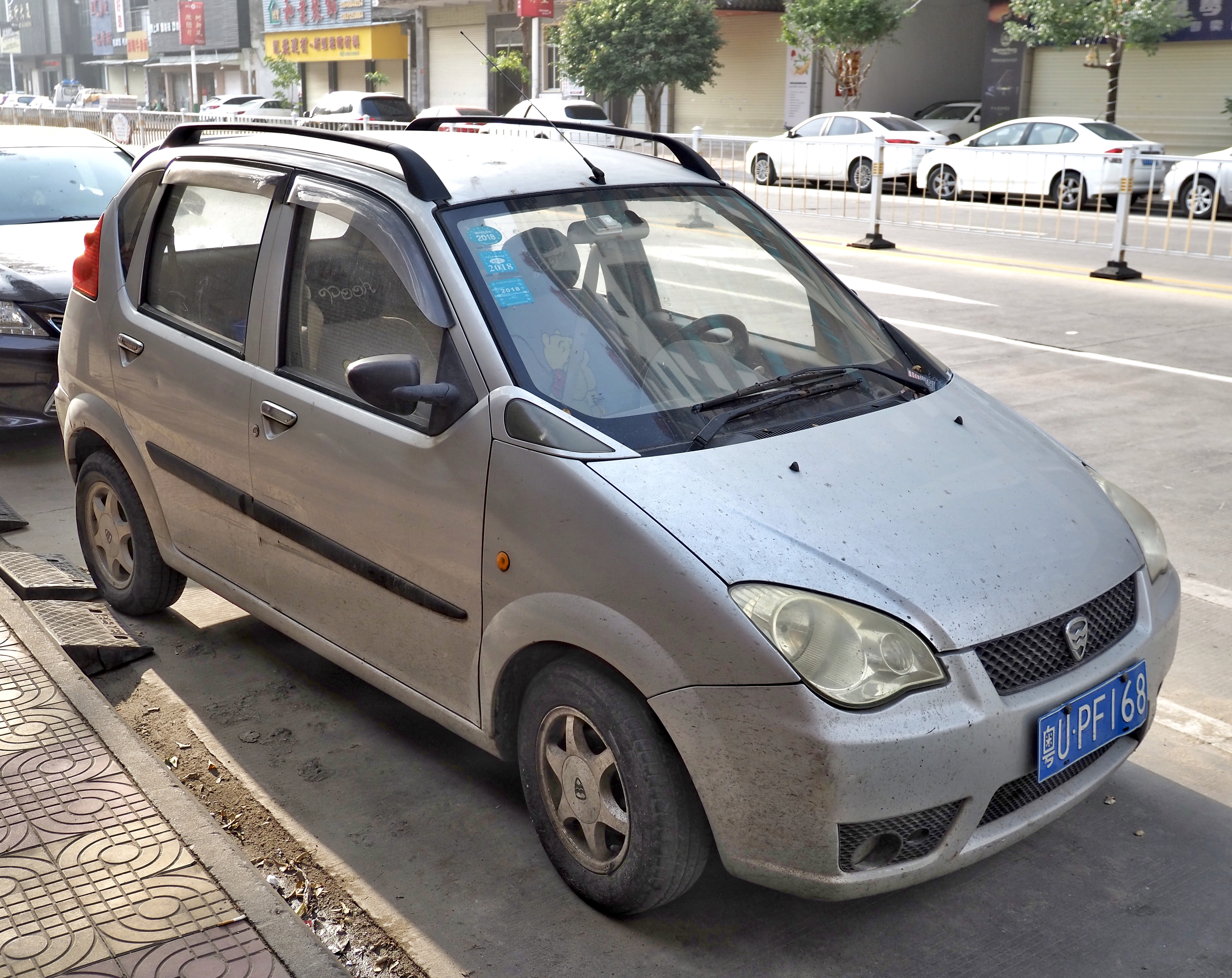
Hafei Lobo

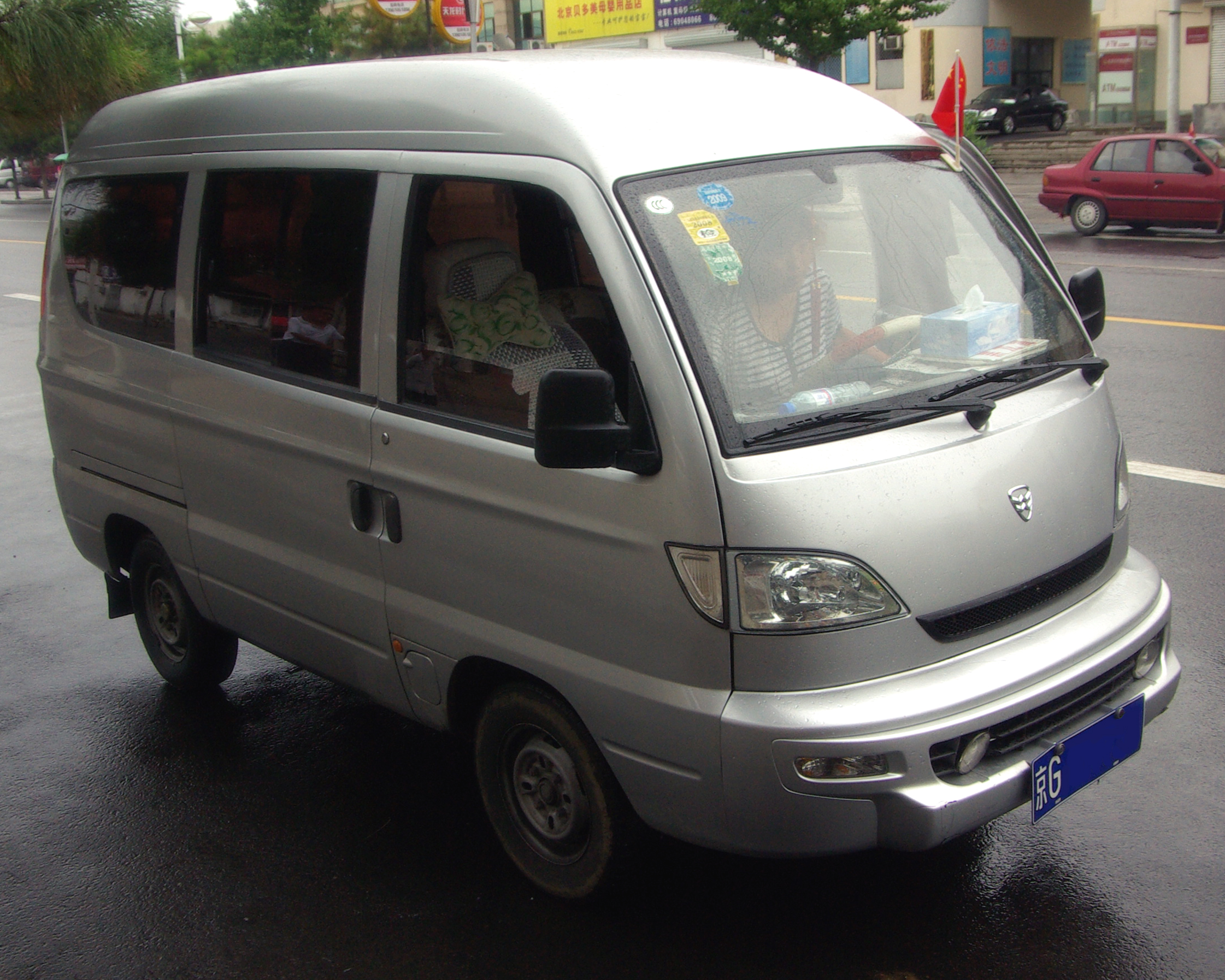
Hafei Zhongyi

=== Oshan (2017–2024) ===
Oshan (Chinese: 欧尚; pinyin: Ōushāng) was a passenger car brand under Changan Automobile, originally known as the Changan Commercial Vehicles division, which focused on microvans and light trucks before being renamed Oshan in April 2017 and repositioned toward passenger vehicles.

In 2024 Changan decided to cease the Oshan brand and integrate its product lines and sales channels into the main Changan brand.

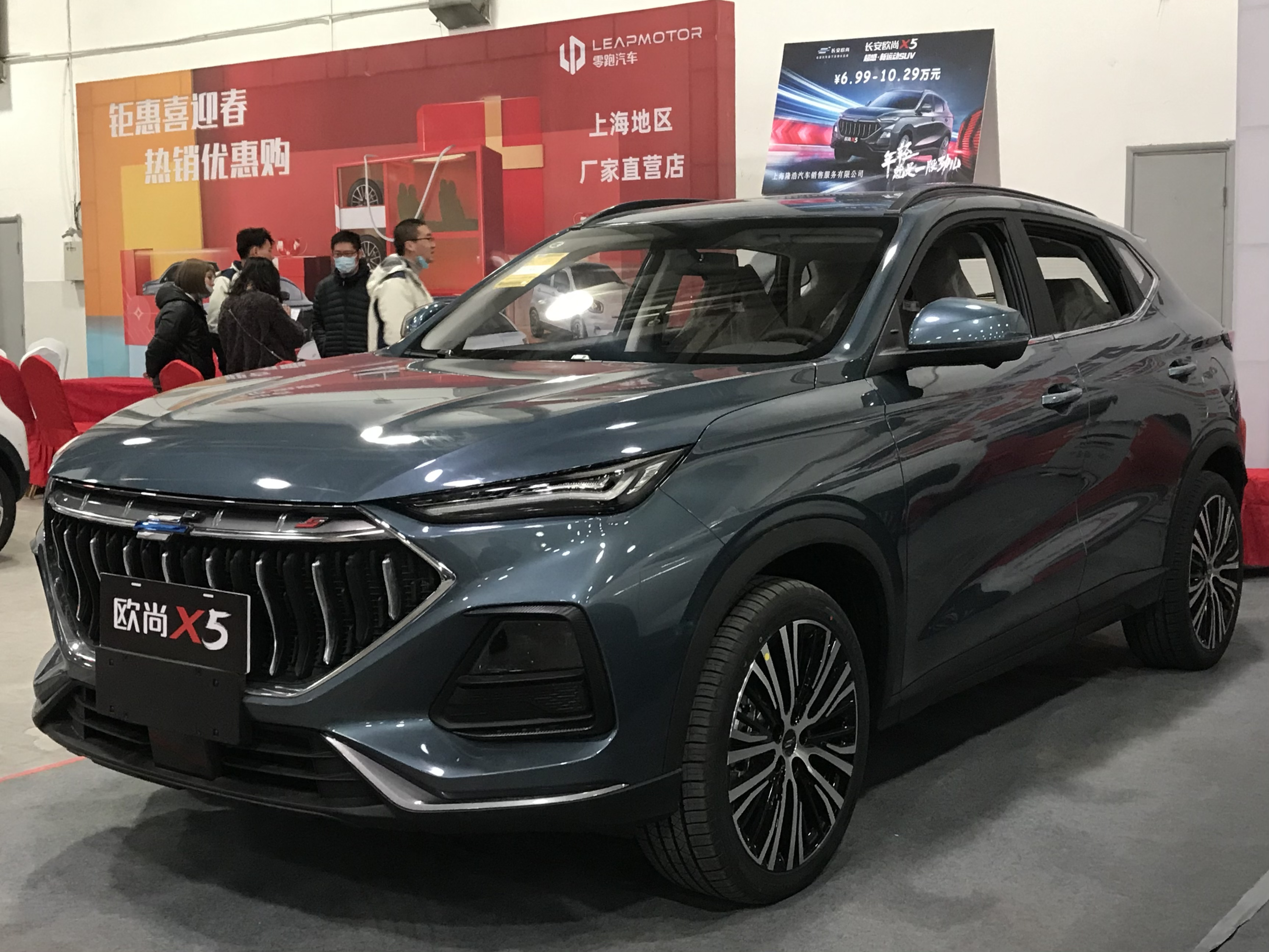
Oshan X5

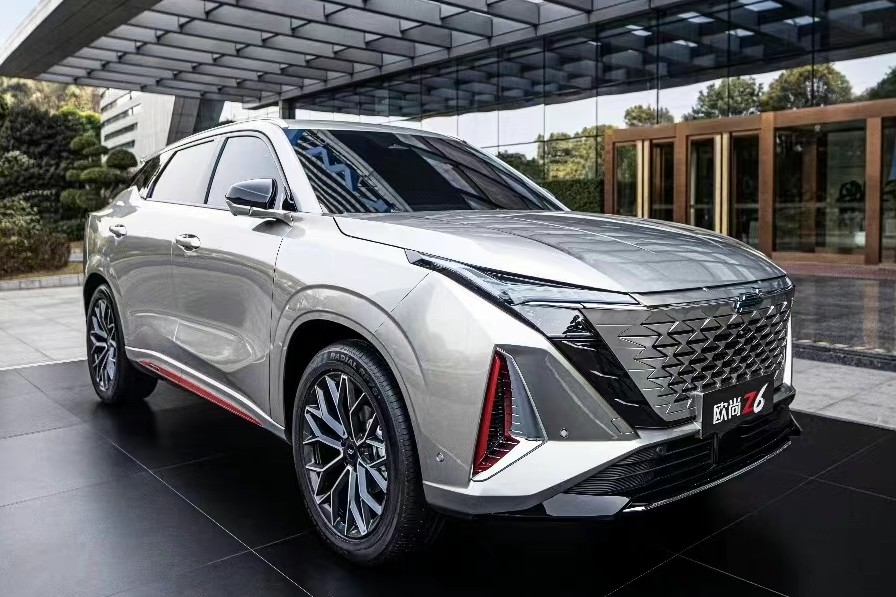
Oshan Z6

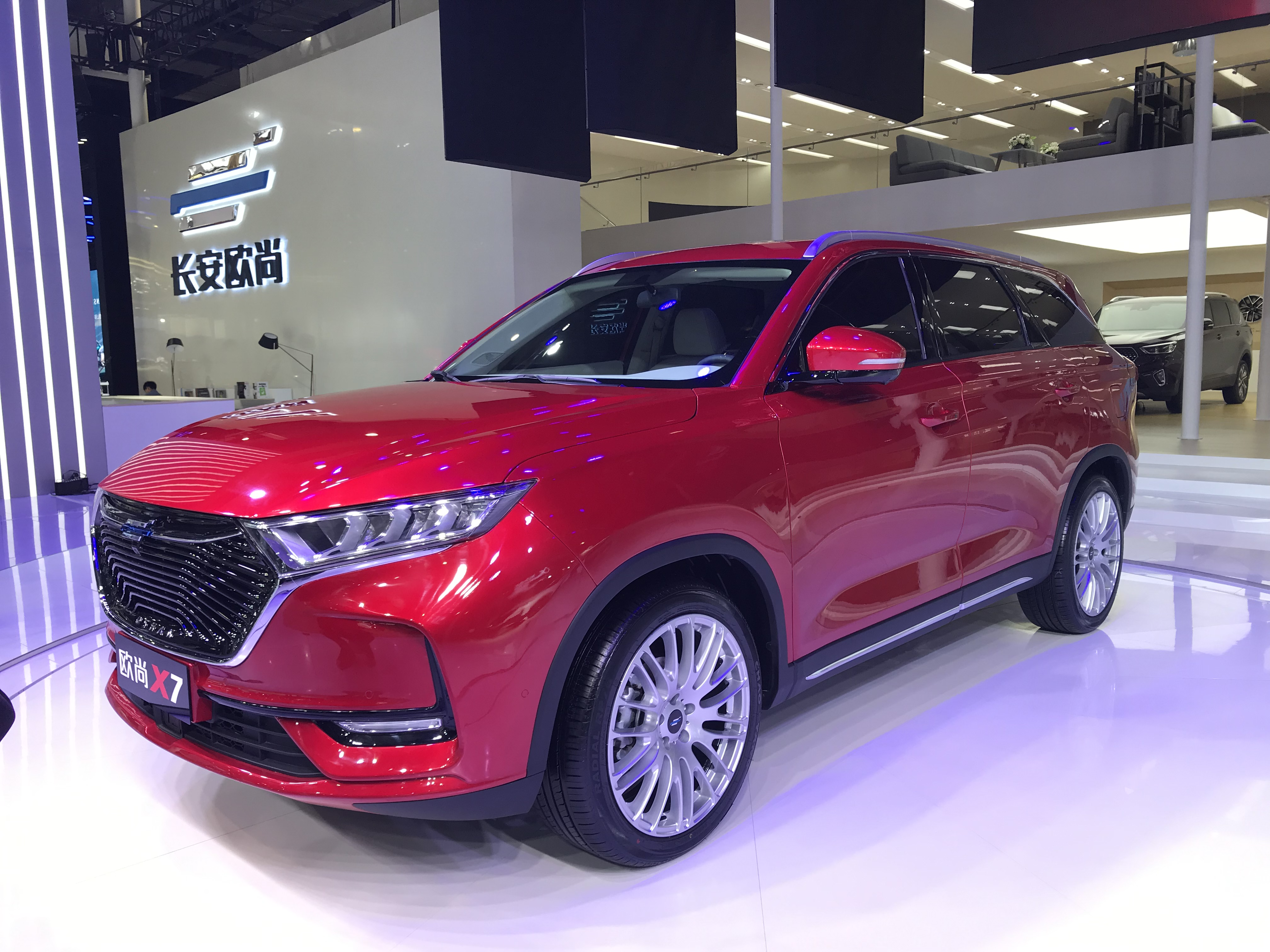
Oshan X7

=== Changan PSA (2010–2020) ===
Changan and PSA Peugeot Citroën agreed in 2010 to establish a 50/50 joint venture for passenger cars and light commercial vehicles. Named CAPSA, it was PSA's second joint venture in China and its first with Changan. Production began in 2014 at a new facility in Shenzhen, initially with China-specific Citroën DS models; the DS 5LS was followed by the DS 6WR. The venture was dissolved in 2020.

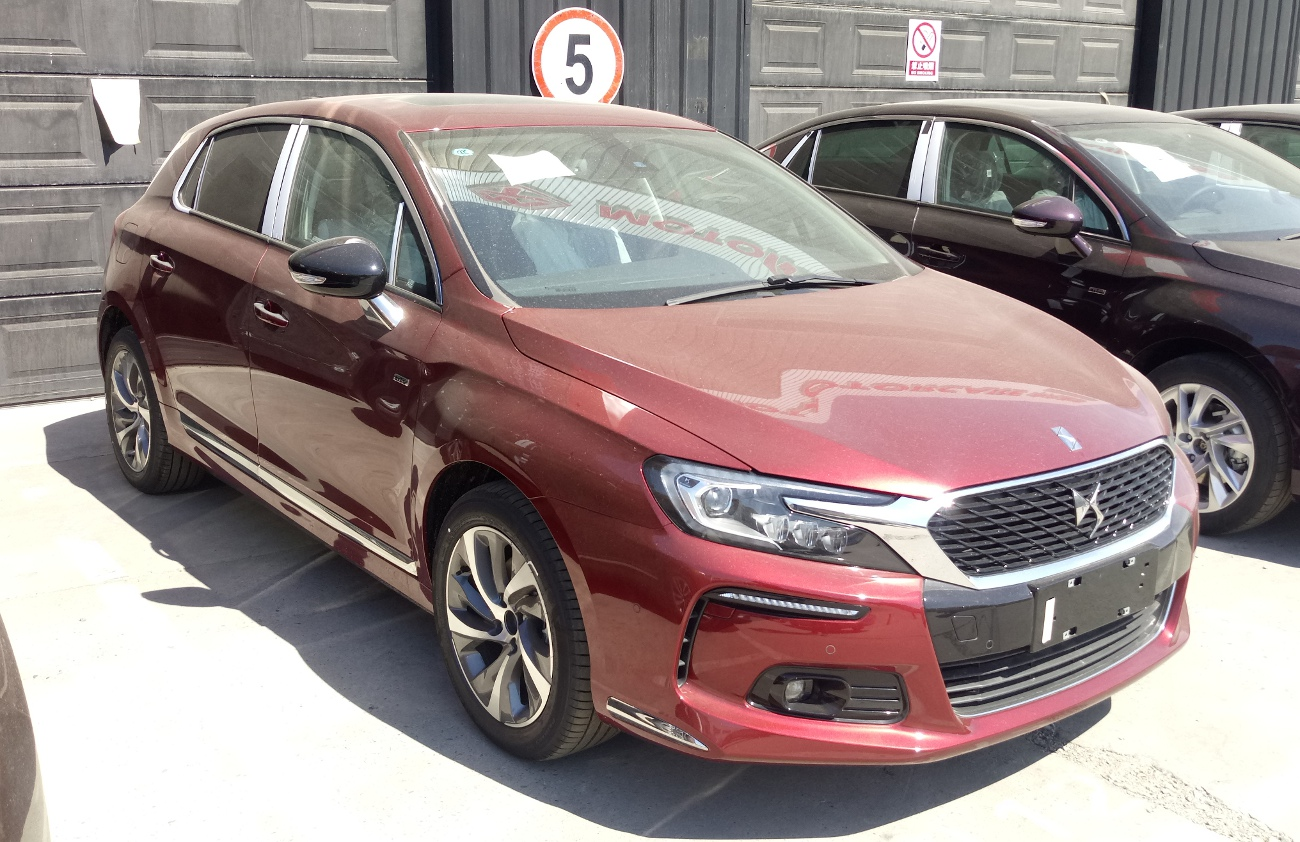
DS 4S

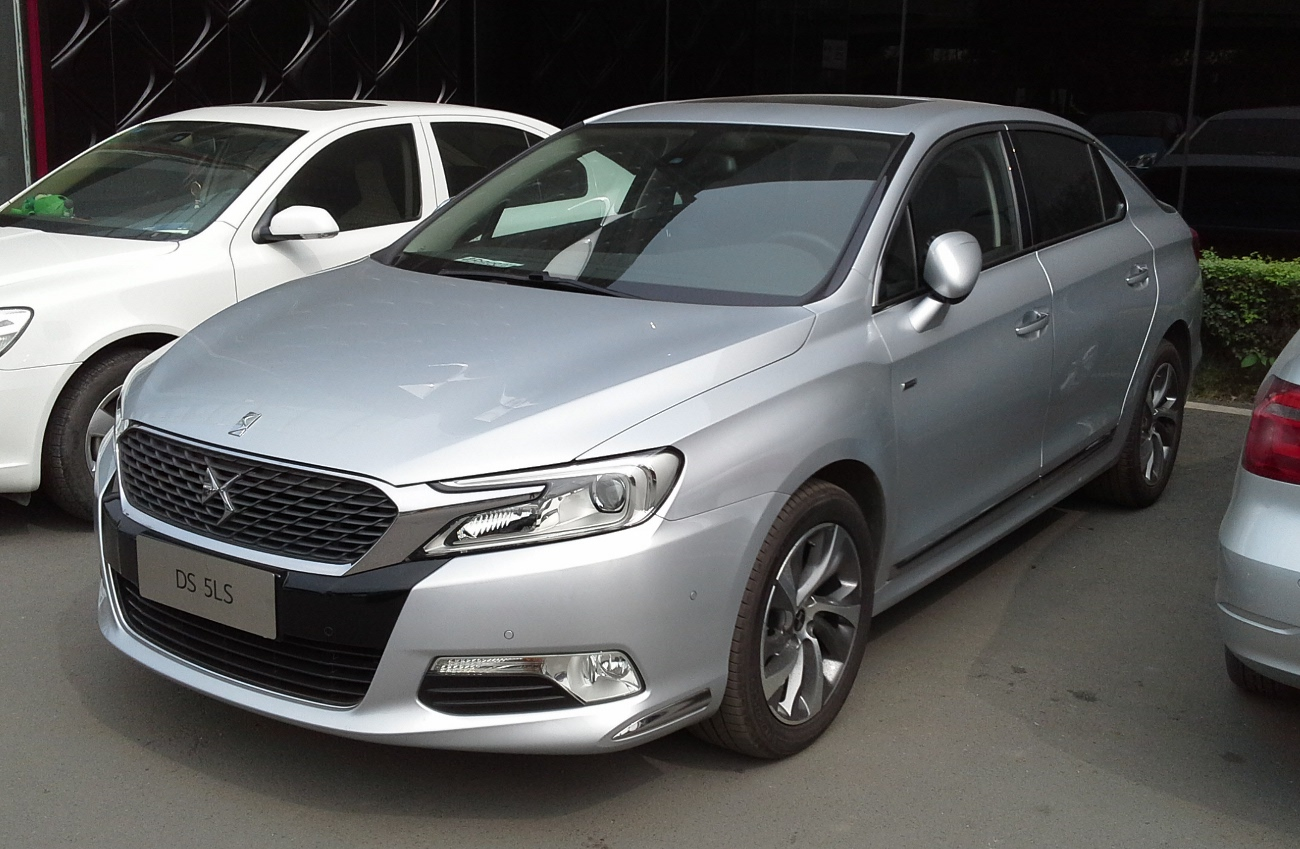
DS 5LS

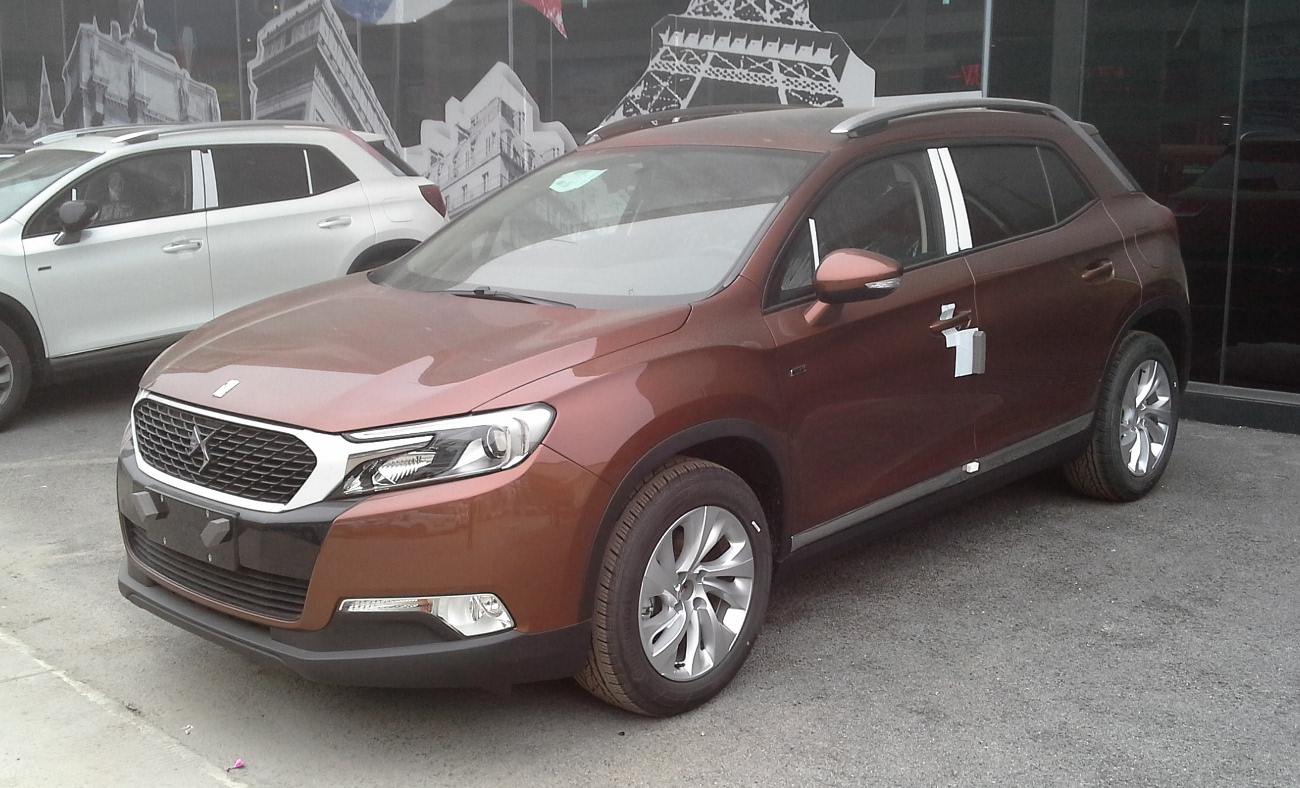
DS 6

=== Changan Suzuki (1993–2018) ===
Technical and commercial cooperation with Suzuki Motor Corporation beginning in 1983 led Changan to assemble inexpensive commercial trucks — originally the Suzuki Carry ST90 as the Changan SC112 — under licence into the 2000s. Chongqing Changan Suzuki Automobile Co. was formed in 1993 and built licensed versions of the Suzuki Alto, Suzuki Cultus, and Suzuki Swift.

On 4 September 2018 Suzuki transferred its 50% stake to Changan, ending 25 years of joint venture. Changan subsequently continued to manufacture and sell Suzuki-branded cars in China under licence. In 2021 the entity was renamed Chongqing Lingyao Automobile.

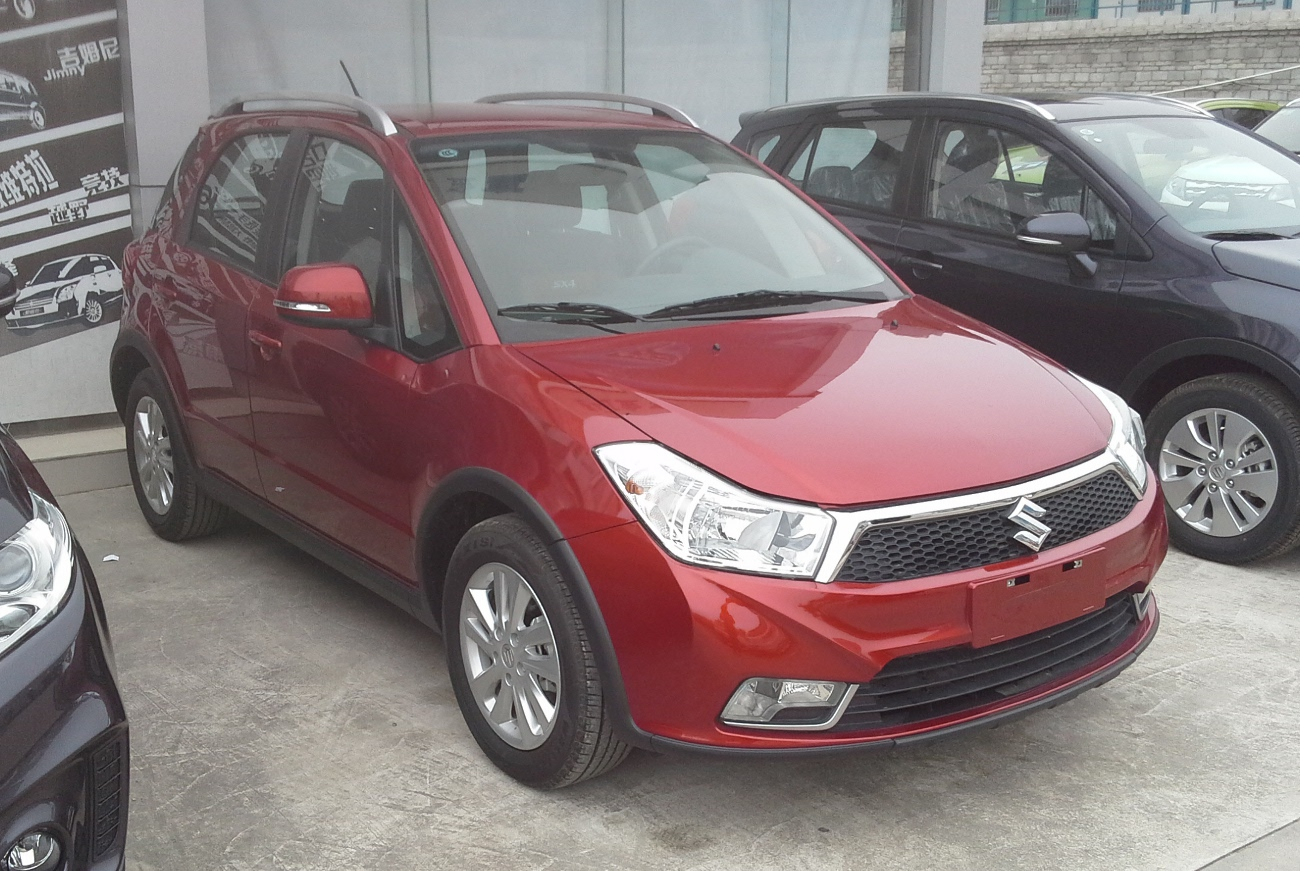
Suzuki SX4 Hatch

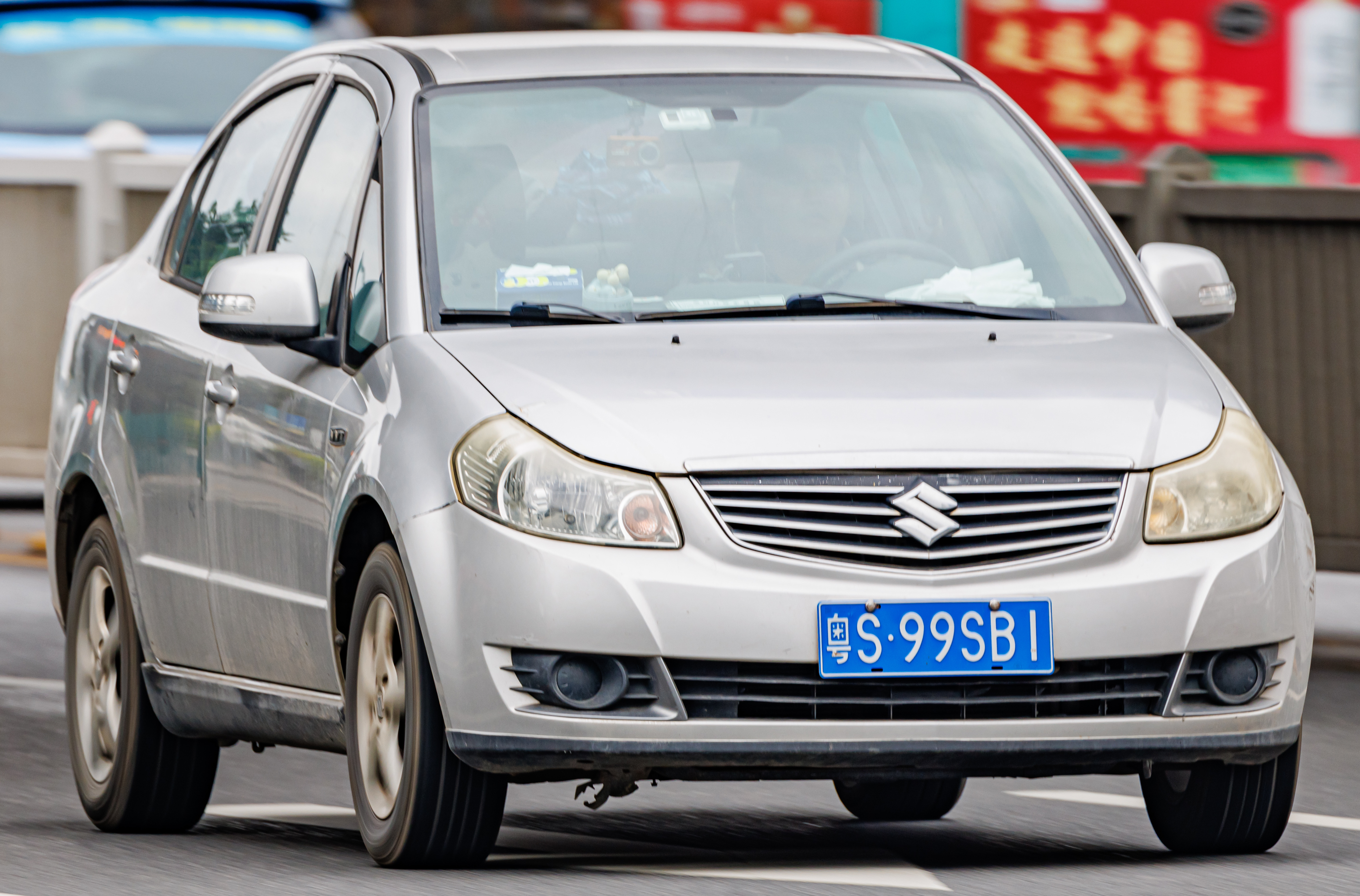
Suzuki SX4 Sedan

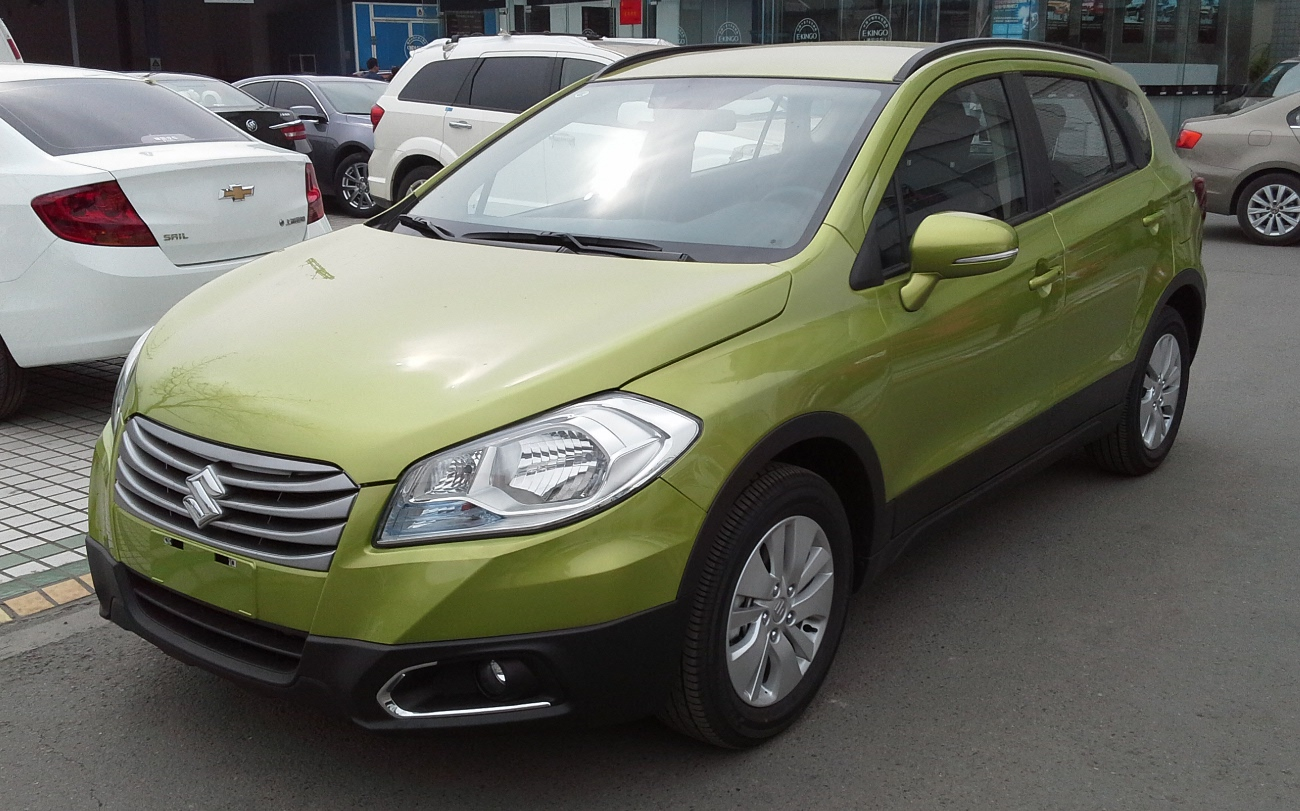
Suzuki S-Cross

== Production and research facilities ==
=== Domestic ===
Changan maintains four major production bases (in Chongqing, Hebei, Jiangsu, and Jiangxi), eleven automobile production bases, and two engine production bases in mainland China, for a broader total of 21 vehicle-making facilities that also include sites in Anhui, Guangdong, Heilongjiang, Shandong, and Shanxi.

==== Beijing ====
Changan operates an R&D centre in Beijing.

==== Chongqing ====
Changan has numerous facilities in Chongqing, including two Changan Ford plants, a Chongqing-based R&D centre, and an industrial park in Yubei.

==== Jiangxi ====
In 2005 Changan and JMCG established Jiangling Holdings in Nanchang, Jiangxi. Since Jiangling Holdings discontinued its own brands including Landwind and Aiways, its primary activity has been contract vehicle assembly for Changan Auto.

=== International ===
Changan maintains overseas R&D centres in Turin, Italy; Yokohama, Japan; Birmingham, United Kingdom; and Plymouth, Michigan, United States (opened in early 2011; relocated from Detroit in 2015).

The Changan CS35 has been assembled in the Lipetsk region of Russia since 2016.

== See also ==
- FAW Group
- Dongfeng Motor
- Automobile manufacturers and brands of China
- List of automobile manufacturers of China
- Automotive industry in China
- List of automotive manufacturers by production
