= Mazda 6e =

Mid-size car

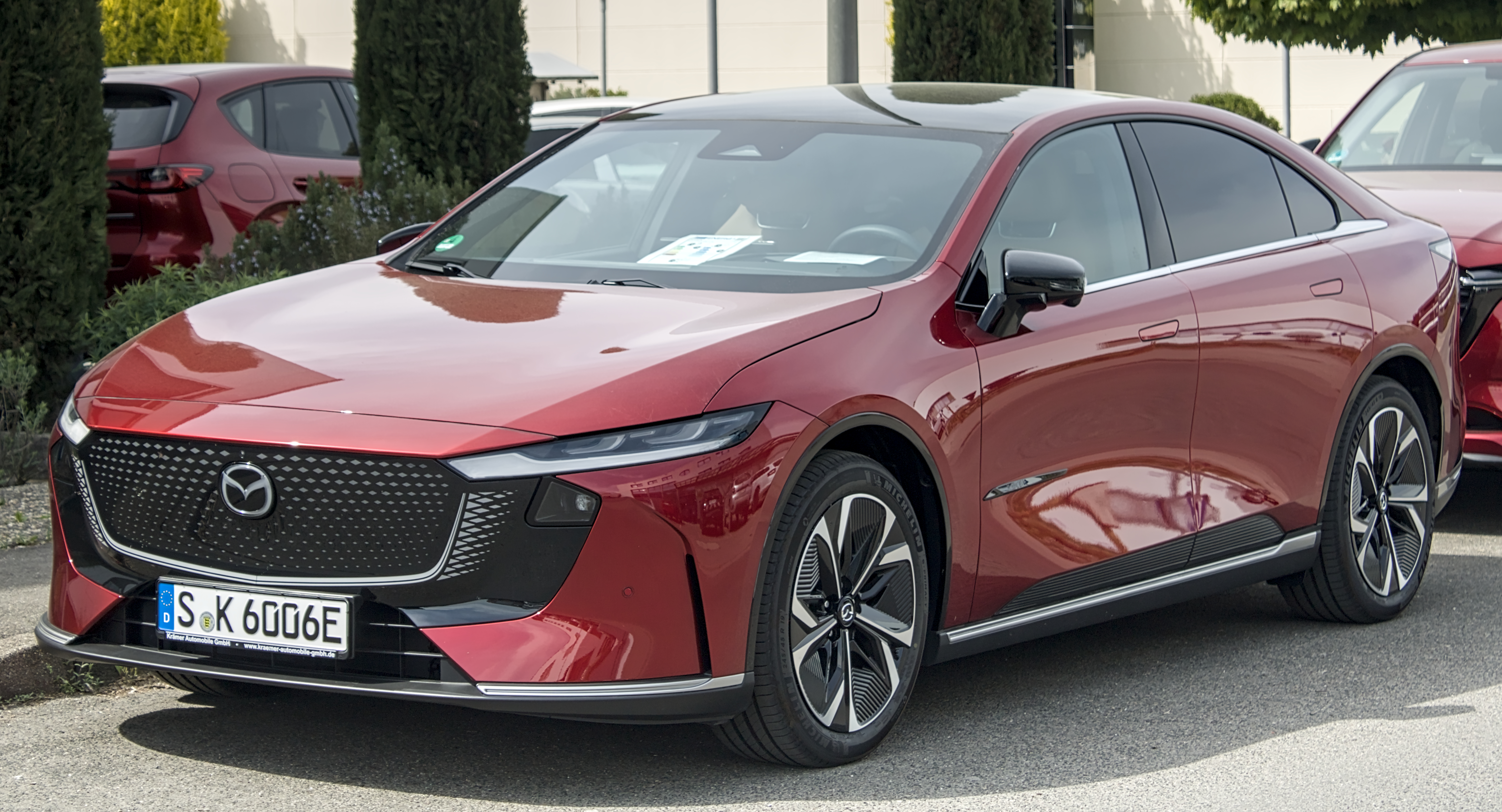

Overview
- Manufacturer: Mazda (Changan Mazda)
- Model code: J90A
- Also called: Mazda EZ-6 (China)
- Production: 2024–present
- Assembly: China: Nanjing, Jiangsu (Changan Mazda)

Body and chassis
- Class: Mid-size car (D)
- Body style: 5-door liftback sedan
- Layout: Rear-motor, rear-wheel-drive (EV); Front-engine, rear-motor, rear-wheel-drive (EREV)
- Platform: Changan EPA1 platform
- Related: Changan Nevo A07; Deepal SL03/L07; Mazda EZ-60/CX-6e

Powertrain
- Engine: Petrol range extender: 1.5 L JL473QJ I4
- Electric motor: AC induction/asynchronous, permanent magnet motors
- Hybrid drivetrain: Extended-range electric vehicle (EREV)
- Battery: 58.1 kWh LFP (EV); 68.8 kWh LFP (EV); 77.9 kWh LFP (EV; Thailand); 79.97 kWh NMC lithium-ion (EV; Europe); 18.99 kWh LFP (EREV); 28.39 kWh LFP (EREV)

Dimensions
- Wheelbase: 2,900 mm (114.2 in)
- Length: 4,921 mm (193.7 in)
- Width: 1,890 mm (74.4 in)
- Height: 1,485 mm (58.5 in)
- Curb weight: 1,778–2,037 kg (3,920–4,491 lb)

Chronology
- Predecessor: Mazda6

The Mazda 6e, known in China as the Mazda EZ-6, is a mid-size car (D-segment) produced by Mazda through its joint venture, Changan Mazda in China since 2024. Available with a pure battery electric powertrain or as an extended-range electric vehicle (EREV), the 6e is co-developed with Changan Automobile, and uses the same EPA platform used by the Deepal L07 liftback.

== Overview ==
The model was introduced at the Beijing Auto Show in April 2024 as the EZ-6. It went on sale in mid-2024 with an option of battery electric powertrain and extended-range EV (EREV). The battery electric model has an estimated electric range of 600 km (373 mi) under CLTC standards. It is claimed to have a 50-50 weight distribution.

The 6e/EZ-6 was codeveloped by teams at Changan-Mazda's Nanjing R&D center, Mazda's HQ in Hiroshima Japan, and Mazda Europe to meet each region's product preferences. According to Mazda, the vehicle has a low-drag Kodo design language and offers an electrified version of Mazda's Jinba-Ittai handling philosophy.

The 6e is equipped with a 14.6-inch central screen, powered with the Qualcomm Snapdragon 8155 chip to integrate the control of air conditioning, seats, entertainment and other functions. It is also equipped with a 14-speaker Sony sound system, 64-color ambient lighting, front "zero-gravity" seats, a 50-inch AR head-up display (AR-HUD), and a glass roof. The interior is available in Chestnut Brown or Egret White.

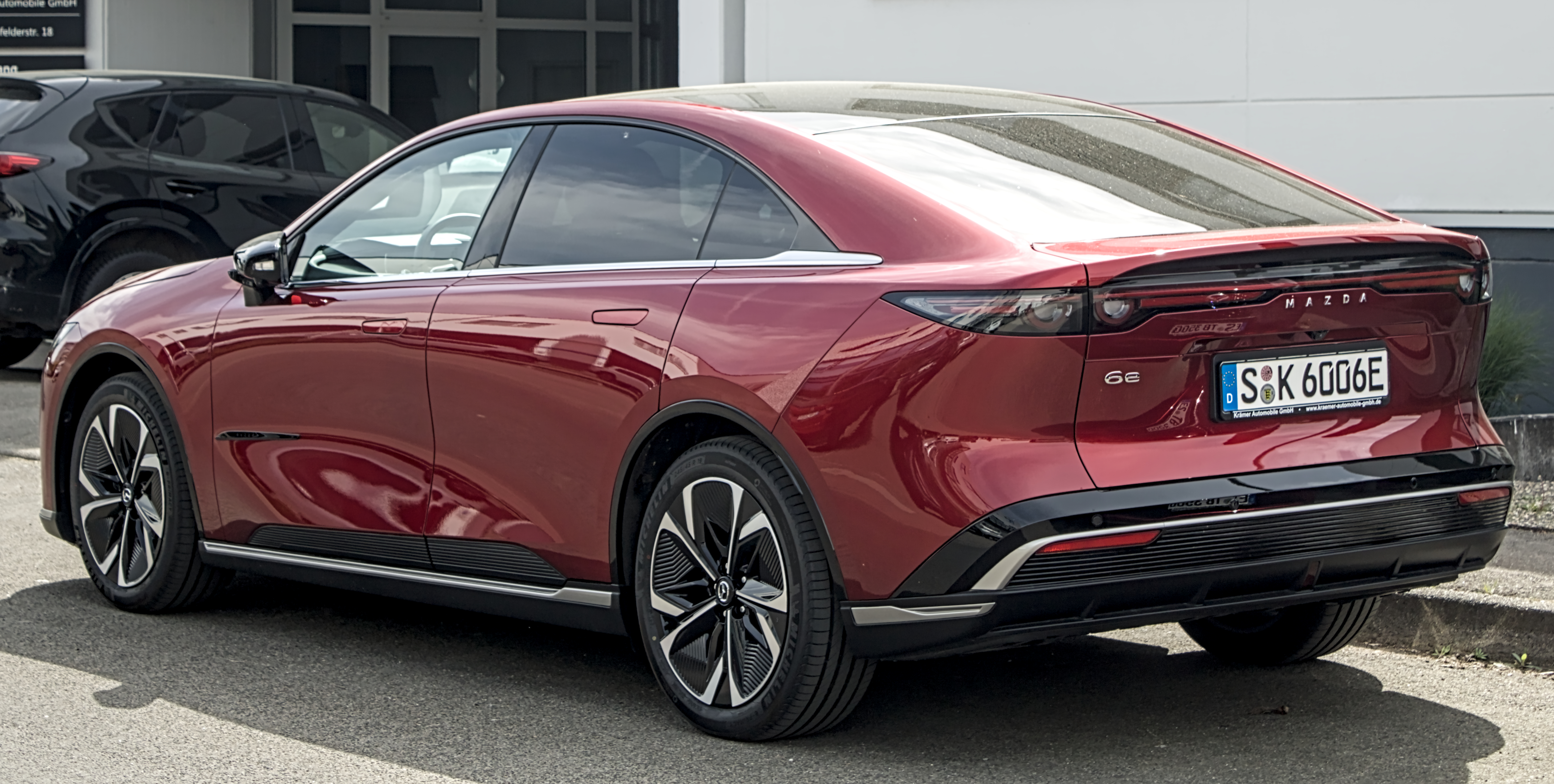
Rear view

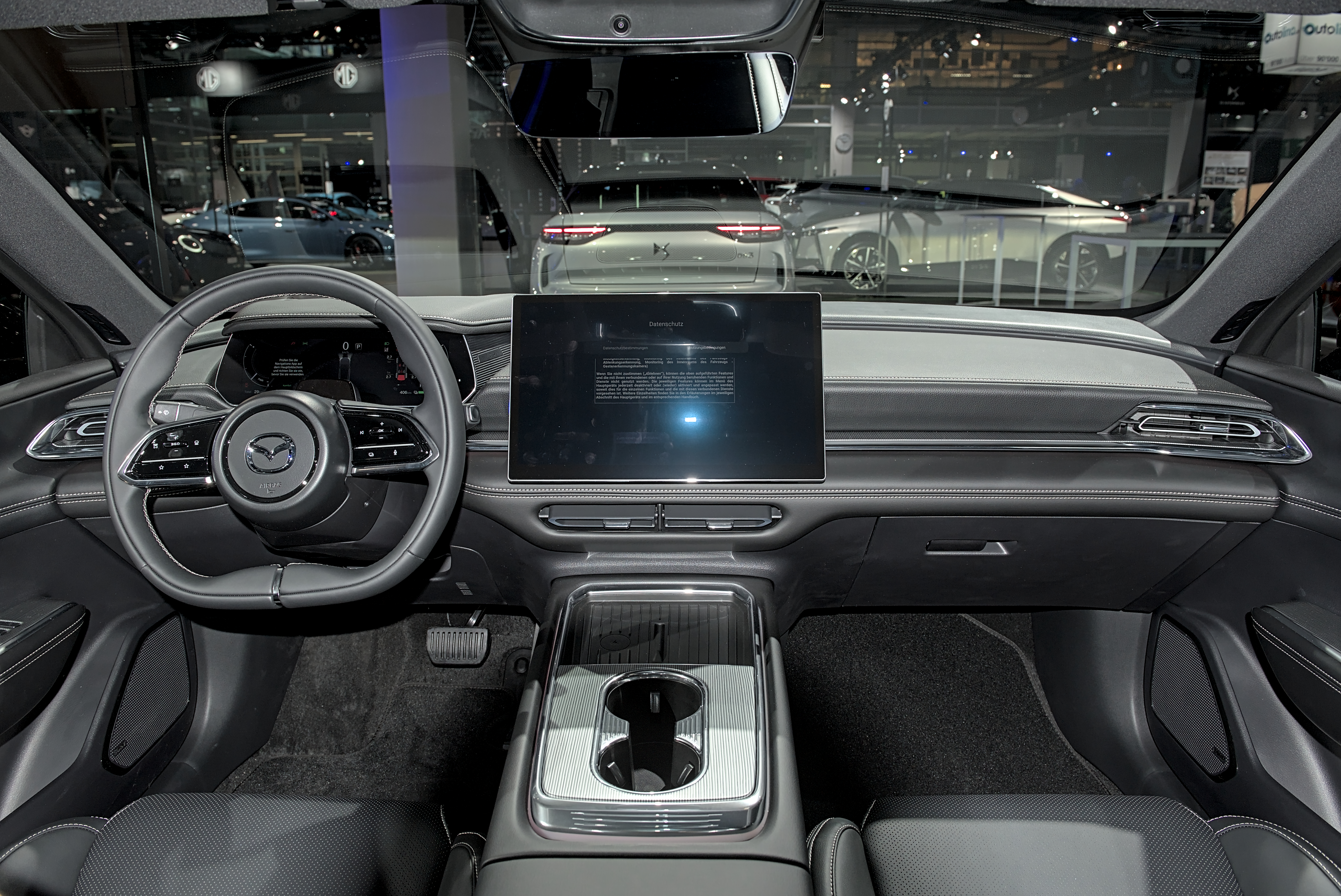
Interior

== Markets ==
=== Australia ===
The Mazda 6e was launched in Australia on 18 February 2026, with two variants: GT and Atenza, both variants are powered by the 78 kWh battery pack.

=== China ===
The EZ-6 went on sale in China in October 2024.

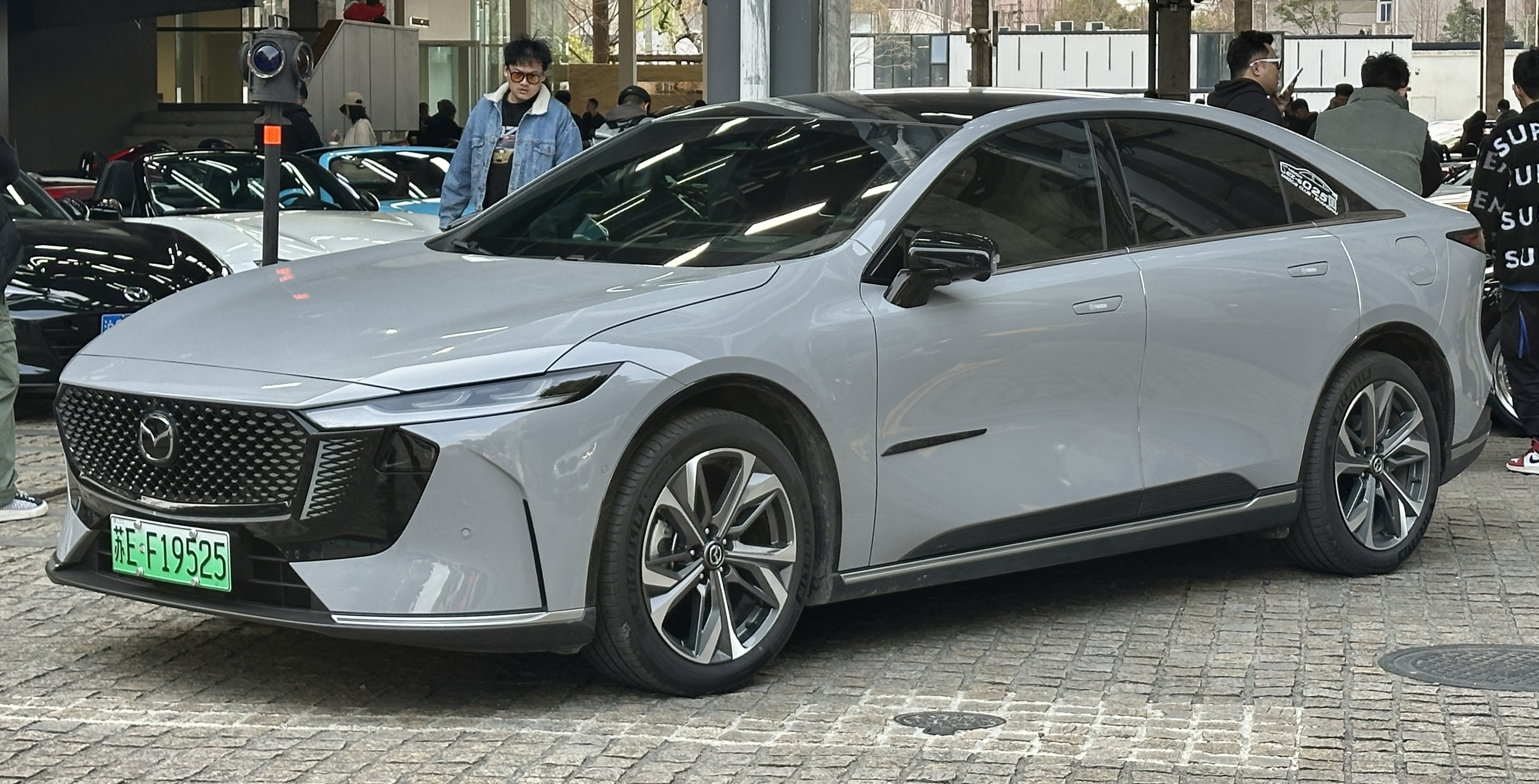
Mazda EZ-6 (China)

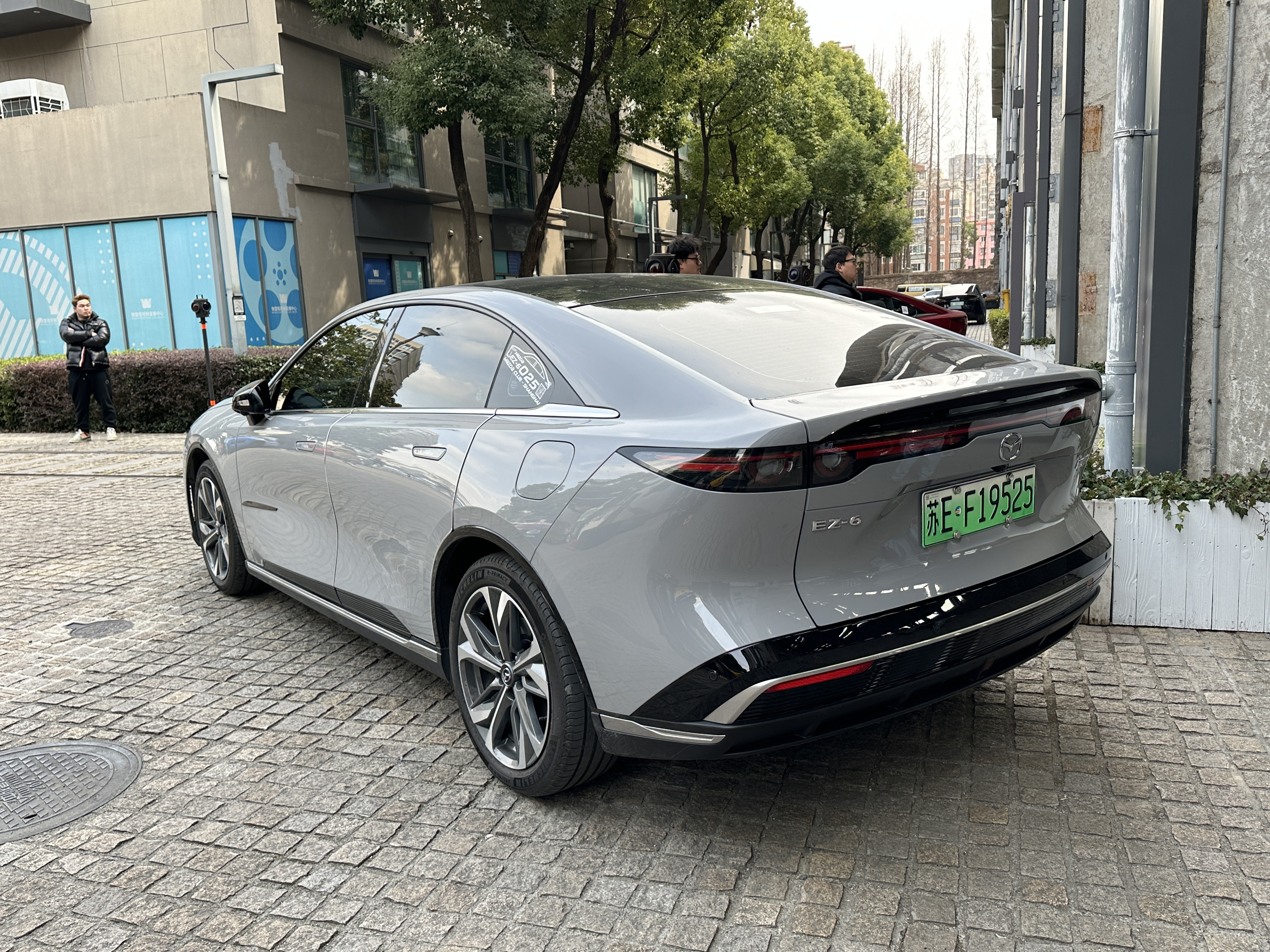
Rear view

=== Europe ===
The vehicle was introduced in Europe at the Brussels Motor Show on 10 January 2025 as the Mazda 6e. It went on sale in mid-2025 with the first shipment of 600 vehicles departing for Belgium from Shanghai in late April, with only the battery electric (BEV) version offered. For the European market, a larger 80 kWh NMC battery, not available in China, is available as an option.

=== Indonesia ===
The Mazda 6e was launched in Indonesia at the 2026 GAIKINDO Indonesia International Auto Show on 29 July 2026, alongside the CX-30 (CKD model) and CX-5. It is available in the sole variant powered by the 77.9 kWh battery pack.

=== Singapore ===
The 6e was launched in Singapore on 20 August 2026, with two variants: GT and Sports, both variants are powered by the 78 kWh battery pack.

=== Thailand ===
The Mazda 6e was launched in Thailand on 23 March 2026, with two variants: Premium and Exclusive, both variants are powered by the 77.9 kWh battery pack.

== Powertrain ==
=== Battery electric ===
Type	Battery	Layout	Electric motor	Power	Torque	Range (claimed)			Calendar years
Type	Battery	Layout	Electric motor	Power	Torque	CLTC	NEDC	WLTP	Calendar years
480 km	56.1 kWh CATL-Changan LFP	RWD	PMSM	190 kW (255 hp; 258 PS)	320 N⋅m (32.6 kg⋅m; 236 lb⋅ft)	480 km (298 mi)	N/A	N/A	2024–present
600 km	68.8 kWh CATL-Changan LFP	RWD	PMSM	190 kW (255 hp; 258 PS)	320 N⋅m (32.6 kg⋅m; 236 lb⋅ft)	600 km (373 mi)	540 km (336 mi)	478 km (297 mi)	2024–present
Long Range (Thailand & Australia)	77.9 kWh CALB-Changan LFP	RWD	PMSM	190 kW (255 hp; 258 PS)	320 N⋅m (32.6 kg⋅m; 236 lb⋅ft)	N/A	654 km (406 mi)	N/A	2026–present (Thailand & Australia)
Long Range	80 kWh NMC lithium-ion	RWD	PMSM	180 kW (241 hp; 245 PS)	320 N⋅m (32.6 kg⋅m; 236 lb⋅ft)	N/A	560 km (348 mi)	552 km (343 mi)	2025–present (Europe)

=== Range extender electric ===
Type	Engine		Battery	Layout	Electric motor			Electric range (claimed)		Calendar years
Type	Displ.	Power	Battery	Layout	Type	Power	Torque	CLTC	WLTP	Calendar years
130 km	JL473QJ 1,480 cc (1.5 L) I4	70 kW (94 hp; 95 PS)	18.9 kWh CALB LFP	RWD	PMSM	160 kW (215 hp; 218 PS)	320 N⋅m (32.6 kg⋅m; 236 lb⋅ft)	130 km (81 mi)	105 km (65 mi)	2024–present
200 km	JL473QJ 1,480 cc (1.5 L) I4	70 kW (94 hp; 95 PS)	28.4 kWh CALB LFP	RWD	PMSM	160 kW (215 hp; 218 PS)	320 N⋅m (32.6 kg⋅m; 236 lb⋅ft)	200 km (124 mi)	160 km (99 mi)	2024–present

== Safety ==
=== C-NCAP ===
C-NCAP (2024) test results 2024 Mazda EZ-6 智雅 600 (EV)
Category		%
Overall:	5 /5 stars	90.8%
Occupant protection:		97.10%
Vulnerable road users:		79.37%
Active safety:		88.02%

=== Euro NCAP ===
Euro NCAP test results Mazda 6e 68.8 kWh (2025)
Test	Points	%
Overall:	5 /5 stars	
Adult occupant:	37.4	93%
Child occupant:	46.0	93%
Pedestrian:	47.1	74%
Safety assist:	14.0	77%

=== ANCAP ===
ANCAP test results Mazda 6e (2025, aligned with Euro NCAP)
Test	Points	%
Overall:	5 /5 stars	
Adult occupant:	37.39	93%
Child occupant:	46.00	93%
Pedestrian:	47.12	74%
Safety assist:	14.28	79%

== Sales ==
Year	China		
Year	EV	EREV	Total
2024	683	1,844	2,527
2025	1,459	5,621	7,080
