= Changan Ford Mazda =

Chinese automotive manufacturing company

Changan Ford Mazda Automobile Co., Ltd.
- Native name: 长安福特马自达汽车有限公司
- Type: joint venture
- Industry: Automotive
- Founded: April 2001 (Chongqing)
- Defunct: December 2012
- Fate: Separated into Changan Ford and Changan Mazda
- Successor: Changan Ford Automobile Co., Ltd. Changan Mazda Automobile Co., Ltd.
- Headquarters: Chongqing, China
- Area served: China
- Key people: Marin Burela (CEO)
- Products: Automobiles
- Owner: Changan Automobile (50%); Ford Motor Company (35%); Mazda (15%)

Changan Ford Mazda
- Traditional Chinese: 長安福特馬自達
- Simplified Chinese: 长安福特马自达
- Literal meaning: Chang'an Ford Mazda
Transcriptions
Standard Mandarin
- Hanyu Pinyin: Cháng'ān Fútè Mǎzìdá
- Wade–Giles: Ch'ang^{2}-an^{1} Fu^{2}-t'e^{4} Ma^{3}-tzu^{4}-ta^{2}

Changan Ford Mazda (officially Changan Ford Mazda Automobile Co., Ltd.) was an automotive manufacturing company headquartered in Chongqing, China and a joint venture between Changan Automobile, Ford Motor Company and Mazda. Its principal activity was the manufacture and sale of Ford and Mazda branded passenger cars in China.

In December 2012 the activities of Changan Ford Mazda were restructured and separated into two new joint ventures: Changan Ford Automobile Co., Ltd. and Changan Mazda Automobile Co., Ltd. Changan Ford was established as a 50:50 joint venture between Changan and Ford incorporated in Chongqing and assumed all of Changan Ford Mazda's Ford-related business. Changan Mazda was established as a 50:50 joint venture between Changan and Mazda incorporated in Nanjing and assumed all of Changan Ford Mazda's Mazda-related business.

== History ==
=== 2001 to 2010 ===
Changan Ford Automobile Co., Ltd. was established in April 2001 as a 50-50 joint venture between Ford Motor Company and Changan Automobile. Operations began in 2003, with 20,000 Ford Fiestas produced in that year. Production was initially based upon knockdown kits, partially assembled vehicles imported to meet local assembly regulations.

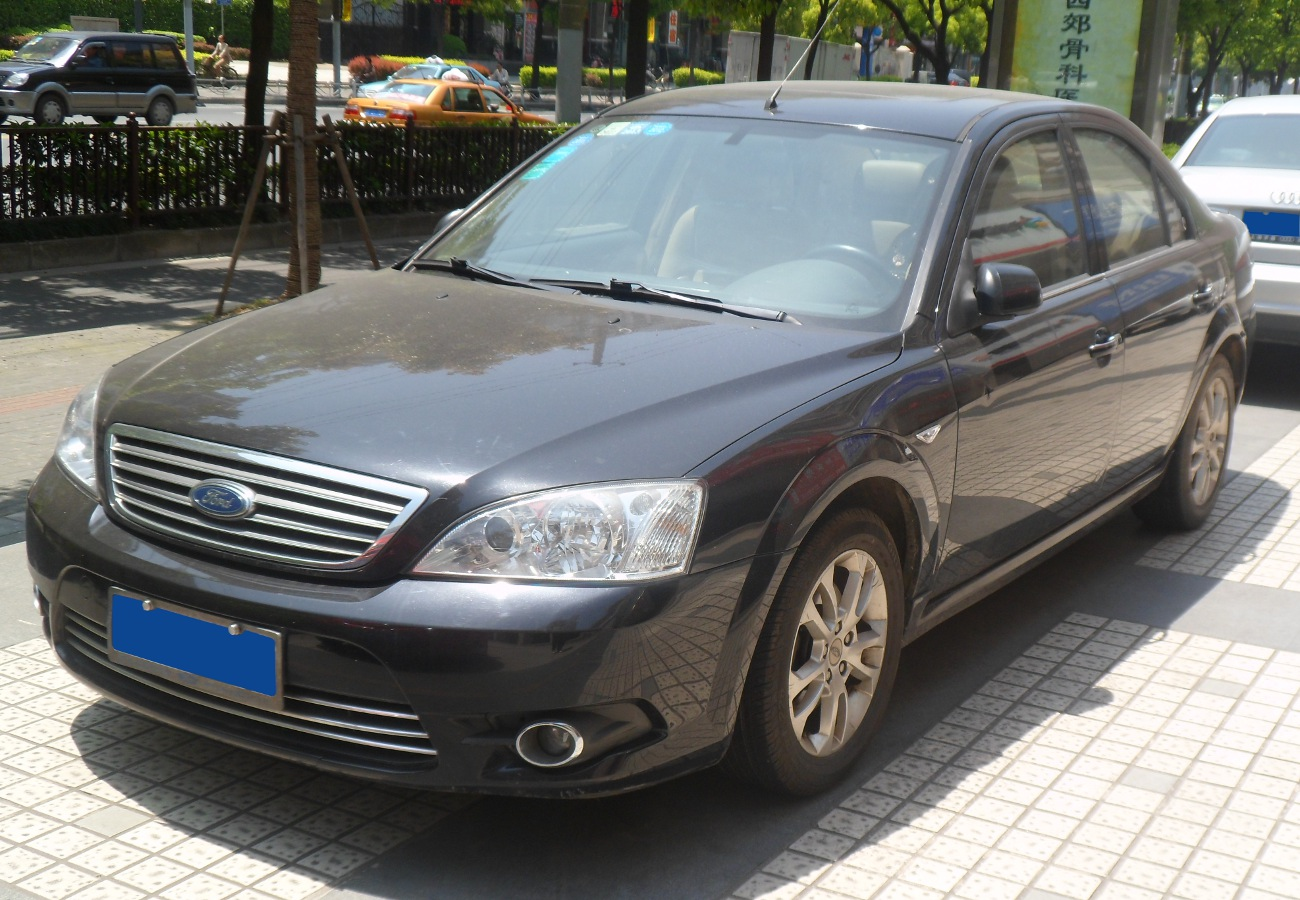
Changan Ford Mondeo

Capacity was increased to 50,000 vehicles in 2004 and to 150,000 soon after, and the Ford Mondeo and Ford Escape-based Maverick SUV also entered production.

In April 2005 it was announced that Changan Ford's Chongqing factory would begin assembling the Ford Focus model, and that Ford, Changan Automotive Group and Mazda would establish a new joint venture company, Chang'an Ford Mazda Engine, to build a new engine plant in Nanjing capable of producing 350,000 units annually.

In March 2006 it was announced that Changan Ford would begin producing Volvo automobiles later in that year, with the S40 saloon the first vehicle to enter production. In February 2009, production of the China-only S80L commenced. The joint-venture between Volvo and Changan Ford ended in late 2015.

Mazda acquired a 15% stake in Changan Ford from Ford on 4 April 2006, with the company being renamed Changan Ford Mazda Automobile Co., Ltd.

Changan Ford Mazda opened a new assembly plant in Nanjing in September 2007, constructed at a cost of US$510 million and with an initial production capacity of 160,000 vehicles per annum.

In September 2009, Changan Ford Mazda announced plans to invest US$490 million in the construction of a second assembly plant in Chongqing, with a planned annual capacity of 150,000 vehicles. The plant opened in February 2012.

=== 2010 to 2019 ===
In early April 2012, Changan Ford Mazda announced plans to invest US$600 million in the expansion of its manufacturing facilities in Chongqing, increasing its total unit capacity by 350,000 vehicles to 950,000. Later in the same month, Changan Ford Mazda announced plans to invest US$760 million in the construction of a new vehicle assembly plant in Hangzhou with an initial capacity of 250,000 units. The plant is planned for completion in 2015.

In late 2012, China approved the division of Changan Ford Mazda into two new joint ventures, Changan Ford Automobile Co., Ltd. and Changan Mazda Automobile Co., Ltd.

In January 2019, Mazda acquired Ford's stake in Changan Ford Mazda Engine Co., Ltd. & renamed the company Changan Mazda Engine Co., Ltd., which is now owned 50% by Mazda & 50% by Changan.

== Sales ==
Calendar year	Total sales
2004	
2005	61,013
2006	126,790
2007	217,100
2008	204,334
2009	315,791
2010	403,283
2011	320,658*

- Ford branded joint venture car sales
