= Changan Ford =

Automotive manufacturing company

Changan Ford Automobile Co., Ltd.
- Type: Joint venture
- Industry: Automotive
- Predecessor: Changan Ford Mazda
- Founded: 2012; 14 years ago
- Founders: Changan; Ford
- Headquarters: Chongqing, China
- Area served: China
- Key people: Ai Xiaoming (President and CEO); Yang Dayong (Executive Vice President)
- Products: Automobiles
- Owner: Changan Automobile (50%); Ford Motor Company (50%)
- Number of employees: 10,000+
- Website: ford.com.cn

Changan Ford (simplified Chinese: 长安福特; traditional Chinese: 長安福特; pinyin: Cháng'ān Fútè; full name Changan Ford Automobile Co., Ltd.) is a Chinese automotive manufacturing company headquartered in Chongqing. It is a 50/50 joint venture between local Changan Automobile and US-based Ford Motor Company. The company's principal activity is the manufacture of Ford brand passenger cars for the Chinese market. The company was formed in December 2012 after the decision to restructure Changan Ford Mazda, whereby Ford and Mazda agreed to work with Changan as separate joint ventures. Currently, Changan Ford's entire production base is the largest manufacturing location outside Detroit, Michigan, for Ford. It has plants in Chongqing, Hangzhou and Harbin.

== History ==
In late 2012, China approved division of the Changan Ford Mazda joint venture 50-50 into separate Ford and Mazda components.

In 2013, Changan Ford opened a new engine plant in Chongqing with an investment of US$500 million. Changan-Ford revealed the Jiayue sub-brand in May 2014. On 18 June 2014, Changan Ford opened its transmission plant in Chongqing with an investment of US$350 million. This is the first transmission plant for Ford in the Asia-Pacific region. During this period, the company nearly doubled market share to 4.5 percent within two years.

In 2015, Changan Ford acquired Harbin Hafei Automobile Group Co, a subsidiary of Chongqing Changan's parent company, for vehicle production started in the second half of 2016. The 2015 acquisition of the automobile facility had expanded Changan Ford's production in China by 200,000 vehicles every year. Production of Jiayue should have started in 2016, but never did. The last Focus Classic was assembled in September of that year. In 2019, the company was fined by the Chinese government for anti-trust practices. It was ordered to pay $23.5 million as penalty for having restricted prices since 2013. The amount constituted four percent of the company's annual sales in Chongqing.

== Leadership ==
- Marin Burela (2012–2016)
- Nigel Harris (2016–2019)
- Steven Armstrong (2019)
- He Xiaoqing (2019–2024)
- Ai Xiaoming (2024–present)

== Products ==
=== Current ===
- Ford Explorer
- Ford Escape
- Ford Mondeo
- Ford Edge
- Ford Mondeo Sport
- Lincoln Corsair
- Lincoln Aviator
- Lincoln Nautilus
- Lincoln Z
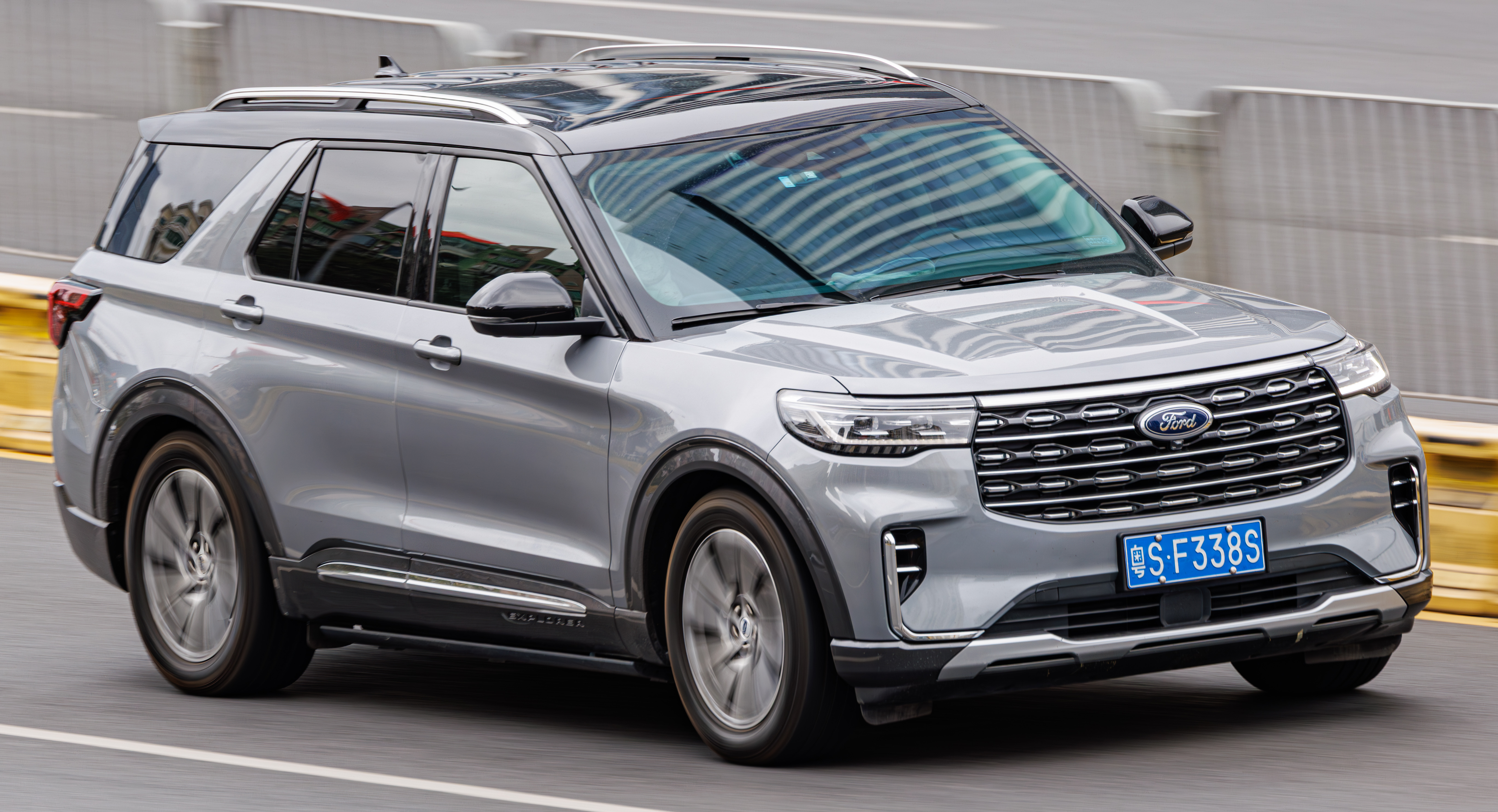
Ford Explorer

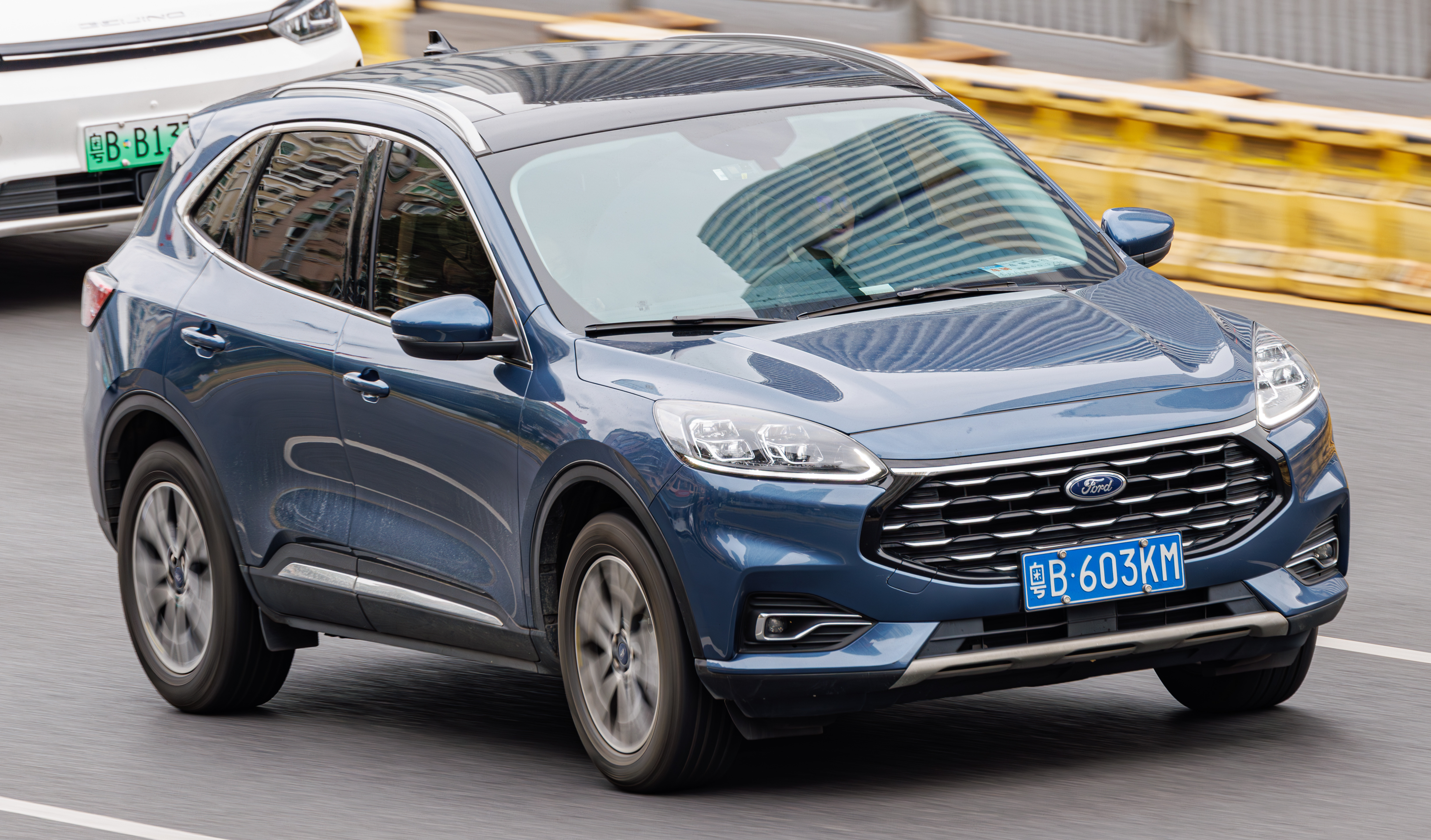
Ford Escape

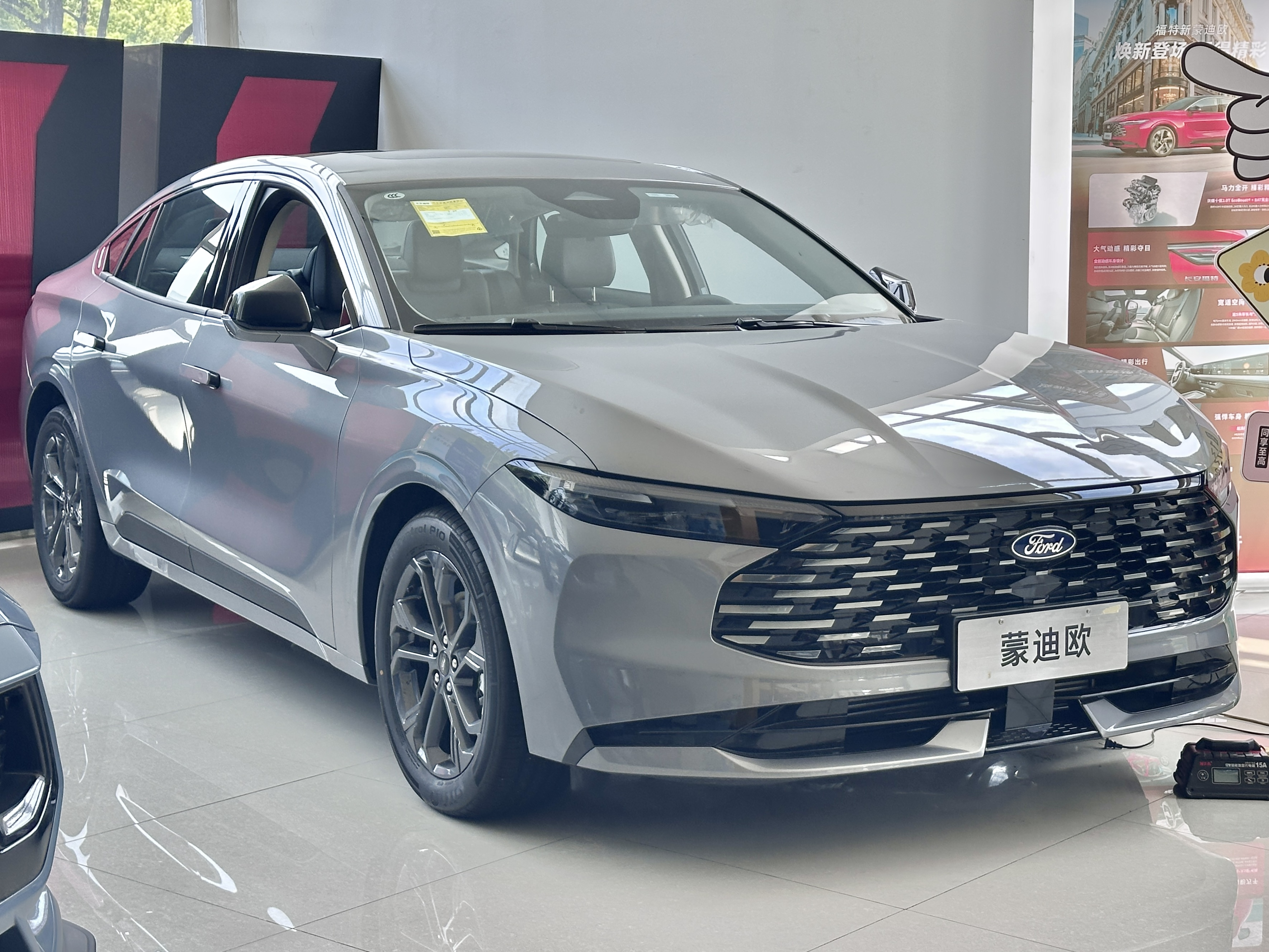
Ford Mondeo

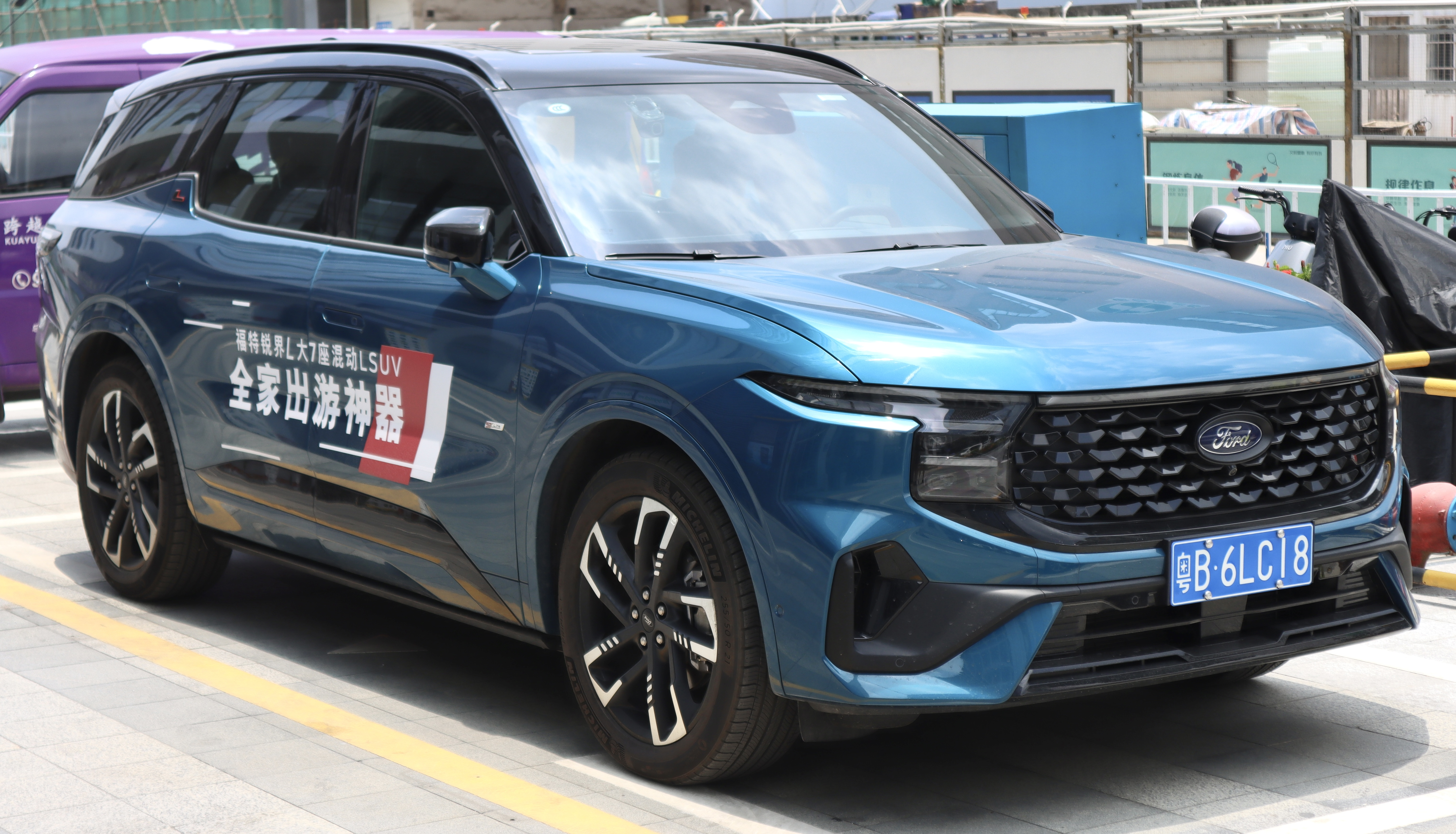
Ford Edge

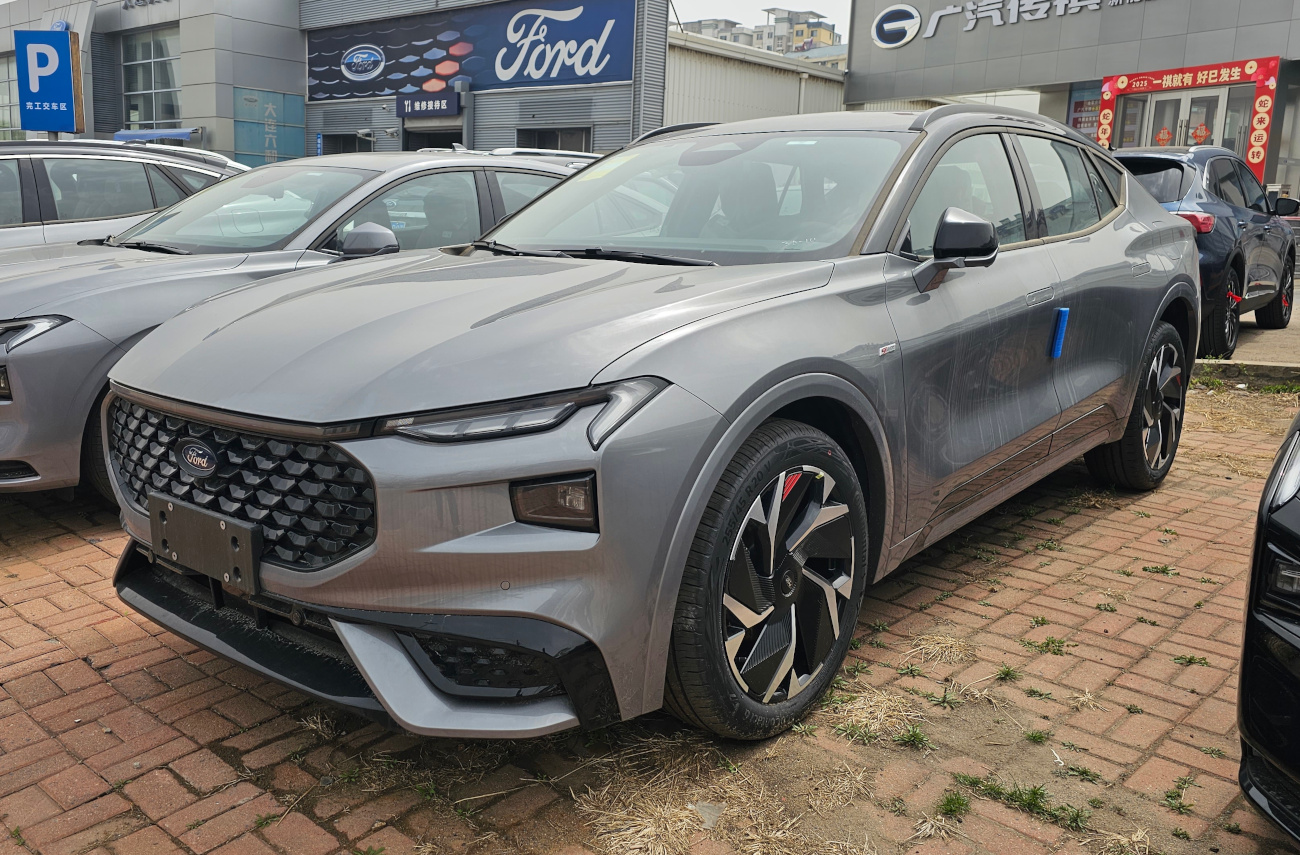
Ford Mondeo Sport

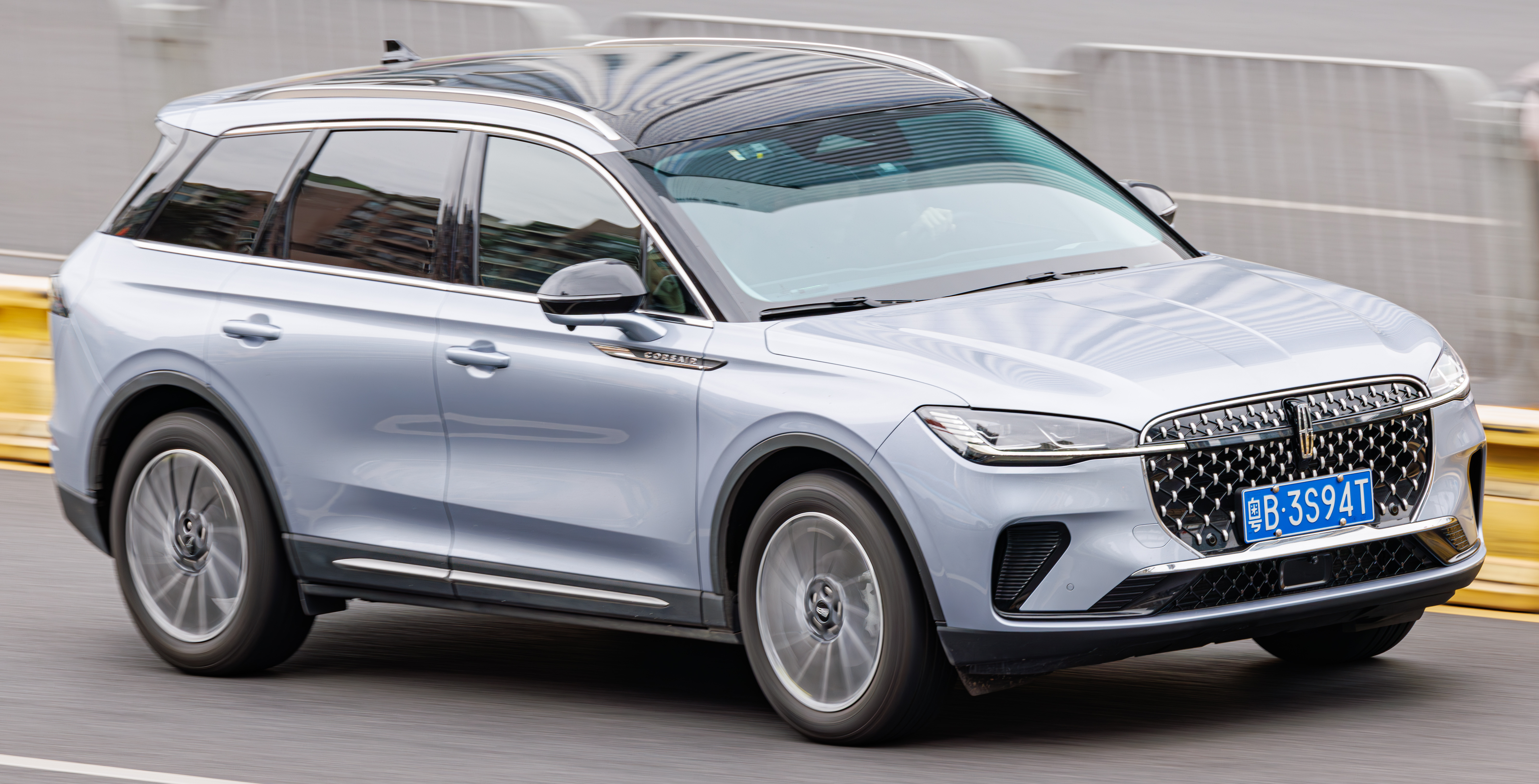
Lincoln Corsair

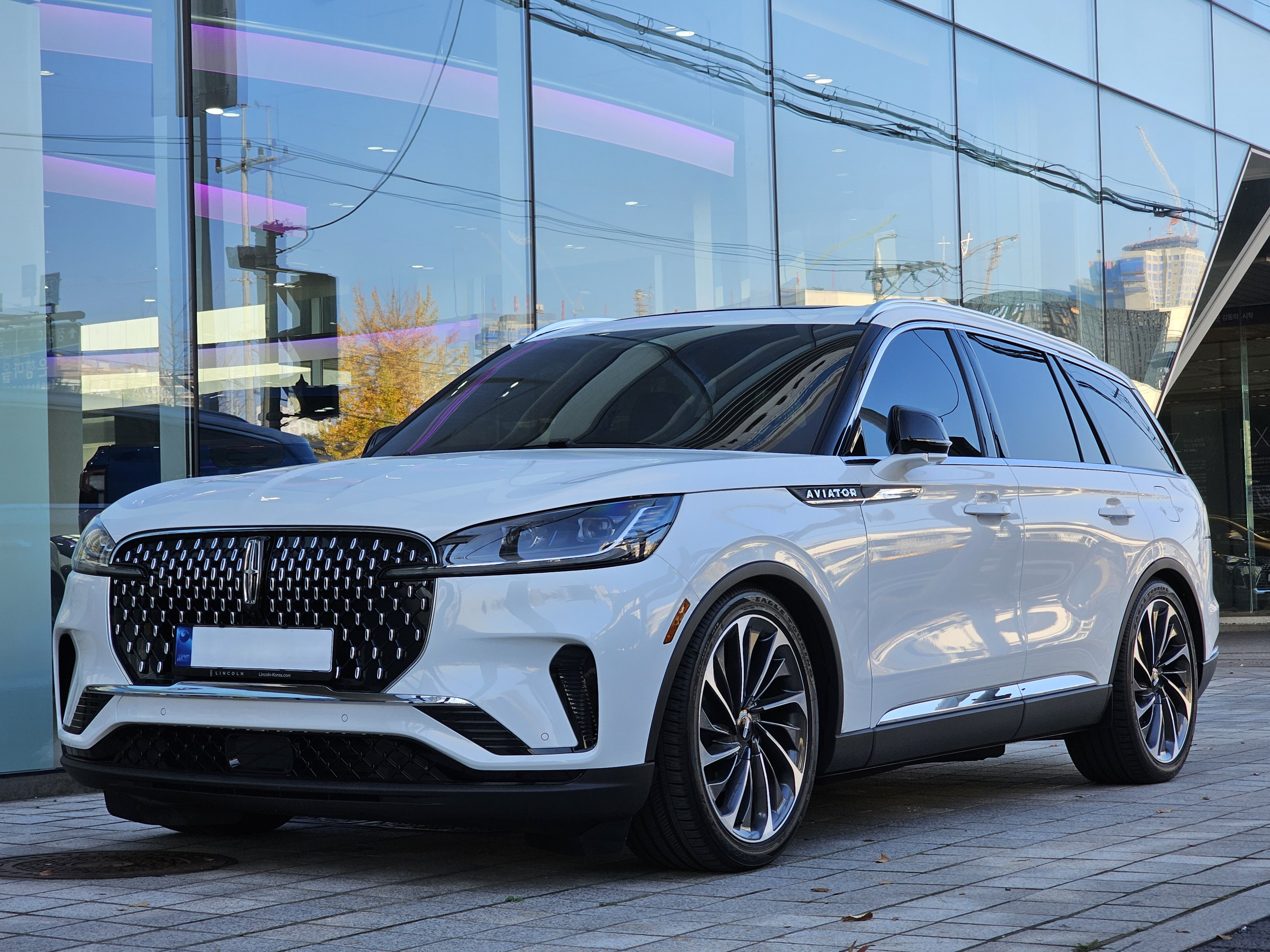
Lincoln Aviator

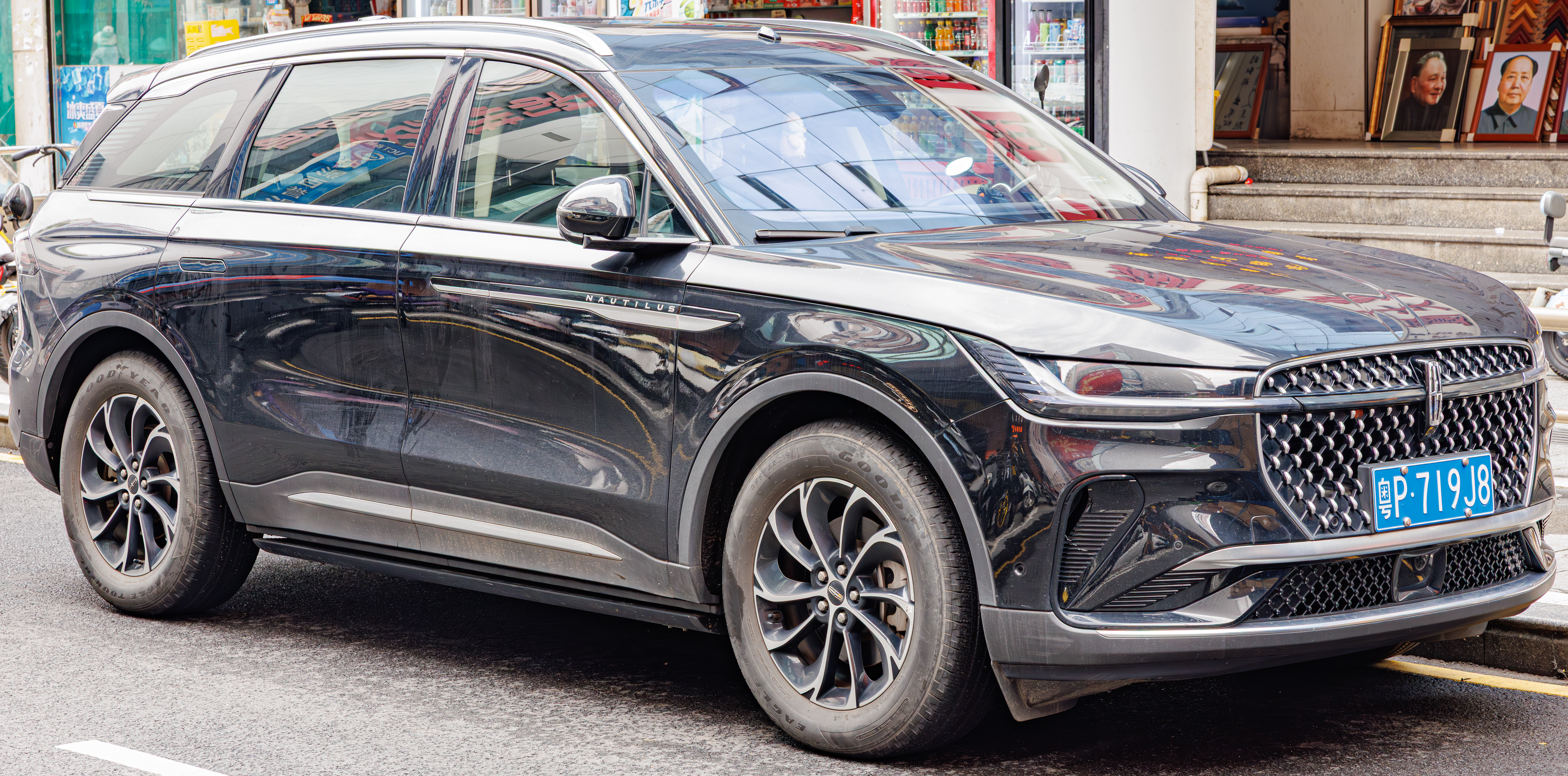
Lincoln Nautilus

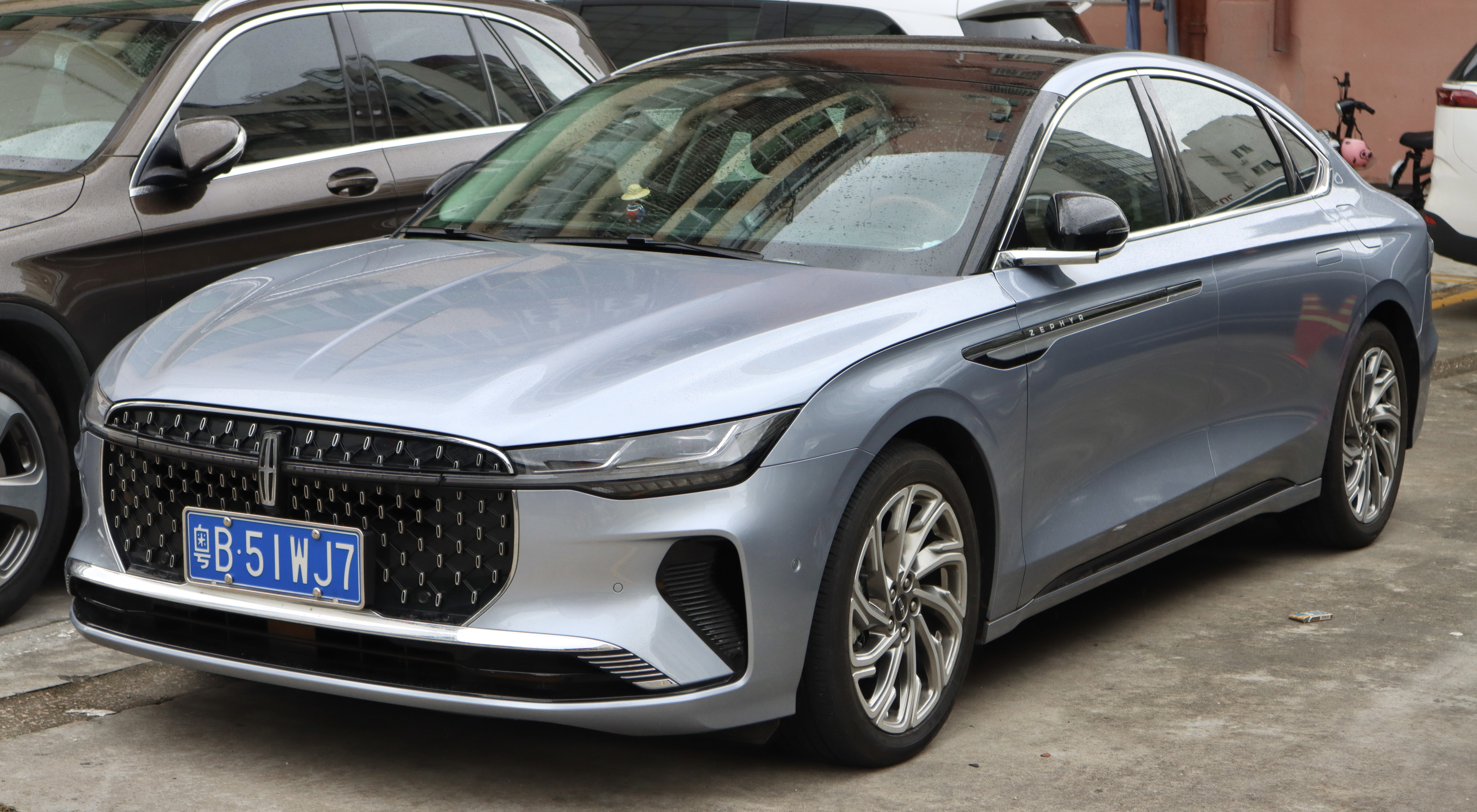
Lincoln Z

=== Former ===
- Ford Escort
- Ford Focus
- Ford Fiesta
- Ford Mustang Mach-E
- Ford Mondeo Zhisheng
- Ford S-Max
- Ford Kuga (replaced by the Ford Escape)
- Ford EcoSport
- Ford Taurus
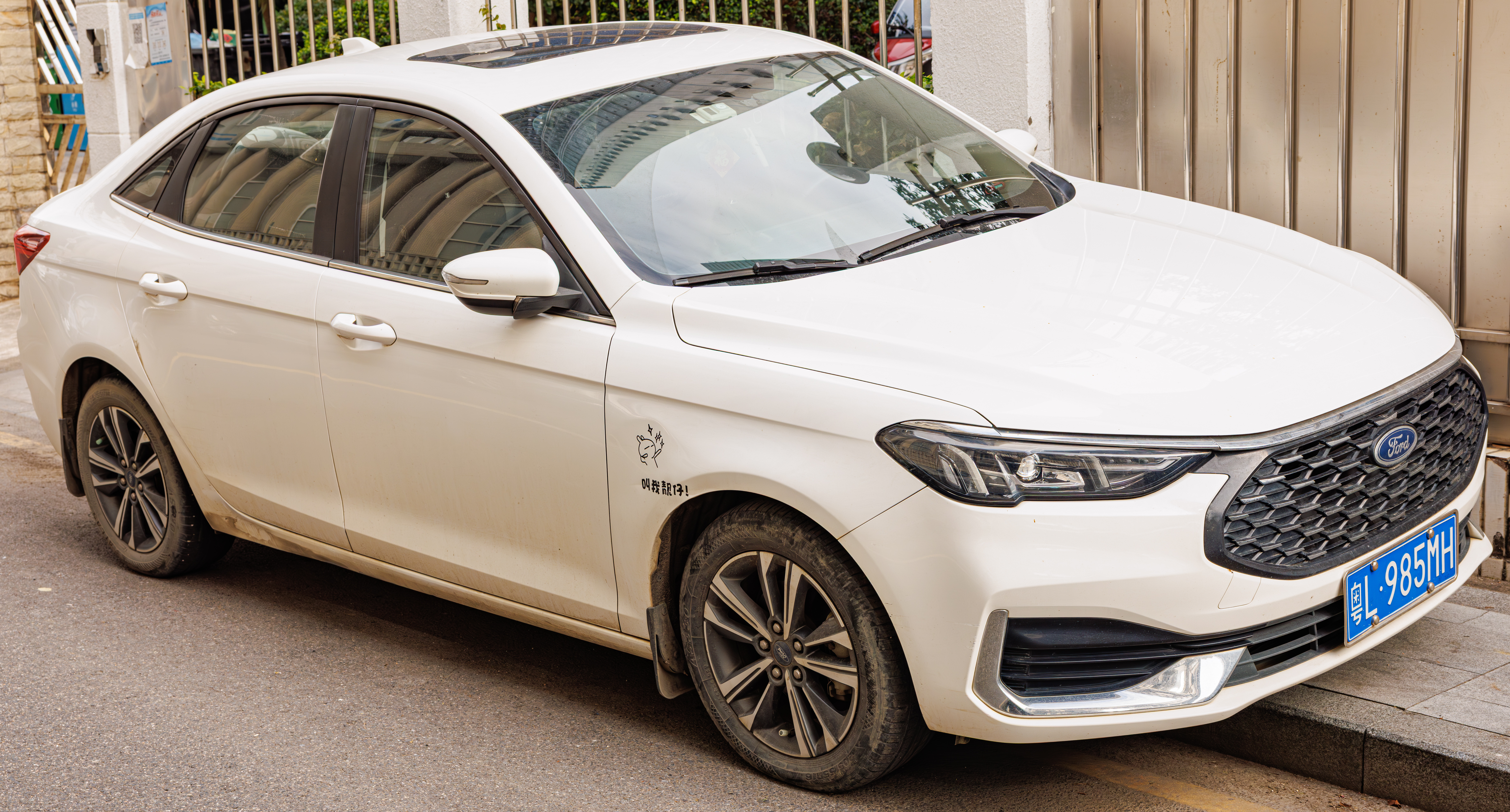
Ford Escort

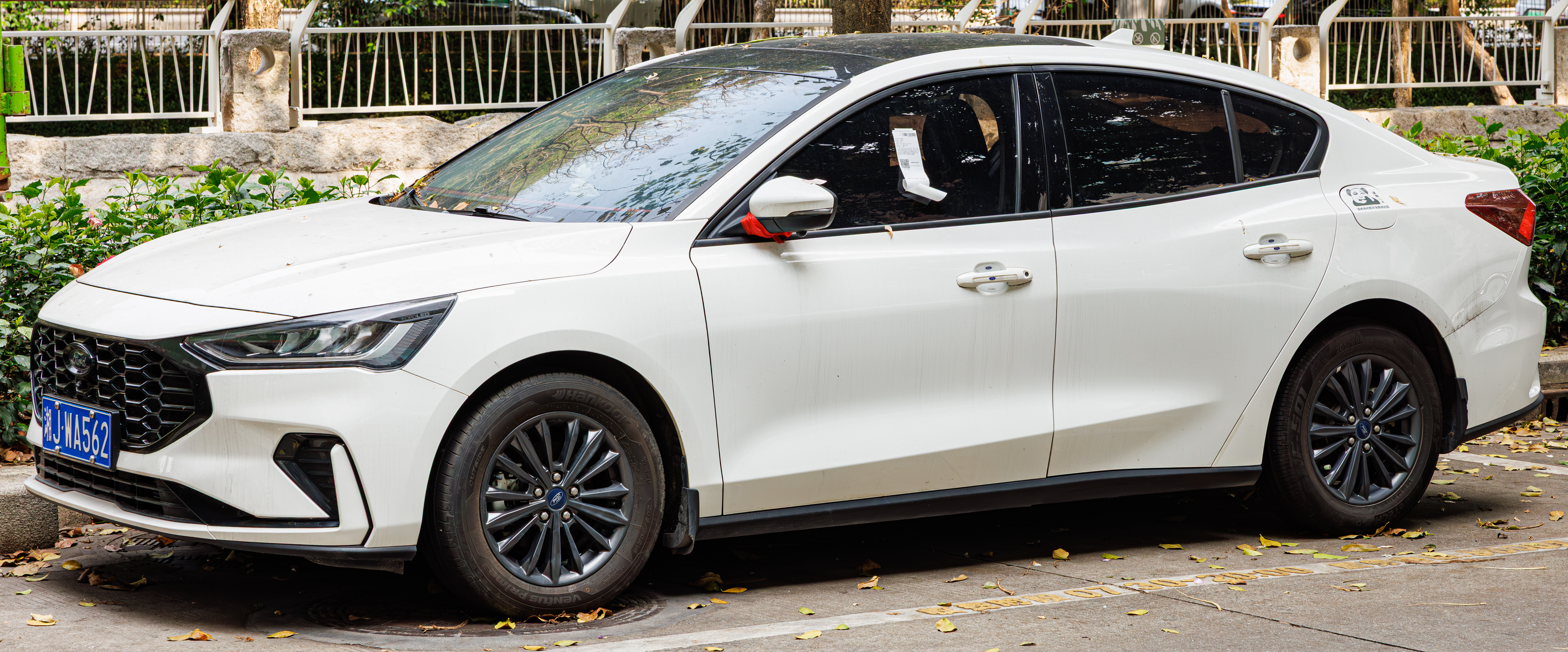
Ford Focus

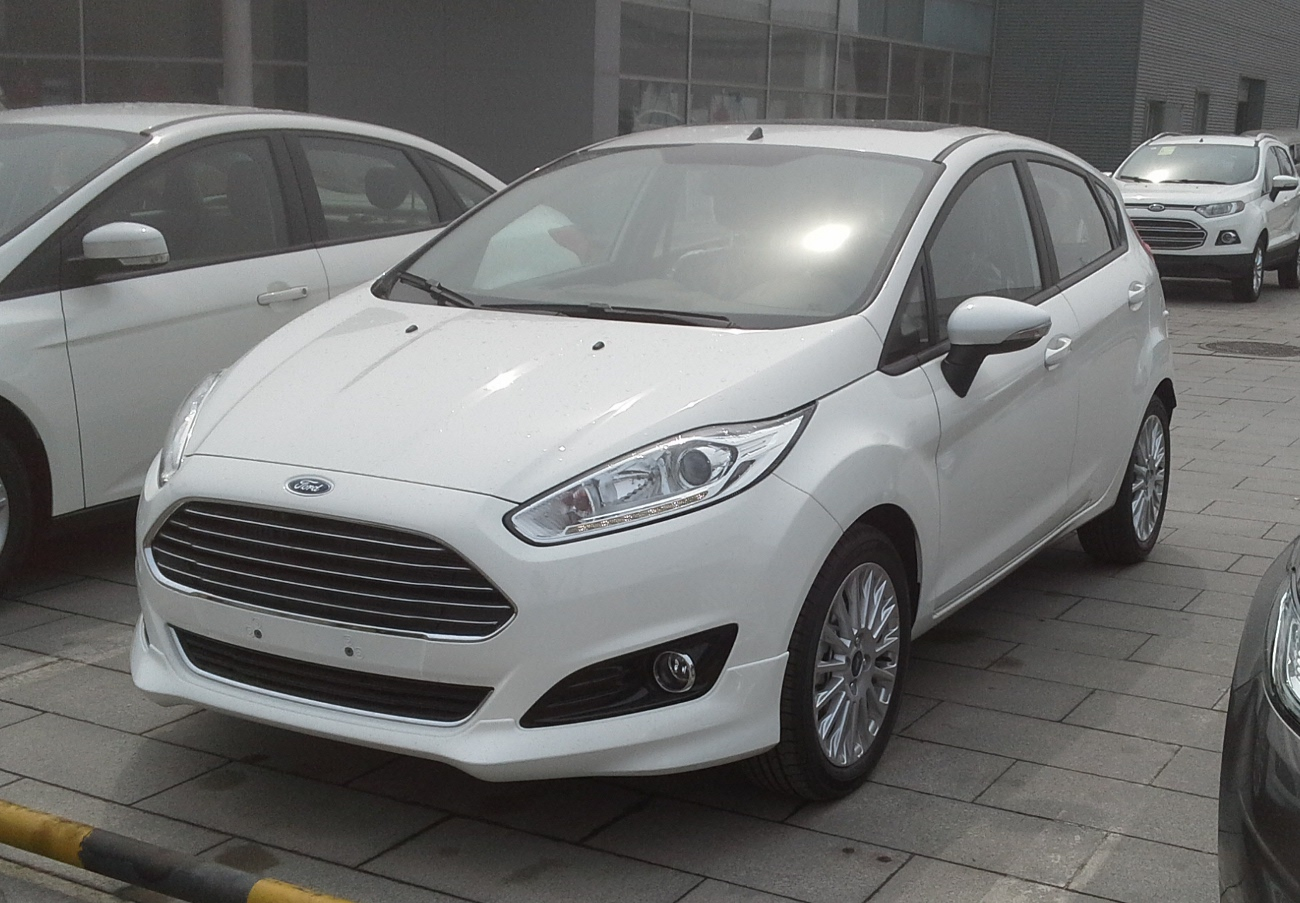
Ford Fiesta

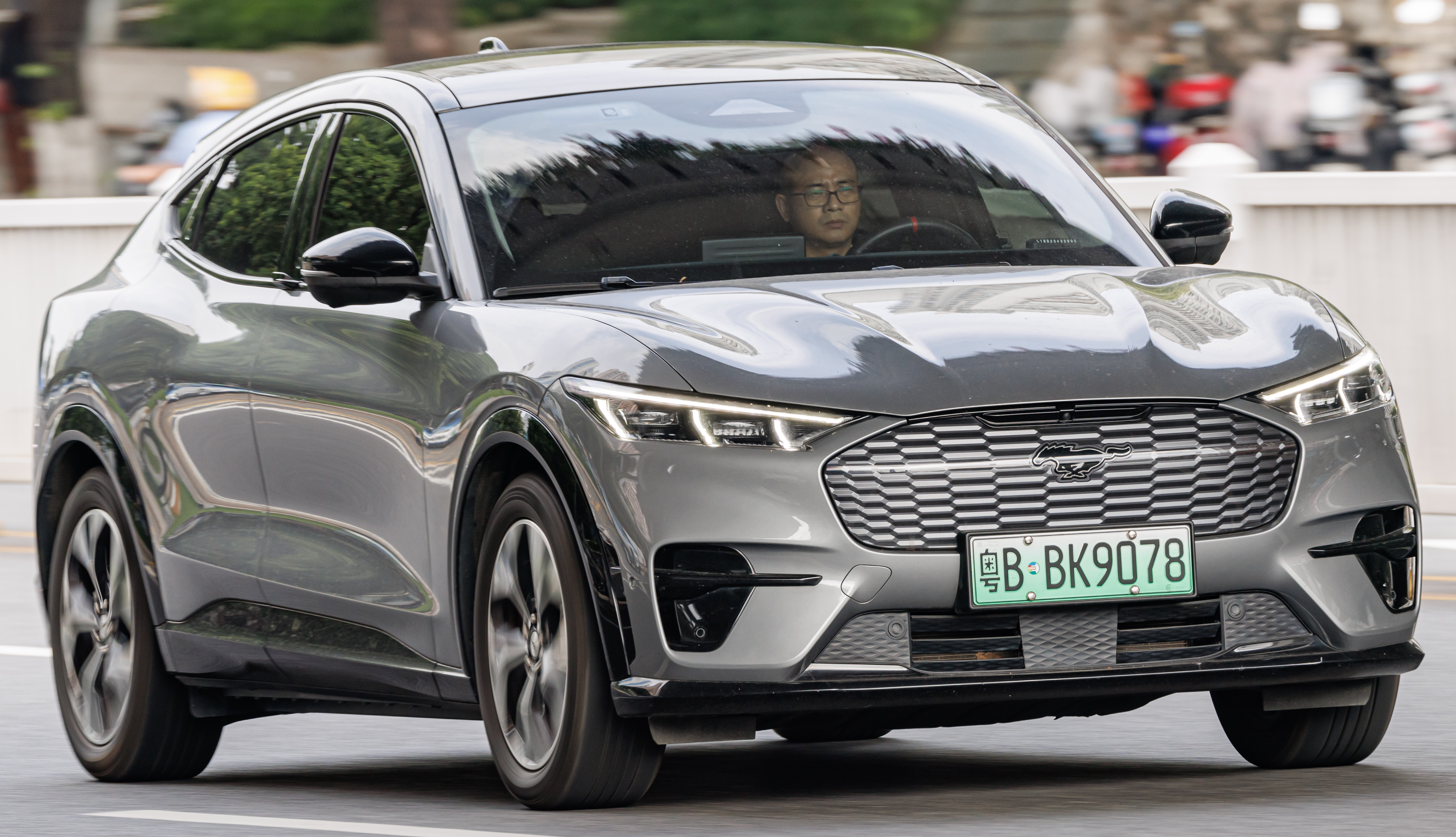
Ford Mustang MACH-E

Ford Mondeo Zhisheng

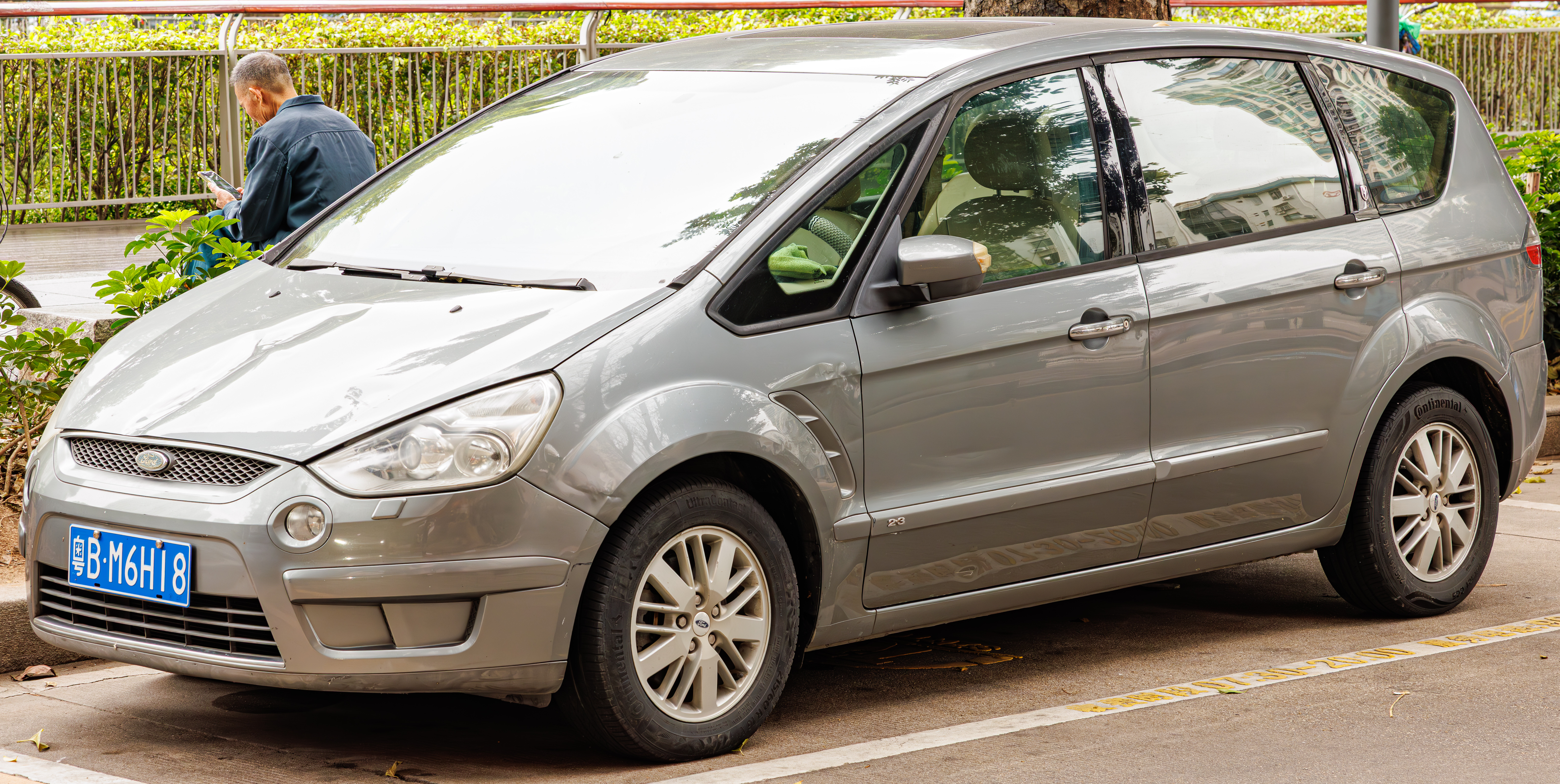
Ford S-MAX

Ford Kuga

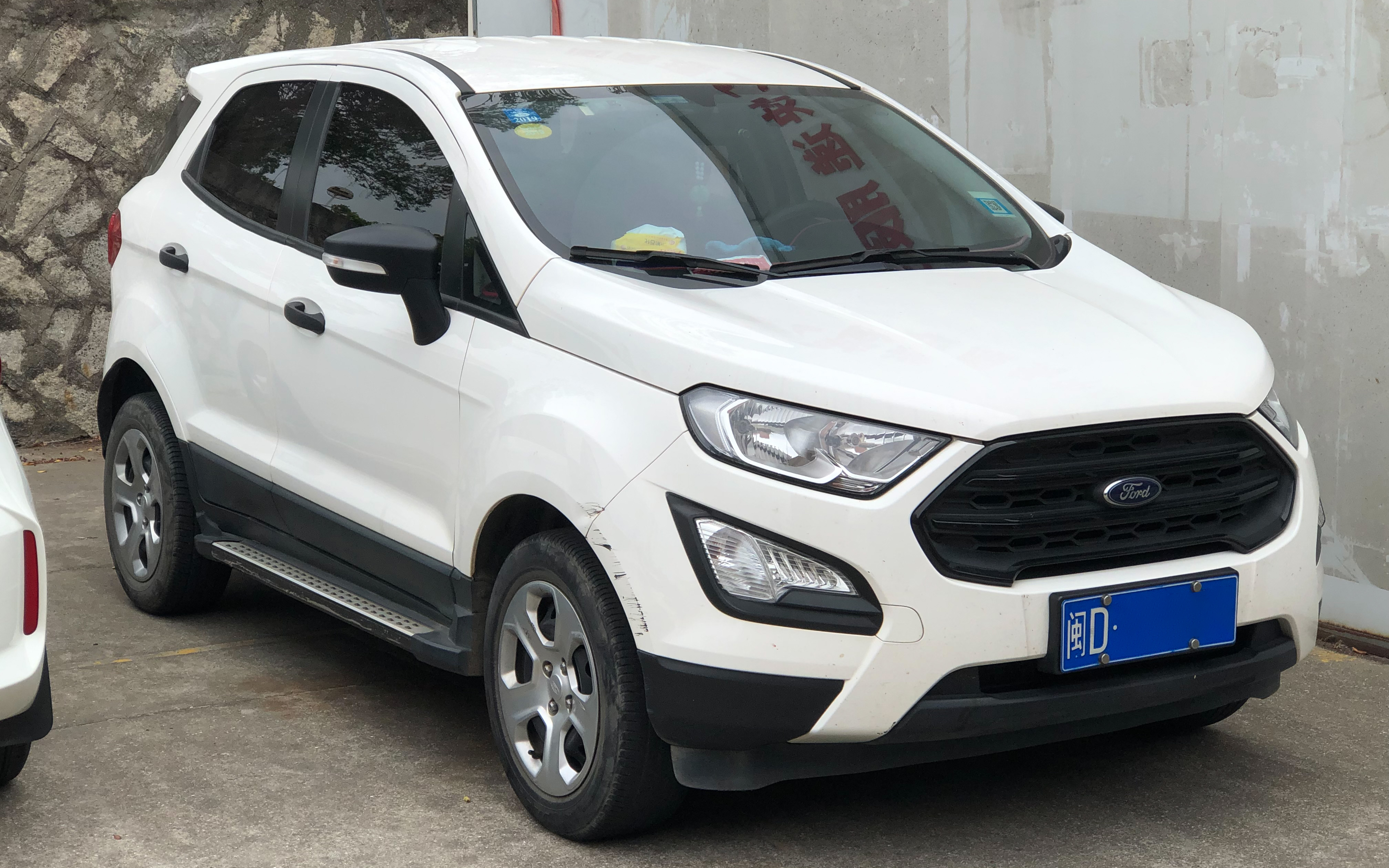
Ford EcoSport

Ford Taurus

== Sales ==
Calendar year	Total sales
2012	418,500
2013	678,950
2014	801,603
2015	836,425
2016	957,495
2017	826,740
2018	417,215
2019	183,987
2020	213,680
2021	304,682
2022	251,000
2023	233,122
