= Mazda CX-6e =

Mid-size crossover SUV

- Mazda EZ-60 EREV

Overview
- Manufacturer: Mazda (Changan Mazda)
- Model code: J90K
- Also called: Mazda EZ-60 (China)
- Production: August 2025 – present
- Assembly: China: Nanjing, Jiangsu (Changan Mazda)

Body and chassis
- Class: Mid-size crossover SUV (D)
- Body style: 5-door SUV
- Layout: Rear-motor, rear-wheel drive (EV); Front-engine, rear-motor, rear-wheel drive (EREV)
- Platform: Changan EPA1 platform
- Related: Deepal S07; Mazda EZ-6/6e

Powertrain
- Engine: Petrol range extender: 1.5 L JL473QJ I4
- Electric motor: AC induction, permanent magnet synchronous
- Power output: 190 kW (255 hp; 258 PS)
- Battery: 66.8 kWh NMC (EV); 77.9 kWh LFP (EV; Thailand & Australia); 79.97 kWh NMC (EV; Europe); 31.73 kWh LFP (EREV)
- Electric range: 520–620 km (320–390 mi) (EV); 160 km (99 mi) (EREV)

Dimensions
- Wheelbase: 2,902 mm (114.3 in)
- Length: 4,850 mm (190.9 in)
- Width: 1,935 mm (76.2 in)
- Height: 1,620 mm (63.8 in)
- Curb weight: 1,992–2,048 kg (4,392–4,515 lb) (EREV)

The Mazda CX-6e, known in China as the Mazda EZ-60 is a mid-size crossover SUV produced by Mazda. It was introduced in April 2025, and went on sale in September 2025 in China. A product developed and produced by Changan Mazda joint venture, the model is heavily based on the Deepal S07 and shares the same battery electric and extended-range EV powertrains.

== Overview ==
The Mazda Arata Concept revealed at the 2024 Beijing Auto Show previewed the EZ-60.

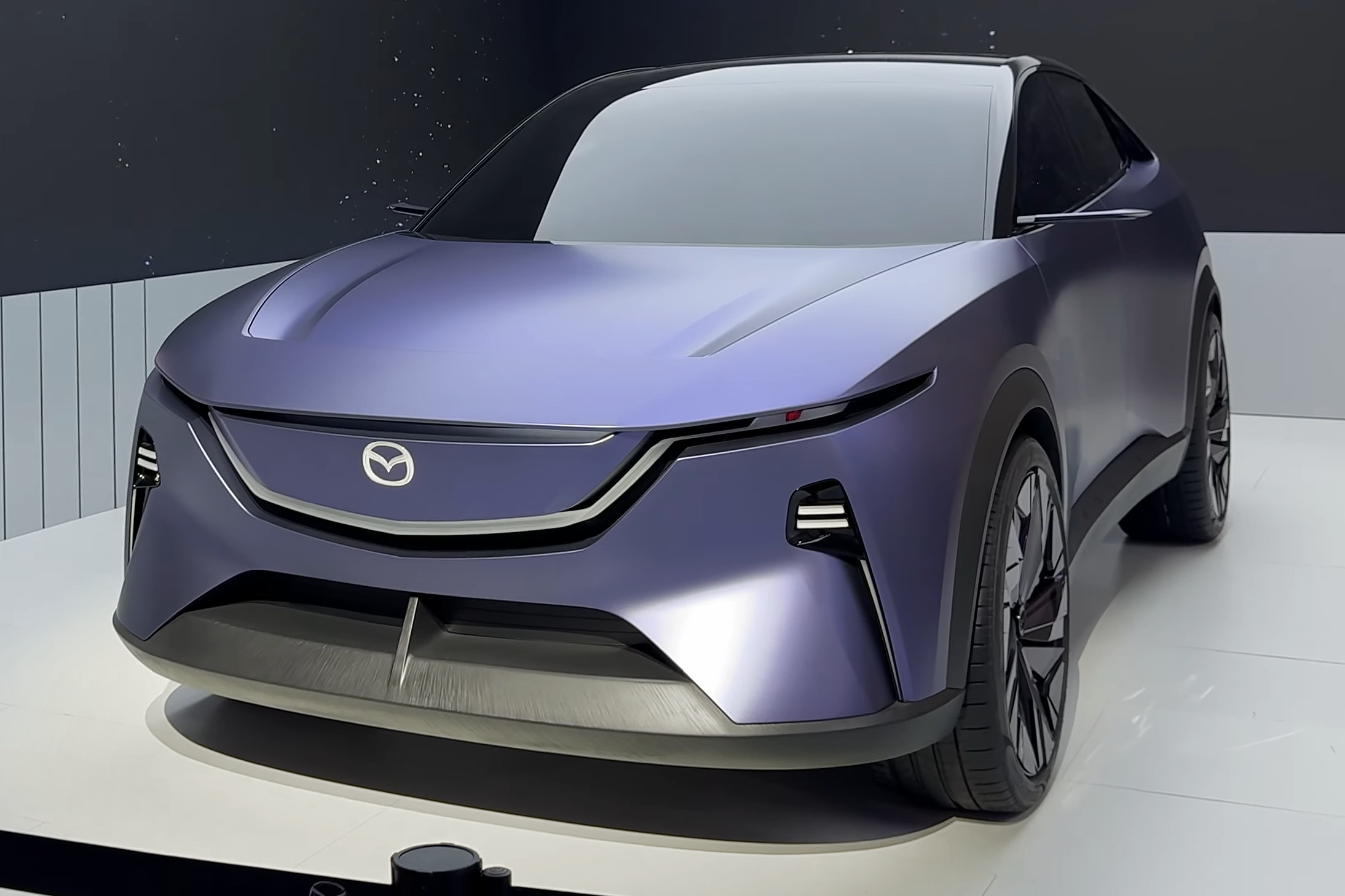
Mazda Arata Concept

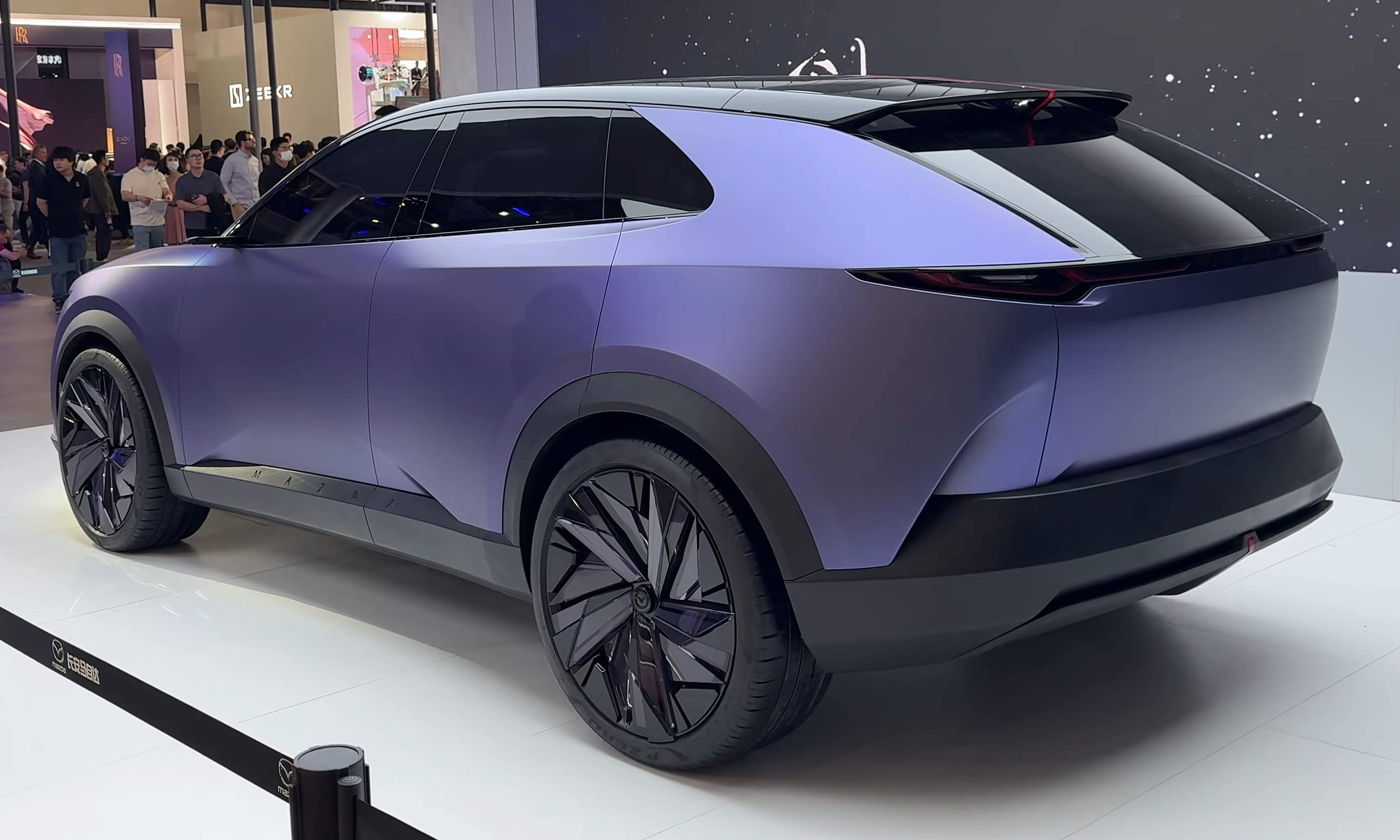
Rear view

The EZ-60 name was confirmed via a teaser posted onto Mazda's Weibo account on 31 March 2025. It was revealed at Auto Shanghai 2025 in April. The EZ-60 was officially launched in China on 26 September 2025.

The EZ-60 is one of two battery electric vehicles produced jointly by Mazda and Changan, with the other model being the EZ-6. The model uses the EPA1 platform which is also used by the EZ-6.

The exterior follows Mazda's Kodo design language features a body color painted grille, a contrasting black-painted roof, and optional digital side mirrors. It features 9 air vents, including air curtains and slotted D-pillars, which Mazda claims reduces drag by 60.8 counts allowing for 41 km (25 mi) of additional range and generates 705 N (71.9 kgf; 158 lbf) of downforce at highway speeds.

The dashboard features a 5K-resolution 26.45-inch wide display that serves as both the infotainment screen and passenger entertainment display, and has few physical controls. It has a 100-inch 3D AR-HUD and an optional 23-speaker 7.1.4 Dolby Atmos surround sound system. The optional digital side view mirrors are shown on door-mounted displays flanking the dashboard.

The rear cargo area measures 350 litres (12.4 cu ft), which expands to 2,036 litres (71.9 cu ft) when the rear seats are folded down, and supplemented by a 126-litre (4.4 cu ft) frunk exclusive to EV models.

The chassis consists of seven horizontal and five vertical beams, 86.5% of which is composed of high-strength steel, including 2,000 MPa hot-stamped steel crash structure and 1,470 MPa cold-rolled steel used in the roof. It is equipped with nine airbags as standard, and the battery pack meets China's updated 2026 crash safety requirements.

The EZ-60 has an ADAS sensor suite consisting of five mmWave radars, five high-definition cameras, and 12 ultrasonic sensors, enabling standard L2 assisted driving features including automatic emergency braking from up to 80 km/h (50 mph).

Rear view

Interior

== Powertrain ==
The EZ-60 uses the same powertrain as the Deepal S07, which has the option to use a 175 kW (235 hp; 238 PS) electric motor for the EV. The range extender models pair a 1.5-liter JL473QJ engine serving as a generator with a 190 kW (255 hp; 258 PS) motor with power supplied by a 31.73 kWh LFP battery pack. The electric motor is placed at the rear for both EV and EREV models.

== Markets ==
=== Australia ===
The CX-6e went on sale in Australia on 11 April 2026, with customer deliveries commenced in September 2026. It is available with two variants: GT and Azami, both variants are powered by the 77.9 kWh battery pack.

=== China ===
In China, the EZ-60 is available with three battery electric and three range extended variants, each named Base, Pro, and Max, regardless of powertrain.

=== Europe ===
The vehicle was introduced in Europe at the Brussels Motor Show on 9 January 2026, as the Mazda CX-6e.

=== Thailand ===
The CX-6e was launched in Thailand on 7 October 2026, with two variants: Premium and Premium Sports, both variants are powered by the 77.9 kWh battery pack.

== Sales ==
After opening at Auto Shanghai on 23 April, the EZ-60 received 10,060 fully refundable pre-orders in 48 hours, surpassed 20,000 pre-orders on 16 May, and surpassed 30,000 pre-orders on 24 June.

Year	China		
Year	EV	EREV	Total
2025	2,623	5,198	7,821
