= Changan Mazda =

Chinese automaker

Changan Mazda Automobile Co., Ltd.
- Native name: 长安马自达
- Type: Joint venture
- Industry: Automotive
- Predecessor: Changan Ford Mazda
- Founded: December 2012; 13 years ago
- Headquarters: Nanjing, China
- Area served: China
- Products: Automobiles
- Owner: Changan Automobile (50%); Mazda (50%)
- Website: www.changan-mazda.com.cn

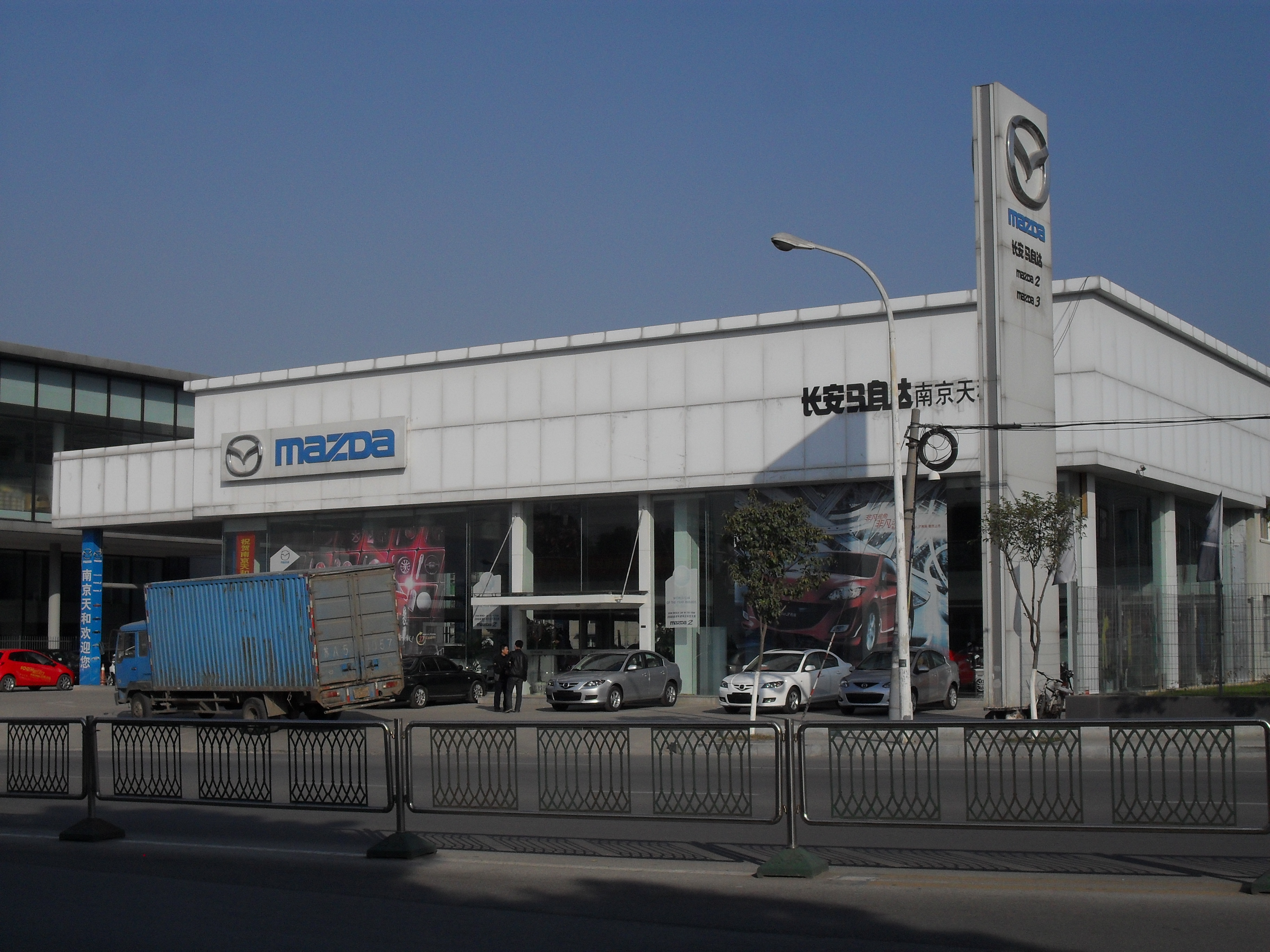
Dealership in China

Changan Mazda (officially Changan Mazda Automobile Co., Ltd.) is an automotive manufacturing company headquartered in Nanjing, China, and a 50:50 joint venture between Changan Automobile and Mazda. The company's principal activity is the manufacture of Mazda brand passenger cars for the Chinese market. The company was formed in December 2012 after the decision to restructure Changan Ford Mazda, whereby Ford and Mazda agreed to work with Changan as separate joint ventures.

In July 2023, Changan Mazda purchased 100% of FAW Group's joint venture FAW Mazda after having owned a majority stake two years earlier.

== Model lineup ==
=== Present vehicles ===
- Mazda3
- Mazda CX-5
- Mazda CX-30
- Mazda CX-50
- Mazda EZ-6
- Mazda EZ-60

=== Former vehicles ===
- Mazda CX-4
- Mazda CX-8

== Gallery ==
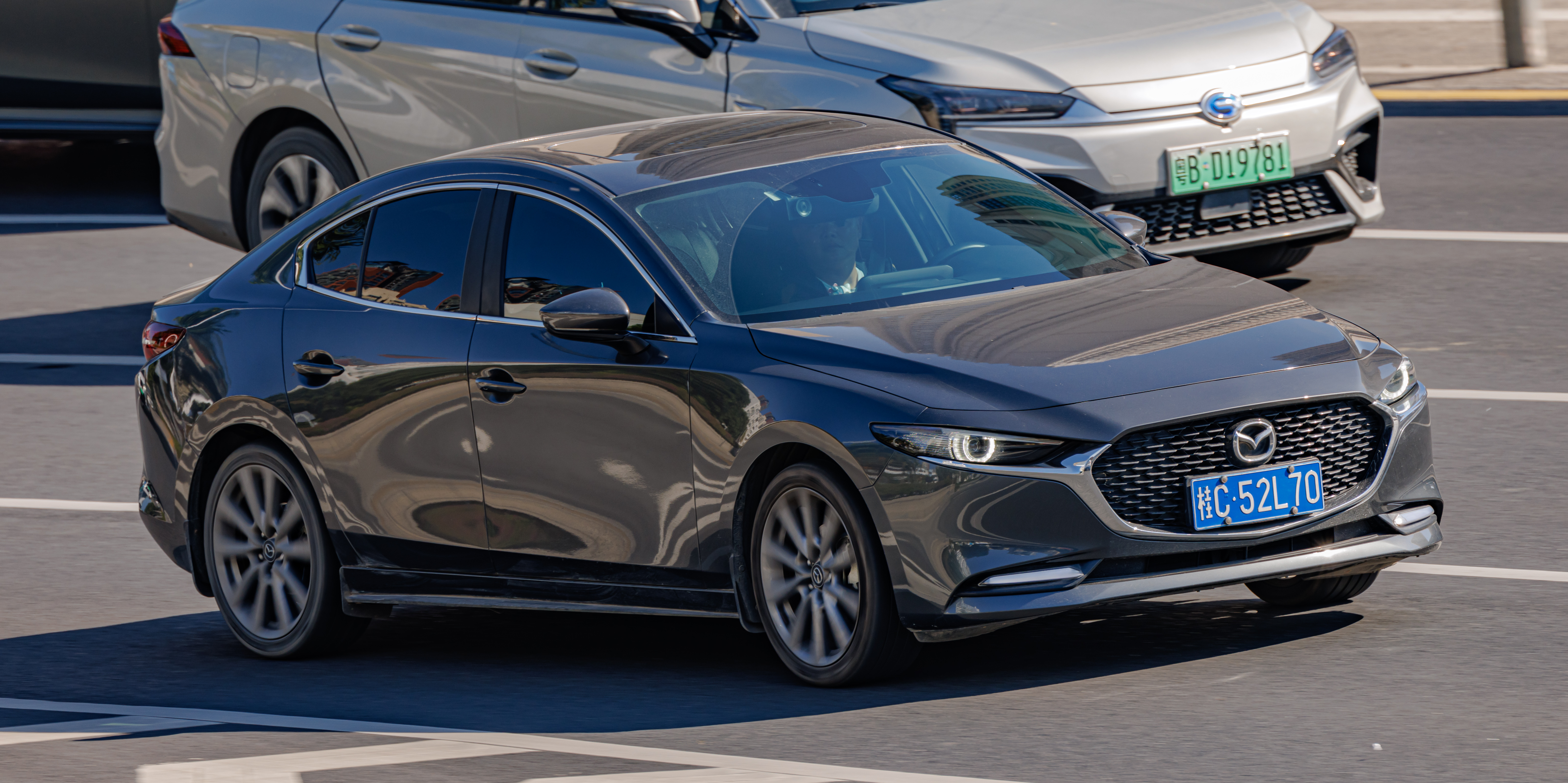
Mazda 3 Axela

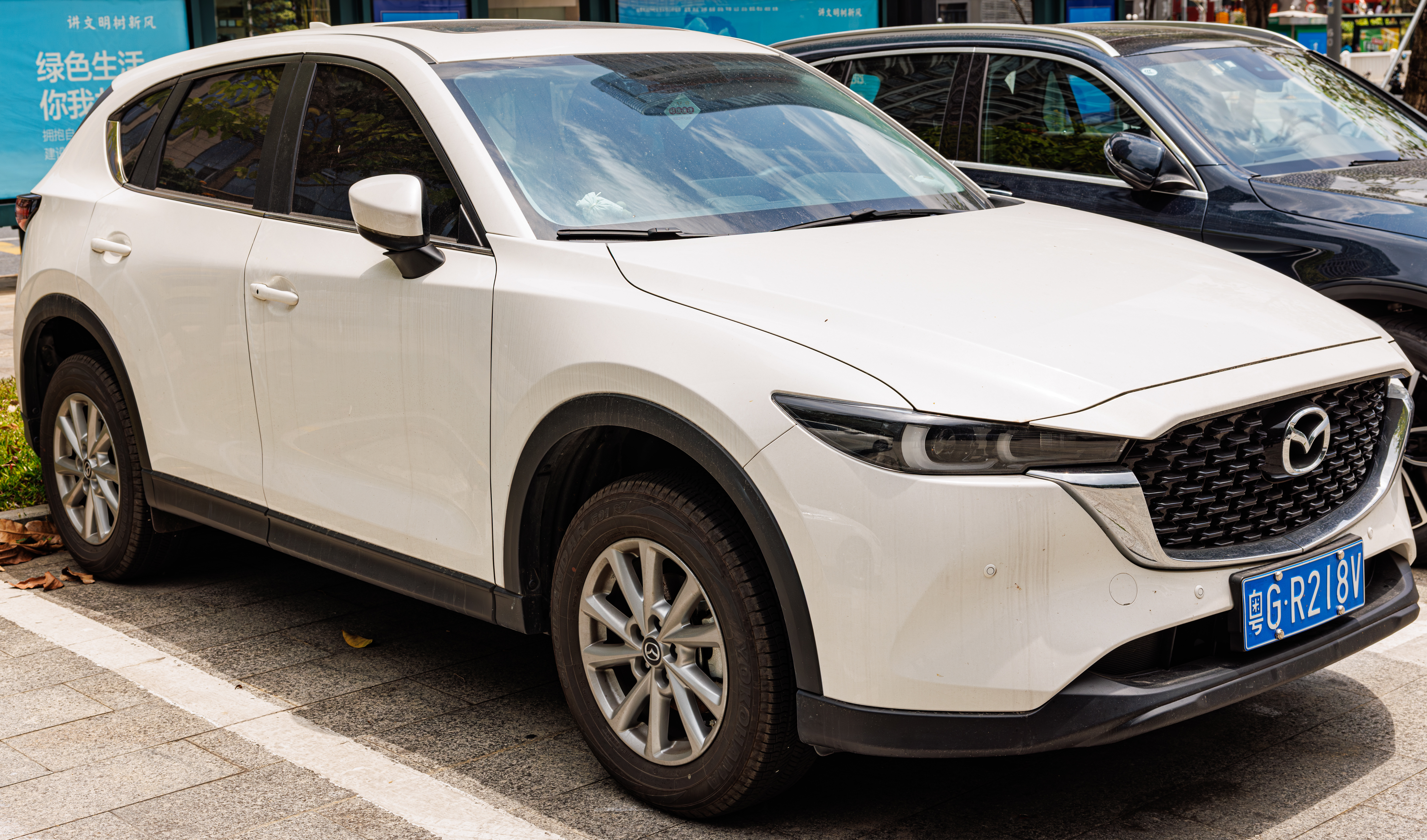
Mazda CX-5

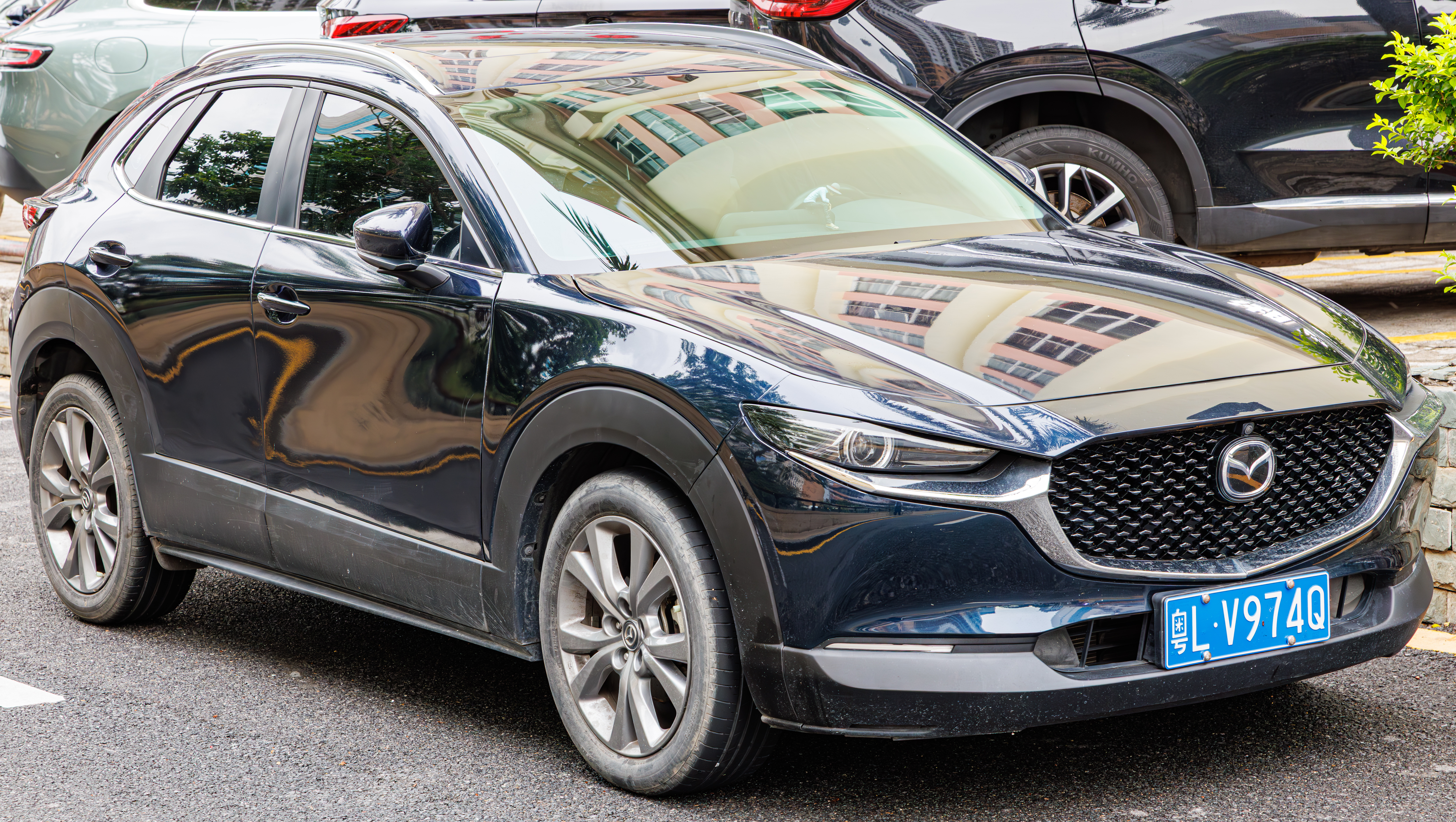
Mazda CX-30

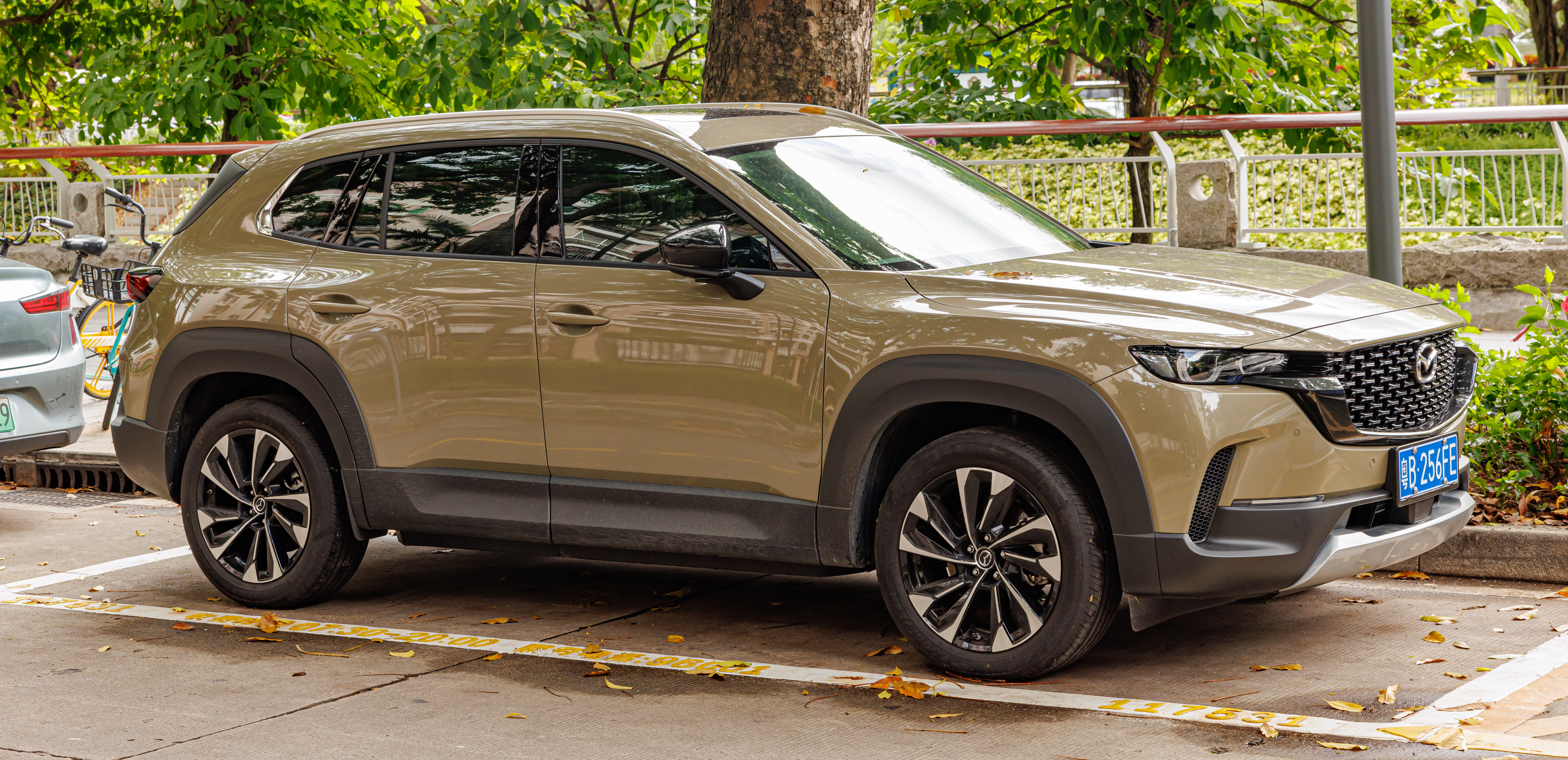
Mazda CX-50

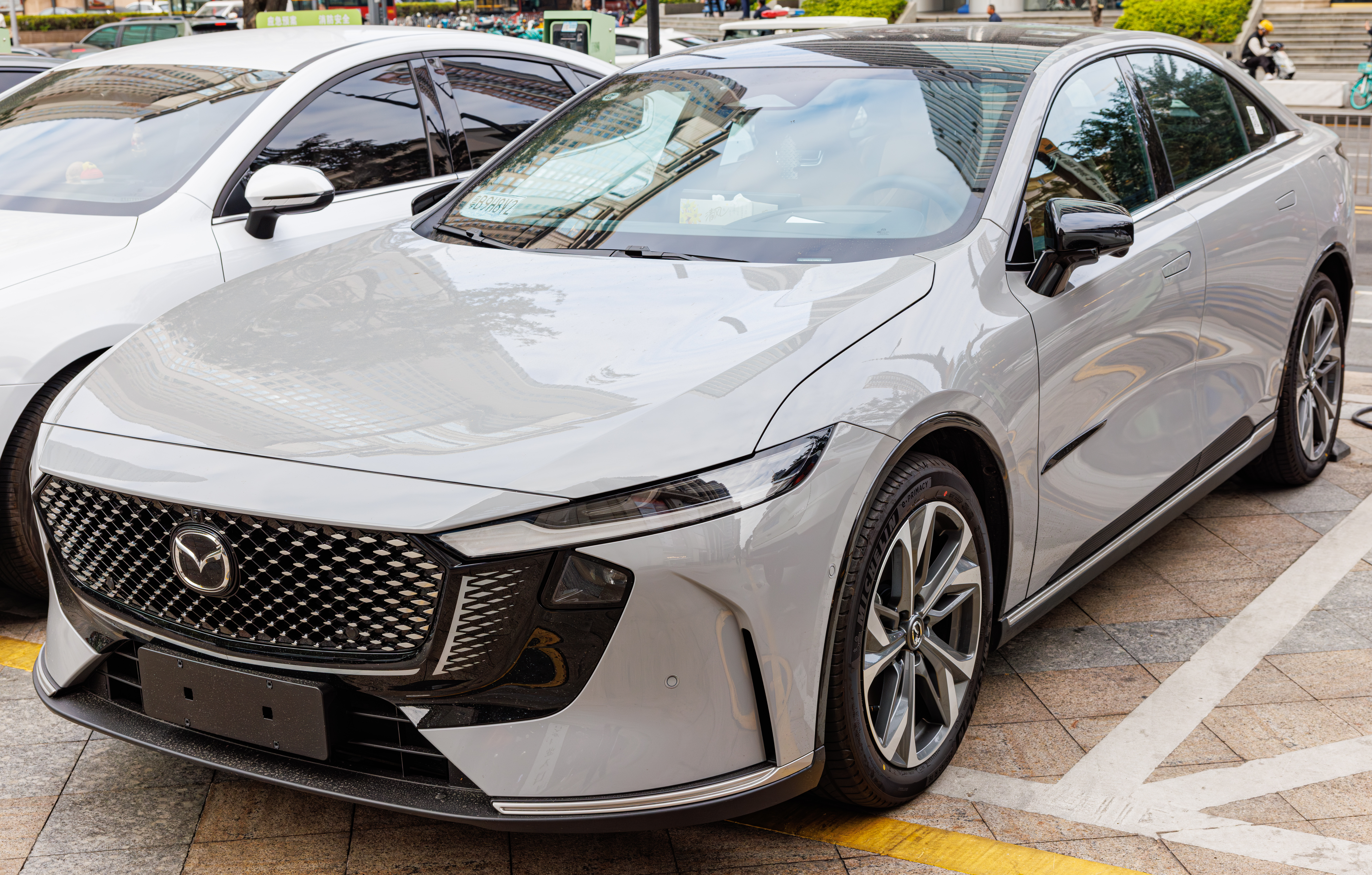
Mazda EZ-6

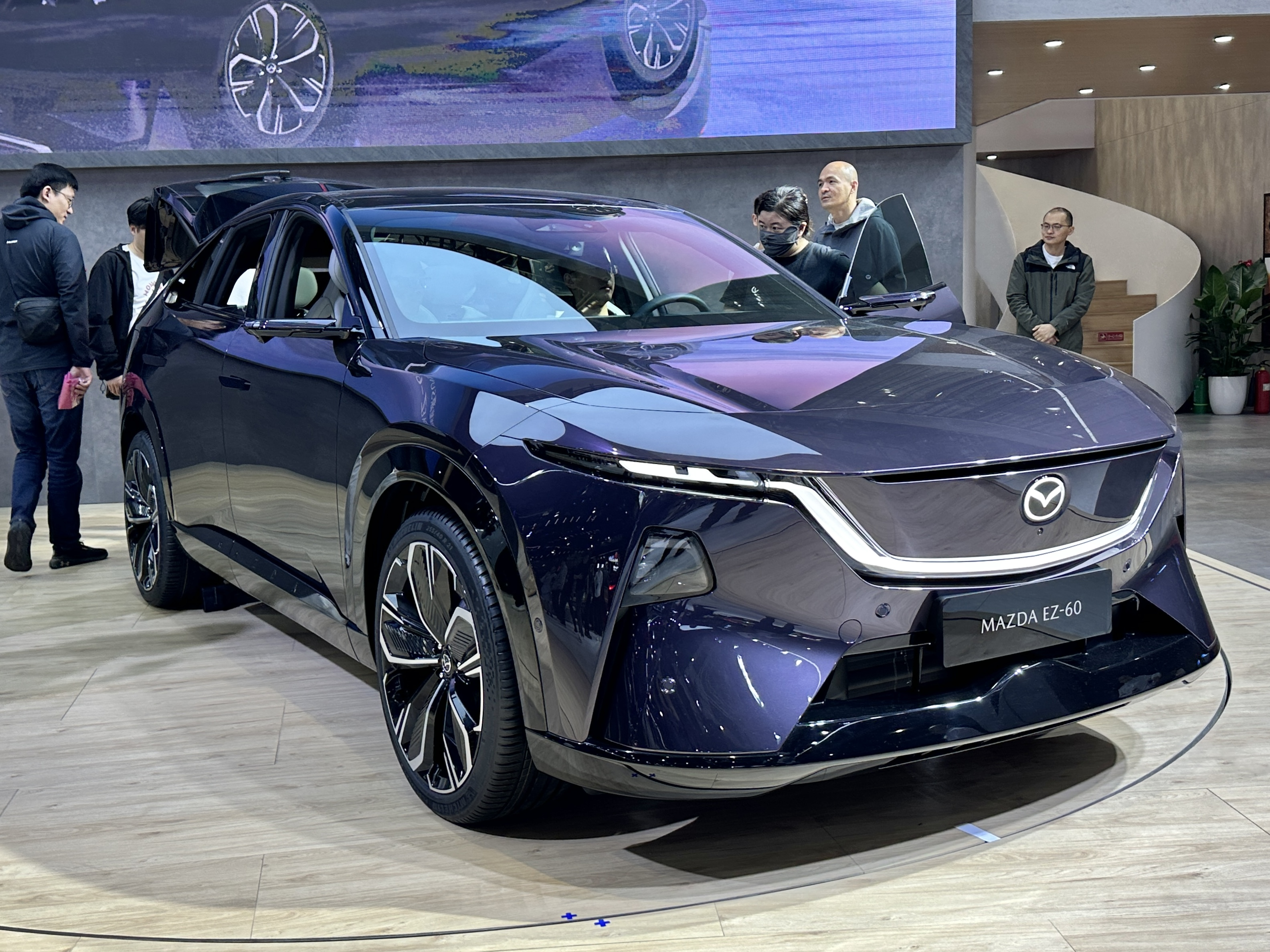
Mazda EZ-60

=== Former ===
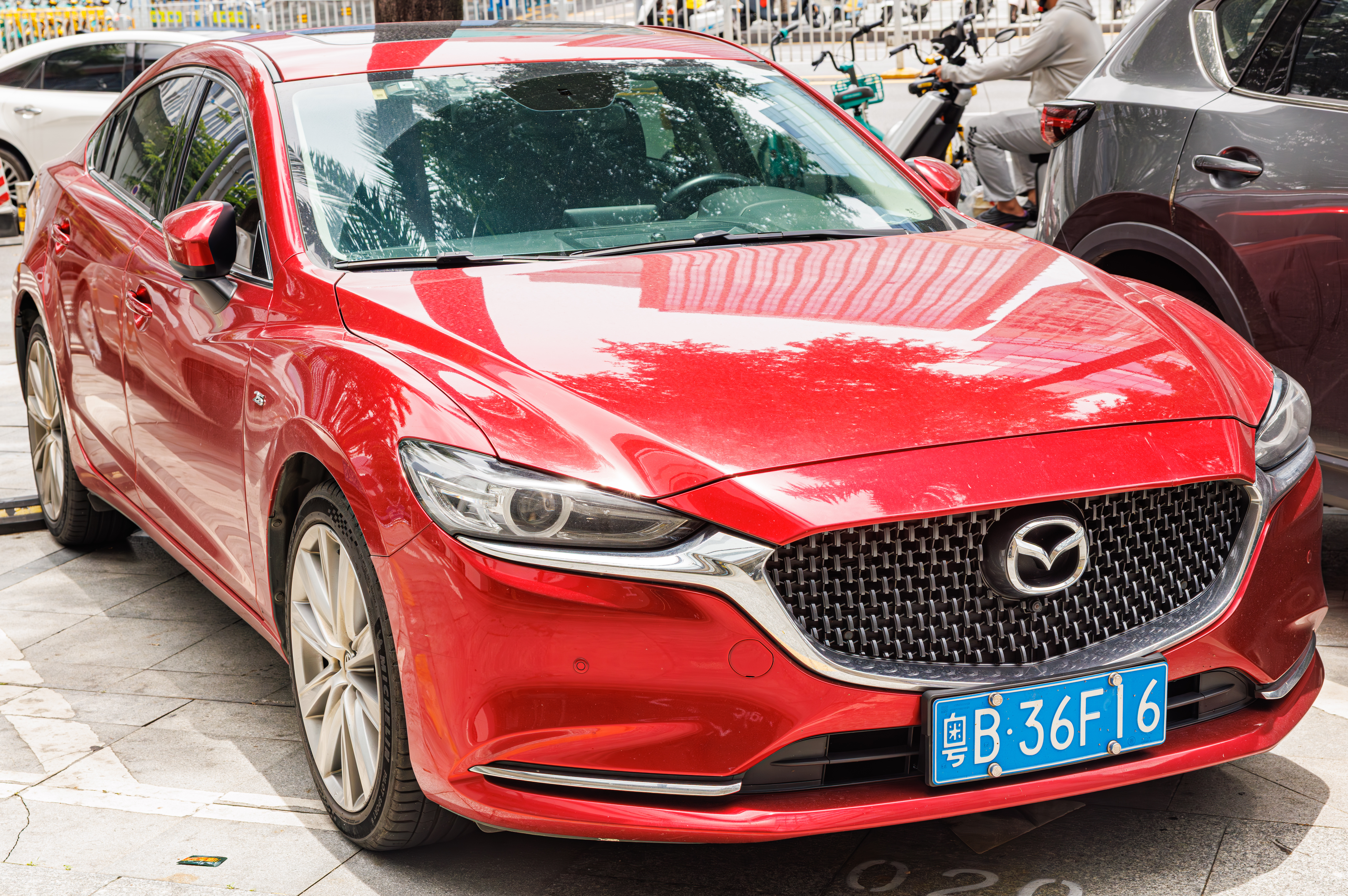
Mazda 6

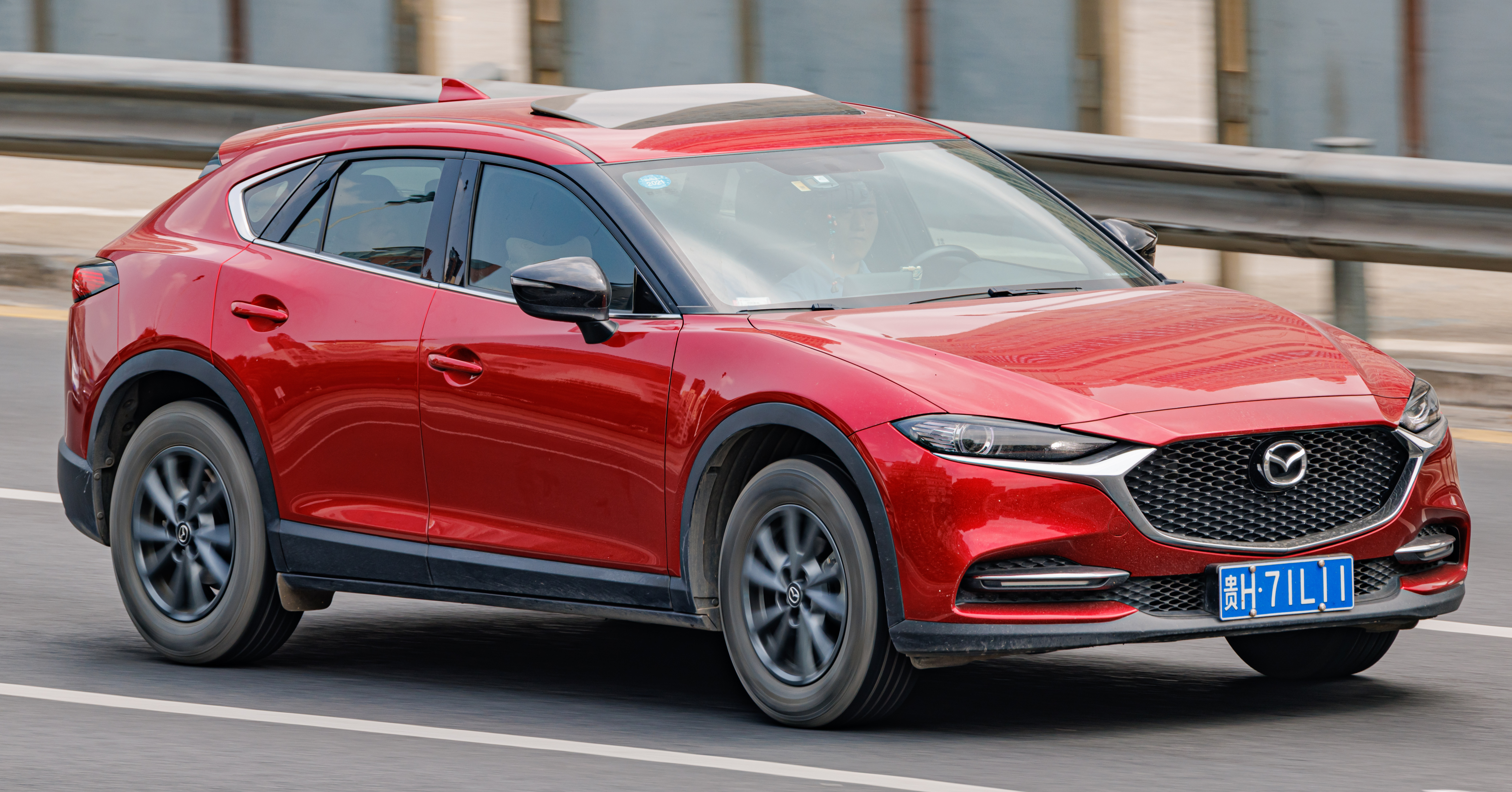
Mazda CX-4

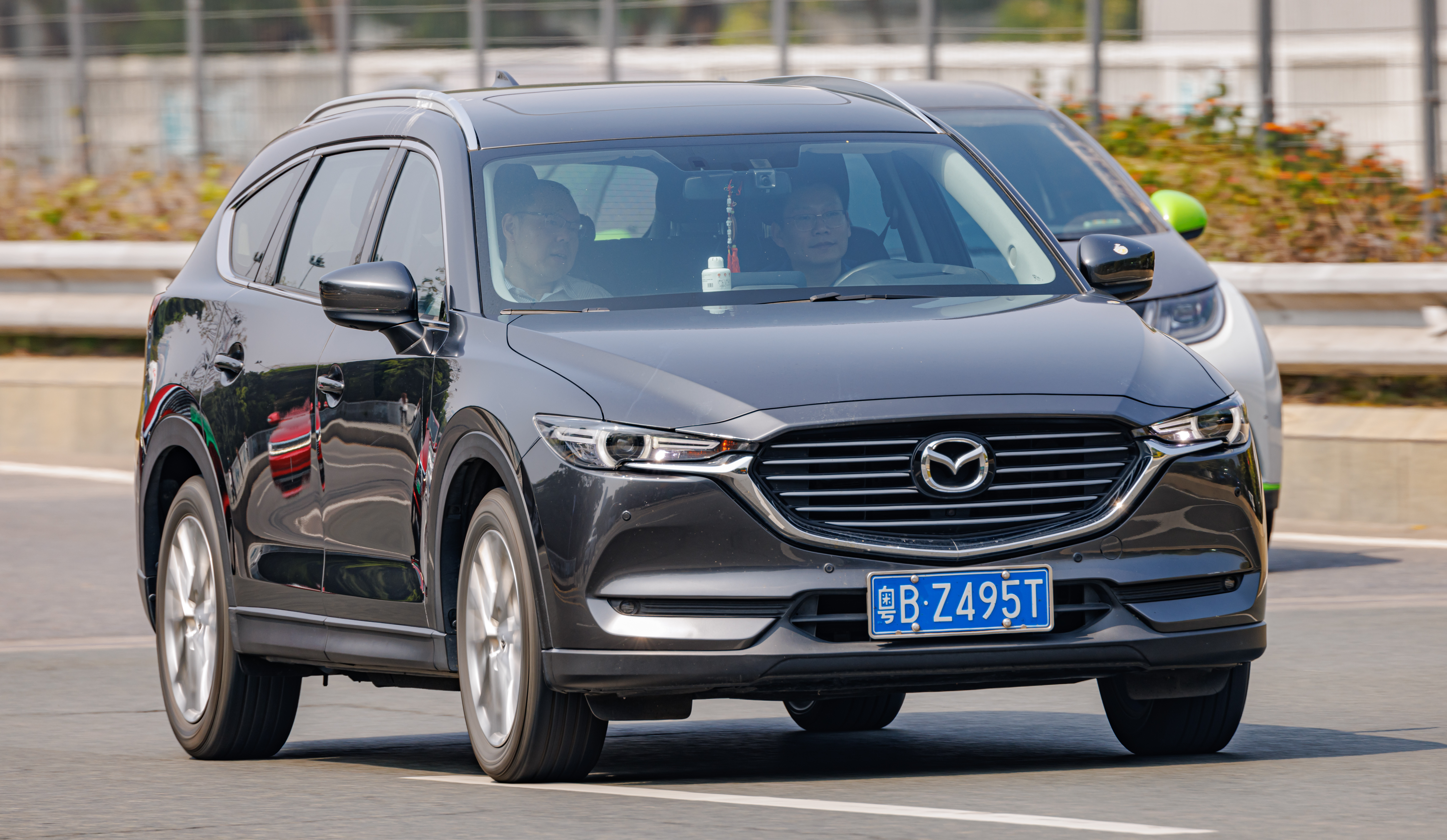
Mazda CX-8

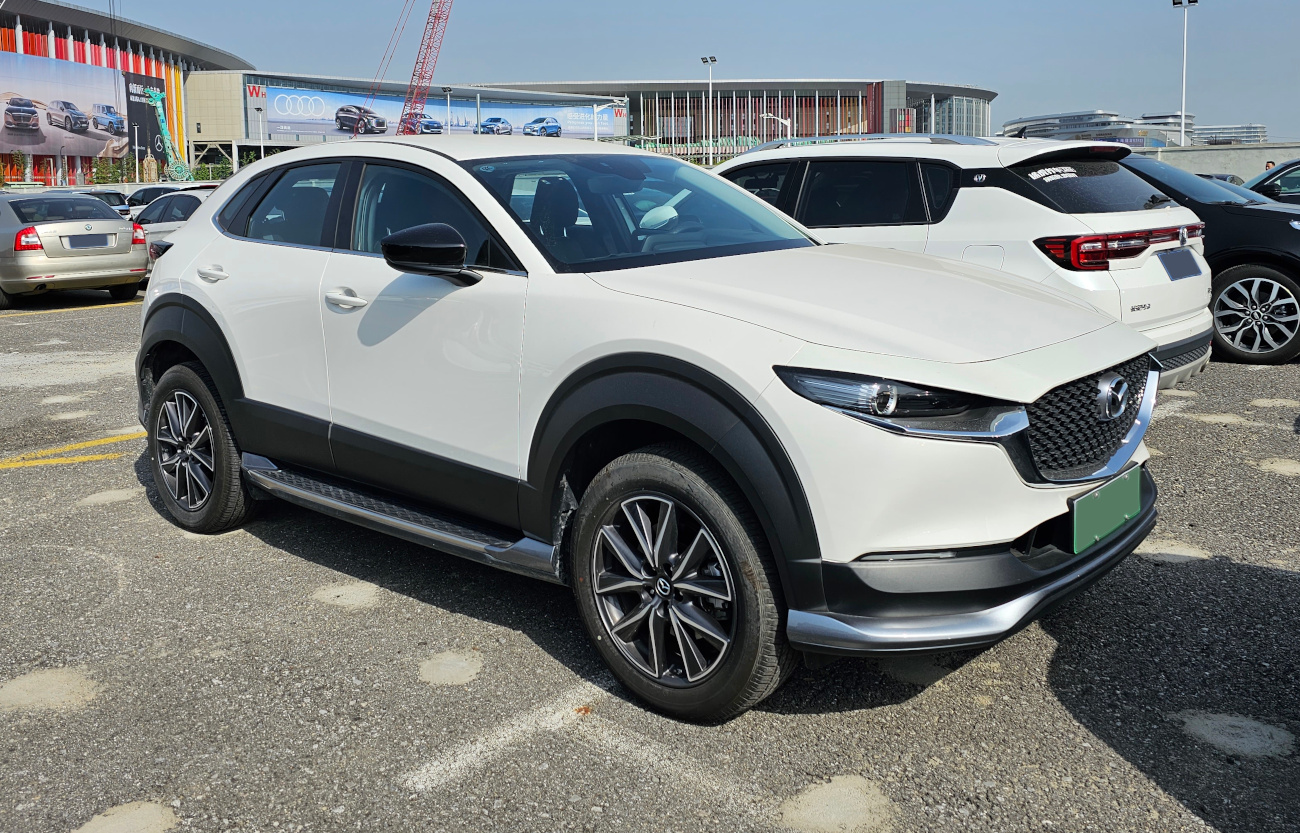
Mazda CX-30 EV
