= Deepal S09 =

Full-size SUV

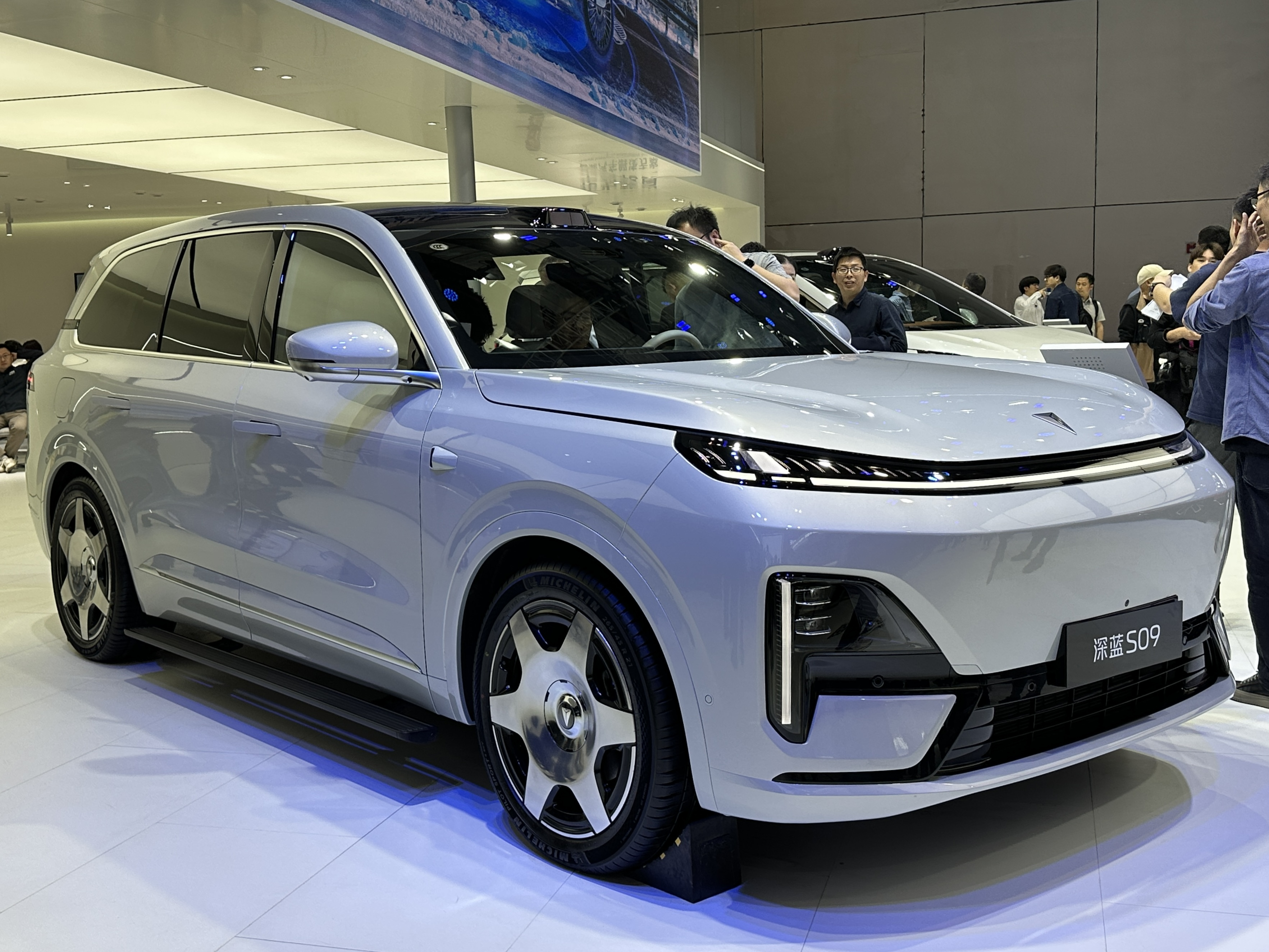
- Deepal S09 at Auto Shanghai 2025

Overview
- Manufacturer: Deepal (Changan Automobile)
- Model code: D587
- Production: 2025–present
- Assembly: China: Nanjing

Body and chassis
- Class: Full-size SUV
- Body style: 5-door SUV
- Layout: Front-engine, rear-motor, rear-wheel-drive Front-engine, dual-motor, all-wheel-drive
- Platform: Changan EPA1 platform

Powertrain
- Engine: Petrol range extender: 1.5 L JL469ZQ1 I4-T
- Electric motor: 231kW "ATMD02" motor (rear axle); 131 kW "AYDM01" motor (front axle, AWD only)
- Hybrid drivetrain: Series hybrid
- Battery: 40.18 kW CATL LFP battery

Dimensions
- Wheelbase: 3,105 mm (122.2 in)
- Length: 5,205 mm (204.9 in)
- Width: 1,996 mm (78.6 in)
- Height: 1,800 mm (70.9 in)
- Curb weight: 2,510–2,590 kg (5,534–5,710 lb) (RWD); 2,668–2,690 kg (5,882–5,930 lb) (AWD)

The Deepal S09 (Chinese: 深蓝S09; pinyin: Shēnlán S09) is a range-extended full-size SUV produced by Changan Automobile and sold under the Deepal brand.

== Overview ==
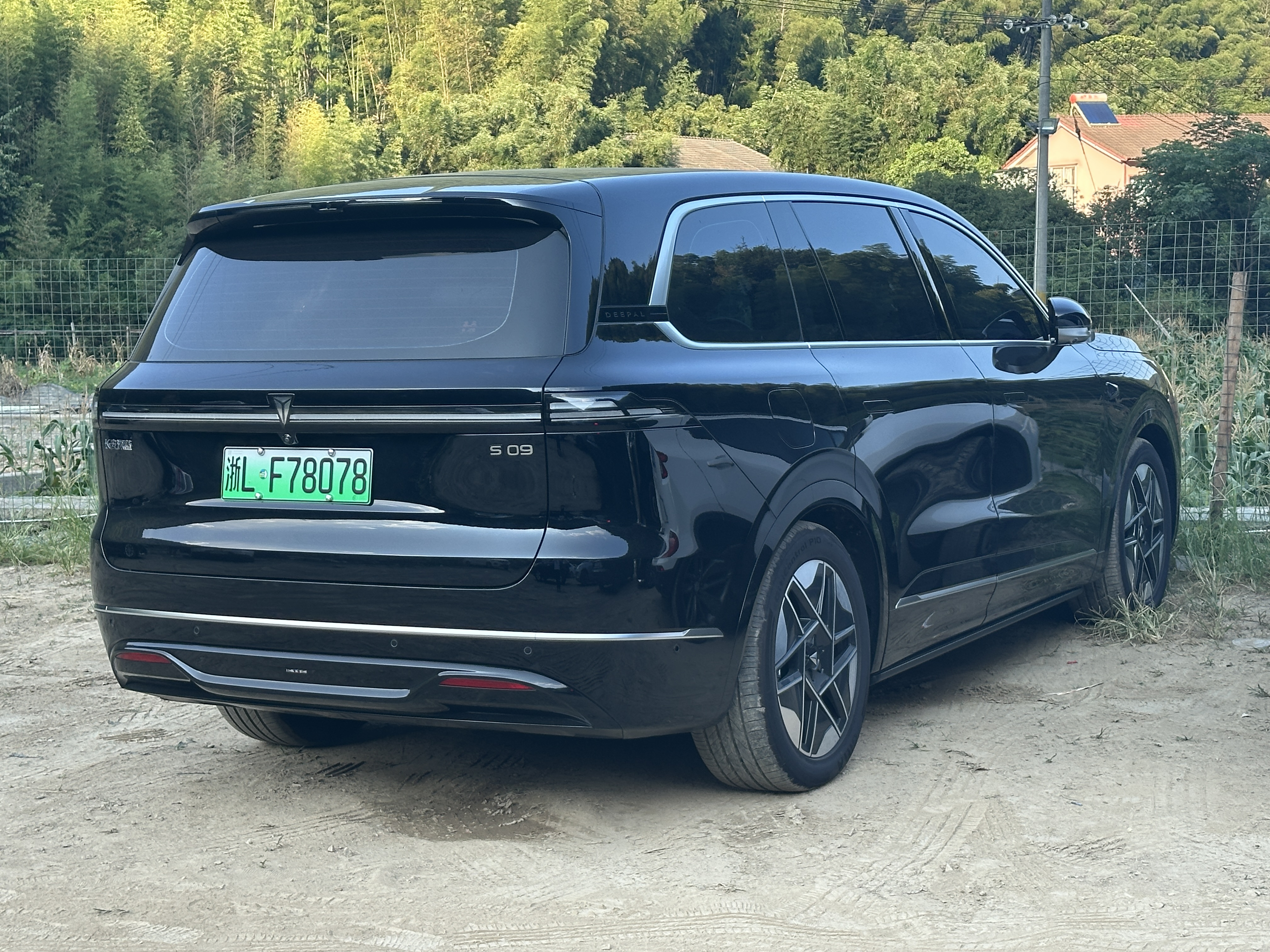
Rear view

The Deepal S09 shares Changan's EPA1 platform with the S07, G318, L07, and S05 models. It is Deepal's second model to utilize an all-wheel-drive powertrain.

Pre-sales started at the 2025 Shanghai Auto Show. The S09 launched on May 22, 2025. Customer deliveries began on the same day.

=== Features ===
The Deepal S09 features Huawei's ADAS system. It also features a full-width daytime running light bar at the front and a stepped light bar at the rear.

In the interior the dashboard has a pair of 15.6-inch OLED screens and a traditional instrument cluster is replaced with a 43-inch heads-up display from Huawei. The rear features a 21.3-inch 3K screen that folds from the ceiling. An 18-speaker system is also included. The interior also uses a single wireless phone charger as well as 4 cup holders. The S09 also comes with a 10-liter heating and cooling unit for drinks and food.

== Powertrain ==
The S09 is available exclusively as an extended-range electric vehicle. All versions use the Super Range Extension 2.0 technology consisting of a 1.5-liter turbocharged inline 4 engine codenamed JL469ZQ1 as a generator, a 310 horsepower (230 kW; 310 PS) motor codenamed ATMD02 mounted to the rear for all versions, and an additional 176 horsepower (131 kW; 178 PS) motor codenamed AYDM01 mounted on the front for all-wheel-drive models. Regardless of layout, all models have a top speed of 205 kilometres per hour (127 mph).

It supports 800v fast-charging that enables 300 km to be added in as fast as 10 minutes. The battery is a 40.18 kW LFP battery produced by CATL.

== Sales ==
Year	China
2025	12,351
