= Deepal S05 =

Compact crossover SUV

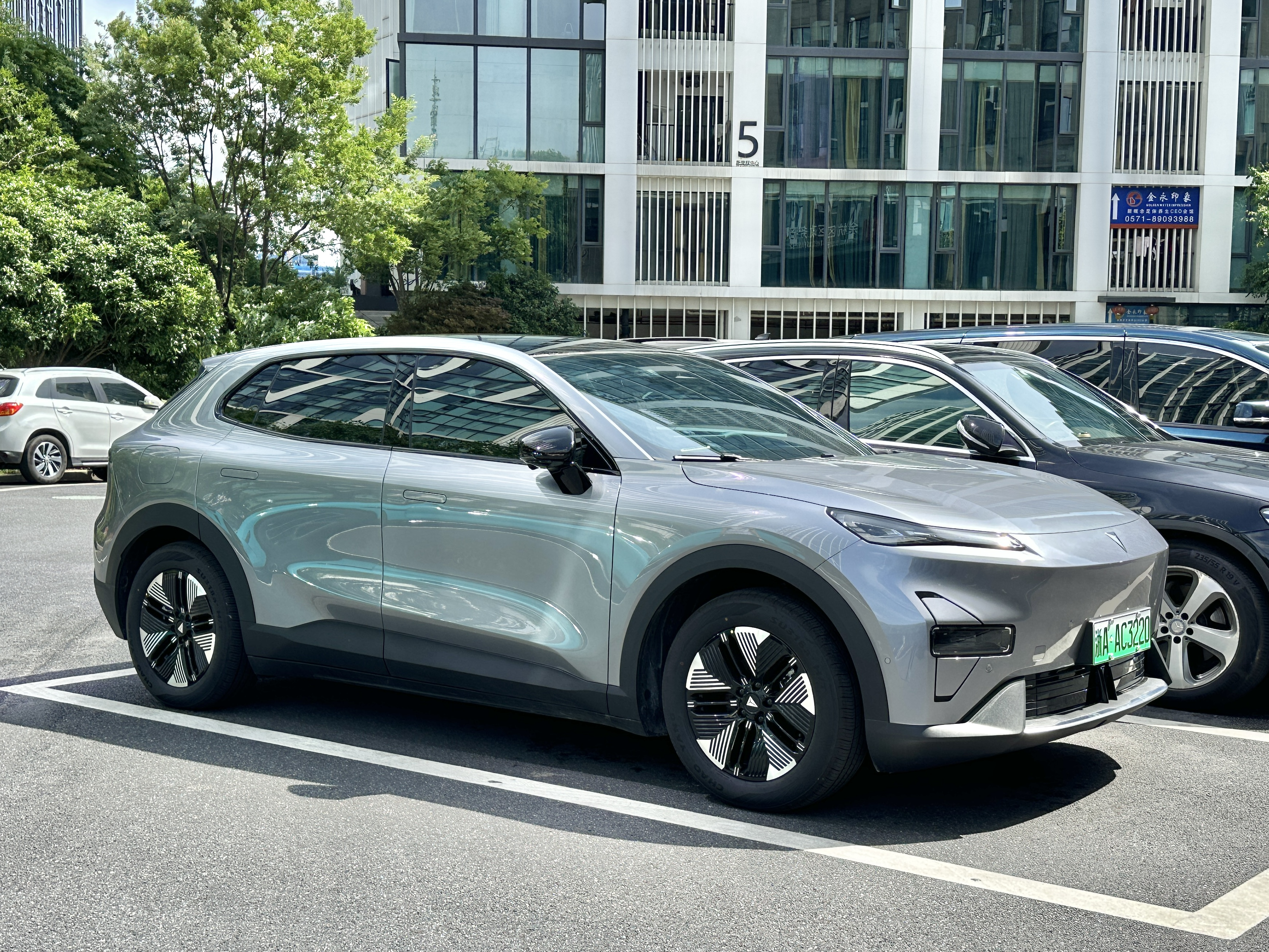

Overview
- Manufacturer: Deepal (Changan Automobile)
- Model code: C857
- Production: 2024–present
- Assembly: China: Nanjing; Thailand: Rayong
- Designer: Under the lead of Klaus Zyciora

Body and chassis
- Class: Compact crossover SUV (C)
- Body style: 5-door SUV
- Layout: Rear-motor, rear-wheel-drive (BEV); Dual-motor, all-wheel-drive (BEV, Europe); Front-engine, rear-motor, rear-wheel-drive (EREV)
- Platform: Changan EPA1 platform

Powertrain
- Engine: Petrol range extender: 1.5 L JL469Q1 I4
- Electric motor: Permanent magnet synchronous: XTDM40 (EV); XTDM38 (EREV)
- Power output: 218–268 hp (163–200 kW; 221–272 PS) (RWD models); 429 hp (320 kW; 435 PS) (AWD, Europe)
- Hybrid drivetrain: Range extender
- Battery: 27.3 kWh LFP CATL; 28.39 kWh LFP; 56.1 kWh LFP CATL; 68.8 kWh LFP CATL
- Range: 1,234 km (767 mi) (CLTC)
- Electric range: 200–215 km (124–134 mi) (EREV, CLTC); 510–620 km (317–385 mi) (EV, CLTC); 170 km (106 mi) (EREV, NEDC); 460–560 km (286–348 mi) (EV, NEDC)

Dimensions
- Wheelbase: 2,880 mm (113.4 in)
- Length: 4,620 mm (181.9 in)
- Width: 1,900 mm (74.8 in)
- Height: 1,600 mm (63.0 in)
- Kerb weight: 1,770–1,835 kg (3,902–4,045 lb)

The Deepal S05 (Chinese: 深蓝S05; pinyin: Shēnlán S05) is a compact crossover SUV produced by Changan Automobile under its Deepal brand. Sales of the S05 started in the third quarter of 2024.

The Deepal S05 shares Changan's EPA1 platform with the S07, G318, and L07 models.

== Equipment ==
The Deepal S05 is equipped with Huawei xPixel headlights, which are capable of acting as a 1.3-million pixel 120-inch projector. Lower trims come with an 8-speaker system while higher trims use a 14-speaker system. The infotainment system uses a 15.4-inch 2.5K center touchscreen with Deepal OS 3.0 software, and all models come with the Qualcomm Snapdragon SA8155P chip installed. There is a AR-HUD in place of a traditional instrument panel. The center console features a 13-litre (0.46 cu ft) temperature controlled compartment capable of heating and cooling, and the ceiling contains a 1.9 m^{2} (20 sq ft) panoramic sunroof. EV versions have a 159-litre (5.6 cu ft) frunk in addition to a 651-litre (23.0 cu ft) rear cargo area, which is reduced to 464 litres (16.4 cu ft) for EREV models.

The S05 uses a sensor suite including five high-definition cameras, five mmWave radars, and 12 ultrasonic sensors, allowing for ADAS functions such as lane centering control and adaptive cruise control.

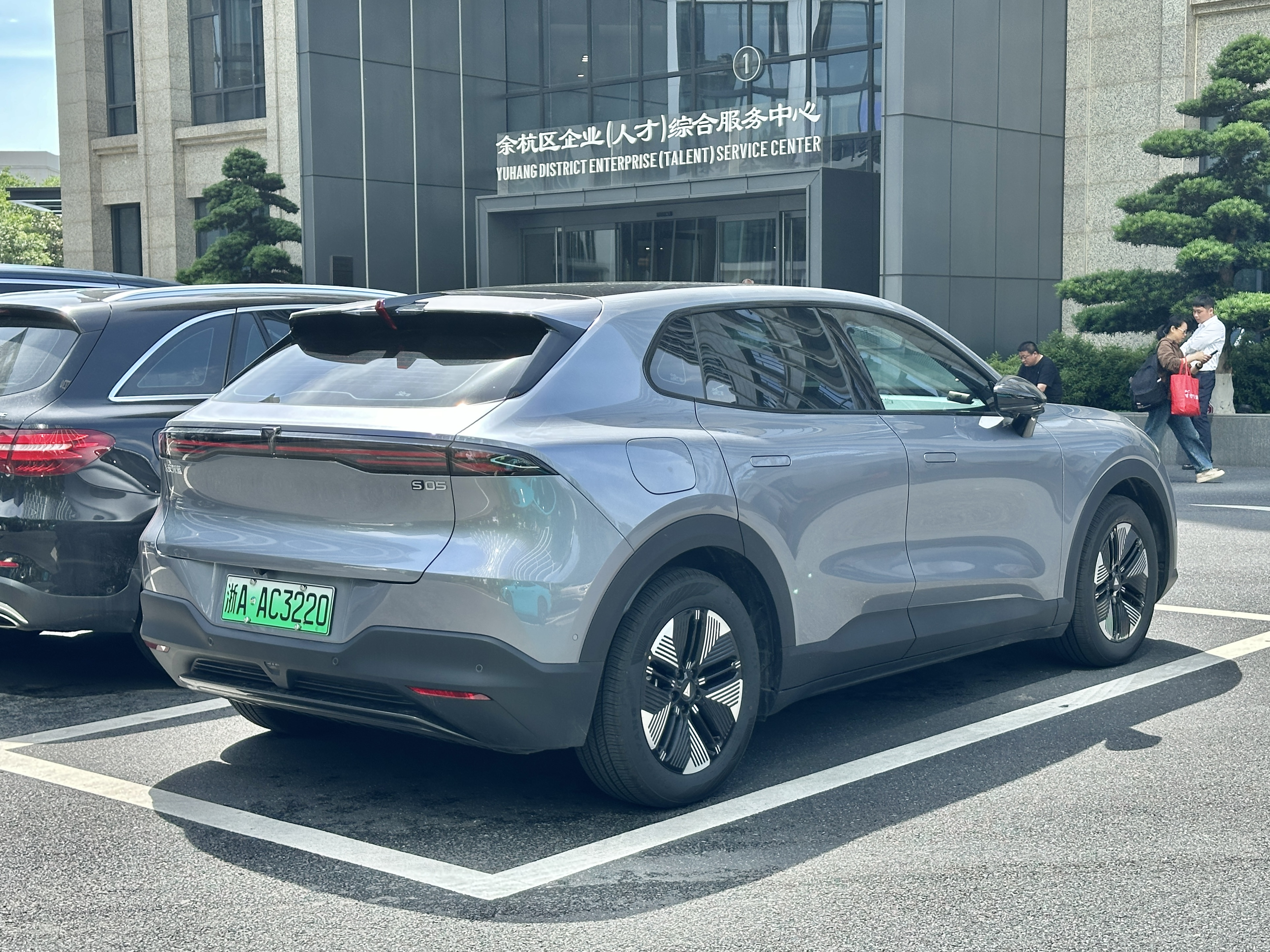
Rear view

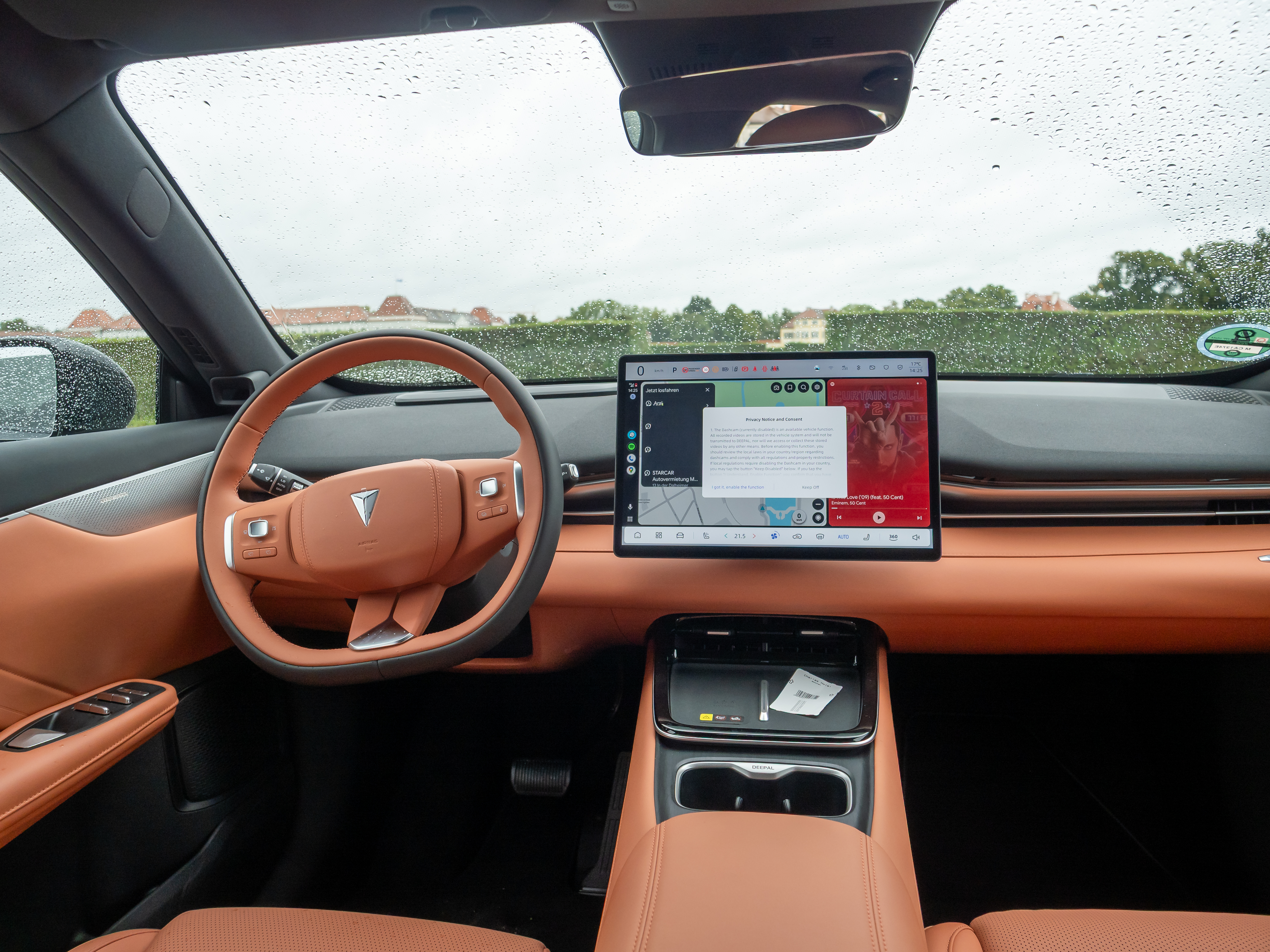
Interior

== Powertrain ==
In most markets, the S05 is available in either battery-electric or range extended variants, both exclusively available in rear-wheel drive. Electric models have a 235 hp (175 kW; 238 PS) motor paired with a 56.12 kWh CATL-supplied LFP battery capable of 3C charging for a 30–80% recharge time of 15 minutes, and providing a CLTC range rating of 510 kilometres (320 mi). Range-extended models have a 215 hp (160 kW; 218 PS) motor, with power supplied by a 1.5-litre naturally-aspirated port-injected petrol engine outputting 97 hp (72 kW; 98 PS), and a CATL 27.28 kWh LFP battery pack capable of recharging from 30–80% in 20 minutes. It is capable of providing electric range ratings of 155 kilometres (96 mi) on the WLTP or 200 kilometres (124 mi) on CLTC, and 1,234 kilometres (767 mi) of combined range on CLTC. It takes 7.3 seconds for the EV models to accelerate from 0–100 km/h (62 mph) while it takes 7.9 seconds for EREV models.

A Europe-only AWD model was confirmed at the 2025 Munich Motor Show. It produces 429 horsepower and is mated to a 68.8 kWh LFP battery, which all European models use. The AWD version of the S05 can go from 0–100 km/h (62 mph) in 5.5 seconds.

== Markets ==
=== Australia ===
The S05 will be heading to Australia alongside the Deepal E07 in the second half of 2025.

=== Brunei ===
The S05 was launched in Brunei, alongside the S07 electric, on 22 December 2025 and it is available in the sole REEV variant.

=== China ===
The S05 was initially launched on 20 October 2024 in its home market, after pre-orders opened a month earlier on 20 September for both EV and EREV variants.

=== Indonesia ===
The S05 was launched in Indonesia on 21 July 2026, with EV and REEV models. The EV variants were available in Plus and Max trim, and REEV variant was exclusive in Max trim.

=== Pakistan ===
The S05 was launched in Pakistan on 14 November 2025, in the sole REEV variant.

=== Singapore ===
The S05 was launched in Singapore on 20 June 2026, in the sole Electric variant using the 68.8 kWh battery pack.

=== South Africa ===
The S05 was launched in South Africa on 2 November 2026, in the sole unnamed REEV variant.

=== Thailand ===
The S05 was launched in Thailand on 24 March 2025, with three trim levels available: Lite, Plus and Max. In Thailand, it is available as either battery electric (BEV) or range extender electric (REEV) models. Domestic production for the Thai market commenced on 16 May 2025.

=== United Kingdom ===
The model has been confirmed for the United Kingdom and was initially planned to launch in the middle of 2025 alongside the S07. Deepal announced in September 2025 that the S05 will launch in the UK by the end of 2025.

== Safety ==
Euro NCAP test results Deepal S05 (LHD) (2025)
Test	Points	%
Overall:	5 /5 stars	
Adult occupant:	37.9	94%
Child occupant:	43.0	87%
Pedestrian:	49.8	78%
Safety assist:	13.7	76%

== Sales ==
On 5 November 2026, Deepal announced the 300,000th S05 had been delivered.

Year	China		
Year	EV	EREV	Total
2024	20,758	5,366	26,124
2025	90,494	6,783	97,277
