= Deepal G318 =

Mid-size crossover SUV

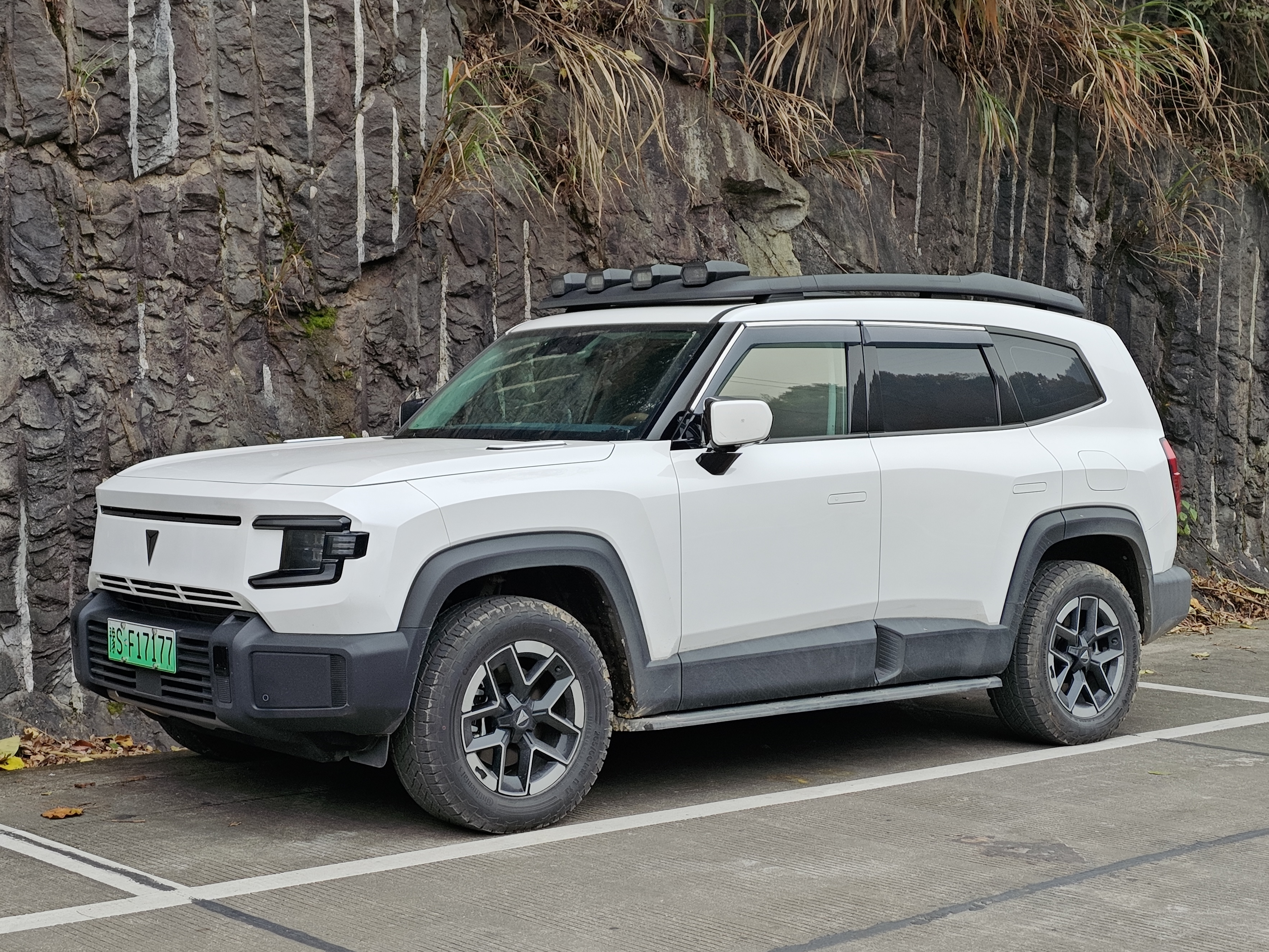

Overview
- Manufacturer: Deepal (Changan Automobile)
- Model code: C318
- Production: 2024–present
- Assembly: China: Nanjing

Body and chassis
- Class: Mid-size crossover SUV (D)
- Body style: 5-door SUV
- Layout: Front-engine, rear-motor, rear-wheel-drive; Front-engine, dual-motor, all-wheel-drive
- Platform: Changan EPA1 platform
- Chassis: Unibody
- Related: Changan Nevo A07; Deepal L07; Deepal S07; Mazda EZ-6; Mazda EZ-60; Deepal SL03; Deepal S09; Deepal S05

Powertrain
- Engine: 1.5 L JL469ZQ1, as generator)
- Electric motor: AYDM01 AC induction/asynchronous, Permanent magnet motors (front, optional); XTDM33 AC induction/asynchronous, Permanent magnet motors (rear)
- Power output: 248 horsepower (185 kW; 251 PS) (RWD); 424 horsepower (316 kW; 430 PS) (4WD) (131kW front motor, 185kW rear motor)
- Hybrid drivetrain: Series hybrid (EREV)
- Battery: 18.4 kWh; 35.1 kWh
- Plug-in charging: V2L: 3.3kW (interior socket), 6kW (total)

Dimensions
- Wheelbase: 2,880 mm (113.4 in)
- Length: 4,915 mm (193.5 in)
- Width: 1,985 mm (78.1 in)
- Height: 1,885 mm (74.2 in)
- Curb weight: 2,060–2,360 kg (4,541.5–5,202.9 lb)

The Deepal G318 (Chinese: 深蓝G318; pinyin: Shēnlán G318) is a mid-size crossover SUV produced by Changan Automobile under their premium NEV brand, Deepal. Sales of the G318 started in the first quarter of 2024.

== Overview ==
In January 2024, Deepal presented its third model in the range, this time departing far from the aggressive and modern styling of the L07 and S07 models. The G318 model, taking its name from the highway connecting the eastern coast of China with the autonomous region of Tibet, has been maintained in the raw aesthetics of an angular SUV with proportions reminiscent of off-road vehicles.

The front fascia is decorated with full LED lighting in the shape of the letter "C", as well as a roof luggage rack with additional light segments. Massive bumpers were seamlessly connected to the black plastic wheel arch casing, the wheels were mounted on thick-profile off-road tires, while the rear was topped with a trunk lid with a spare wheel placed outside. The rear lamps have a minimalist form.

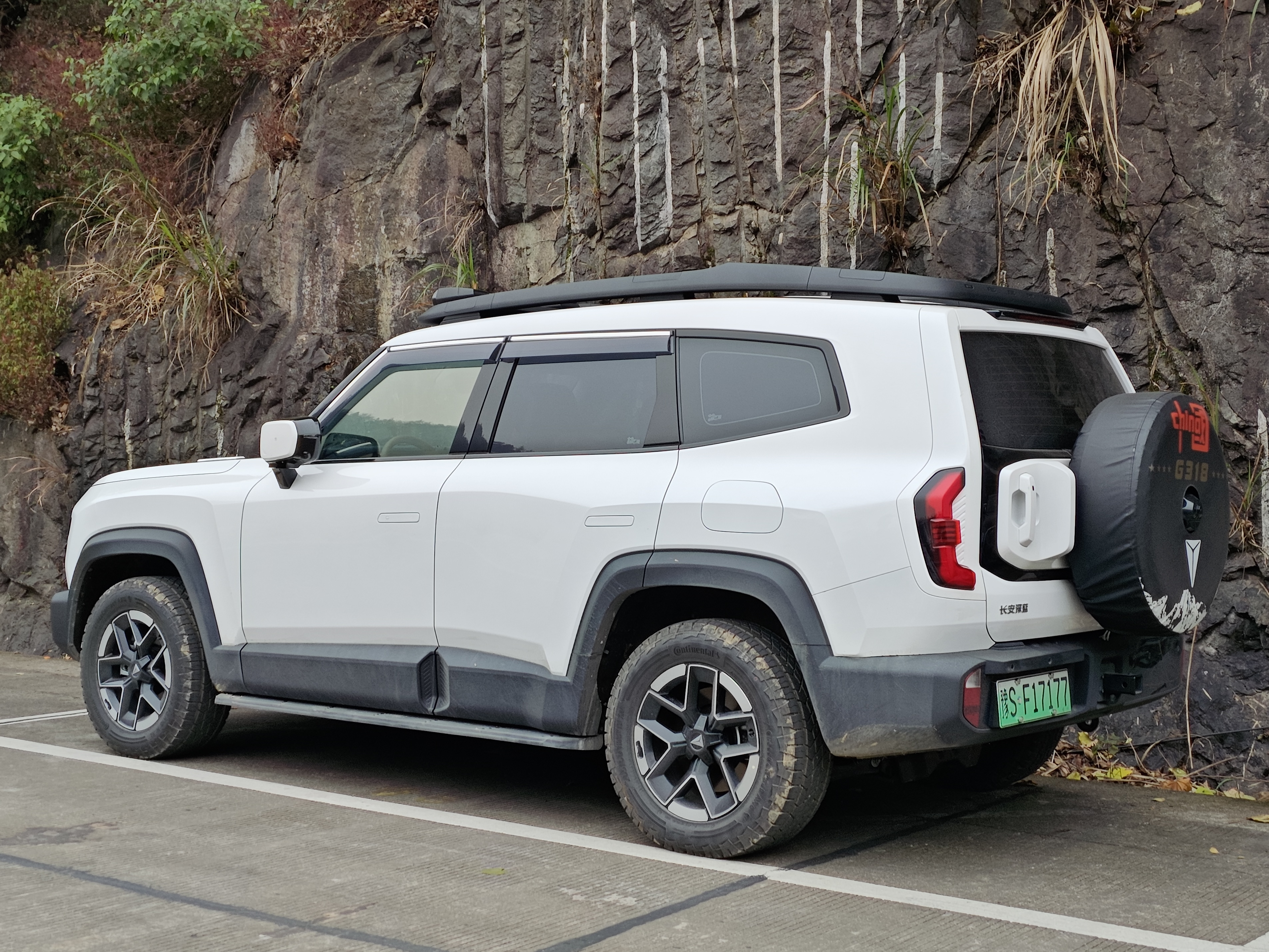
Rear view

== Specifications ==
The G318 offers a 1.5-liter turbocharged petrol engine with 148 hp, serving as the so-called range-extender, extending the range in a combined cycle and not transferring power directly to the wheels. This is done by the electric motor, which in the basic version develops a power of 248 hp, and in the top version together with a second, additional engine of 424 hp. There are batteries with a capacity of 18.4 kWh and 35.1 kWh.

== Sales ==
Year	China
2024	6,966
2025	10,017
