= Deepal L06 =

Mid-size sedan

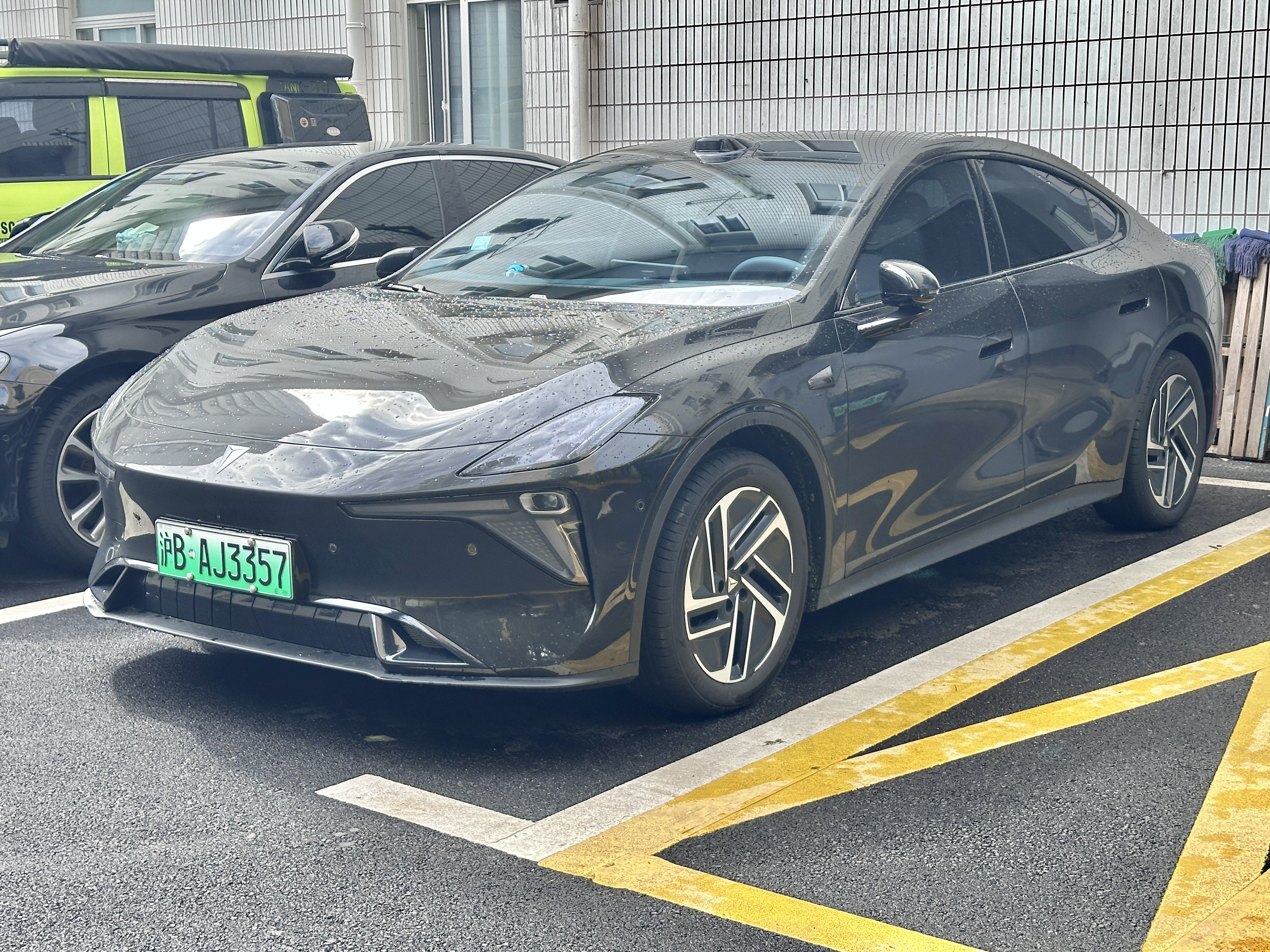

Overview
- Manufacturer: Deepal (Changan Automobile)
- Model code: C518
- Production: 2025–present
- Assembly: China: Nanjing
- Designer: Klaus Zyciora

Body and chassis
- Class: Mid-size car (D)
- Body style: 4-door sedan
- Layout: Rear-motor, rear-wheel-drive (EV); Front-engine, rear-motor, rear-wheel-drive (EREV)

Powertrain
- Engine: Petrol EREV: 1.5 L I4
- Battery: 28.39 kWh LFP; 56.12 kWh LFP CATL; 68.82 kWh LFP CATL
- Electric range: CLTC: 560–670 km (348–416 mi) (EV); 180 km (112 mi) (EREV)
- Plug-in charging: EV: 163–227 kW DC

Dimensions
- Wheelbase: 2,900 mm (114.2 in)
- Length: 4,830 mm (190.2 in)
- Width: 1,905 mm (75.0 in)
- Height: 1,480 mm (58.3 in)
- Curb weight: 1,795–1,830 kg (3,957–4,034 lb)

The Deepal L06 (Chinese: 深蓝L06; pinyin: Shēnlán L06) is a mid-size sedan produced by Changan Automobile under its Deepal brand. It is the first model of any Changan brand to be introduced after Changan became a state-owned company.

== Overview ==
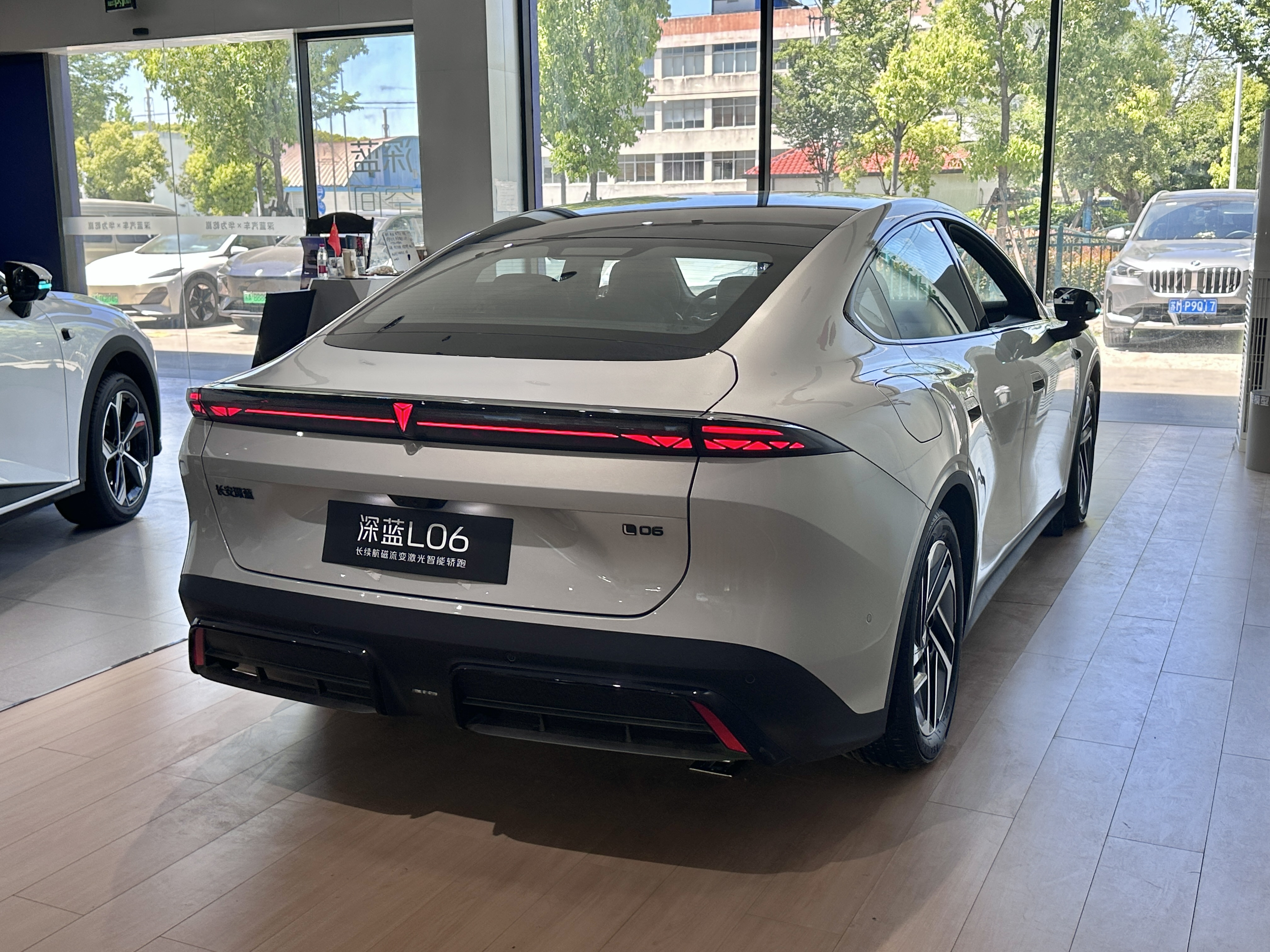
Rear view

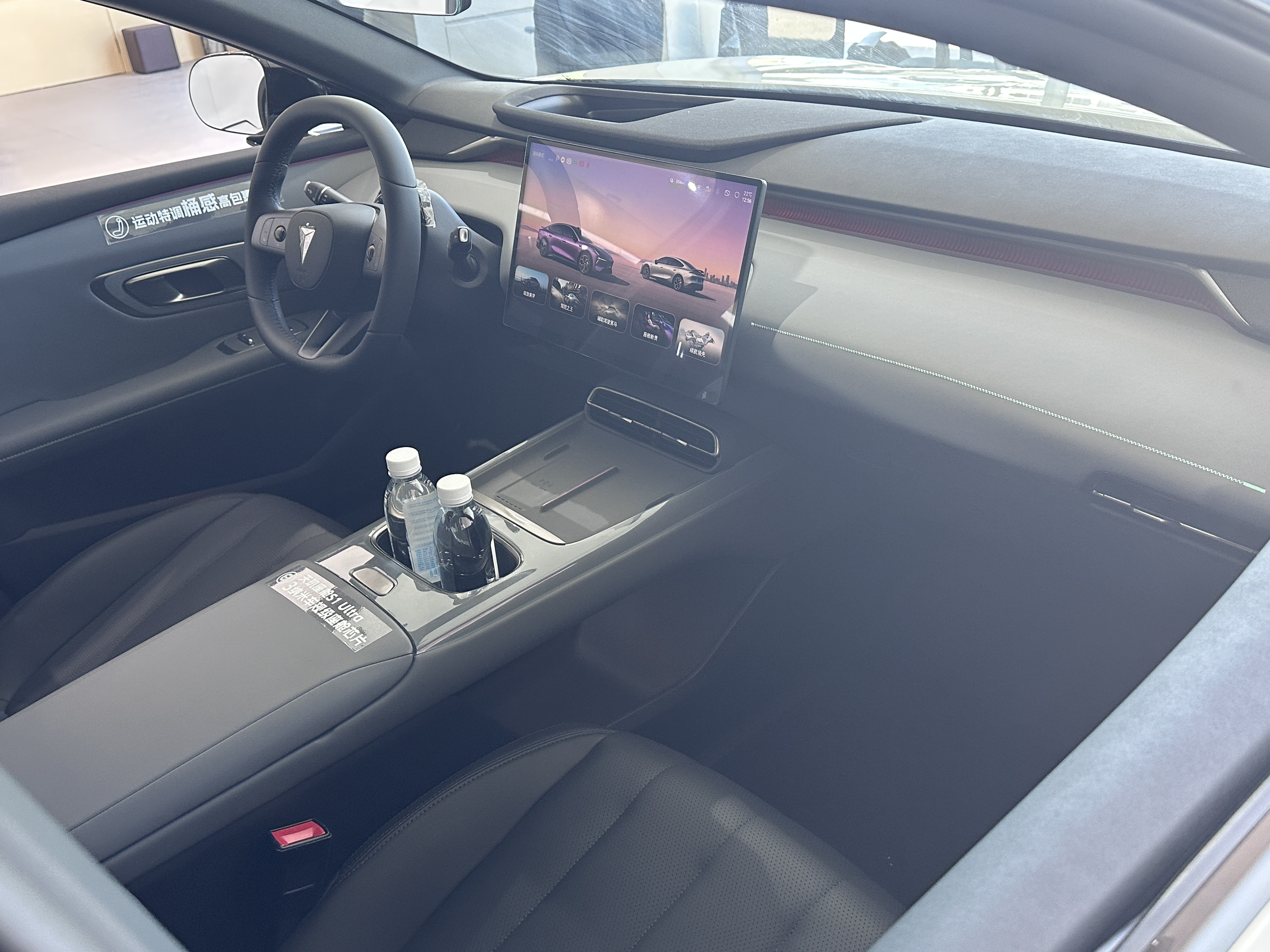
Interior

The L06 slots under the SL03 and L07 in Deepal's lineup. Just like the SL03, the L06 is available in both battery electric and range extended forms. Pre-sales began on October 31, 2025.

=== Design and features ===
All trims will come equipped with a 3-nanometer automotive-grade cockpit chip, making the L06 the first production car to do so, the Tianji Cabin S1 Ultra. Every trim will also come standard with LiDAR sensors. A closed-off grille and split headlights are both present. The L06 uses a coupe-like profile. The L06 debuts a new headlight design, using "blooming petal" style headlights. The interior adopts a T-shaped layout, uses a 50-inch AR-HUD, and has a large 15.6-inch central touchscreen.

The L06 is equipped with Magneride suspension, which Deepal claims is the first Chinese-designed vehicle to do so.

== Powertrain ==
Electric models receive a 268 horsepower (200 kW; 272 PS) motor, paired with a 56.12 kWh or 68.82 kWh battery, both of which use a lithium iron phosphate chemistry. EV models with the 56.12 kWh battery get a CLTC range of 560 kilometres (348 mi) and models with the 68.82 kWh battery get a range of 670 kilometres (416 mi). Extended range models use a 235 horsepower (175 kW; 238 PS) motor with a 28.39 kWh battery (also lithium iron phosphate) that provides an all-electric range of 112 miles (180 km). The EREV version uses a 1.5-liter naturally aspirated inline-four engine outputting 97 hp (72 kW; 98 PS) as a generator.

== Sales ==
Year	China
2025	8,021
