= Deepal =

Electric vehicle manufacturing company

Deepal Automobile Technology Co., Ltd.
- Native name: 深蓝汽车科技有限公司
- Formerly: Changan New Energy Automobile Technology
- Type: State-owned
- Industry: Automotive
- Founded: 2008; 18 years ago
- Headquarters: Chongqing, China
- Area served: China; Thailand; Australia; Mexico; Colombia; Dominican Republic; Jamaica; Pakistan; Nepal; Bangladesh; Indonesia; United Kingdom; Philippines; Spain; Portugal; Hong Kong; Middle East (excl. Yemen); North Africa; South Africa
- Key people: Deng Chenghao (CEO)
- Products: Motor vehicles
- Production output: ▲243,894 vehicles (2024)
- Owner: Changan Automobile (51%)
- Parent: Changan Automobile
- Website: deepal.com.cn

Deepal Automobile Technology Co., Ltd. (Chinese: 深蓝汽车; pinyin: Shēnlán Qìchē; lit. 'Deep Blue') is a Chinese electric vehicle manufacturing company owned by Changan Automobile.

Founded in 2018 as Chongqing Changan New Energy Automobile Technology, the company became an independent brand in 2023.

== History ==
In April 2008, Changan Automobile and Chongqing Science and Technology Venture Capital Co., Ltd. jointly invested to establish Changan New Energy Automobile Co., Ltd.

On December 8, 2017, Changan Automobile established its New Energy Division, consolidating the planning of new energy products, vehicle development, powertrain system development, procurement, and sales under a single division.

Between January 2020 and March 2022, Changan New Energy and the New Energy Division of Changan Automobile were consolidated to form Changan New Energy Automobile Technology. During this period, 12 investors participated in two separate funding rounds, temporarily reducing Changan Automobile's ownership from 100% to 40.66%. The company also announced its first model, the SL03 (codenamed C385), under the newly introduced Changan Shenlan (Chinese: 长安深蓝; pinyin: Cháng'ān Shēnlán) brand.

At the end of 2022, Changan Automobile increased its ownership stake in Changan New Energy Automobile Technology from 40.66% to 51.00% by acquiring a 10.34% stake from two shareholders, regaining majority control of the company.

In 2023, the English name of the Changan Shenlan brand was revealed as Deepal and Changan New Energy Automobile Technology was renamed Deepal Automobile Technology. The Deepal brand operates independently of the Changan Group.

In November 2023, Deepal introduced two models in Thailand, the L07 sedan and the S07 SUV. Both models are imported from China. Changan is constructing a production facility in Thailand, with the first phase of production scheduled to commence in the first quarter of 2025.

== Products ==
Deepal's first model, the SL03, was introduced in 2022. The current Deepal models use the Chang'an EPA NEV platform, separated into EPA0, EPA1 and EPA2. Five initial models will be released, 1 based on EPA0 and 4 based on EPA1.

=== Current models ===
- Deepal L06 (2025–present), mid-size sedan, BEV/PHEV(EREV)
- Deepal SL03 (2022–present), mid-size sedan, BEV/EREV
  - Deepal L07 (2024–present), a Huawei tech-focused version of the SL03
- Deepal S05 (2024–present), compact SUV, BEV/EREV
- Deepal S07 (2023–present), mid-size SUV, BEV/EREV
- Deepal S09 (2025–present), full-size SUV, EREV
- Deepal G318 (2023–present), mid-size SUV, BEV/EREV
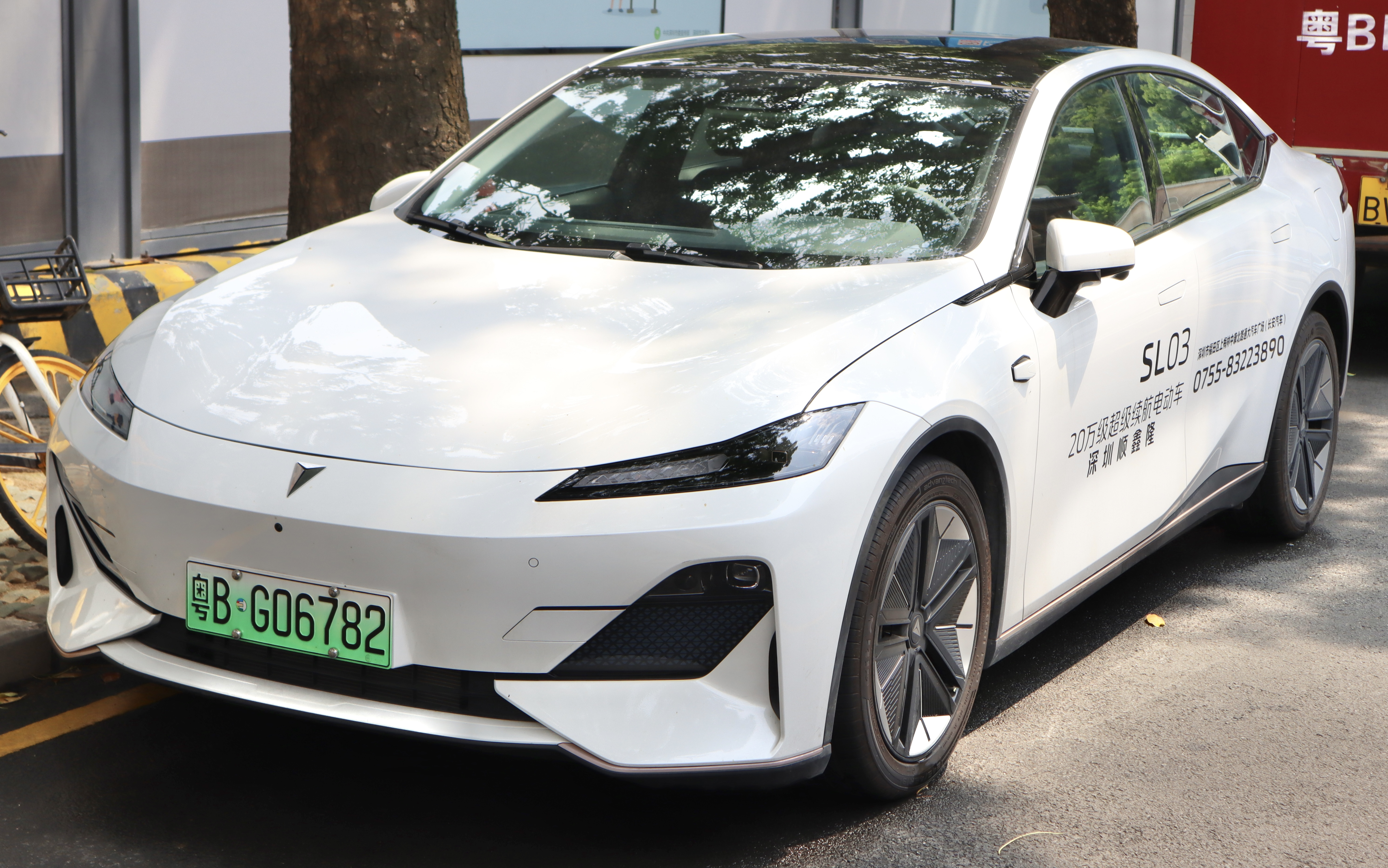
Deepal SL03

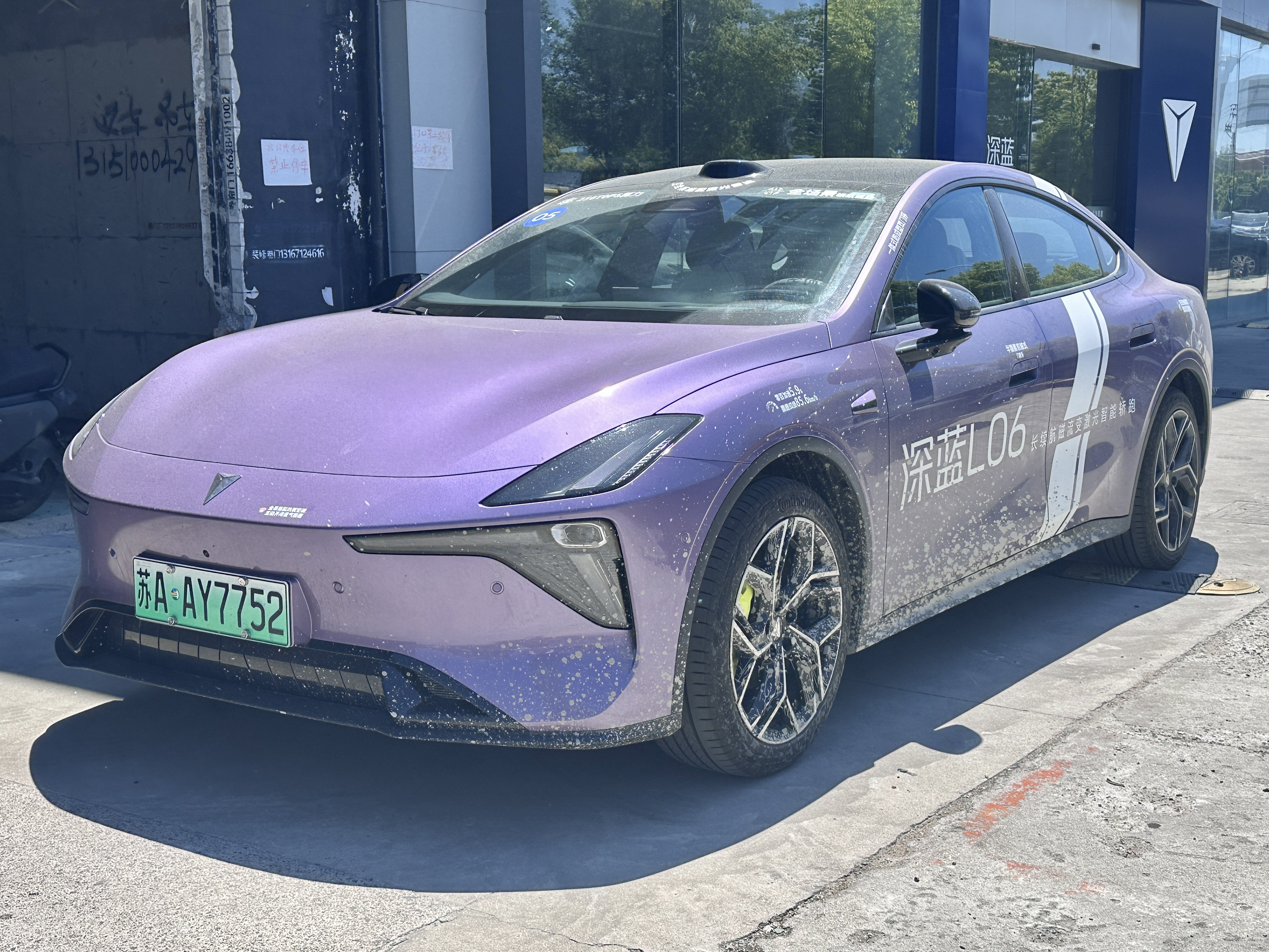
Deepal L06

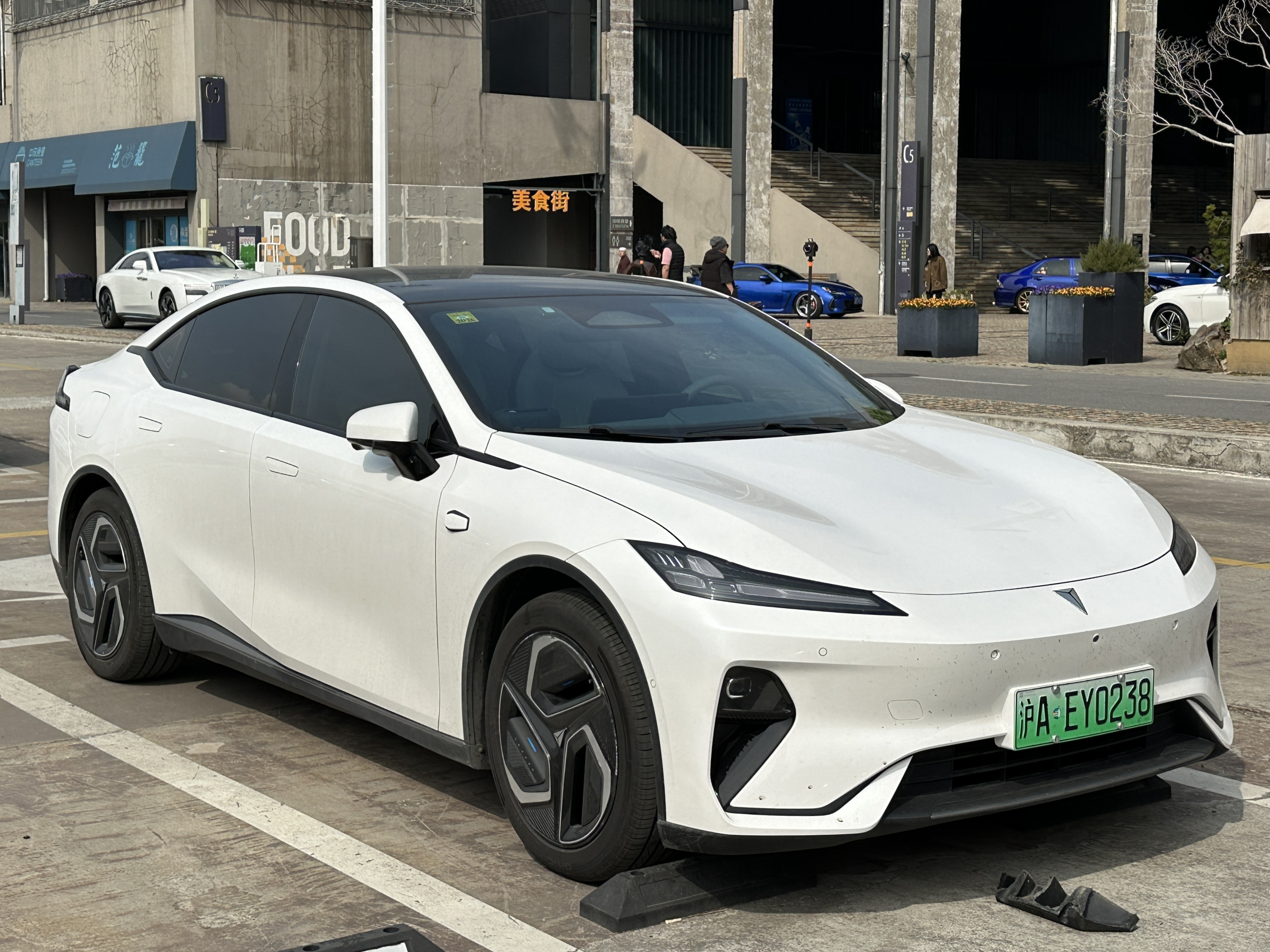
Deepal L07

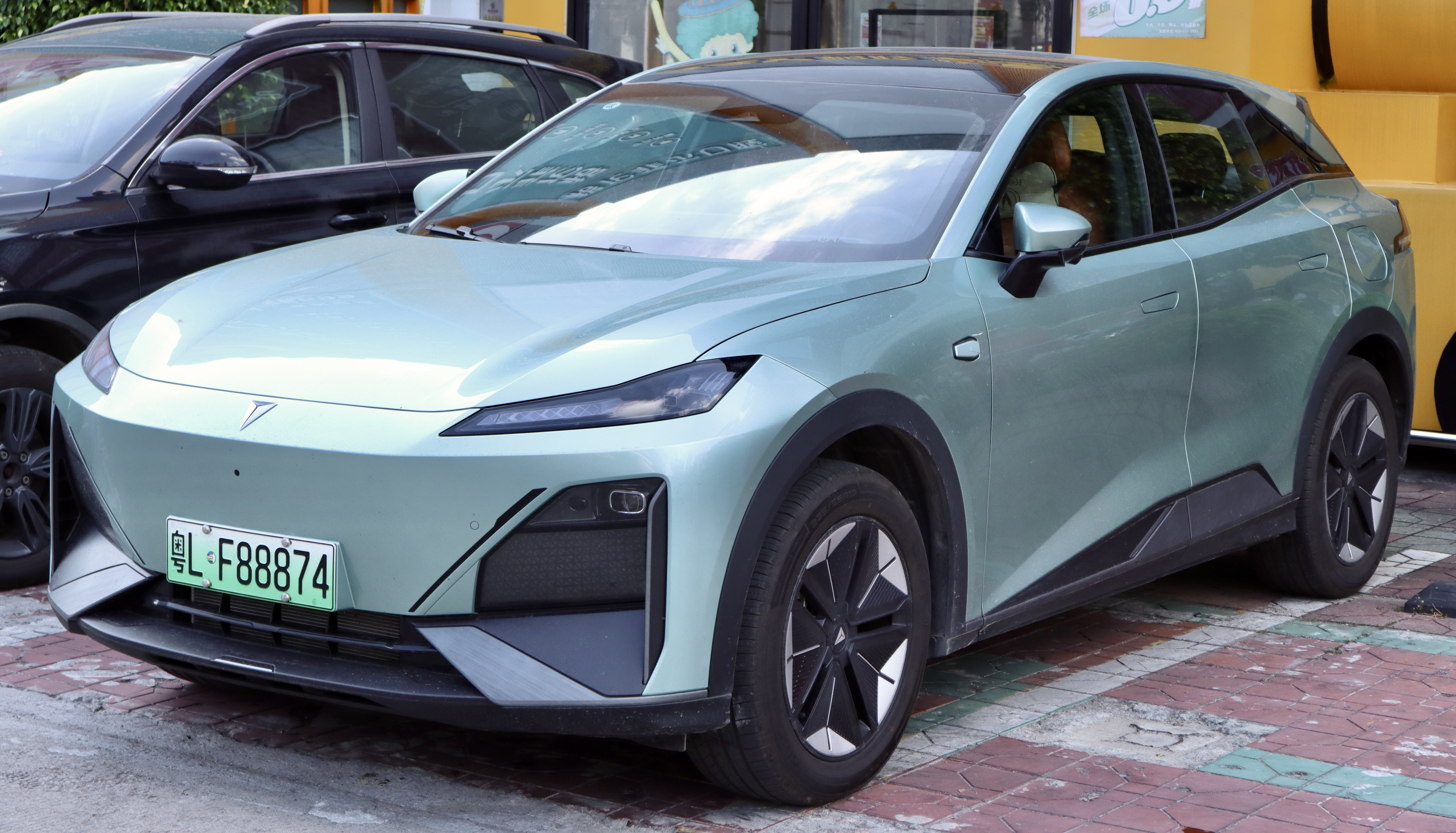
Deepal S07

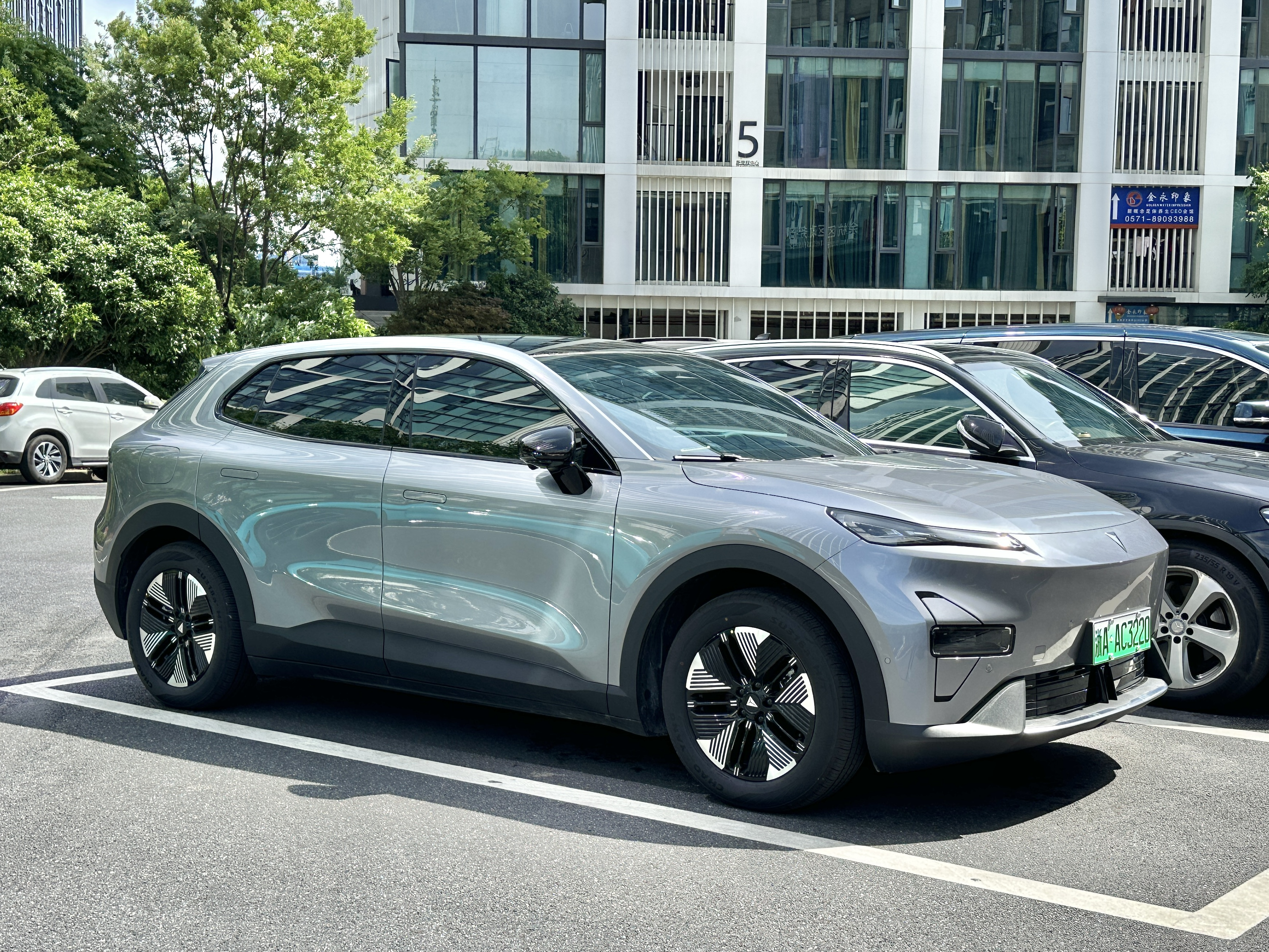
Deepal S05

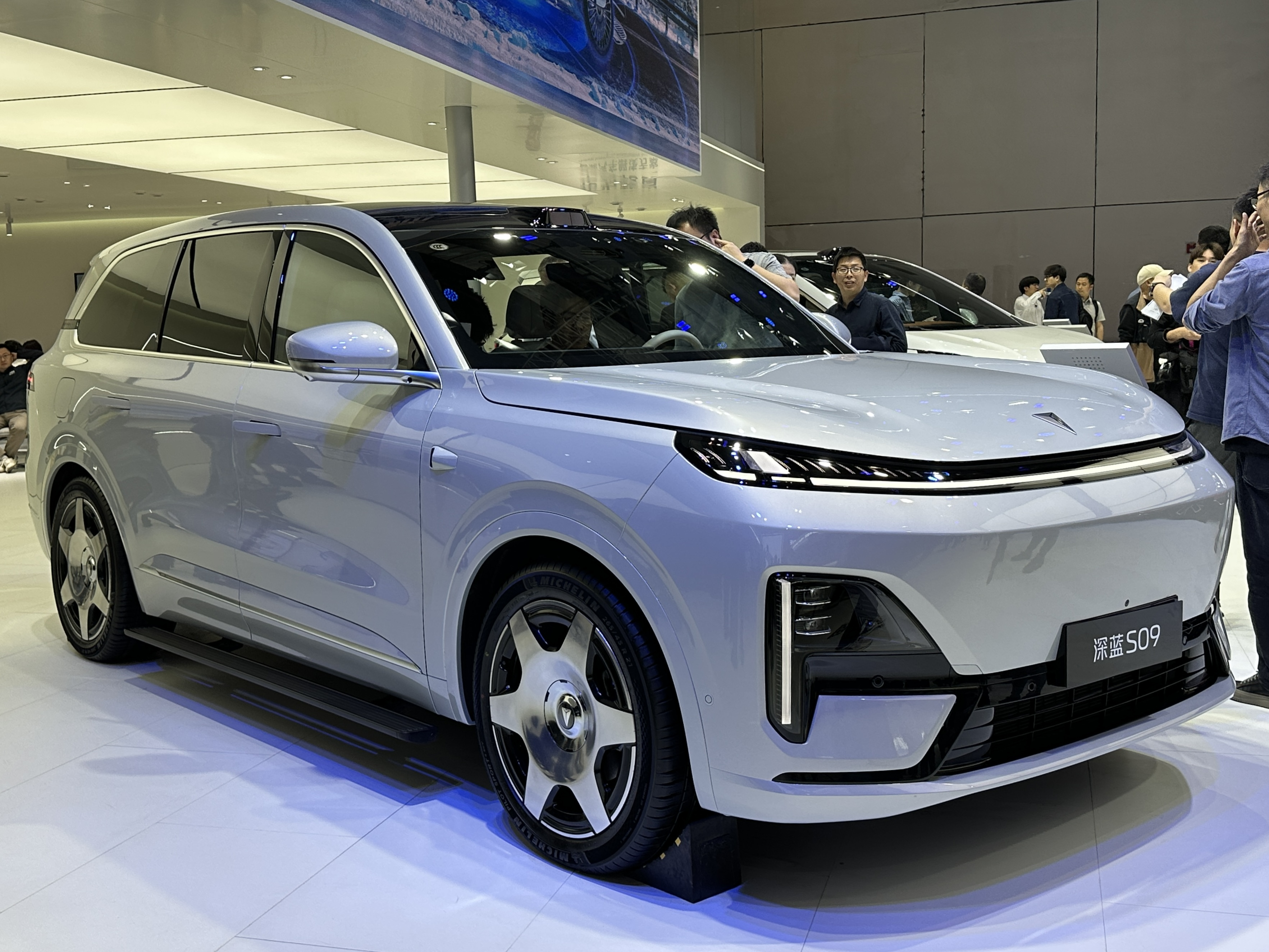
Deepal S09

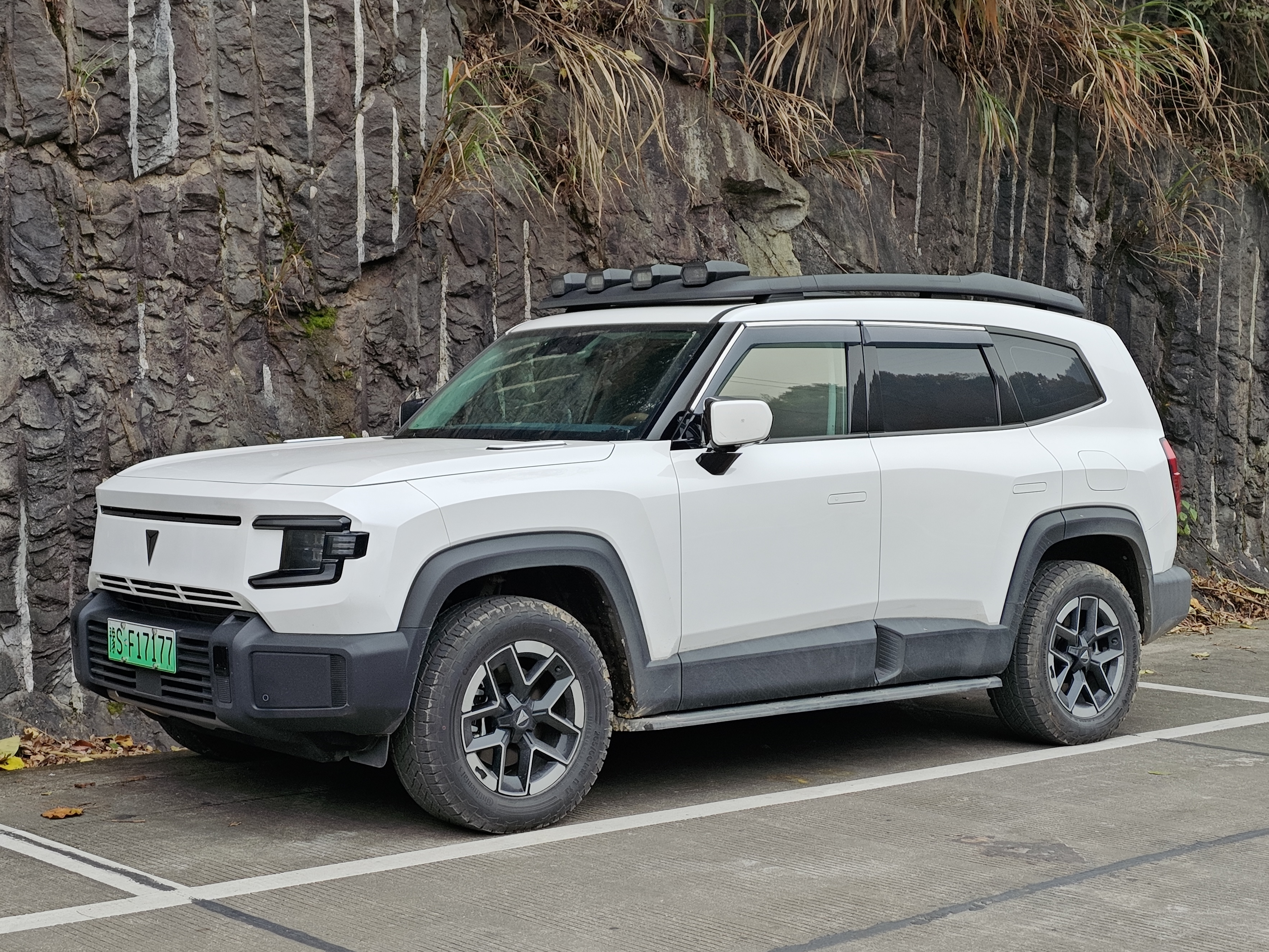
Deepal G318

==== Export models ====
- Deepal E07 (2024–present, export only), rebadged Changan Nevo E07, mid-size SUV
- Deepal Hunter K50 (2024–present, export only), rebadged Changan Nevo Hunter K50, pickup truck
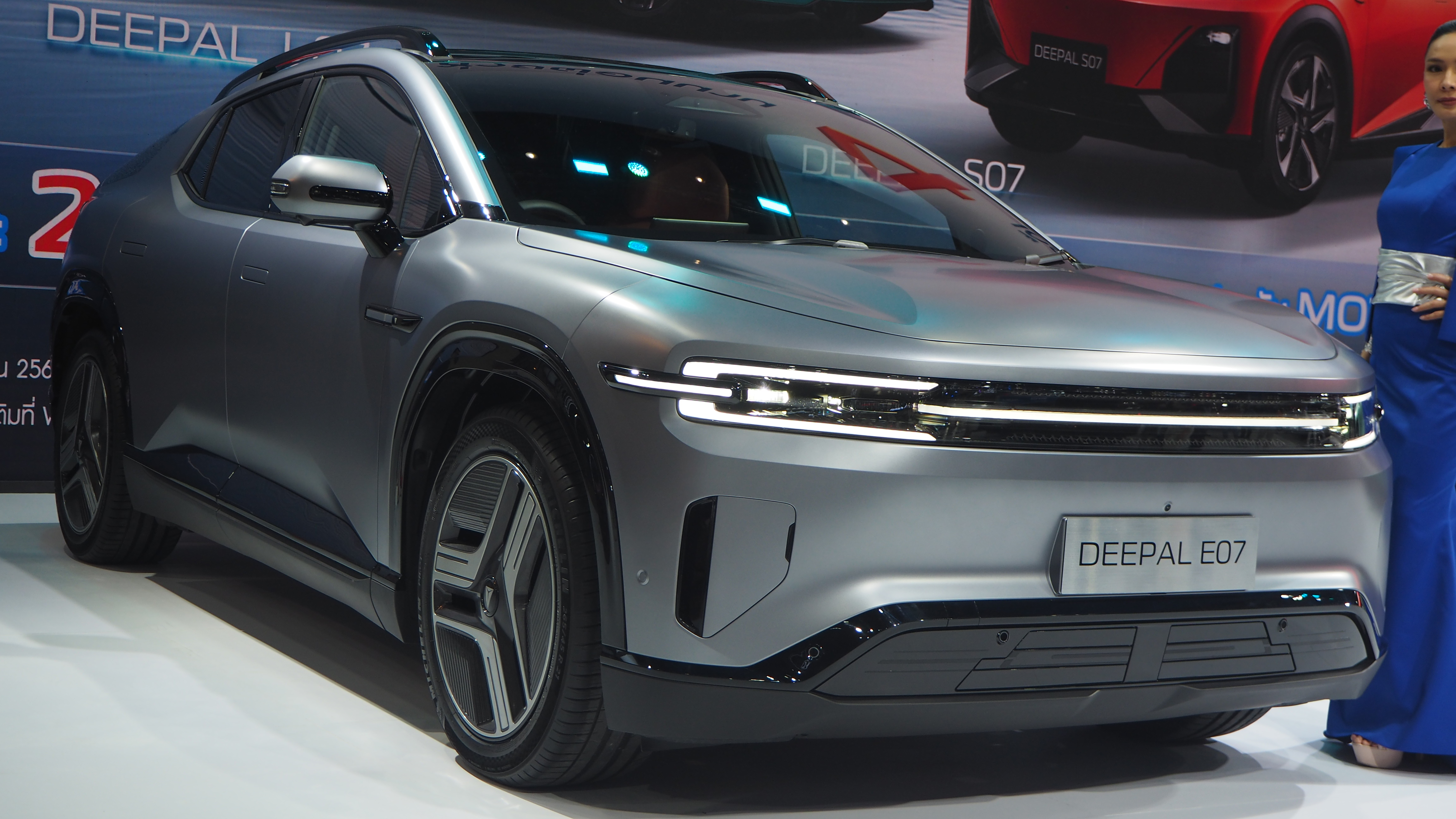
Deepal E07

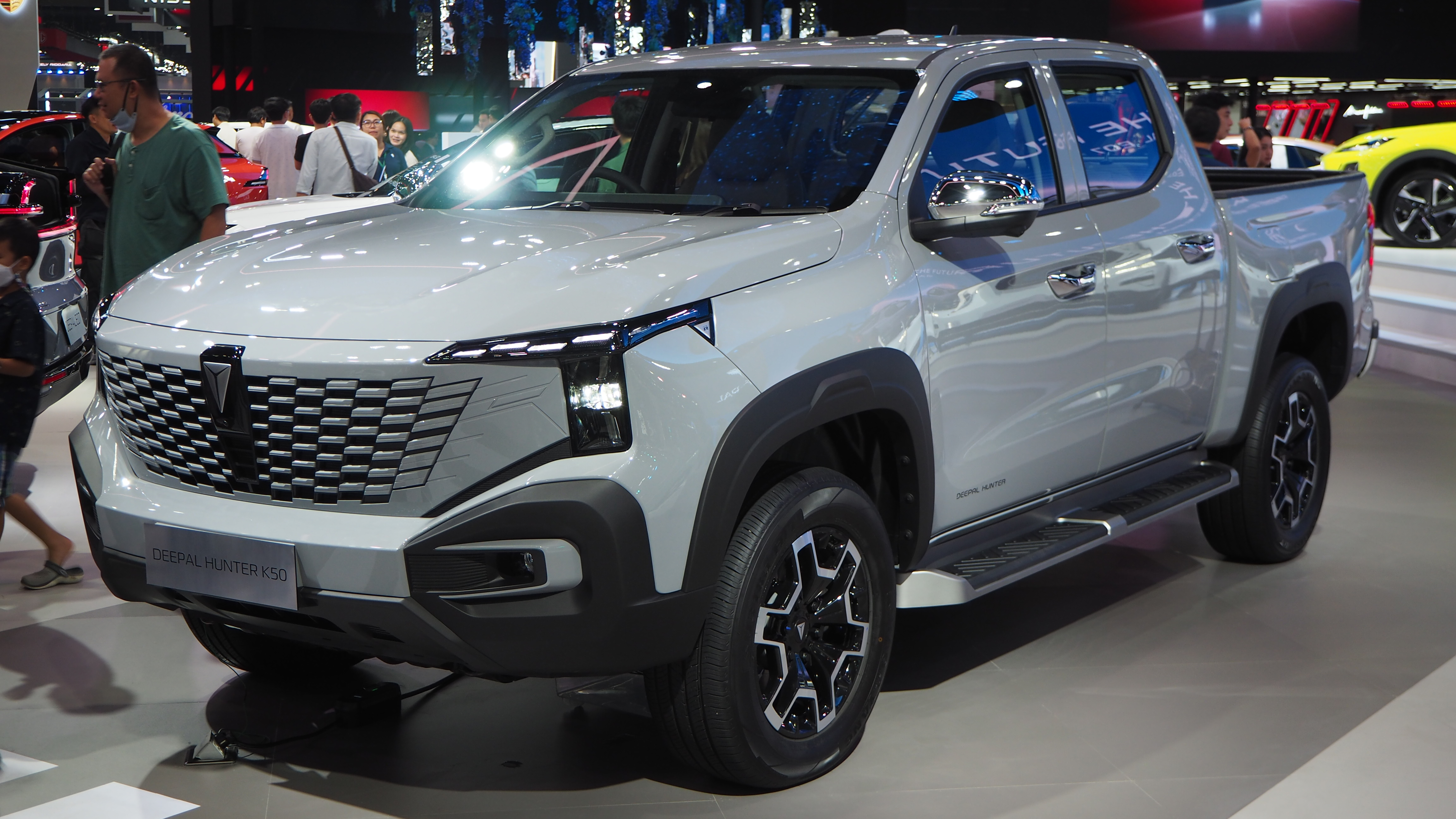
Deepal Hunter K50

== Sales ==
Year	Total
2022	33,354
2023	128,865
2024	243,894

== See also ==
- China Changan Automobile
- Automobile manufacturers and brands of China
- List of automobile manufacturers of China
