= Deepal E07 =

Mid-size crossover SUV

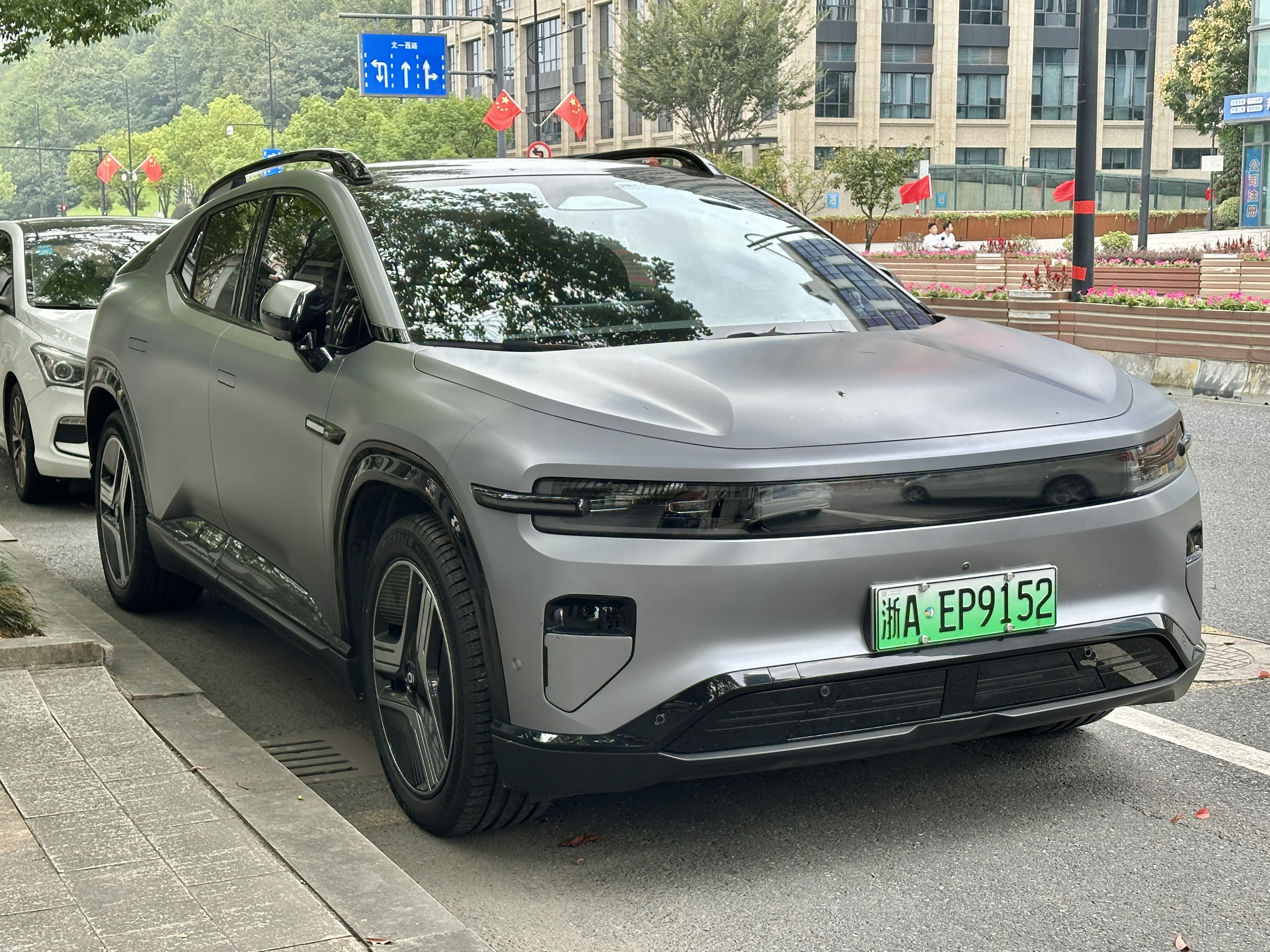
- Changan Nevo E07

Overview
- Manufacturer: Deepal (Changan Automobile)
- Model code: CD701
- Also called: Changan Nevo E07 (China)
- Production: 2024–present
- Assembly: China: Nanchang

Body and chassis
- Class: Mid-size crossover SUV (E)
- Body style: 5-door SUV
- Layout: Rear-motor, rear-wheel-drive (EV); Dual-motors, all-wheel-drive (EV); Front-engine, rear-motor, rear-wheel-drive (EREV)
- Platform: Changan SDA platform
- Related: Changan Nevo A06

Powertrain
- Engine: Petrol range extender: 1.5 L JL473QJ I4
- Electric motor: Permanent magnet synchronous
- Power output: 190 kW (255 hp; 258 PS) (RWD; Nepal); 252 kW (338 hp; 343 PS) (RWD); 440 kW (590 hp; 598 PS) (AWD)
- Hybrid drivetrain: Range extender
- Battery: 89.98 kWh CATL NMC (EV)
- Electric range: 510–705 km (317–438 mi) (EV, CLTC); Maximum 642 km (399 mi) (EV, NEDC); Maximum 550 km (342 mi) (EV, WLTP); 210 km (130 mi) (EREV, CLTC)

Dimensions
- Wheelbase: 3,120 mm (122.8 in)
- Length: 5,045 mm (198.6 in)
- Width: 1,996 mm (78.6 in)
- Height: 1,640 mm (64.6 in)
- Kerb weight: 2,278–2,398 kg (5,022–5,287 lb) (EV); 2,325–2,395 kg (5,126–5,280 lb) (EREV)

The Deepal E07 or the Changan Nevo E07 (Chinese: 长安启源E07) is a battery electric and range extender mid-size crossover SUV produced by Deepal, the electric vehicle subsidiary of Chinese automotive company Changan Automobile since 2024.

== Overview ==
In September 2023, the Changan Nevo CD701 prototype was presented, heralding another model in the range of the then newly established brand of the concern Changan, which was distinguished by an unconventional concept combining a crossover with a pickup truck. The series model called Changan Nevo E07 debuted at the beginning of 2024, extensively reproducing the concept of the study. The front fascia was distinguished by a narrow light strip connecting rectangular headlights with characteristic teardrops, as well as a muscular hood and generous wheel arches.

The gently sloping roofline is smoothly combined with the unusually designed rear, which combines elements of a large transport compartment typical of pickup with glazed and sliding panels covering the upper and rear parts. The lower part of the trunk lid opens downwards, again borrowing from traditional pickup.

Following the prototype from 2023, the vehicle has a minimalistically arranged, 5-seater interior with a high center tunnel, a two-spoke steering wheel and a central touchscreen for the multimedia system.

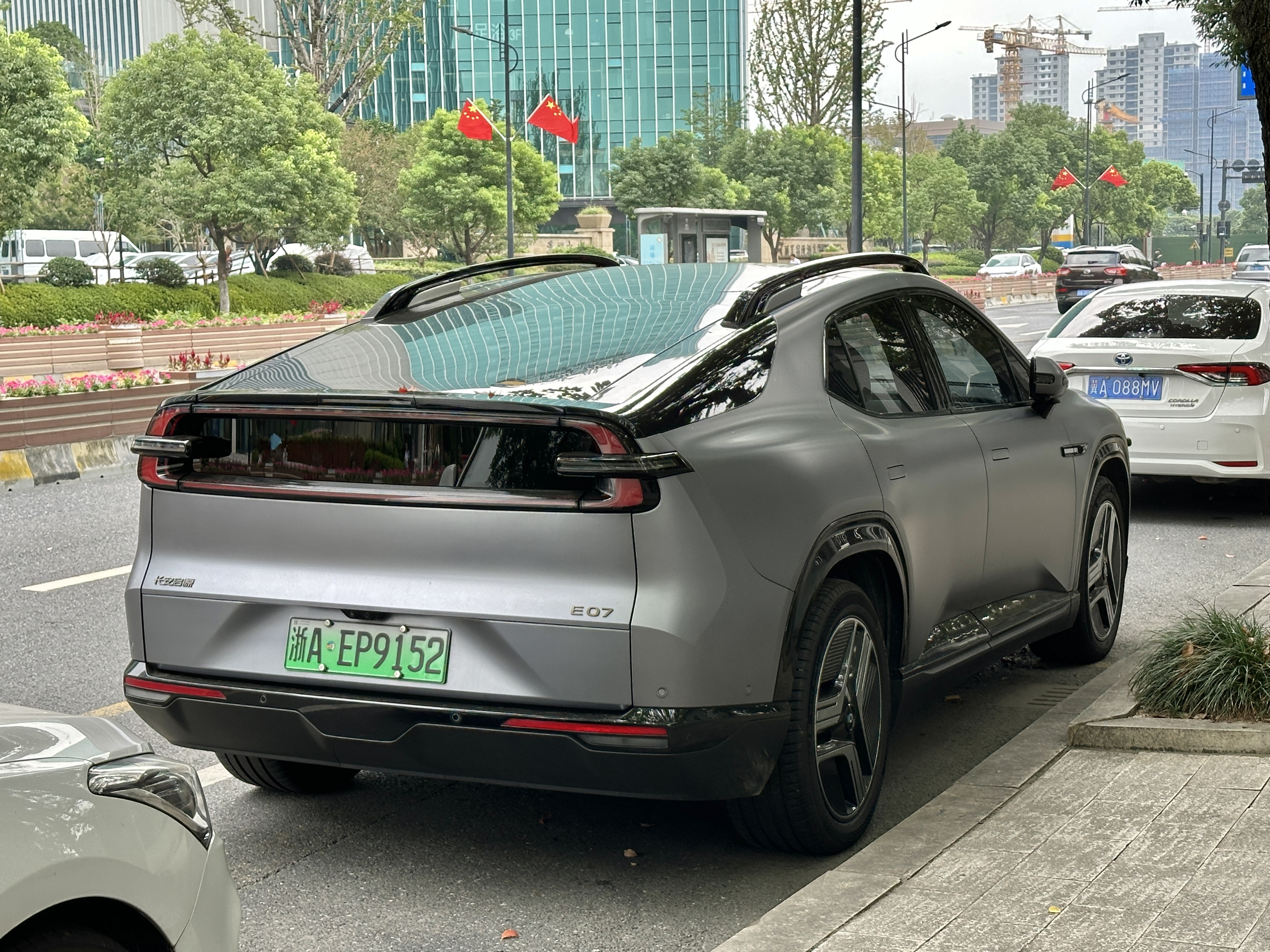
Rear view

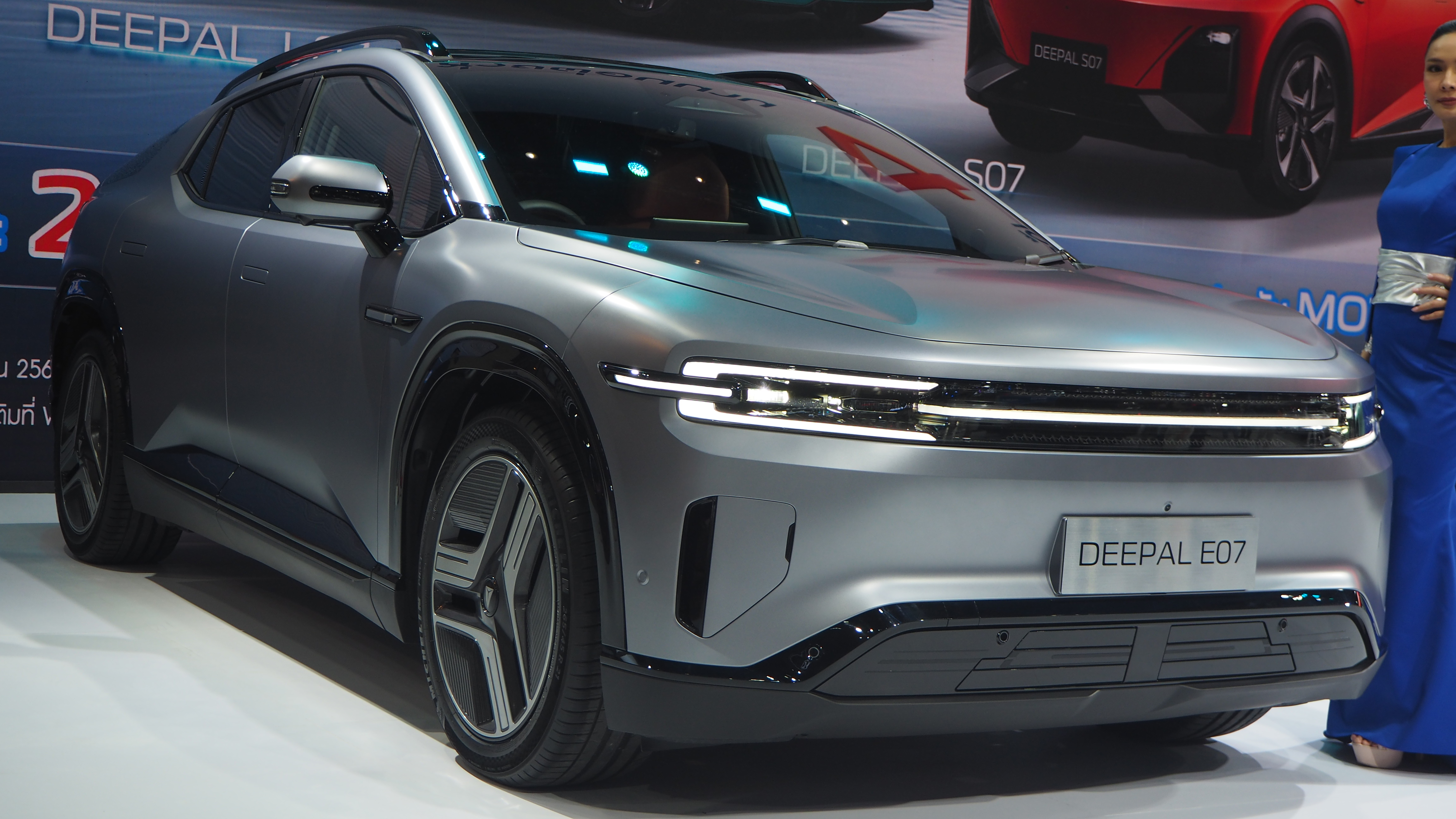
Deepal E07

== Markets ==
=== Australia ===
The Deepal E07 was launched in Australia on 9 September 2025, with two variants: RWD and AWD Performance. In March 2026 sales were halted due non-compliance of Australian Design Rules (ADR 34/03), with the rear middle seat missing an appropriate anchor points for a child seat. This recall was lifted in March 2026 with sales resumed.

=== Thailand ===
The Deepal E07 was launched in Thailand on 28 November 2024, with two variants: Plus RWD and Performance AWD, both variants powered by the 89.98 kWh battery pack.

== Specifications ==
The vehicle is a car designed exclusively for electric drive, available with one engine with a power of 252 kW (338 hp) or with two units with a total power of 440 kW (590 hp).

== Sales ==
| Year | China | | | Australia |
| Year | EV | EREV | Total | Australia |
|---|---|---|---|---|
| 2024 | 679 | 29 | 708Nevo | |
| 2025 | 619 | 255 | 874 | 194 |
