= Deepal S07 =

Mid-size crossover SUV

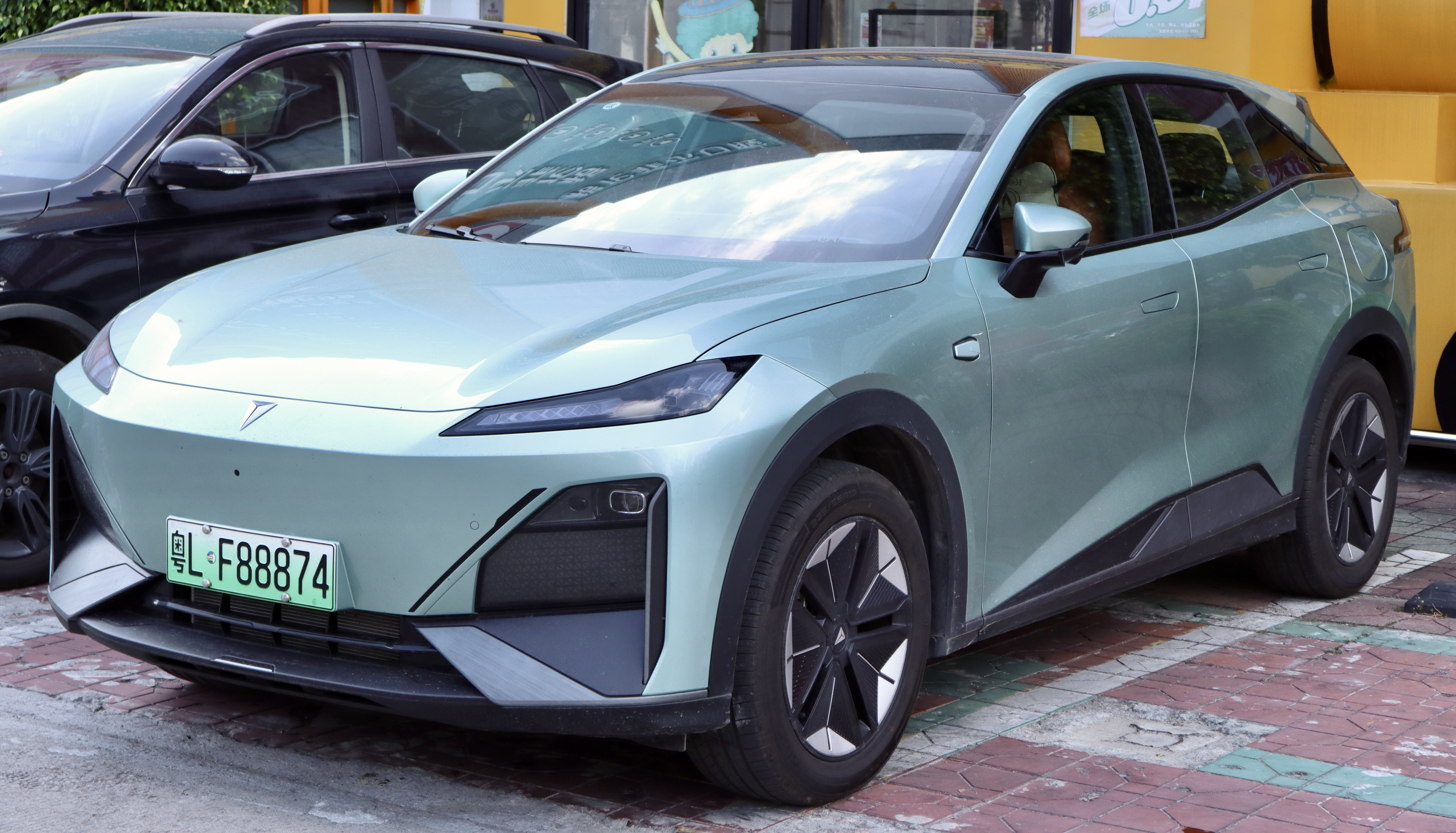

Overview
- Manufacturer: Deepal (Changan Automobile)
- Model code: C673
- Also called: Deepal S7 (2023–2024)
- Production: 2023–present
- Assembly: China: Nanjing
- Designer: Under the lead of Bertrand Bach

Body and chassis
- Class: Mid-size crossover SUV (D)
- Body style: 5-door SUV
- Layout: Rear-motor, rear-wheel-drive (EV); Front-engine, rear-motor, rear-wheel-drive (EREV)
- Platform: Changan EPA1 platform
- Related: Deepal SL03/L07; Mazda EZ-60/CX-6e

Powertrain
- Engine: Petrol range extender: 1.5 L JL473QJ I4
- Electric motor: AC induction, permanent magnet synchronous
- Power output: 218–258 hp (163–192 kW; 221–262 PS) (EV)
- Hybrid drivetrain: Range extender PHEV
- Battery: EREV; 18.4 kWh LFP CALB (Europe); 18.99 kWh LFP CALB; 31.73 kWh LFP CATL; 39.0 kWh LFP CATL; EV; 66.8 kWh NMC CALB; 68.8 kWh LFP CATL (Since 2024); 79.97 kWh NMC CALB
- Range: 1,120–1,280 km (696–795 mi) (CLTC)
- Electric range: 520–628 km (323–390 mi) (EV, CLTC); 90–210 km (56–130 mi) (EREV, CLTC)

Dimensions
- Wheelbase: 2,900 mm (114.2 in)
- Length: 4,750 mm (187.0 in)
- Width: 1,930 mm (76.0 in)
- Height: 1,625 mm (64.0 in)
- Curb weight: 1,895–2,035 kg (4,178–4,486 lb)

The Deepal S07 (Chinese: 深蓝S07; pinyin: Shēnlán S07, formerly Deepal S7 until 2024) is a mid-size crossover SUV produced by Deepal, the electric vehicle subsidiary of Chinese automotive company Changan Automobile since 2023. Changan has jointly developed the Deepal S07 with Huawei and CATL, and shares its platform with the previously launched Deepal L07. Production of the Deepal S07 started on 31 May 2023.

== Overview ==
The Deepal S07 was designed in Turin, Italy by a team led by design director Bertrand Bach and exterior design manager Georgios Koukos for exterior design, while the interior design was led by Jaromir Chech.

The design of the S07 was first leaked in 2022, back then it was known as the C673, which is also the S07's model code.

The Deepal S07 has a 12.3-inch HUD and a landscape-oriented central screen features the Huawei DriveONE program, the HarmonyOS infotainment system powered by Snapdragon 8155 chips, and batteries supplied by CATL.

The Deepal S07 is offered two versions, an EV and EREV. The EV version will be available with 218 hp (163 kW; 221 PS) or 258 hp (192 kW; 262 PS), while the EREV gets a 238 hp (177 kW; 241 PS) electric motor and a 95 hp (71 kW; 96 PS) 1.5-litre gasoline engine. The Deepal S07 EV has a CLTC range of 520 km (323 mi) or 620 km (385 mi) for the long range variant. The EREV version has two battery options, supporting a 121 km (75 mi) range, and a 200 km (124 mi) of CLTC range respectively. The fuel consumption of the S07 EREV is 4.95 L/100 km. The drag coefficient of the Deepal S07 is 0.258 C_{d} and 0–100 km/h (62 mph) acceleration is within 6.7 seconds.

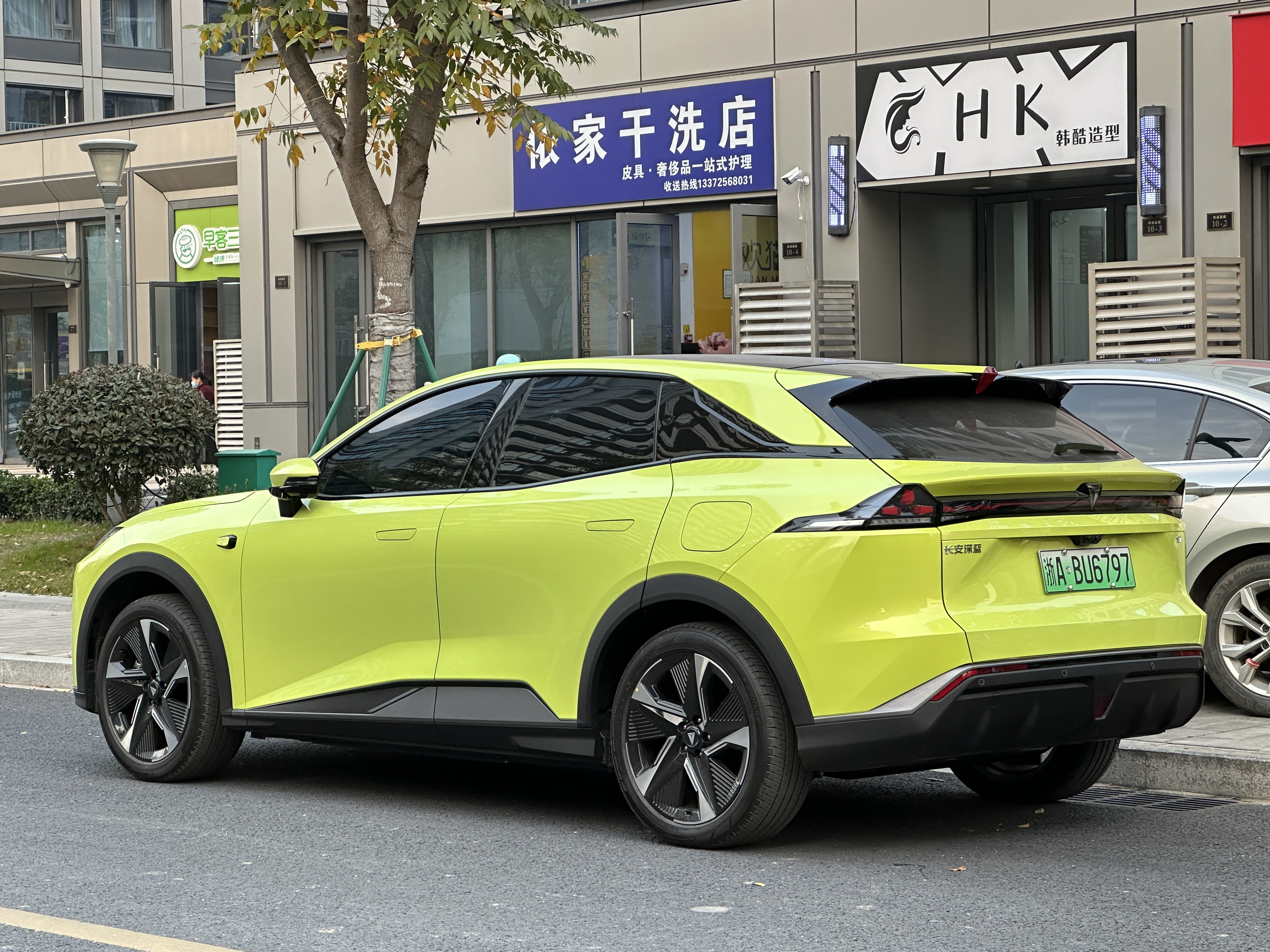
Rear view

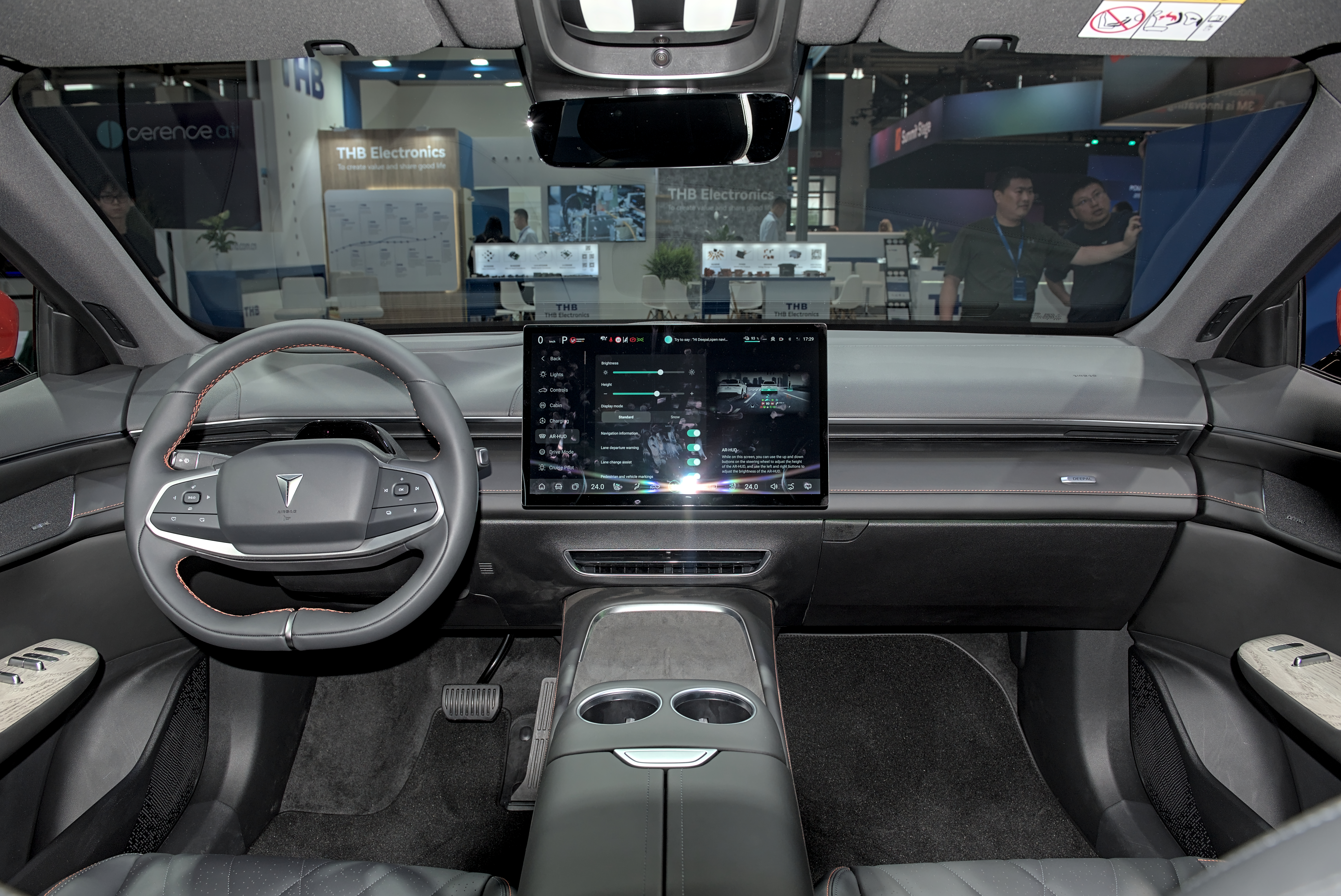
Interior

=== 2024 facelift ===
In July 2024, Deepal announced the release of the 2024 facelifted model and renamed it to Deepal S07. It is equipped with the Huawei's "Qiankun Smart Driving" ADS SE autonomous driving system, which uses the visual solution to achieve intelligent assisted driving. It can realize intelligent assisted driving in scenarios such as highways and urban expressways. Its capabilities include lane change assist, obstacle avoidance, and parking assist in vertical/parallel/diagonal parking spots.

The EREV powertrain system still uses a 1.5-litre engine (JL473QJ) as a range extender that outputs a maximum power of 70 kW (94 hp; 95 PS), paired with a 175 kW (235 hp; 238 PS) electric motor and a 39.05 kWh ShenXing battery pack from CATL, offering two pure electric cruising range options of 215 km (134 mi) and 285 km (177 mi). The EV variant is equipped with a 160 kW (215 hp; 218 PS) electric motor. Under fast charging, the battery can be charged from 30% to 80% in 15 minutes.

== Markets ==
=== Australia ===
The S07 was launched in Australia on 8 November 2024, as part of Deepal's entry in the Australian market. It is available in the sole unnamed variant powered by the 79.97 kWh battery pack.

=== Brunei ===
The S07 has been launched in Brunei alongside the S05 REEV on 21 December 2025. It is available in the sole Long Range variant powered by the 79.97 kWh battery pack and 570 km of range.

=== Indonesia ===
The S07 was launched in Indonesia on 21 November 2025 at the 2025 Gaikindo Jakarta Auto Week, as one of Changan's first models sold in Indonesia. It is available in the sole unnamed variant powered by the 79.97 kWh battery pack.

=== Mexico ===
The S07 went on sale in Mexico on 29 August 2024, as part of Deepal's entry in the Mexican market. It is available with two variants: REEV and BEV (79.97 kWh).

=== South Africa ===
The S07 was launched in South Africa on 30 October 2025, as part of Deepal's entry in the South African market. It is available in the sole variant powered by the 79.97 kWh battery pack.

=== Thailand ===
The S07 was launched in Thailand on 29 November 2023, alongside the L07 as part of Deepal's entry in the Thai market. At launch, it was available in the sole unnamed variant powered by the 66.8 kWh battery pack. The L (Long Range) variant powered by the 79.97 kWh battery pack was introduced in March 2024.

The New S07 Release in Thailand 20 October 2025 with new size LFP battery pack 68.8 kWh from CATL 30–80% Fast charge in 15 min.

== Safety ==
Euro NCAP test results Deepal S07, Base level (LHD) (2024)
Test	Points	%
Overall:	5 /5 stars	
Adult occupant:	38	95%
Child occupant:	43	87%
Pedestrian:	47.2	74%
Safety assist:	13.9	77%

C-NCAP (2021) test results 2023 Deepal S7 520 Max (EV)
Category		%
Overall:	5 /5 stars	88.3%
Occupant protection:		91.26%
Vulnerable road users:		69.35%
Active safety:		92.51%

ANCAP test results Deepal S07 (2024, aligned with Euro NCAP)
Test	Points	%
Overall:	5 /5 stars	
Adult occupant:	38.03	95%
Child occupant:	42.62	86%
Pedestrian:	47.21	74%
Safety assist:	14.06	78%

== Sales ==
Year	China			Thailand	Australia	Mexico		
Year	EV	EREV	Total	Thailand	Australia	EV	EREV	Total
2023	6,625	54,171	60,796		—	—	—	
2024	28,533	85,810	114,343	4,874				
2025	18,689	39,996	58,685	4,516	287	121	543	664
