= Deepal SL03 =

Electric mid-size sedan

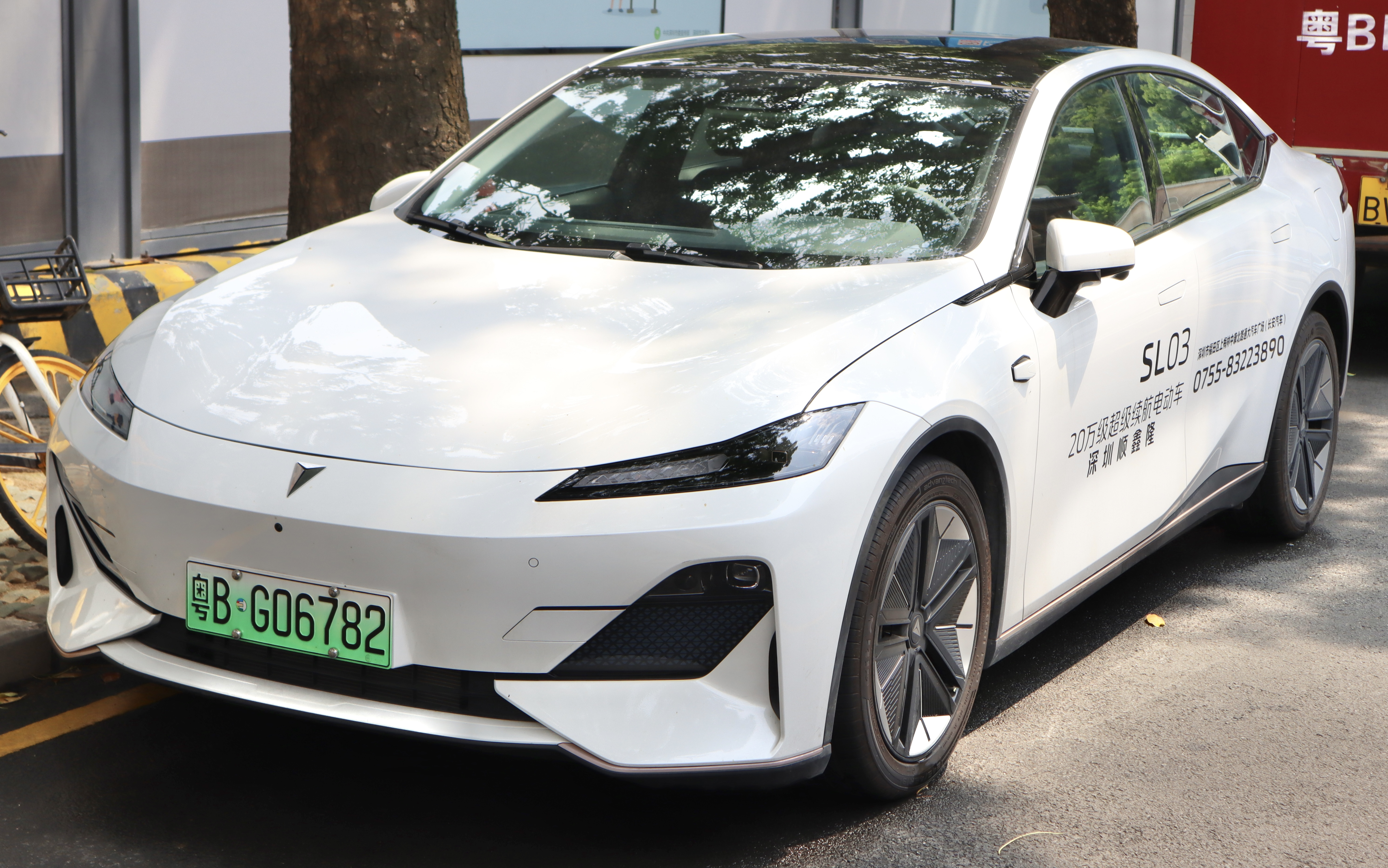
- 2023 Deepal SL03

Overview
- Manufacturer: Deepal (Changan Automobile)
- Model code: C385
- Also called: Deepal L07 (2024–present)
- Production: 2022–present
- Assembly: China: Chongqing

Body and chassis
- Class: Mid-size car (D)
- Body style: 5-door liftback
- Layout: Rear-motor, rear-wheel-drive (EV); Front-engine, rear-motor, rear-wheel-drive (EREV)
- Platform: Changan EPA1
- Related: Changan Nevo A07; Mazda EZ-6/6e

Powertrain
- Engine: Petrol range extender: 1.5 L JL473QJ I4; 1.5 L JL469Q1 I4
- Electric motor: Huawei DriveONE XTDM16, XTDM33, XTDM67 permanent magnet synchronous
- Hybrid drivetrain: Range extender
- Battery: 18.99 kWh NMC CALB; 28.39 kWh LFP CATL; 35.1 kWh LFP CATL; 56.1 kWh LFP CATL; 58.1 kWh LFP CALB; 58.89 kWh LFP CALB (Thailand); 62.82 kWh LFP CATL; 66.8 kWh NMC CALB (Thailand); 79.97 kWh NMC CALB
- Range: 1,200–1,500 km (750–930 mi) (EREV)
- Electric range: 135–240 km (84–149 mi) (EREV); 200 km (124 mi) (FCEV); 515–705 km (320–438 mi) (EV)

Dimensions
- Wheelbase: 2,900 mm (114.2 in)
- Length: 4,820 mm (189.8 in); 4,875 mm (191.9 in) (L07)
- Width: 1,890 mm (74.4 in)
- Height: 1,480 mm (58.3 in)
- Curb weight: 1,725–1,920 kg (3,803–4,233 lb)

The Deepal SL03 (Chinese: 深蓝SL03; pinyin: Shēnlán SL03) is a mid-size sedan produced by Deepal, the electric vehicle subsidiary of Chinese automotive company Changan Automobile since 2022.

A sister model known as the Deepal L07 equipped with Huawei technologies is sold alongside the SL03 since 2024.

== Overview ==
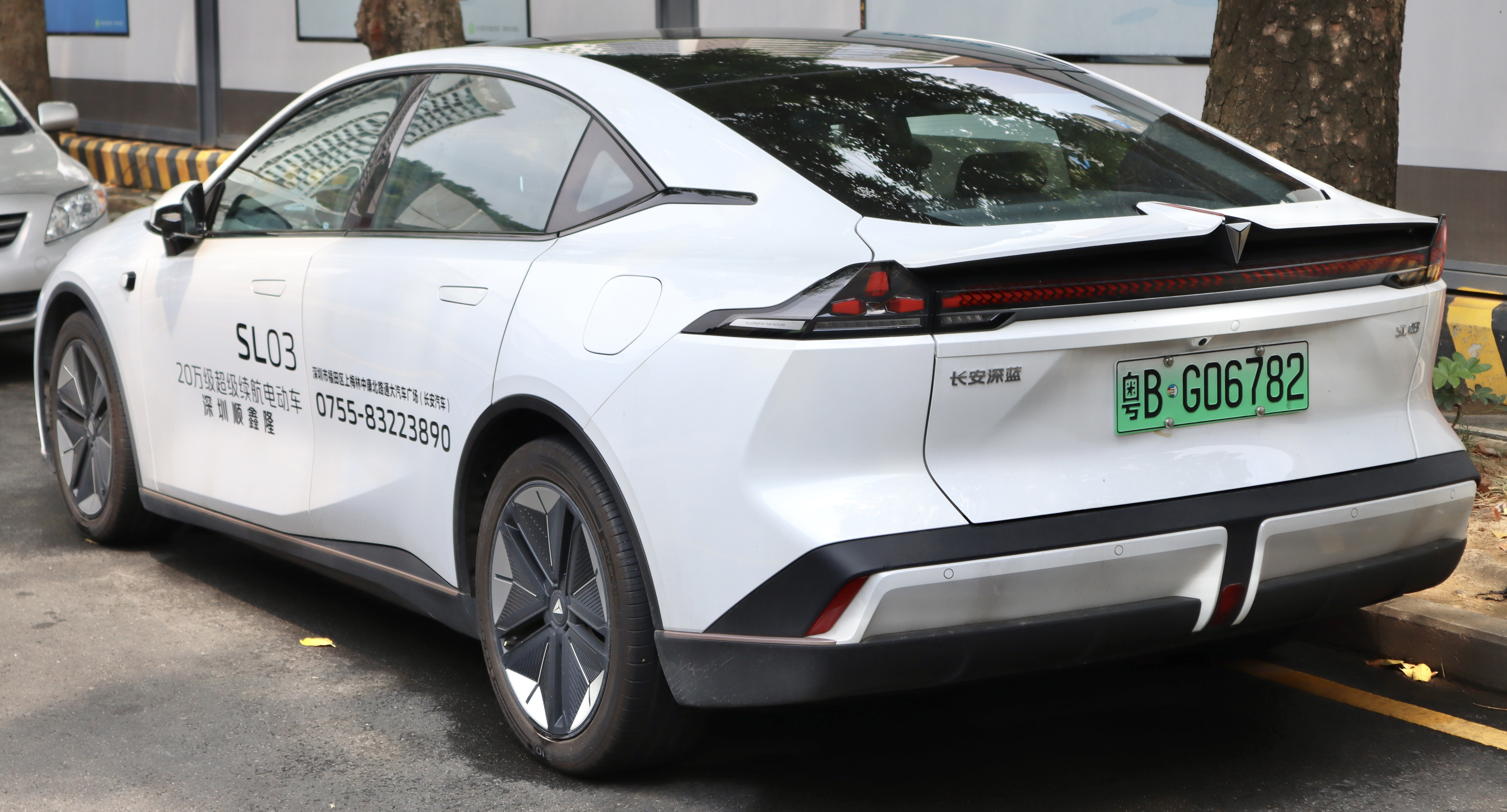
Rear view

The Deepal SL03 liftback sedan is offered in three options, a battery electric vehicle, a series hybrid, and an electric vehicle with a hydrogen electrochemical generator.

The battery electric version has a single electric motor that makes 218 horsepower (163 kW; 221 PS) and has a range of up to 700 kilometres (435 mi) with a 56.12 kWh LFP battery made by CATL, while the extended range EREV variant has a naturally aspirated 1.5-litre JL473QJ petrol generator and an electric motor that produce 258 horsepower (192 kW; 262 PS) with a range of up to 1,200 kilometres (746 mi) supported by a ternary (NMC) battery made by Changan New Energy. Changan claims that the SL03 has a sharp exterior design that allows for a drag coefficient of 0.230. The energy consumption of the pure electric SL03 is 12.3 kWh/100 km.

The Deepal SL03 is equipped with 27 different sensors and level-4 autonomous driving support co-developed with Huawei. With a SA8155P Automotive Development Platform computer chip for computers from Qualcomm that power the autonomous driving systems.

== Deepal L07 ==
In September 2024, Deepal introduced a lightly modified version of the SL03 called the L07 which features Huawei's technology suite. Deepal positions as a tech focused sister model to be sold alongside the sportier SL03, rather than a facelift or replacement. It is the second Deepal model after the S07 which is equipped with Huawei's vision-based Qiankun ADS SE autonomous driving system.

Compared to the SL03, the exterior features minimal changes and the powertrains are similar with EV and EREV options. In the interior, the digital instrument display is replaced by a 55-inch AR-HUD, and features a 15°-tilting 2.5K-resolution 15.6-inch central infotainment touchscreen running Deepal OS software on a Snapdragon 8155 SoC. It uses the LiDAR-less Huawei Qiankun ADS SE system, which has a sensor suite with 3 mmWave radars, 10 cameras, and 12 ultrasonic sensors while supporting features such as automatic emergency braking, lane change assist, and obstacle avoidance.

The L07 is available in both a pure electric or range-extender powertrains, both rear-wheel drive. The pure electric version uses a 185 kW (248 hp; 252 PS) XTDM33 motor and a CATL-supplied 56.1 kWh LFP battery pack providing 530 km (329 mi) of CLTC range. The range extender version uses a 190 kW (255 hp; 258 PS) XTDM16 motor paired with either 28.4 or 35.1kWh LFP CATL-supplied batteries providing 230 km (143 mi) and 300 km (186 mi) of electric range, respectively. They are also equipped with a 1.5-liter port-injected four-cylinder petrol engine outputting 72 kW (97 hp; 98 PS), extending range up to 1,400 km (870 mi). All battery options support 3C charge rates, for a 30–80% charge time of 15 minutes.

Specifications
Variant	Model year	Battery	Motor	Power	Torque	Range				30–80% charge time	0–100 km/h (62 mph)	Top speed	Weight	
Variant	Model year	Battery	Motor	Power	Torque	Electric-only				30–80% charge time	0–100 km/h (62 mph)	Top speed	Weight	Total
Variant	Model year	Battery	Motor	Power	Torque	WLTP	NEDC	CLTC		30–80% charge time	0–100 km/h (62 mph)	Top speed	Weight	
EREV	2026-	28.4 kWh LFP CATL	XTDM67 & JL469Q1	175 kW (235 hp; 238 PS)	290 N⋅m (214 lb⋅ft)	175 km (109 mi)	—	240 km (149 mi)	1,500 km (932 mi)	15 min	7.4 s	185 km/h (115 mph)	1,835 kg (4,045 lb)	
EREV	2025	28.4 kWh LFP CATL	XTDM16 & JL469Q1	160 kW (215 hp; 218 PS)	320 N⋅m (236 lb⋅ft)	170 km (106 mi)	—	230 km (143 mi)	1,330 km (826 mi)	15 min	7.5 s	175 km/h (109 mph)	1,865 kg (4,112 lb)	
EREV	2025	35.1 kWh CATL	XTDM16 & JL469Q1	190 kW (255 hp; 258 PS)	320 N⋅m (236 lb⋅ft)	220 km (137 mi)	—	300 km (186 mi)	1,400 km (870 mi)	15 min	6.8 s	175 km/h (109 mph)	1,920 kg (4,233 lb)	
EV	2024-25	56.1 kWh LFP CATL	XTDM33	185 kW (248 hp; 252 PS)	310 N⋅m (229 lb⋅ft)	—	—	530 km (329 mi)		15 min	6.2 s	170 km/h (106 mph)	1,825 kg (4,023 lb)	
EV	2024-Present (L07 S; Outside China)	58.89 kWh LFP CALB	XTDM33	160 kW (215 hp; 218 PS)	320 N⋅m (236 lb⋅ft)	—	475 km (295 mi)	—		15 min	6.2 s	170 km/h (106 mph)	1,825 kg (4,023 lb)	
EV	2024-Present (L07; Outside China)	66.8 kWh NMC CALB	XTDM33	190 kW (255 hp; 258 PS)	320 N⋅m (236 lb⋅ft)	—	540 km (336 mi)	—		15 min	6.2 s	170 km/h (106 mph)	1,825 kg (4,023 lb)	
EV	2026	56.12 kWh LFP CATL	XTDM67	200 kW (268 hp; 272 PS)	290 N⋅m (214 lb⋅ft)	—	460 km (286 mi)	550 km (342 mi)		15 min	6.2 s	180 km/h (112 mph)	1,820 kg (4,012 lb)	
EV	2026	62.8 kWh LFP CATL	XTDM67	200 kW (268 hp; 272 PS)	290 N⋅m (214 lb⋅ft)	—	—	660 km (410 mi)		15 min	6.6 s	180 km/h (112 mph)	1,890 kg (4,167 lb)	

=== 2026 update ===
On 13 August 2025, Deepal launched the 2026 model year update for the L07. The infotainment system has been upgraded to use the Snapdragon 8295 SoC, while continuing to use Deepal's own DeepalOS 4.0 software, and the steering wheel controls have been tweaked. The ADAS system has been updated to Huawei Qiankun ADS 4.0 SE and is now standard on all models. Both the pure electric and range extender models now use a new 200 kW (268 hp; 272 PS) XTDM67 motor. Range of the existing 28.4 and 56.1 kWh packs have increased to 240 km (149 mi) and 550 km (342 mi), respectively, while the larger 35.1 kWh EREV pack has been dropped. Additionally, a new larger 68.82 kWh LFP pack option has been added with 660 km (410 mi) of CLTC range.

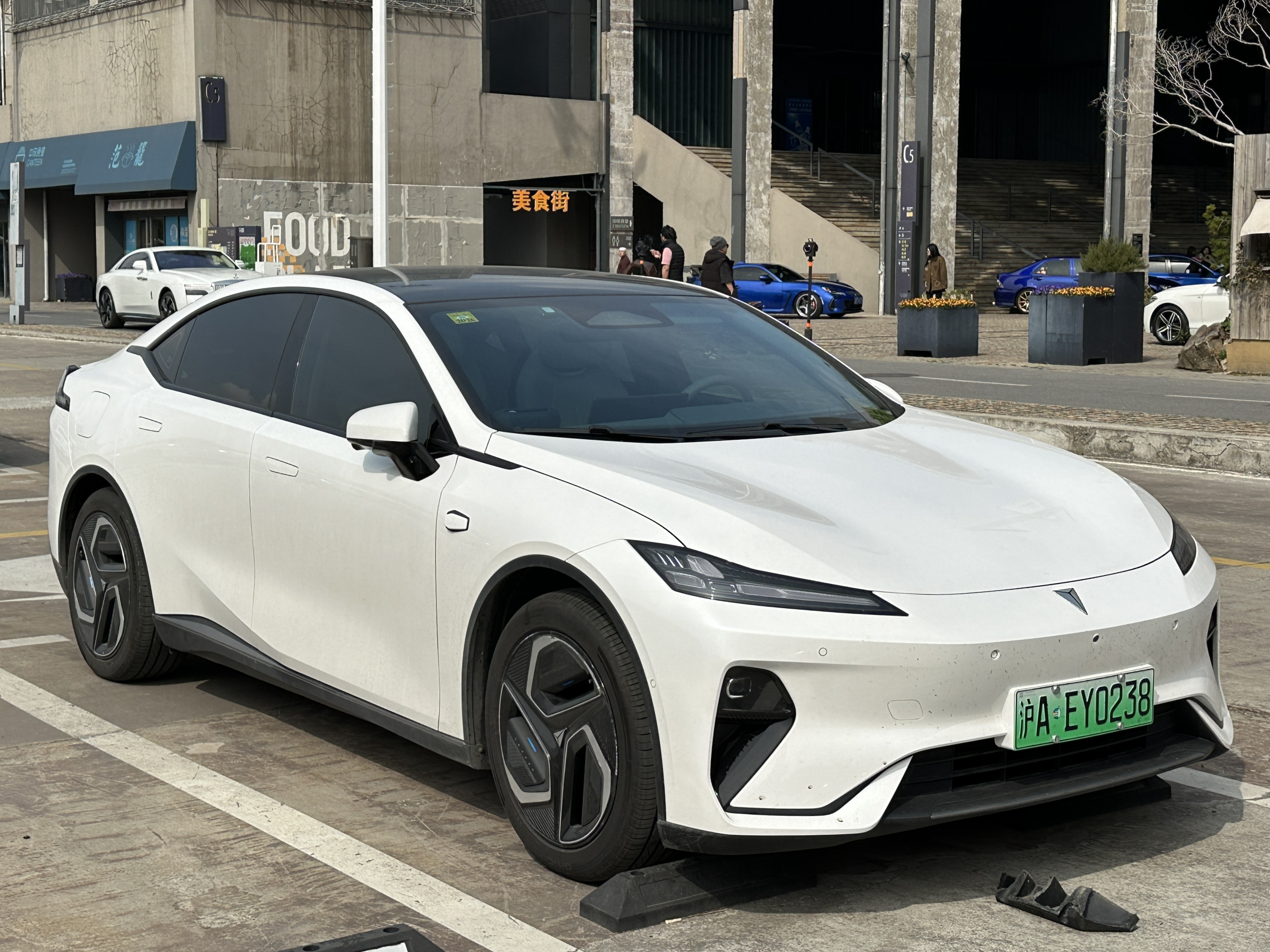
Deepal L07 (facelift)

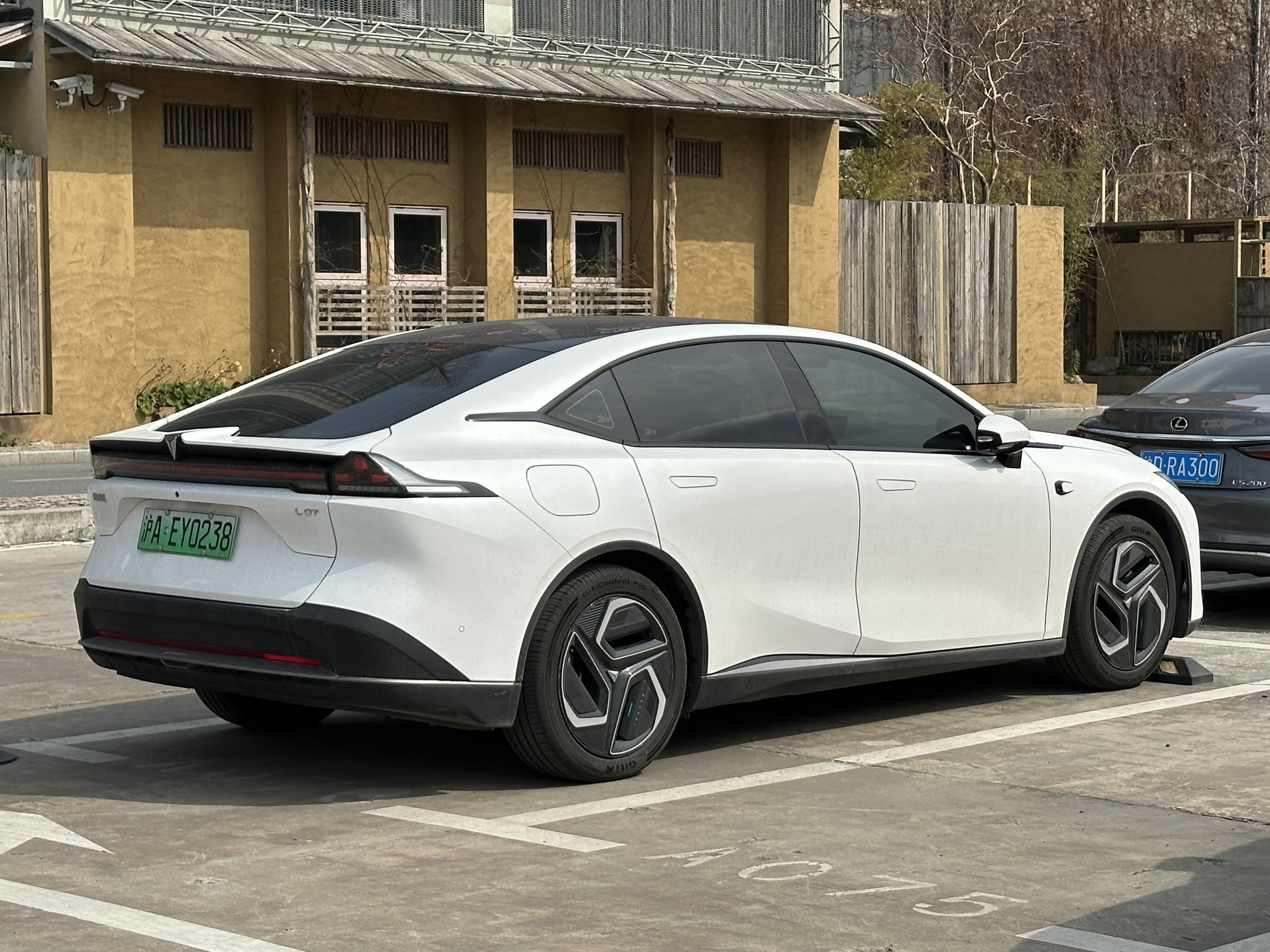
Deepal L07 (facelift) rear view

== Markets ==
=== Thailand ===
The SL03 was launched in Thailand as the L07 on 29 November 2023, alongside the S07 as part of Deepal's entry in the Thai market. Despite its name, the model is not the Chinese market L07 that features Huawei technology and a changed interior. At launch, it is available in the sole unnamed variant powered by the 66.8 kWh NMC battery pack. The entry-level S variant powered by the 58.89 kWh LFP battery pack was introduced in March 2024.

== Sales ==
Year	China						Thailand
Year	SL03			L07			L07
Year	EV	EREV	Total	EV	EREV	Total	L07
2023	13,045	55,024	68,069	—			
2024	17,522	37,322	54,844	4,927	11,127	16,054	743
2025	13,637	4,914	18,551	11,394	14,232	25,626	
