= DT =

DT may refer to:

== Arts ==
=== Music ===
- "D.T.", an instrumental song on Who Made Who, AC/DC's 1986 album
- Dark Tranquillity, Swedish melodic death metal band
- Dream Theater, American progressive metal band
- MC DT, a UK garage emcee and member of DJ Pied Piper and the Masters of Ceremonies

=== Other media ===
- The Dark Tower (disambiguation), various works of fiction
- Dilithium (Star Trek), fictional chemical element by its symbol
- Ixion Saga DT, a television series
- An abbreviation for documentary theatre

== Businesses and organisations ==
- Daimler Truck, German commercial vehicle manufacturer
- Dalarnas Tidningar, Swedish newspaper and media company
- Deutsche Telekom (by NYSE ticker symbol)
- Dhanmondi Tutorial, an educational organisation
- Dimosia Tileorasi, a former Greek public broadcaster
- DT Infrastructure, Australian construction company
- Dynatrace, software intelligence provider (by NYSE stock symbol)
- TAAG Angola Airlines (IATA code: DT)
- Turkish State Theatres (Turkish: Devlet Tiyattolari)

== Language and linguistics ==
- d/t, shorthand for "due to"
- Discourse transcription, in linguistics
- Daighi tongiong pingim, an orthography in the Latin alphabet for Taiwanese language

== People ==
- Nickname for Demaryius Thomas (1987–2021), American football player
- Nickname for Derrick Thomas (1967–2000), American football player
- Nickname for Donald Trump (born 1946), American businessman and president of the United States
- Nickname for Israel Del Toro (born 1975), American motivational speaker and former Air Force sergeant

== Places ==
- District, in abbreviations
- Downtown, in abbreviations
- Dakota Territory, the northernmost part of the land acquired in the Louisiana Purchase
- DT postcode area, including Dorchester and surrounding areas in southern England

== Science and technology ==
=== Computing and telecommunications ===
- <dt></dt>, an HTML element for specifying definition data
- Daemon Tools, a disk image emulator
- Digital television, the transmission of television signals using digital encoding
- Digital transformation, the adoption of digital technology
- Decision tree, a decision support tool

=== Health and psychology ===
- DT vaccine, a diphtheria and tetanus vaccine
- Dark triad, a group of personality traits
- Delirium tremens, a medical condition of uncontrolled shaking, typically due to alcohol or drug withdrawal
- Drug Tariff price, the amount pharmacies in the United Kingdom get reimbursed for generic medications
- Digestive tract, the tract or passageway of the digestive system that leads from the mouth to the anus

=== Weapons ===
- Douglas DT, a U.S. Navy torpedo bomber
- DT, variant of the Degtyaryov machine gun for mounting and loading in armoured fighting vehicles

=== Other uses in science and technology ===
- DT, in nuclear fusion, the ratio of hydrogen isotopes deuterium and tritium
  - Deuterium–tritium fusion, a type of nuclear fusion
- Navistar DT engine
- ΔT (timekeeping), the time difference between Universal Time (UT, defined by Earth's rotation) and Terrestrial Time (TT, independent of Earth's rotation)
- Changan Eado DT, a Chinese subcompact sedan

== Other uses ==
- DT, latinised symbol for the Tunisian dinar
- Defensive tackle, a position in American football
- Design and technology, an area of study taught at schools and colleges
- Deuteronomy, the fifth book of the Hebrew Bible
- "Discus throw" athletics abbreviation in track and field
- Southeast Sulawesi (vehicle registration prefix DT)
- Tokyu's Den-en-toshi Line (railway line prefix DT)

== See also ==
- Delirium Tremens (disambiguation)
