= Delirium (disambiguation) =

Delirium is a common and severe neuropsychiatric syndrome.

Delirium may also refer to:

== Film ==
- Delirium (1972 film), a 1972 Italian thriller film
- Delirium (1979 film), a 1979 American thriller film
- Delirium (1987 film), a film by Lamberto Bava
- Delirium (2013 film), a film by Ihor Podolchak
- Delirium (2014 film), an Argentine film
- Delirium (2016 film), a film by Welsh director Gareth Jones
- Delirium (2018 film), a film by Dennis Iliadis

== Literature ==
- Delirium (Cooper novel), a 1998 Izzy Darlow novel by Douglas Anthony Cooper
- Delirium (Oliver novel), a 2011 novel by Lauren Oliver
- Delirium (Restrepo novel), a 2004 novel by Laura Restrepo
- Delirium (comics), a character in The Sandman

== Music ==
- Delirium (band), an Italian progressive rock band
- Delirium (Capercaillie album), 1991
- Delirium (Ellie Goulding album), 2015
- Delirium (Lacuna Coil album) and the title track, 2016
- Delirium (Sedes album), 1997
- Delirium (Wrathchild album), 1989
- "Delirium" (song), a 2004 song by Lena Philipsson
- "Delirium", a 1995 song by Onkel Tom Angelripper
- "Delirium", a 2003 song by Pink from her album Try This
- "Delirium", a 2026 song by Gorillaz from their album The Mountain
- Delerium, a Canadian band
- Delerium Records, an American record label

== Other ==
- Delirium (Cirque du Soleil), a Cirque du Soleil production
- Delirium (ride), an amusement ride at Kings Island
- Delirium (Kings Dominion), an amusement ride at Kings Dominion
- Delirium Tremens, the flagship beer of Huyghe Brewery
- Delirium Wilderness, Michigan, United States

== See also ==
- Delirium tremens
- Delirium Tremens (disambiguation)
- Delirious (disambiguation)
