= Changan Alsvin V3 =

Chinese subcompact sedan

Alsvin V3
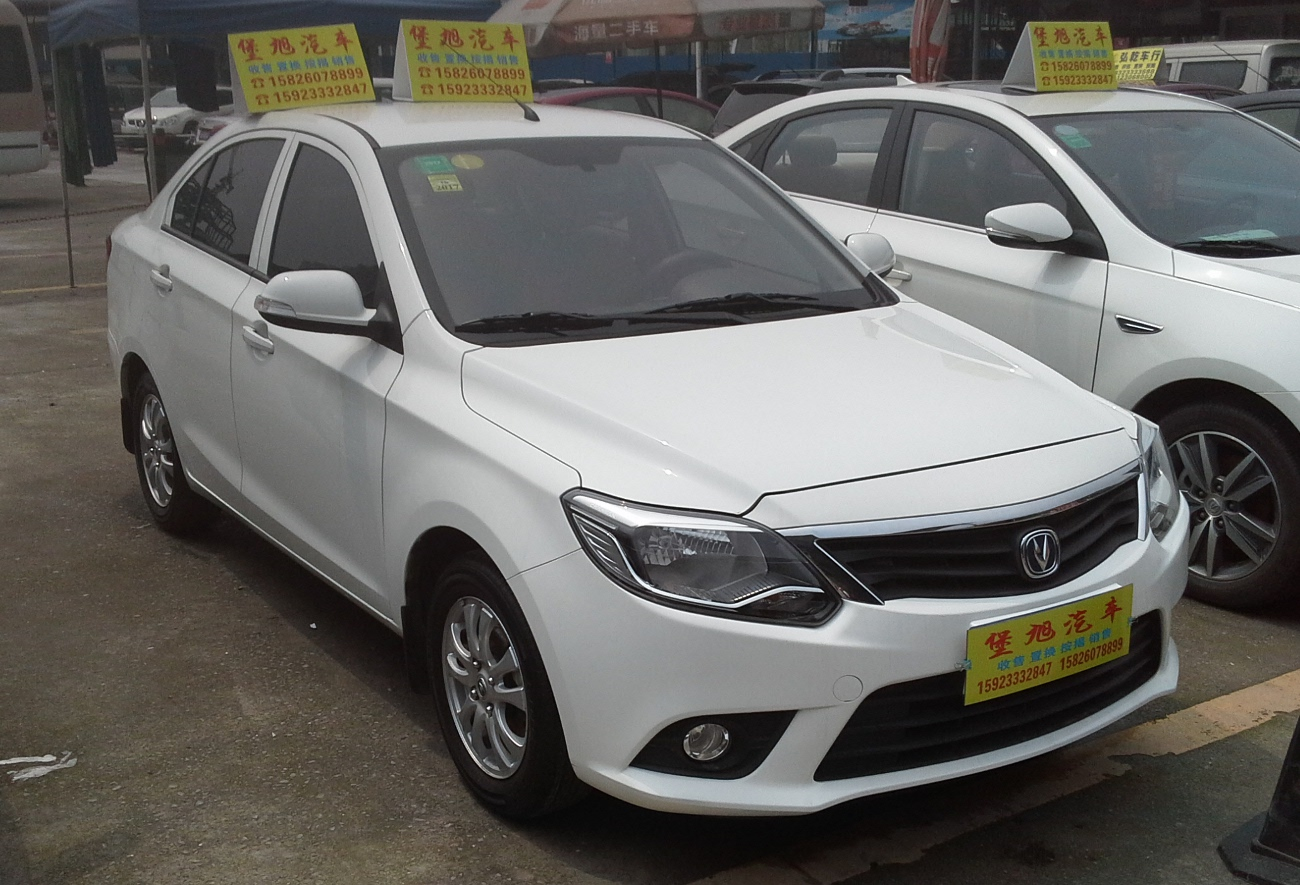

Overview
- Manufacturer: Changan
- Production: 2012–2017
- Model years: 2013–2017

Body and chassis
- Class: Subcompact car/Supermini (B)
- Body style: 4-door sedan
- Layout: Front-engine, front-wheel-drive

Powertrain
- Engine: 1.3 L I4; 1.4 L EA14 I4
- Transmission: 5-speed manual 5-speed automatic

Dimensions
- Wheelbase: 2,410 mm (94.9 in)
- Length: 4,180 mm (164.6 in)
- Width: 1,650 mm (65.0 in)
- Height: 1,465 mm (57.7 in)

Chronology
- Successor: Changan Eado DT

The Changan Alsvin V3 is a subcompact sedan produced by Chinese auto maker Changan Automobile.

== Overview ==
Previewed by the Changan B501 concept, the production version Alsvin V3 subcompact sedan debuted at the 2011 Guangzhou Auto Show. Later actually listed as the Alsvin 100 or Yuexiang 100, and finally with the confirmed name of Alsvin V3 when launched on to the market in June 2012. Price ranges from 43.900 to 48.900 yuan. The Changan Alsvin V3 is a subcompact sedan slightly smaller and positioned under the Changan Alsvin/Changan Alsvin V5 in the market, and is built on a different platform employing multi-link independent suspension in the rear. The Alsvin V3 is powered by a 1.3 liter inline-4 16V DOHC engine producing 69kW and 121Nm with a 5-speed manual transmission as the only gearbox option.

Deliveries of the Alsvin V3 started on June 20, 2012. In 2013, 76,858 units were sold and 70,143 deliveries were made in 2014.

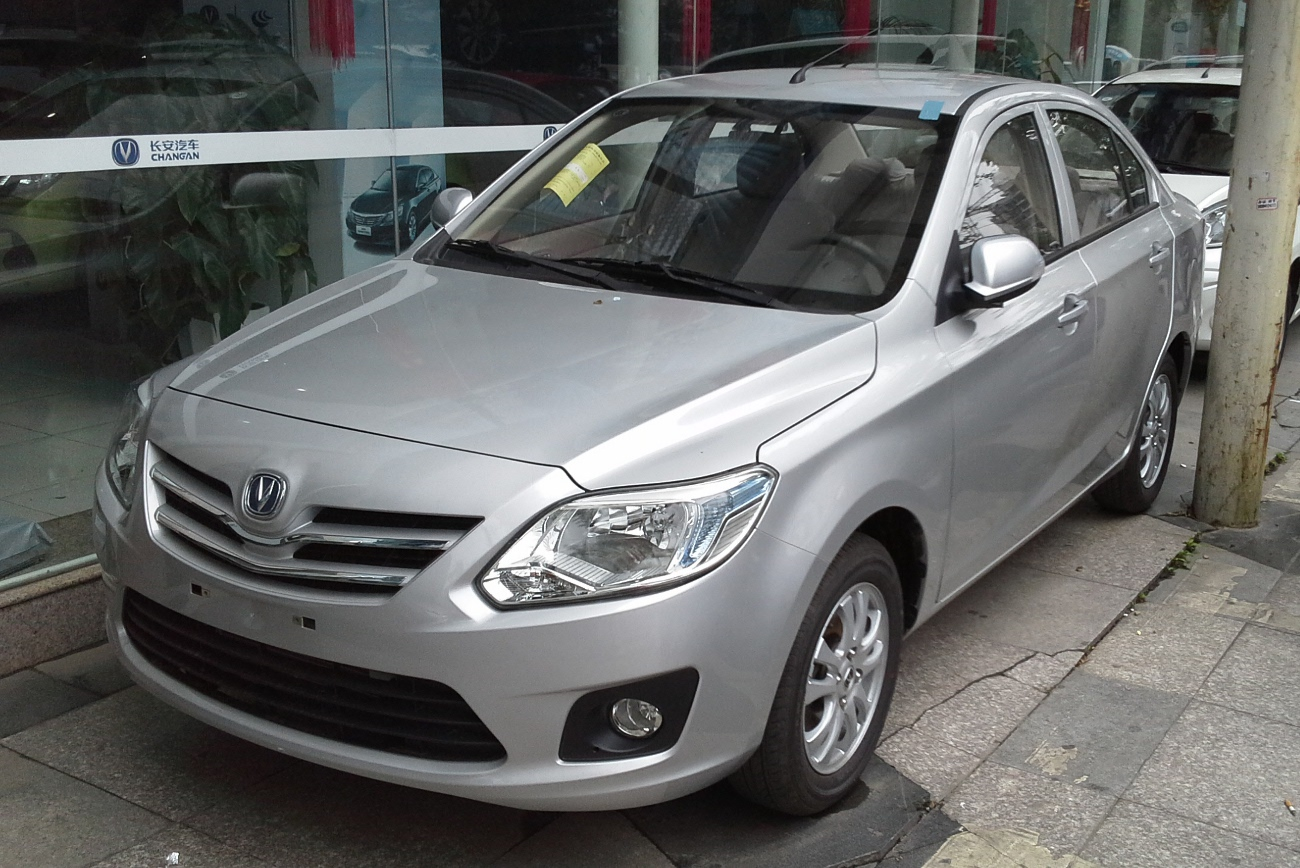
Front view of the pre-facelift Changan Alsvin V3.

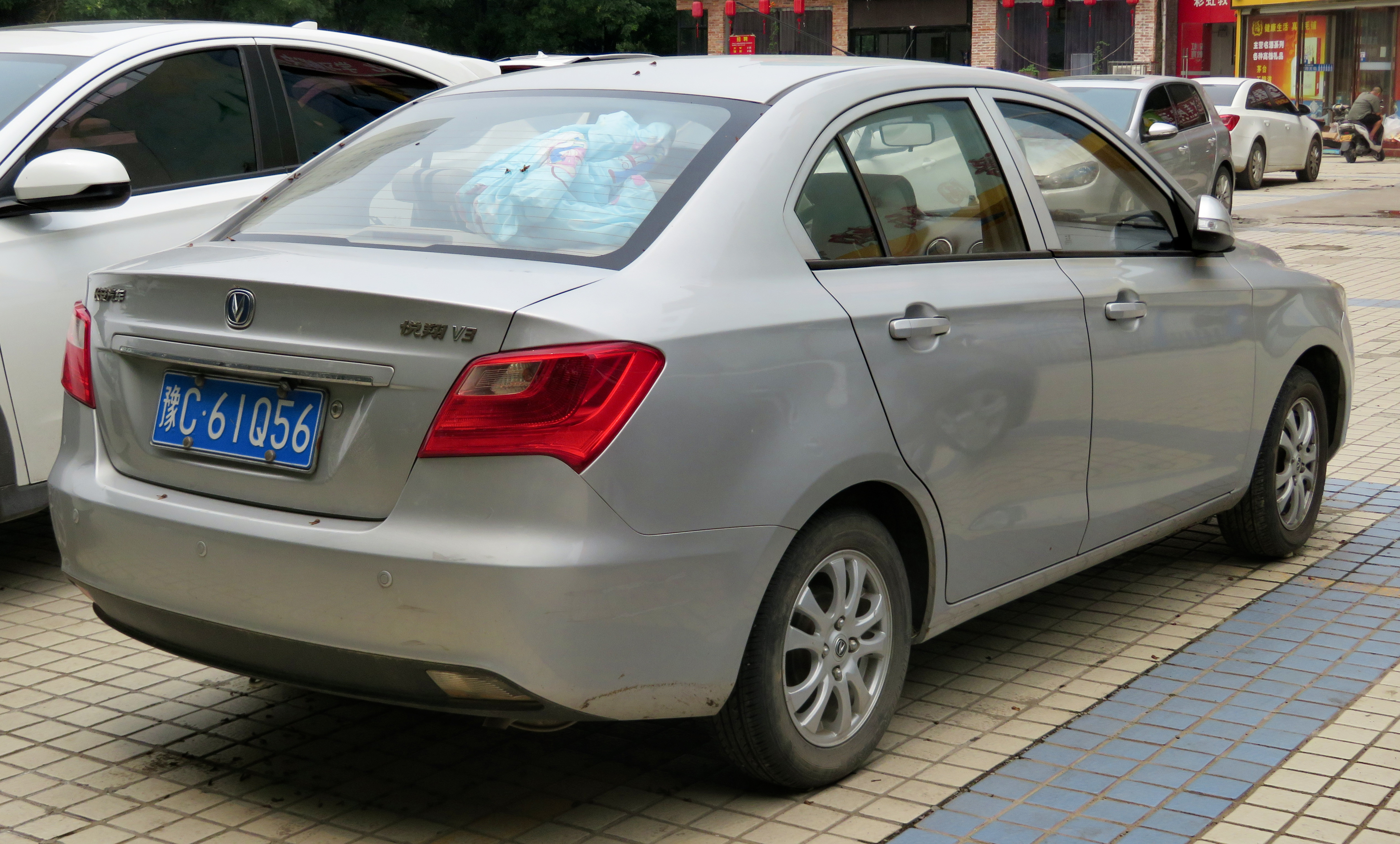
Rear view of the pre-facelift Changan Alsvin V3.

=== Facelift ===
A facelift debuted on the 2014 Guangzhou Auto Show with a launch on the Chinese car market at Q1 2015. The facelift focuses on the front with a new grille similar to the ones on the Alsvin V7. The post-facelift model adds a 1.4 liter EA14 inline-four engine and a 5-speed automatic transmission as additional options.

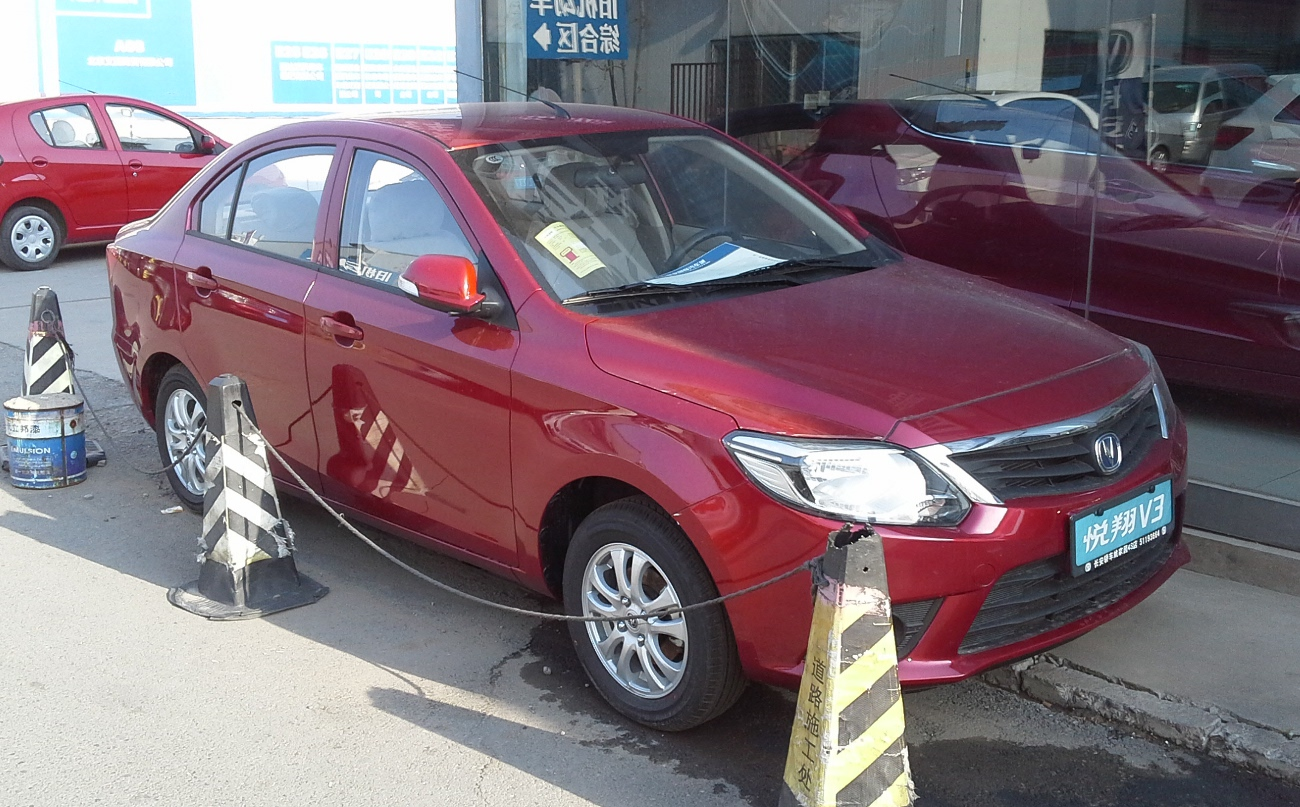
Front view of the post-facelift Changan Alsvin V3.

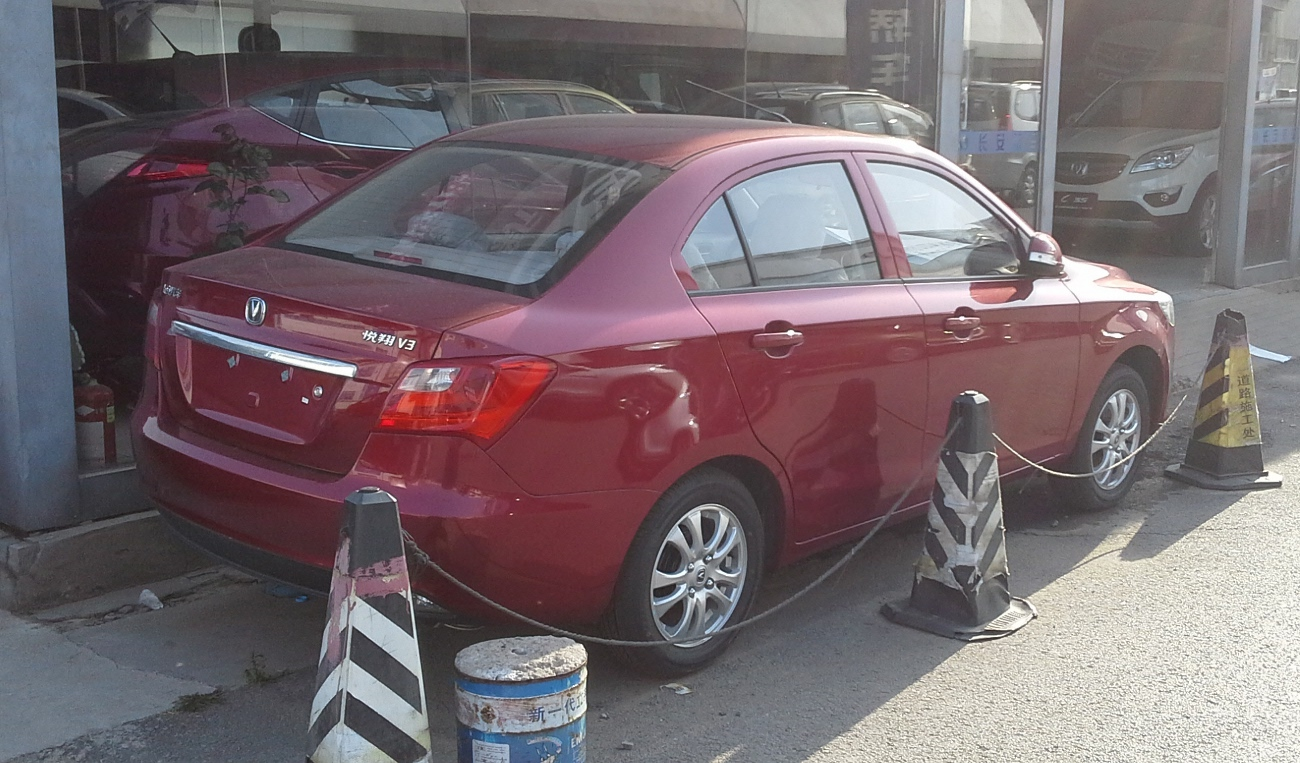
Rear view of the post-facelift Changan Alsvin V3.
