= USDT =

USDT may refer to:

- USDT, a ticker symbol for the Tether stablecoin cryptocurrency
- United States Department of the Treasury
- Ultra-slim desktop, a computer formfactor used by Hewlett-Packard, see HP business desktops
- University of Science and Defense Technologies, an Iranian research institute of the Malek-Ashtar University of Technology
- Tazovsky Airport (ICAO airport code: USDT), in Tazovsky, Tazovsky District, Yamalo-Nenets Autonomous Okrug, Russia

== See also ==
- DT (disambiguation)
