= Eado =

Eado may refer to:

- Changan Eado, a 2012–present Chinese compact car
- Changan Eado DT, a 2018–present Chinese subcompact sedan
- East Downtown Houston (abbreviated as EaDo), a district in Houston, Texas, United States
- EaDo/Stadium station, a METRORail station in Houston, Texas, United States
