= Master Motors =

Pakistani bus and truck manufacturer

Master Motors Corporation Ltd.
- Type: Corporation
- Industry: Automotive
- Founded: 2002; 24 years ago
- Headquarters: Karachi, Pakistan
- Products: Truck, Bus, Car
- Parent: Master Group
- Website: mmcl.com.pk

Master Motors is a Pakistani bus and truck manufacturer, based in Karachi, Pakistan since 2002. Master Motors is the authorized assembler and manufacturer of Changan, Chery, Daimler Fuso, Foton, Iveco Trucks and Yutong vehicles in Pakistan.

Master Motors is made an agreement with Chinese automobile company Changan Automobile after awarded Greenfield status by Ministry of Industries and Production.

Master Motors is also assembling Italian Iveco Trucks in Pakistan starting from mid 2019.

== History ==
Changan and Master Motors have set up an automobile manufacturing plant in Karachi. The venture saw a total investment of $100 million by the end of 2018. Master Motors injected 70% while the remaining amount came from the Chinese company.

In 2023, Master Changan Motors Ltd became the first company in Pakistan to export vehicles internationally.

== Operations in Pakistan ==
In 2023, Foton International Trade Co Ltd signed an MOU with Master Motor Corporation (Pvt.) Limited to invest in a joint venture. MMCL had been manufacturing and selling Foton brand vehicles since 2003 under a technical licensing agreement. During Prime Minister Imran Khan's visit to Beijing for the Belt and Road initiative, he visited the plant of Beiqi Foton and acknowledged MMCL's successful sales of over 17,000 commercial vehicles in the past.

The company achieved significant growth in the past year despite tough competition in the market. The sales figures consistently reflected the trust of Pakistani consumers in their products. With these efforts, Master Motors remained a major player in the Pakistani automobile industry.

== Assembled brands ==
=== Changan ===
- Changan Alsvin (Subcompact Sedan)
- Changan Oshan X7 (Mid-size SUV)
- Changan Karvaan (Light van)
- Changan M9 Sherpa (Light truck)

=== Chery ===
- Chery Tiggo 7 (Compact crossover SUV)
- Chery Tiggo 8 (Mid-size crossover SUV)
- Chery Tiggo 9 (Mid-size crossover SUV)

=== Daimler Fuso ===
- Fuso Canter Bus (Mini bus)
- Fuso Canter EURO-II (Light truck)
- Fuso FM (Medium-Heavy truck)
- Fuso FN (Medium-Heavy truck)

=== Foton ===
- Foton View C2/CS2 (Light van)
- Foton Aumark MP M280 (Light truck)
- Foton Aumark M290-T (Light truck)
- Foton Auman EST 220HP (Medium truck)
- Foton Auman 430HP (Heavy truck)

=== Yutong ===
- Yutong-Master NOVA (ZK6138HP) (Intercity luxury coach)
- Yutong-Master Grandiose (ZK6147H) (Intercity luxury coach)
- Yutong-Master GRAND TOURIST (ZK6127HSP) (Intercity luxury coach)
- Yutong-Master GRAND SALOON (ZK6858H9) (Intercity coach)
- Yutong-Master CHARISMA (ZK6122HLP) (Intercity coach)

=== Iveco ===
(Coming soon)
