= Changan CS75 Pro =

Chinese mid-size crossover SUV

Changan X7 Plus
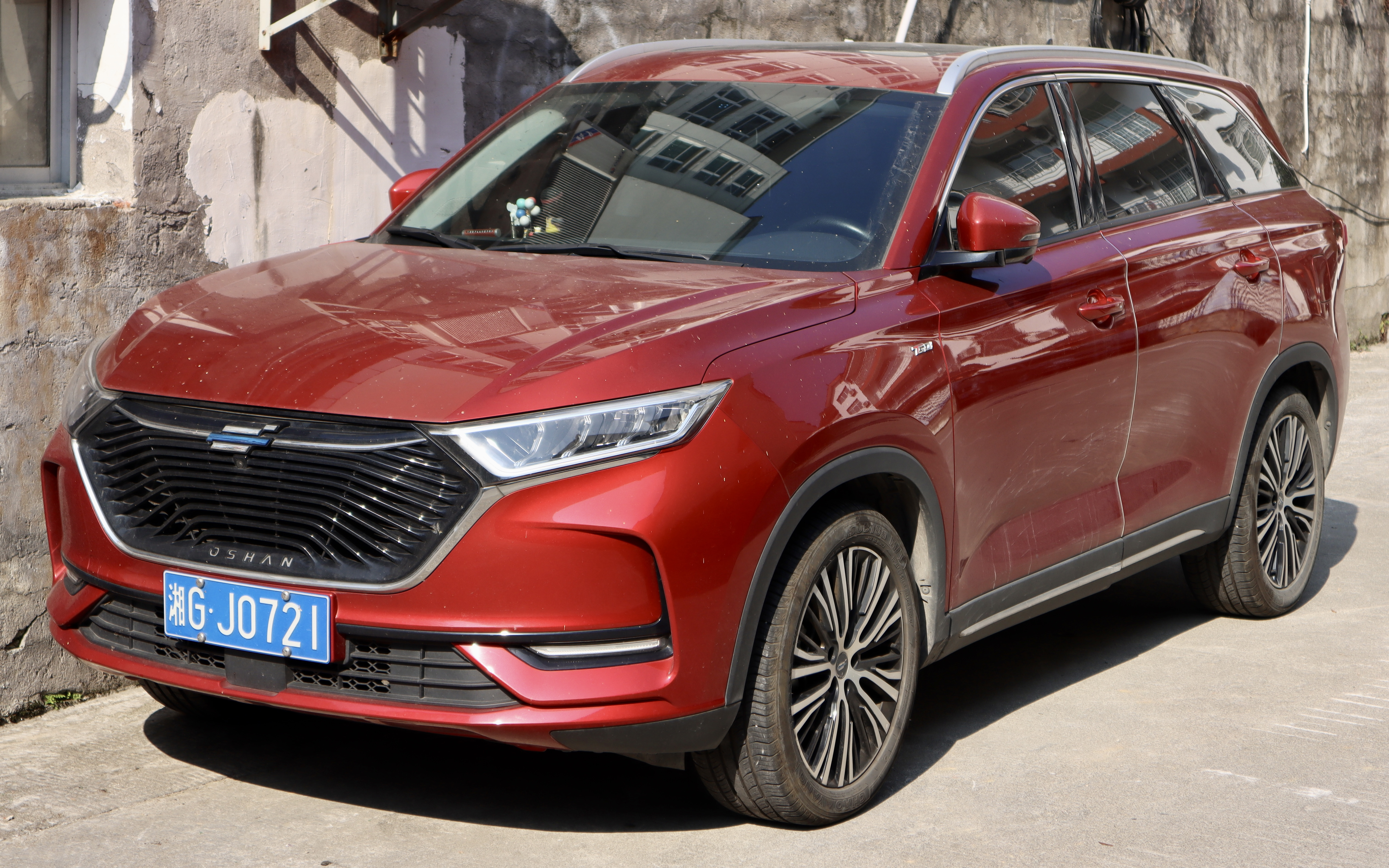

Overview
- Manufacturer: Changan Automobile
- Also called: Changan Oshan X7 (Pakistan); Changan X7 Plus (China, 2024–present); Changan CS75 Pro (China, 2025–present)
- Production: 2019–2024 (Oshan X7/X7 Plus); 2024–present (Changan X7 Plus); 2025–present (Changan CS75 Pro); 2022–present (Pakistan)
- Assembly: China: Chongqing; Pakistan: Karachi, (Master Changan Motors Ltd.)

Body and chassis
- Class: Mid-size crossover SUV
- Body style: 5-door SUV
- Layout: Front-engine, front-wheel-drive

Powertrain
- Engine: 1.5 L I4 (turbo petrol)
- Transmission: 6-speed manual 7-speed DCT

Dimensions
- Wheelbase: 2,780 mm (109.4 in)
- Length: 4,705 mm (185.2 in)
- Width: 1,860 mm (73.2 in)
- Height: 1,720 mm (67.7 in)

The Changan CS75 Pro and Changan X7 Plus, or previously known as Oshan X7, is a mid-size crossover SUV produced by Changan Automobile under the Oshan brand. The vehicle was renamed to the Changan brand after the Oshan brand was discontinued in 2024.

== History ==
On 25 July 2019, it became the second car to ever be launched into space, as a dummy payload on iSpace's Hyperbola-1 rocket maiden flight.

== Overview ==
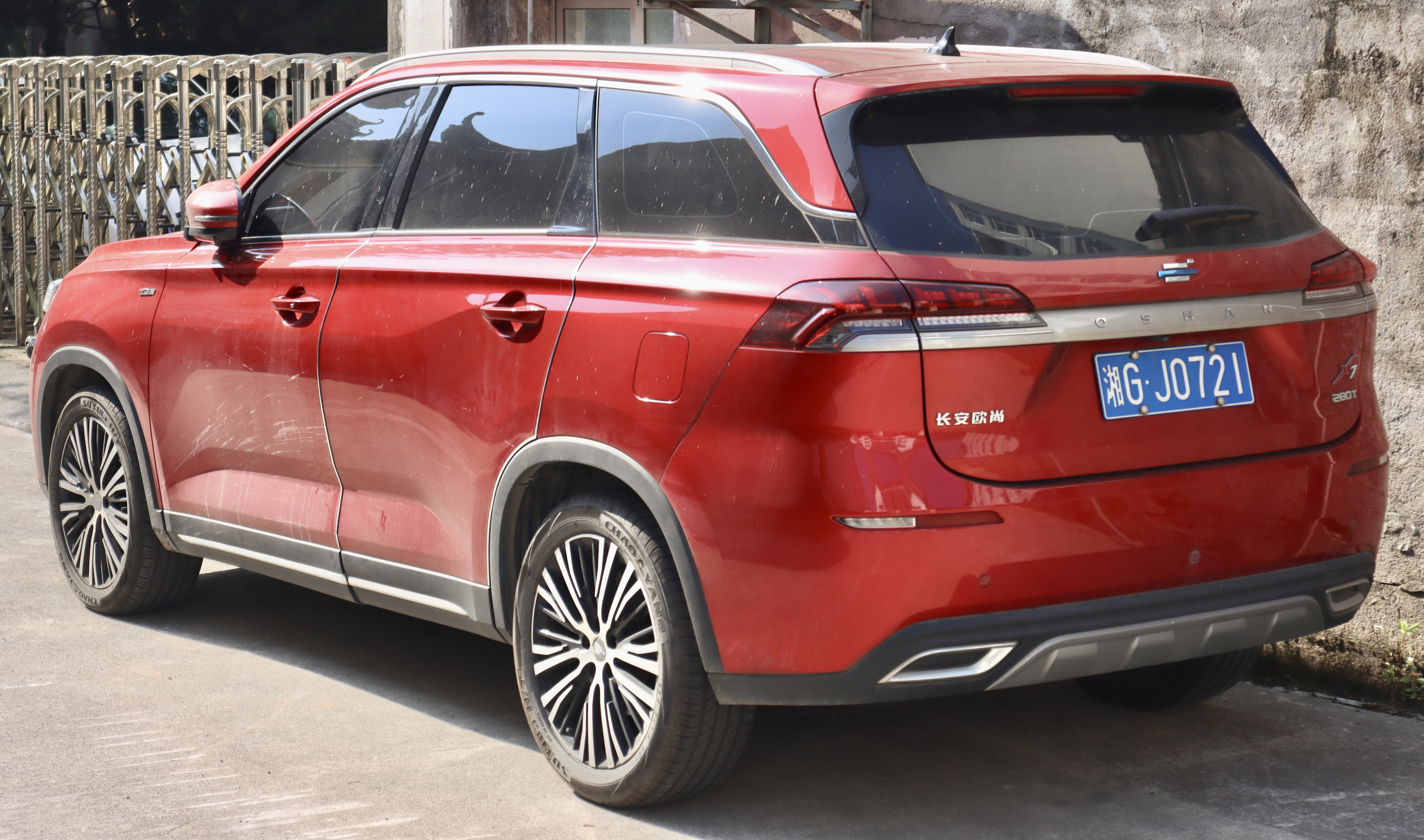
Rear view

The X7 debuted on the 2019 Shanghai Auto Show and was launched on the Chinese auto market right after with prices ranging from 79,900 yuan to 119,900 yuan.

=== Powertrain ===
The X7 is powered by a 1.5-litre turbo engine producing 131 kilowatts (176 hp; 178 PS) and 265 N⋅m (195 lb⋅ft; 27 kg⋅m), or an electric version with a range of around 250 miles (402 km).

== Oshan X7 Plus, Changan X7 Plus, and Changan CS75 Pro ==
The X7 received a facelift for the 2021 model year, known as the Oshan X7 Plus. The X7 Plus was launched during the 2021 Shanghai Auto Show, featuring redesigned front and rear ends with split headlights, full-width taillights, and new interior changes, such as repositioned A/C vents and an elevated touchscreen display, along with various mechanical updates. The powertrain of the X7 Plus is equipped with a 1.5-liter turbo engine producing 131 kilowatts (176 hp; 178 PS) and 300 N⋅m (221 lb⋅ft; 31 kg⋅m) of torque, mated to a 7-speed dual-clutch transmission.

The Oshan X7 Plus received another facelift for 2024 and has been renamed the Changan X7 Plus. The Changan X7 Plus features a sporty red strip that is no longer attached to the front bumpers and side skirts, along with a new front grille that resembles the Changan UNI-Series, despite being part of Oshan's "X" line. Unlike the Pakistani-made 2024 facelift, the rear chrome bar on the trunk lid no longer spells "Oshan," as the Oshan brand was discontinued in 2024. The interior and powertrain of the Changan X7 Plus appear to be unchanged from the Oshan X7 Plus.

In March 2025, the Changan X7 Plus received another facelift and has been renamed the Changan CS75 Pro. It features a new front bumper grille design made of silver metallic clips that resemble those on the second-generation CS55 Plus. This model joins the already extensive CS75 compact crossover SUV series as the entry variant with a more affordable price tag. The interiors and powertrains appear to be unchanged.

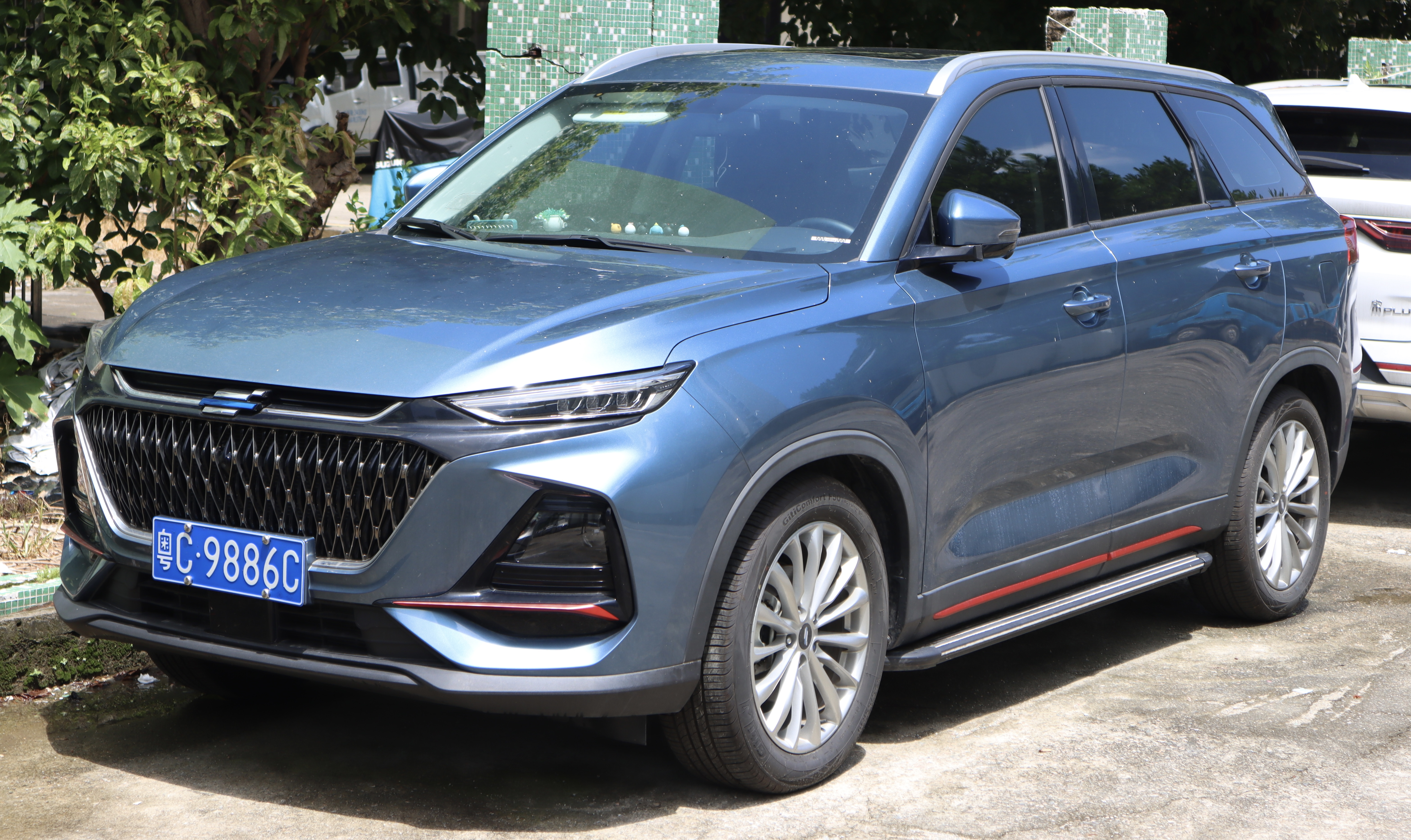
Oshan X7 Plus

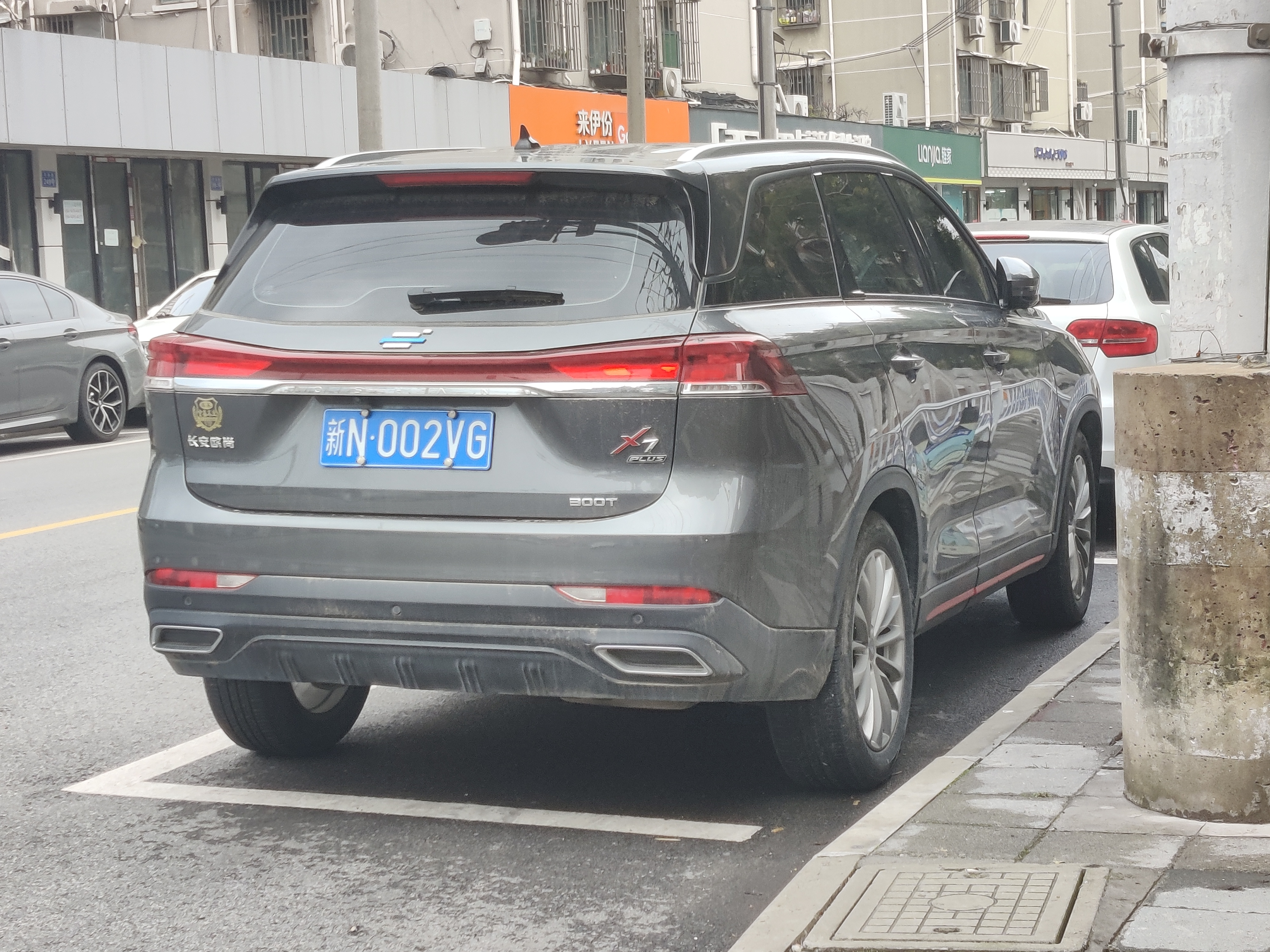
Rear view

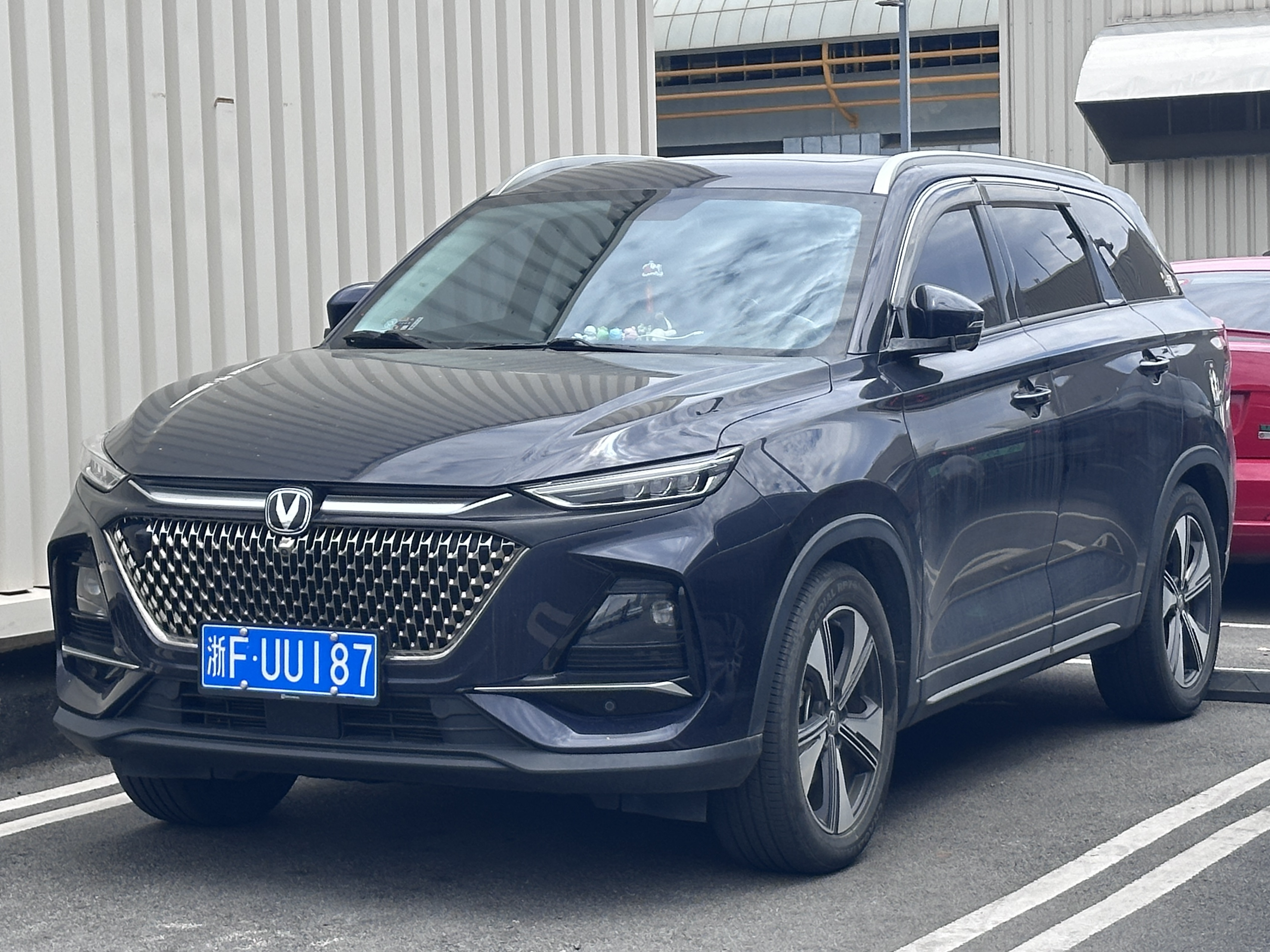
Changan X7 Plus

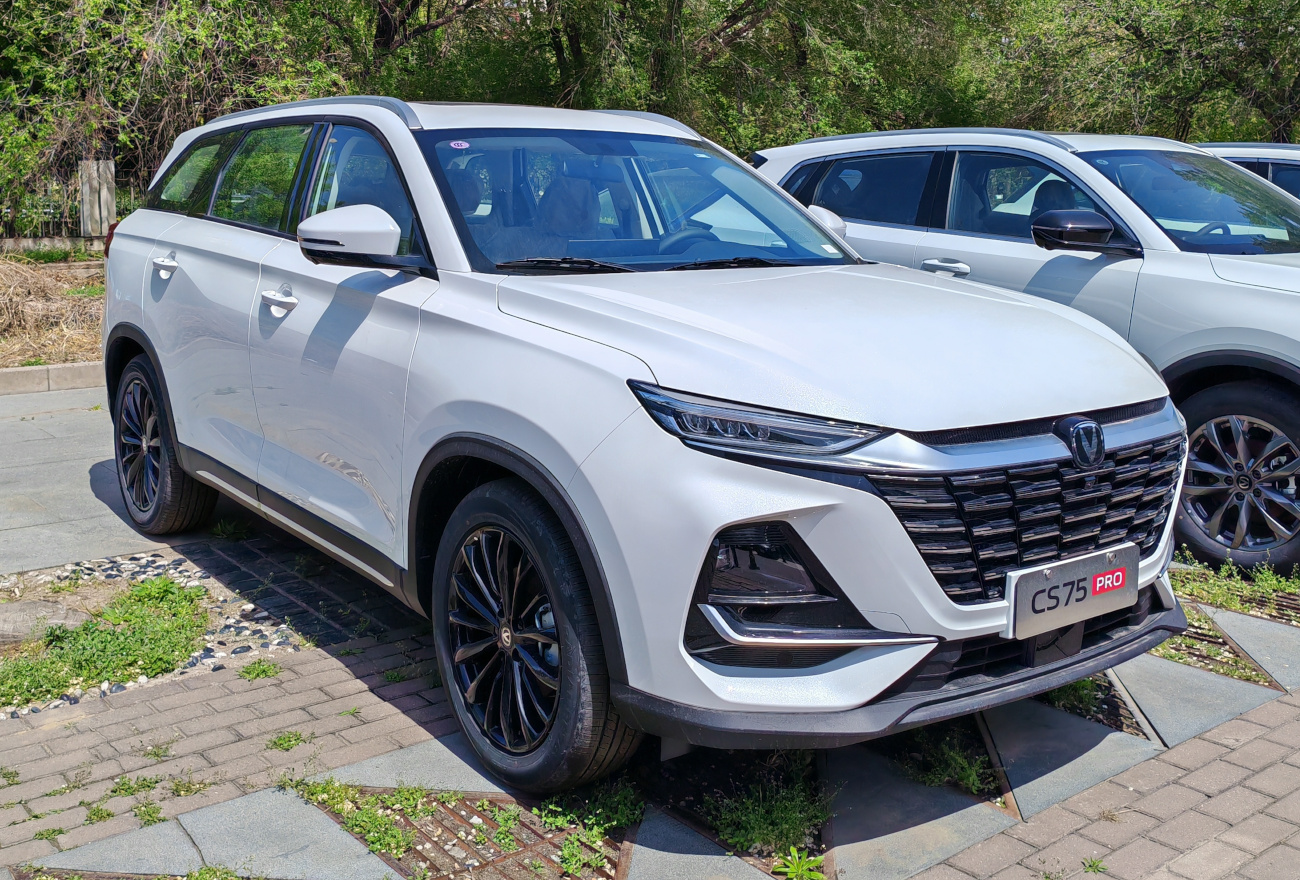
Changan CS75 Pro

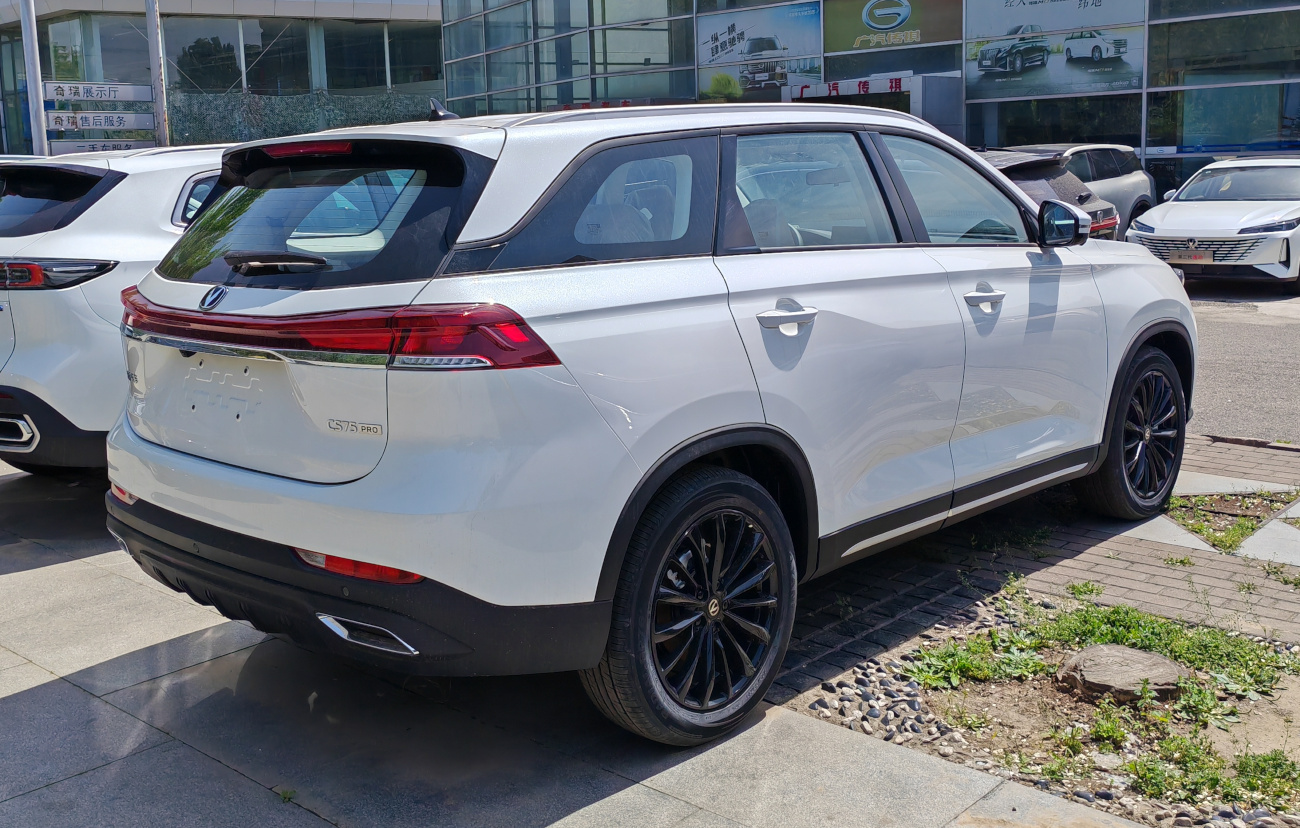
Rear view

== Other markets ==
=== Pakistan ===
In Pakistan, Changan Master Motors introduced the facelift version of the Oshan X7 in March 2022 in only two trims, Comfort and FutureSense. Both trims are powered by a 1.5-litre turbo engine mated to a 7 Speed Dual Clutch Transmission. Comfort, which is the base model, has driver-only powered seats, reverse camera with rear parking sensors, cruise control. FutureSense trim has heated and ventilated 6-way powered front seats, adaptive cruise control with auto emergency braking, 360° camera with front parking sensors and powered trunk. A facelift version was introduced in 2024 which added new interior color. A refreshed infotainment screen was also added which has in-built navigation. A larger LCD gauge cluster was also added (10 inches compared to the old 7 inches). New exterior colors were introduced, and the front grille and monograms were also changed. Minor changes include Cup holders for 3rd-row passengers and proper over-the-shoulder seat belts for third-row occupants, middle row's 3rd headrest, newer styled diamond cut two-tone rims, higher quality cameras with voice controlled feature. The red accents on the exterior were replaced with silver accents. A new interior color was also introduced.

=== Kenya ===
In 2023, Changan Kenya introduced Oshan X7 in two variants, which were sold as CBU imported units.

== Sales ==
Year	China		
Year	Oshan X7	Oshan X7 Plus	Changan X7 Plus
2023	6	38,641	—
2024	4,394	3,865	19,894
2025	12,305	—	—
