= Changan Alsvin =

Chinese subcompact car series

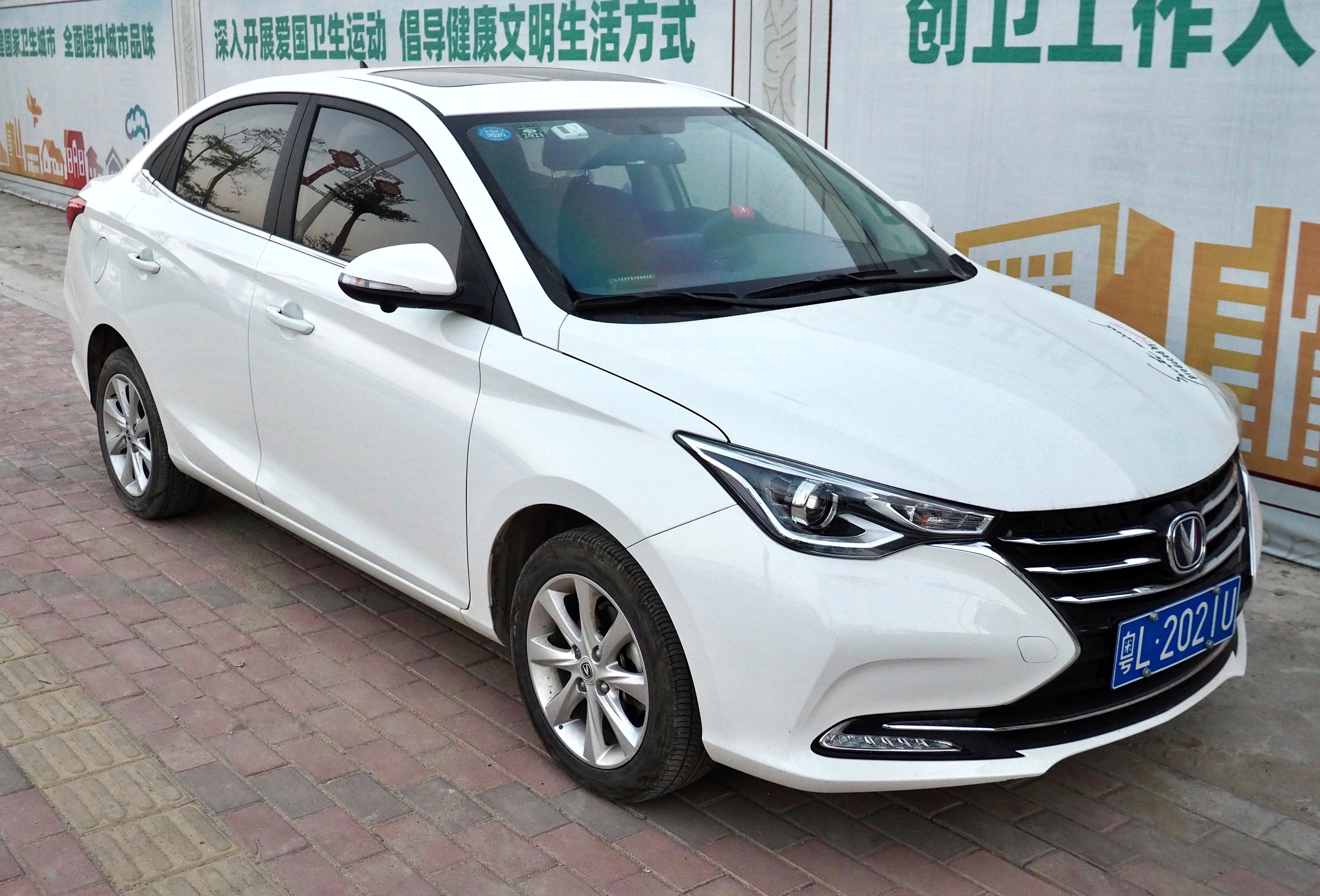

Overview
- Manufacturer: Changan Automobile
- Production: 2009–present

Body and chassis
- Class: Subcompact car (B)
- Body style: 4-door sedan 5-door hatchback

The Changan Alsvin or Changan Yuexiang (Chinese: 悦翔) is a subcompact sedan produced by Chinese auto maker Changan Automobile. A slightly redesigned facelift called the Alsvin V5 was launched in 2014 as a more premium trim of the Changan Alsvin and positioned slightly above. The Alsvin and Alsvin V5 were different in styling on the front and rear ends and were sold side by side.

== First generation (2009–2013) ==
Changan Alsvin (First generation)
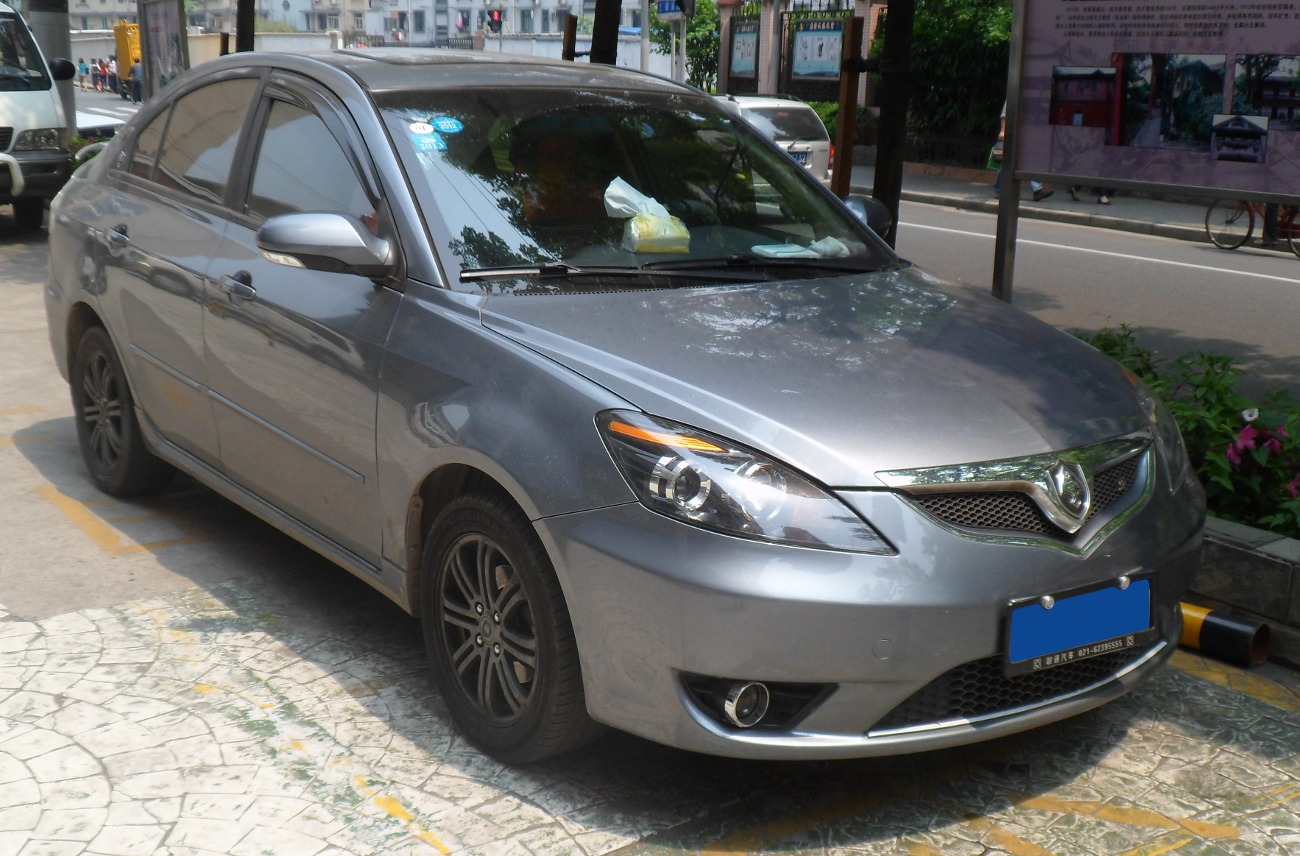

Overview
- Manufacturer: Changan
- Production: 2009–2013
- Model years: 2009–2013

Body and chassis
- Class: Subcompact car/Supermini (B)
- Body style: 4-door sedan 5-door hatchback
- Layout: Front-engine, front-wheel-drive

Powertrain
- Engine: 1.5 L JL475Q7 I4 (petrol)
- Transmission: 5-speed manual 4-speed automatic

Dimensions
- Wheelbase: 1,465 mm (57.7 in)
- Length: 4,360 mm (171.7 in)
- Width: 1,710 mm (67.3 in)
- Height: 1,475 mm (58.1 in)

Chronology
- Successor: Changan Alsvin V5

The Alsvin was first previewed at the 2008 Beijing Auto Show in April 2008 as the Changan V101 Concept. The three-box sedan production model started to roll off the assembly line in Chongqing on February 7, 2009, and hit showrooms on March 18 2009. The original Alsvin was designed by Luciano D'Ambrosio at Changan’s design center in Turin, Italy. A hatchback variant was released in late 2009 and production ended in three years due to low demand.

Originally launched in 2009, the price of the Changan Alsvin ranges from 53,900 yuan to 69,900 yuan which is one of the cheapest sedans on the Chinese auto market. The only engine option is a 114 hp 1.5L with a 5-speed manual transmission.

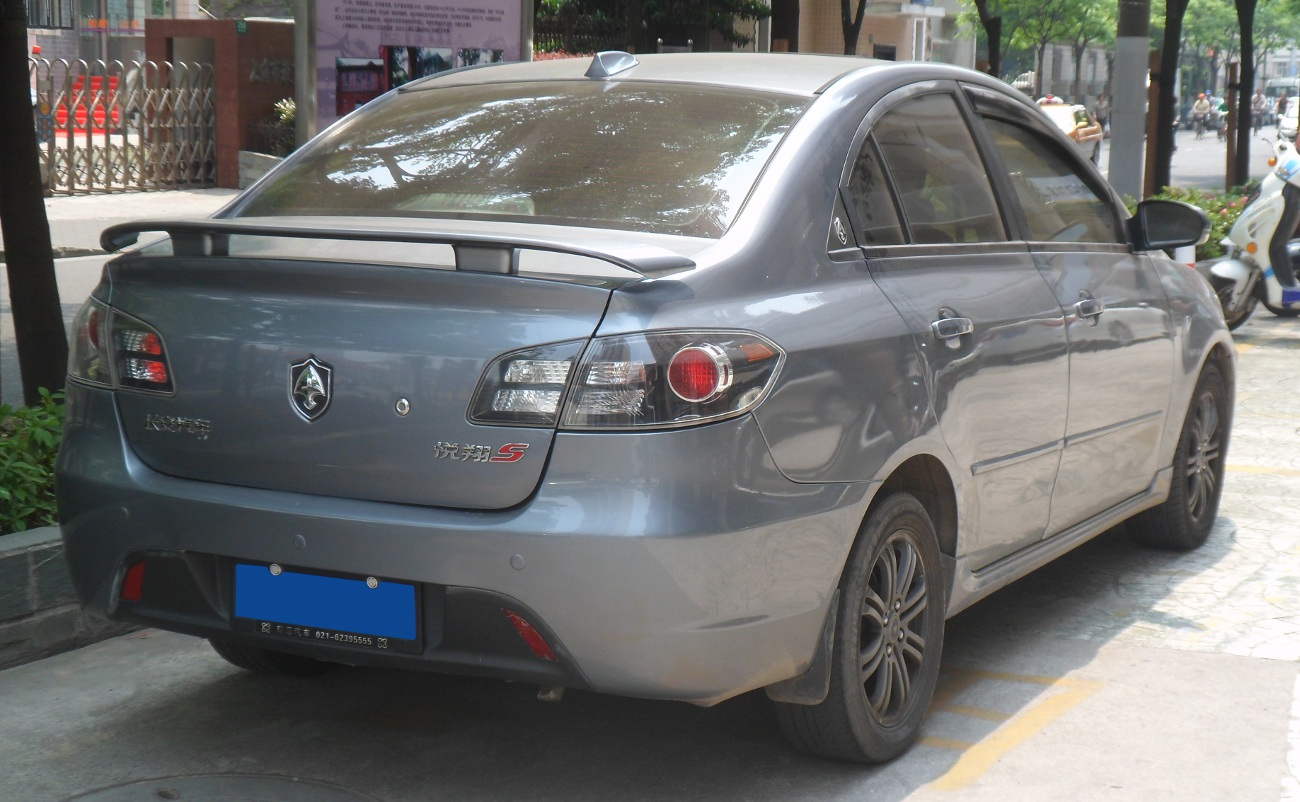
Changan Alsvin sedan rear

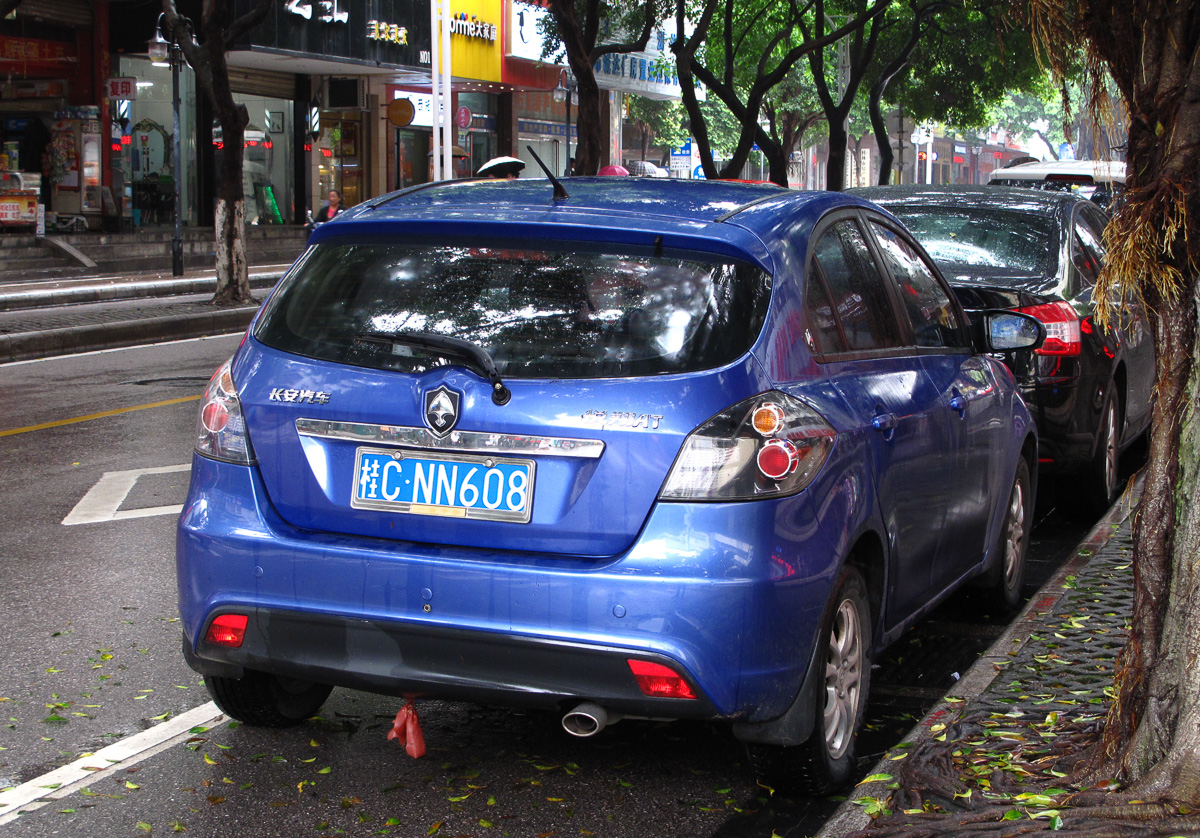
Changan Alsvin hatchback rear

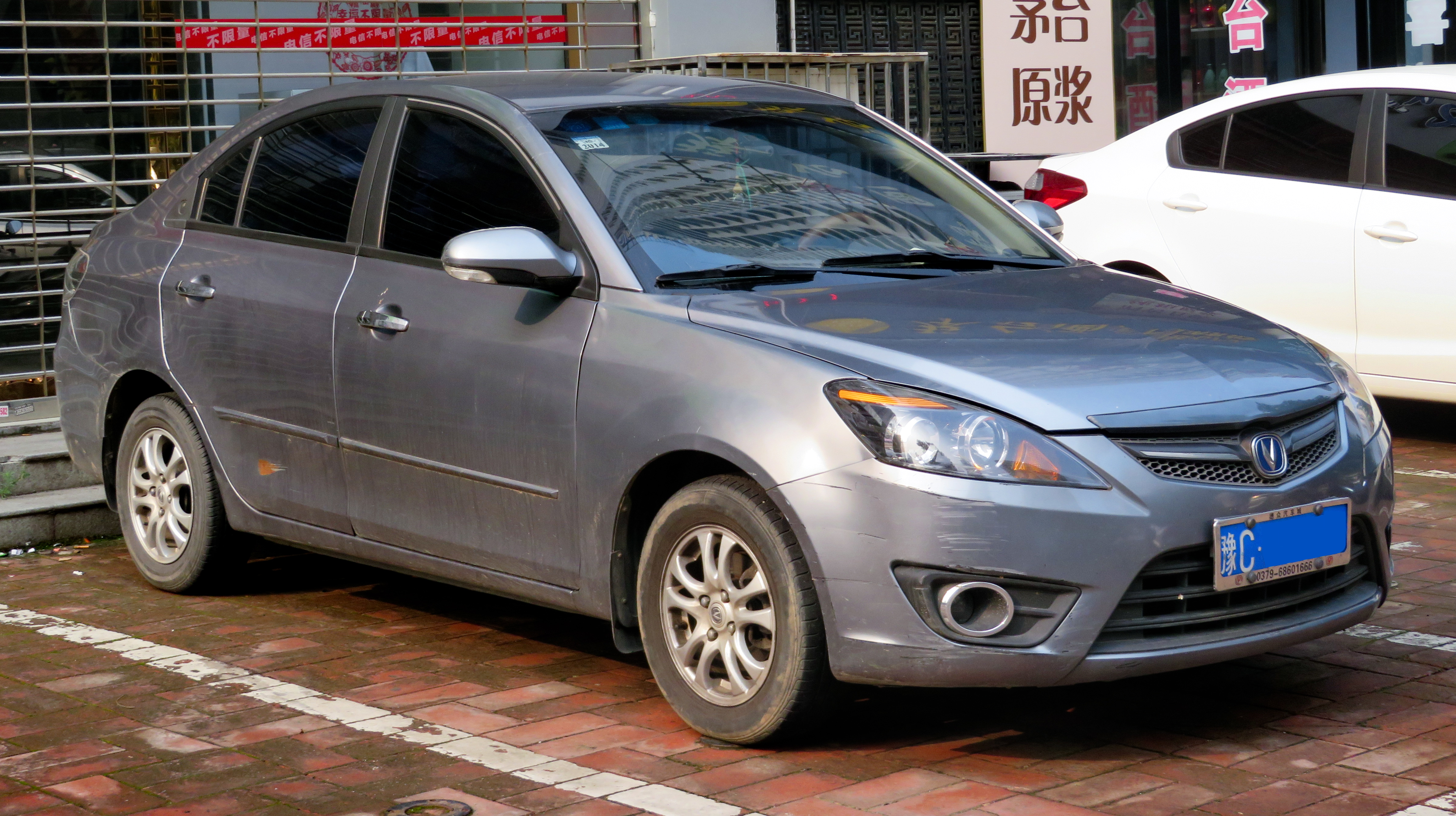
Changan Alsvin (facelift; grille & bumper change fitted with new badge)

== Second generation (Alsvin V5) (2012–2017) ==
Changan Alsvin V5
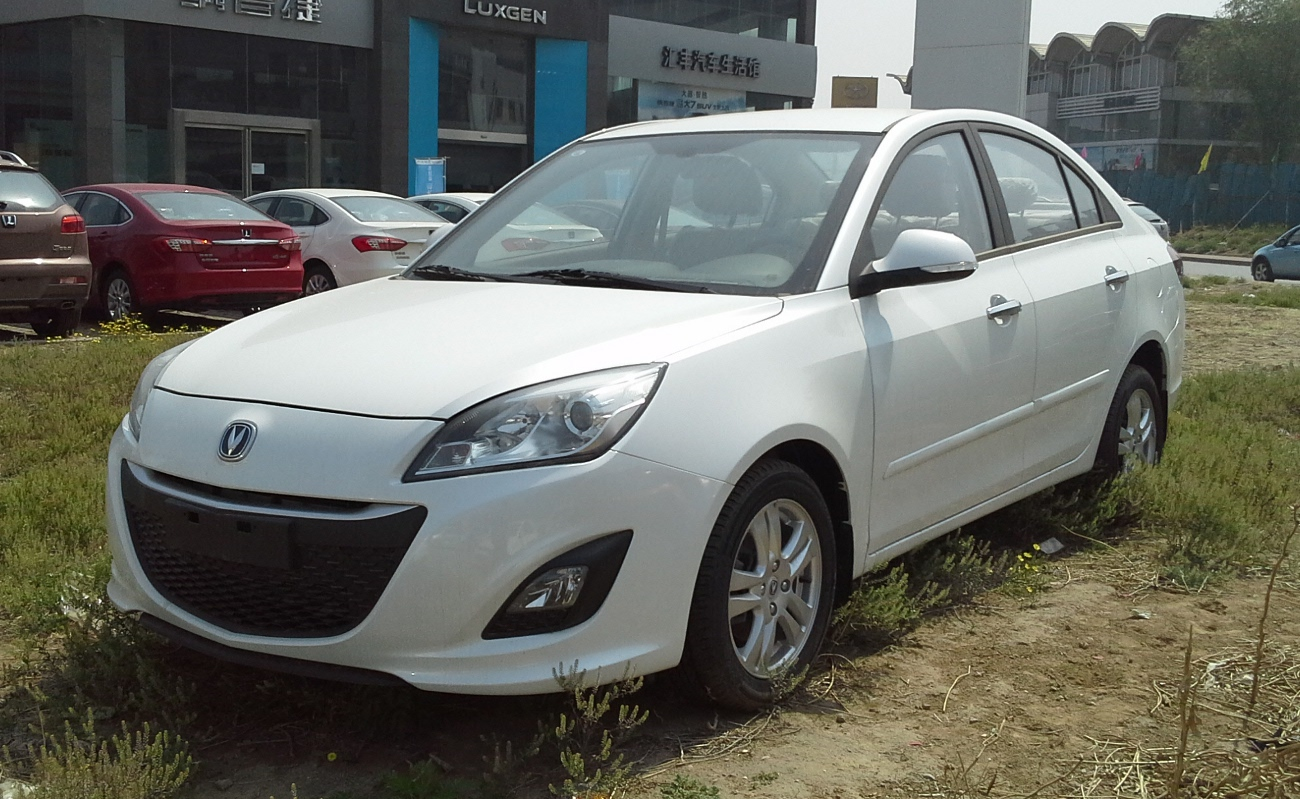

Overview
- Manufacturer: Changan
- Production: 2012–2017
- Model years: 2012–2017

Body and chassis
- Class: Subcompact car/Supermini (B)
- Body style: 4-door sedan
- Layout: Front-engine, front-wheel-drive

Powertrain
- Engine: 1.3 L I4; 1.4 L BlueCore I4
- Transmission: 5-speed manual 4-speed automatic

Dimensions
- Wheelbase: 2,515 mm (99.0 in)
- Length: 4,415 mm (173.8 in)
- Width: 1,740 mm (68.5 in)
- Height: 1,475 mm (58.1 in)

Chronology
- Successor: Changan Eado DT; Changan Alsvin (Third Generation)

The Alsvin V5 is a subcompact sedan based on the Alsvin and produced by Changan Auto at the Changan plant in Fangshan, Beijing. The Alsvin V5 is a redesigned, and more premium version of the original Alsvin sedan. During development phase, the V5 was coded B207. The Alsvin V5 launched at the 2012 Beijing Auto Show and was listed in September 2012. In 2013, the combined sales of the original Alsvin sedan and the updated Alsvin V5 reached 52,203.

Both front and rear DRGs have been redesigned and just like the original Changan Alsvin with styling resembling the first generation Mazda 3, the styling of the Alsvin V5 was criticized of resembling the second generation Mazda 3.

The Alsvin V5 is equipped with a Blue Core 1.5 liter inline-4 16V DOHC DVVT engine producing 84 kW and 145Nm with a 5-speed manual transmission or a 4-speed automatic transmission.

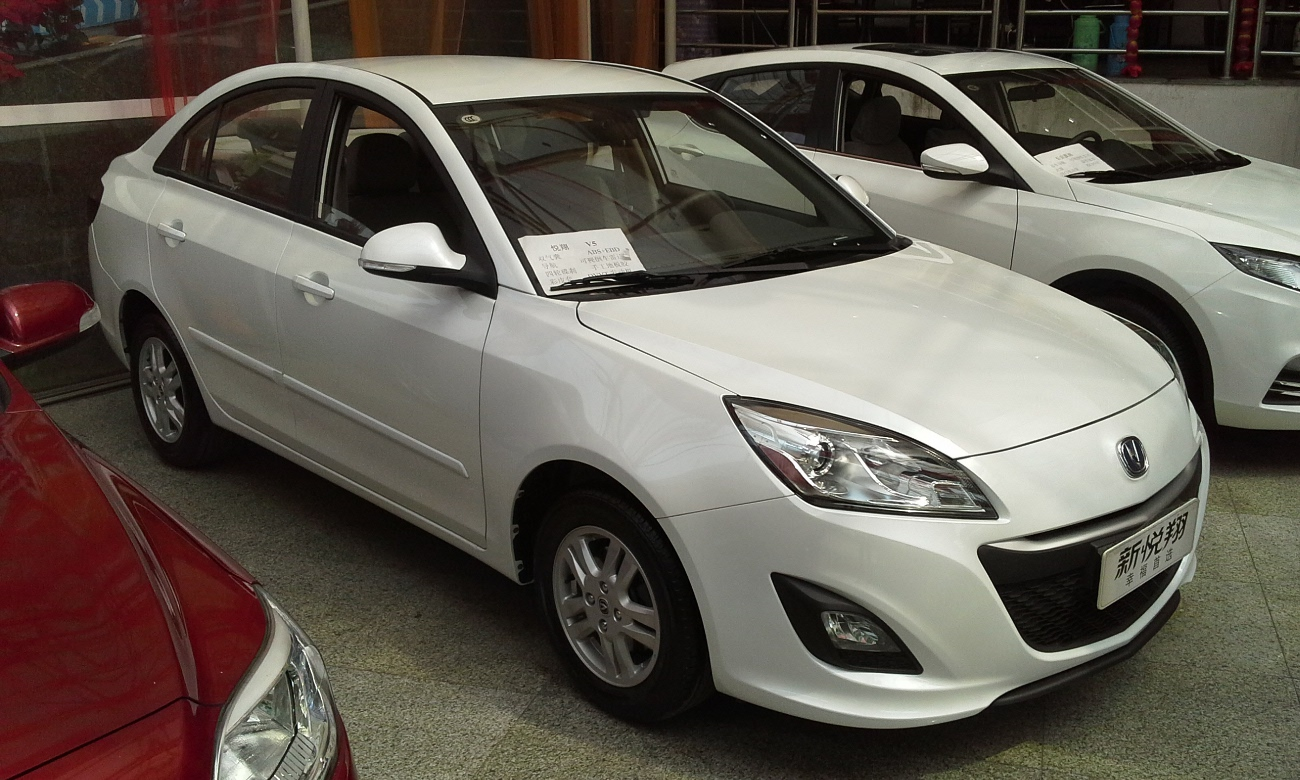
Front view of the Changan Alsvin V5

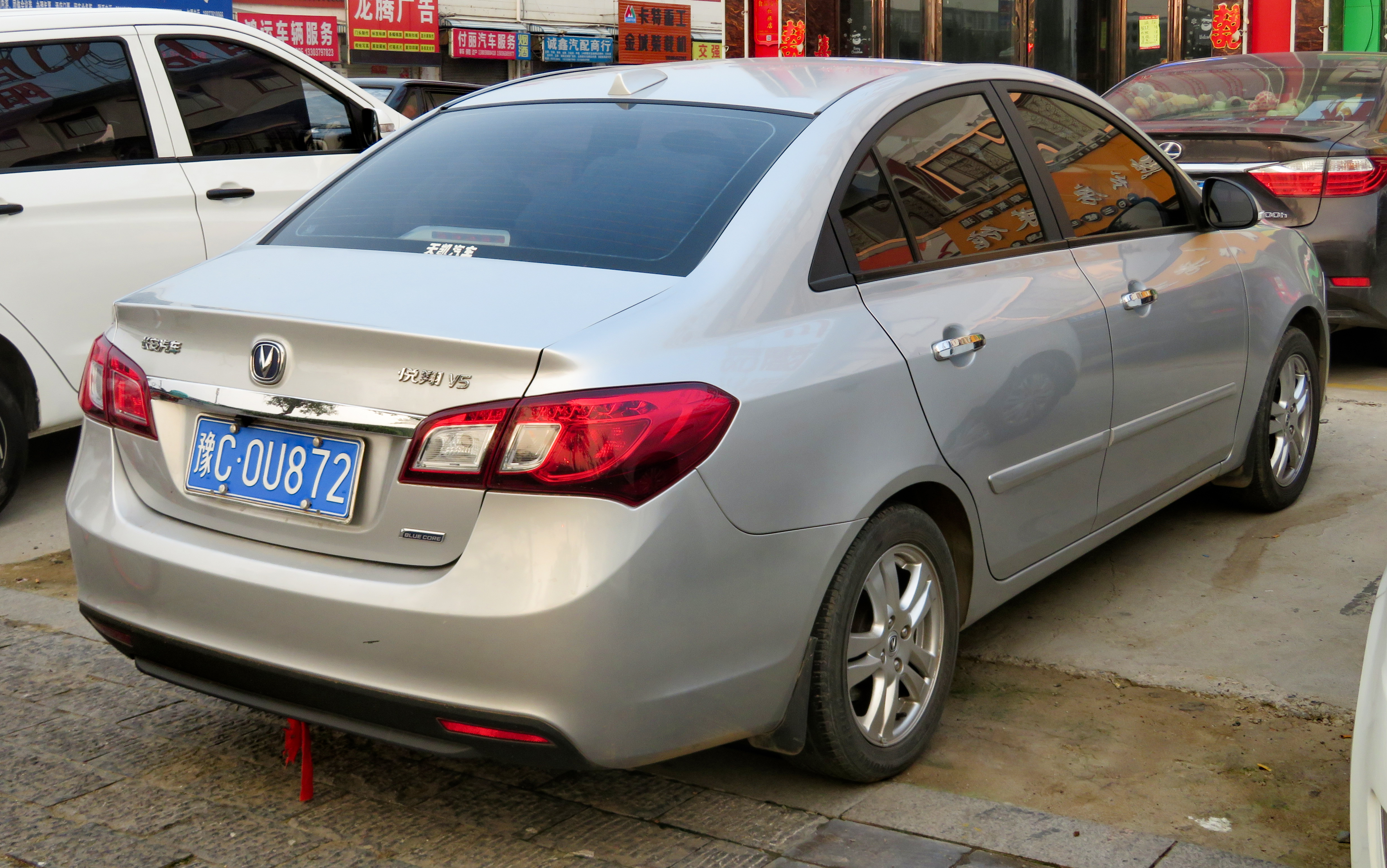
Rear view of the Changan Alsvin V5

== Third generation (2017–present) ==
Changan Alsvin (Third generation)
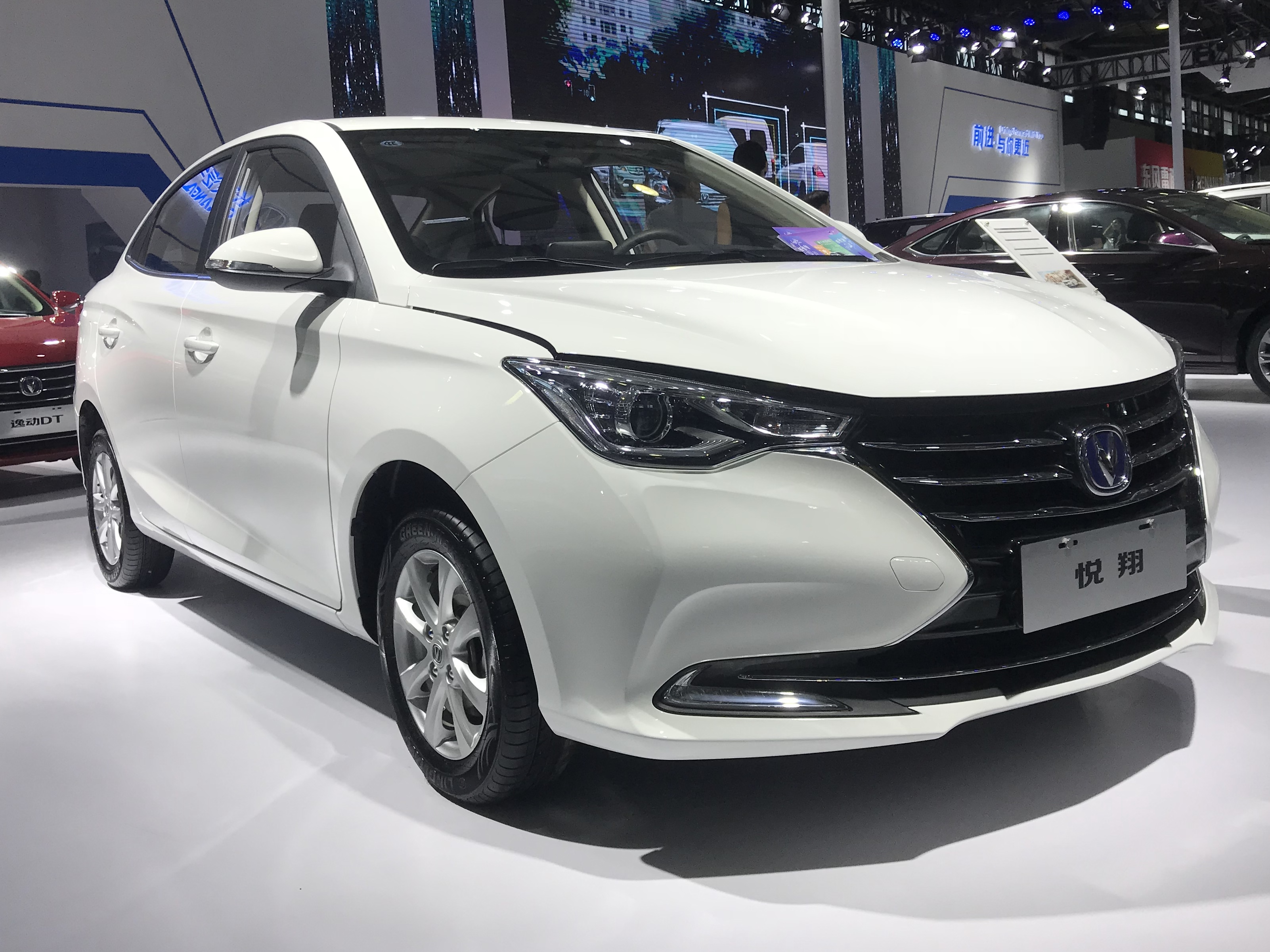

Overview
- Manufacturer: Changan
- Also called: Farda 511 (Iran)
- Production: 2017–2021 (China); 2017–present (outside China)
- Assembly: China: Chongqing; Pakistan: Karachi, (Master Changan Motors Ltd.)

Body and chassis
- Class: Subcompact car (B)
- Body style: 4-door sedan
- Layout: Front-engine, front-wheel-drive

Powertrain
- Engine: Petrol: 1.4 L Blue Core I4; 1.5 L Blue Core I4
- Power output: 74 kW (99 hp; 101 PS) (1.4 L petrol); 78 kW (105 hp; 106 PS) (1.5 L petrol)
- Transmission: 5-speed manual 5-speed dual clutch

Dimensions
- Wheelbase: 2,535 mm (99.8 in)
- Length: 4,390 mm (172.8 in)
- Width: 1,725 mm (67.9 in)
- Height: 1,490 mm (58.7 in)

Chronology
- Predecessor: Changan Alsvin V5

The third generation Changan Alsvin debuted at the 2018 Beijing Auto Show in April 2018 and is completely redesigned.

The safety performance features in the second generation Alsvin includes Anti-lock Braking System (ABS) with Electronic brakeforce distribution (EBD) technology, adaptive cruise control, hill-start assist, blind-spot warning system, rear view camera, and tyre pressure monitoring system. The infotainment system in the second generation Alsvin also features the updated InCall intelligent interconnect system.

The third generation Changan Alsvin is available with either a 1.4 liter engine with 101hp or 1.5 liter engine with 107hp mated to a 5-speed manual transmission or 5-speed DCT gearbox.

=== Markets ===
==== Mexico ====
On 21 July 2021, the Alsvin was announced as one of Changan's first models in the Mexican market after its arrival in alliance with MOTORNATION, the same company who markets BAIC and JMC vehicles in the Mexican market, alongside the CS35 Plus, CS55 Plus, CS75 Plus, and UNI-T SUVs. It is powered by either a 1.3 or 1.5-litre engine, and is offered in automatic and manual transmission options.

==== Pakistan ====
The third generation Alsvin was launched in Pakistan on 11 January 2021 by Master Motors, and is available in mainly two trim levels; 1.3L MT Comfort which is offered with Manual 5-Speed Transmission, 1.5L DCT Comfort offered with Automatic (DCT) 5-Speed Transmission, 1.5L Lumiere which is Automatic (DCT) 5-Speed & 1.5L Lumiere (Black Edition) Automatic 5-Speed dual clutch transmission. Whereas only Lumiere is equipped with sunroof and cruise control and climate control.

==== South Africa ====
The third generation Alsvin was launched in South Africa on 23 October 2025, as part of Changan's re-entry to the South African market. It is available with two variants: CS with the 1.4-litre engine (5-speed manual), and CE with the 1.5-litre engine (DCT).

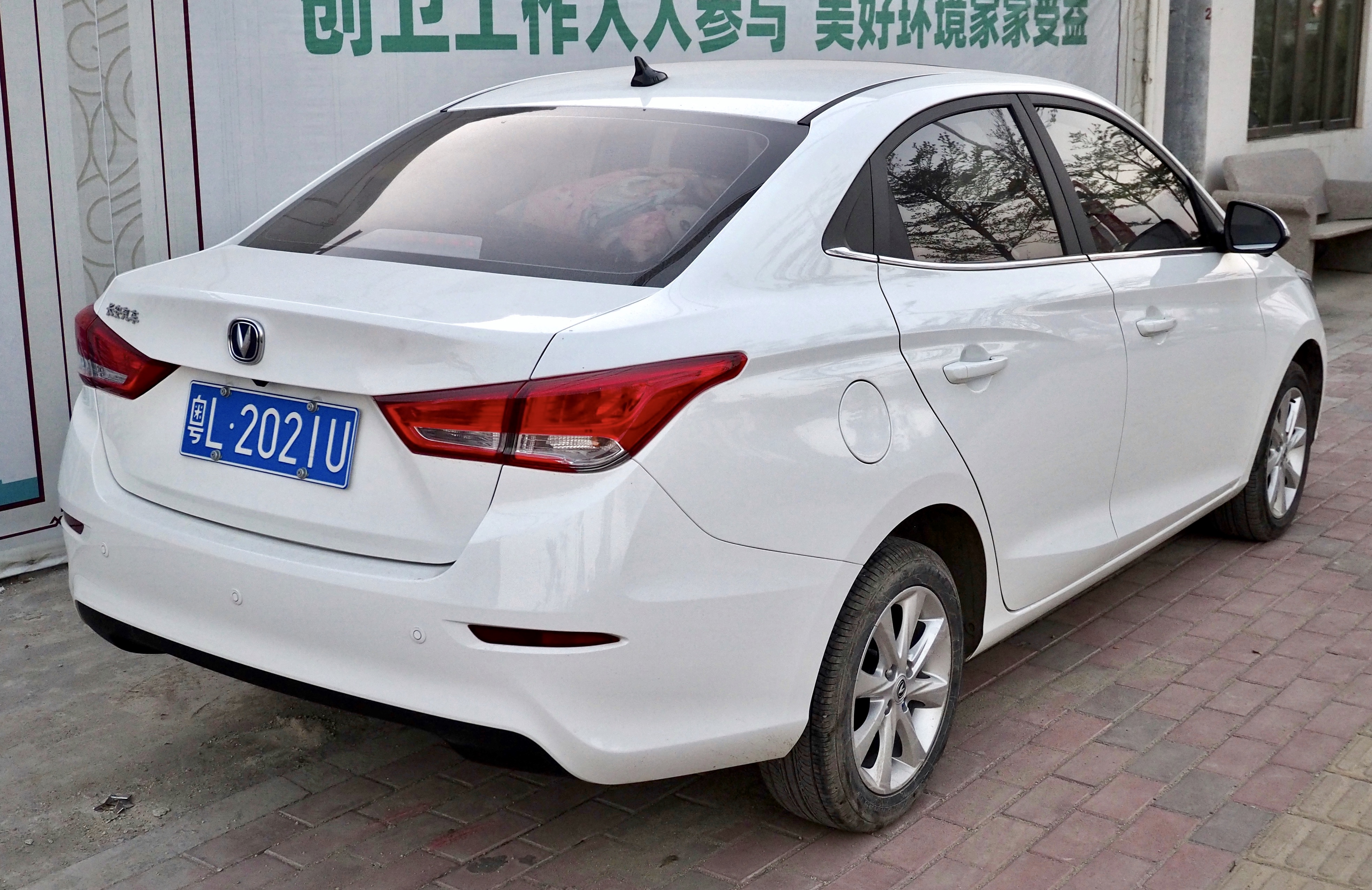
Rear view

== Sales ==
Year	Mexico
2021	456
2022	2,192
2023	2,443
2024	1,553
2025	3,751
