= Delirious =

Delirious may refer to:

- A state of delirium

== Film and television ==
- Delirious (1991 film), an American comedy directed by Tom Mankiewicz, starring John Candy
- Delirious (2006 film), an American comedy-drama directed by Tom DiCillo, starring Steve Buscemi
- Eddie Murphy Delirious, a 1983 stand-up comedy TV special

== Music ==
- Delirious?, a 1992–2009 English Christian rock band
- "Delirious" (David Guetta song), 2007
- "Delirious" (Prince song), 1982
- "Delirious (Boneless)", a song by Steve Aoki, Chris Lake, Tujamo, and Kid Ink, 2014
- "Delirious", a song by Vistoso Bosses featuring Soulja Boy, 2009
- "Delirious", a song by ZZ Top from Afterburner, 1985

== Other uses ==
- Delirious (wrestler), Hunter Johnston (born 1980), American professional wrestler
- De.lirio.us, a defunct social bookmarking site taken over by Simpy
- H2O Delirious, YouTuber and game commentator
