= The Dark Tower =

Dark Tower may refer to:

== Film and television ==
- The Dark Tower (1943 film), a circus film starring Herbert Lom
- The Tower of Rassilon, a fictional tomb that appeared in the 1983 Doctor Who story The Five Doctors
- Dark Tower (1987 film), a horror film starring Jenny Agutter
- The Dark Tower (2017 film), based on Stephen King's novel series of the same name
- "The Dark Tower", an episode of Revolution

== Literature ==
=== Stephen King ===
- The Dark Tower (series), a novel series by Stephen King ranging from 1982 to 2012
  - The Dark Tower VII: The Dark Tower (2004), the seventh novel in the series
  - The Dark Tower (comics), a comic book series based on the novel series

=== Other works ===
- The Dark Tower (Lewis novel), an unfinished novel attributed to C. S. Lewis
- The Dark Tower, a 1912 essay book by Alan D. Mickle
- The Dark Tower, a 1915 novel by Francis Brett Young
- The Dark Tower, a 1916 novel by Phyllis Bottome
- The Dark Tower, a 1966 novel by Mary Howard, writing as Josephine Edgar
- Barad-dûr, or the Dark Tower, the fortress of Sauron in J. R. R. Tolkien's The Lord of the Rings

== Gaming ==
- Dark Tower (game), a 1981 electronic board game
- Dark Tower (module), a 1980 adventure module for Advanced Dungeons & Dragons

== Theatre ==
- The Dark Tower (play), a 1933 comedy by George S. Kaufman and Alexander Woollcott
- Dark Tower – Commodore 64 Game by Spinnaker Software
- The Dark Tower (radio play), a 1946 radio play by Louis MacNeice

== Other uses ==
- The Dark Tower (album), a 2011 album by Nox Arcana
- Dark Tower (building), a building in New York City
- Almoayyed Tower, or Dark Tower, a building in Manama, Bahrain

== See also ==
- "Childe Roland to the Dark Tower Came", an 1855 poem by Robert Browning that inspired the Stephen King series above.
