= Dhanmondi Tutorial =

Educational institution of Bangladesh

Dhanmondi Tutorial (DT) was a private, English-medium school in the Dhanmondi residential area of Dhaka, Bangladesh. It was founded in 1972. As of 2016, it taught approximately 1500 students from kindergarten through A Levels. Classes were divided into a junior and a senior section, each of which had its own campus. As of July 2025, Dhanmondi Tutorial has discontinued all its educational activities.

== Curriculum ==
DT followed the British GCE and IGCSE syllabus and the students were taught for the Ordinary Level (O-level) and Advanced Level (A-level) examinations conducted by Edexcel International.

== Extracurricular activities ==
DT regularly competed in school handball tournaments. In 2004, they reached the finals of the Maple Leaf Mini Handball Tournament (girls), but lost to Maple Leaf. The same year, DT took third place in the 14th Bata School Handball Tournament (girls), edging BIS, and third place in the Sunnydale Mini Handball Tournament (boys), defeating BAF Shaheen College in sudden death overtime. Two years later, they again finished third in the Sunnydale Mini Handball Tournament (boys), beating Ansar VDP School.

In 2010, the school reached the finals of the Sunnydale Mini Handball Tournament (boys), but lost to Sunnydale School. Later that year, the handball squad travelled to Nepal to play four exhibition matches.

In 2014, the school reached the final of the Polar Ice Cream 22nd School Handball Tournament (boys), but was beaten by St Gregory's High School.

DT also engaged in competitive debating, participated in Bangladesh Scouts, and had a Model United Nations club, among other extracurricular activities.
