= Changan Eado DT =

Chinese subcompact sedan

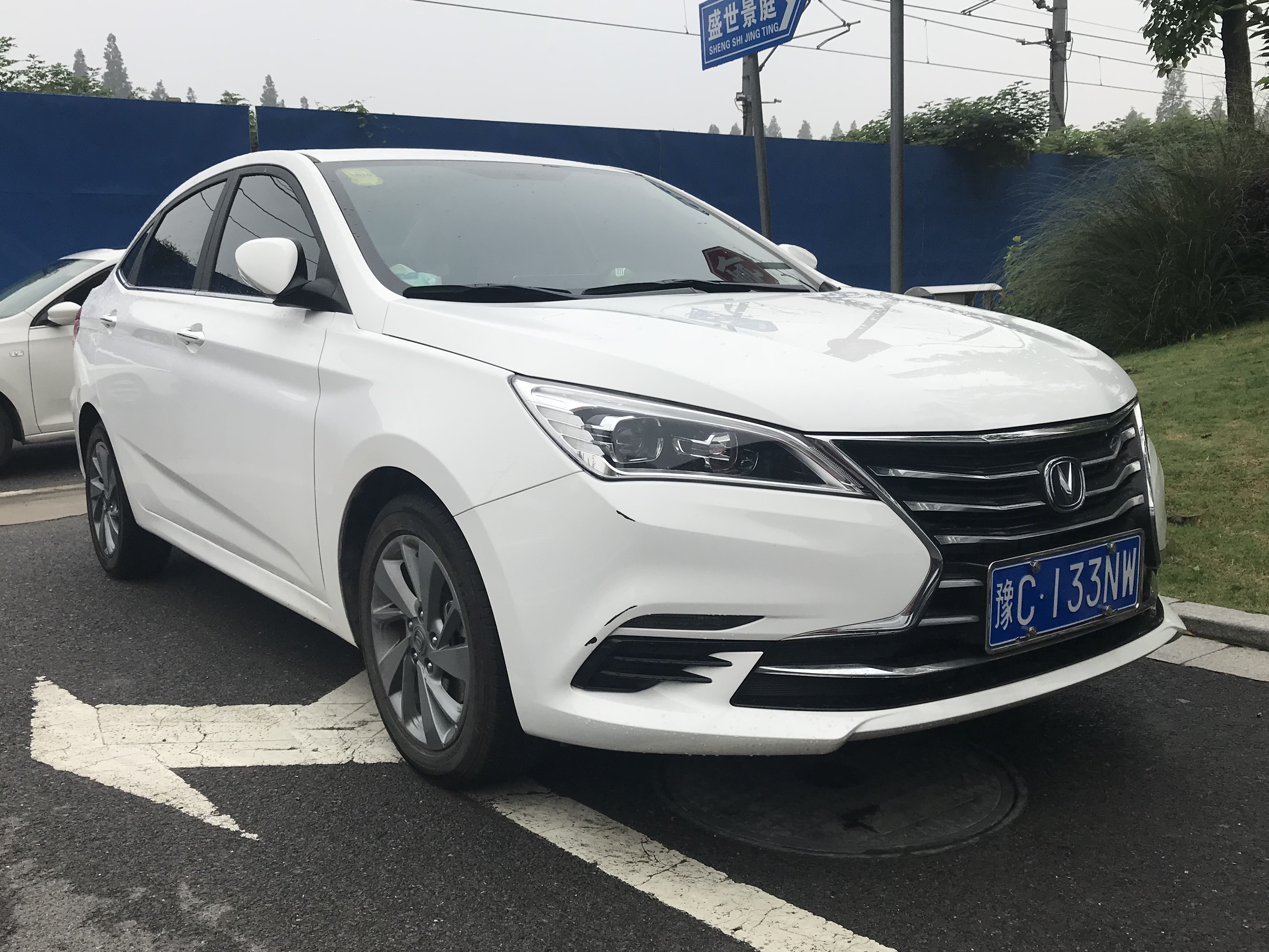
- Changan Eado DT

Overview
- Manufacturer: Changan Automobile
- Also called: Changan Alsvin V7
- Production: 2014–2022

Body and chassis
- Class: Subcompact/Supermini (B)
- Layout: FF layout

Chronology
- Predecessor: Alsvin; Alsvin V5

The Changan Eado DT (Chinese: 逸动DT) is a subcompact sedan produced by Changan Automobile. Originally called the Alsvin V7 (悦翔V7) before the 2018 facelift, the Eado DT subcompact sits above the Alsvin V5 subcompact sedan.

== Alsvin V7 ==
Alsvin V7
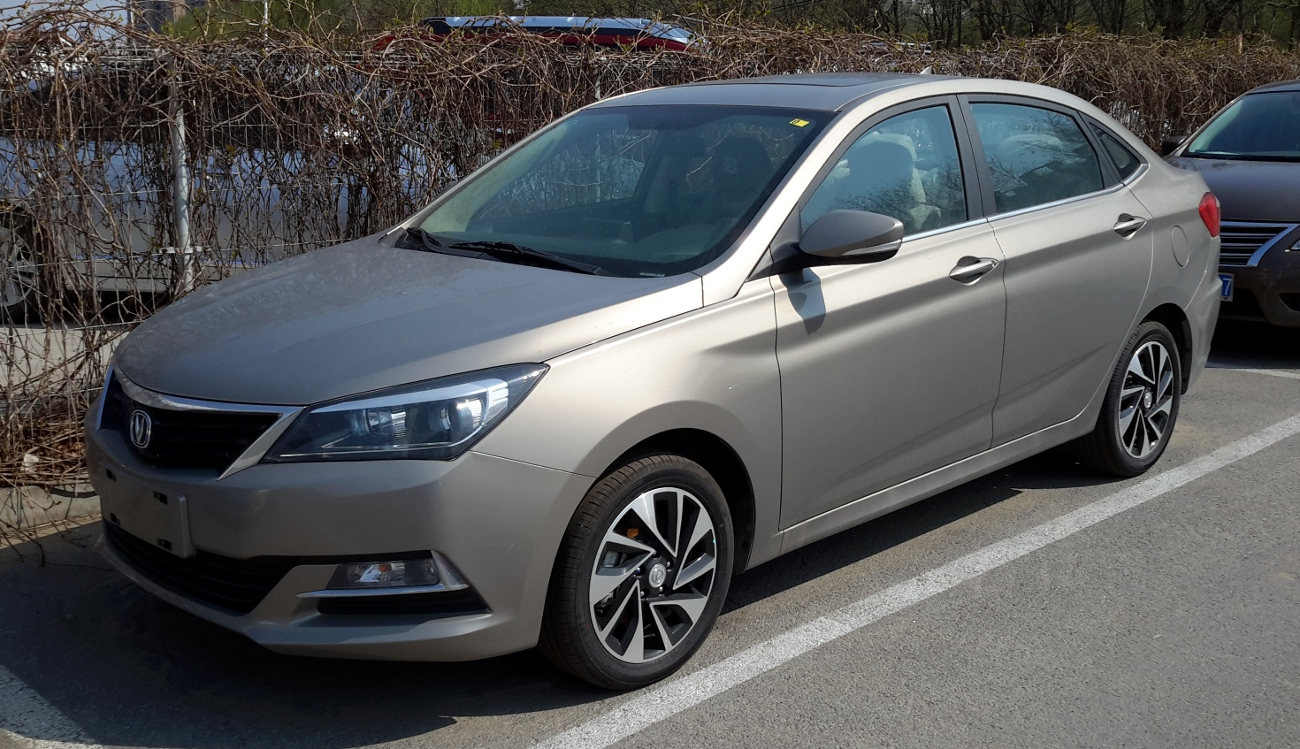

Overview
- Manufacturer: Changan
- Production: 2014–2017
- Model years: 2015–2017

Body and chassis
- Class: Subcompact car/Supermini (B)
- Body style: 4-door sedan
- Layout: Front-engine, front-wheel-drive

Powertrain
- Engine: 1.0 L BlueCore I3 (turbo petrol); 1.6 L JL478QEB I4 (petrol)
- Transmission: 6-speed manual 5-speed manual 4-speed automatic

Dimensions
- Wheelbase: 2,610 mm (102.8 in)
- Length: 4,530 mm (178.3 in)
- Width: 1,745 mm (68.7 in)
- Height: 1,498 mm (59.0 in)

Chronology
- Predecessor: Alsvin/Alsvin V5
- Successor: Eado DT

The Alsvin V7 (悦翔 V7) is the successor of the Alsvin subcompact sedan and also succeeds the Alsvin V5. Standing on a completely new platform and adding a new 1.6L four-cylinder engine as a new option, the styling of the Alsvin V7 was also updated with Changan's latest design language. Price ranges from 60.900 yuan to 86.900 yuan. The Alsvin V7 debuted in August 2014 on the 2014 Chengdu Auto Show.

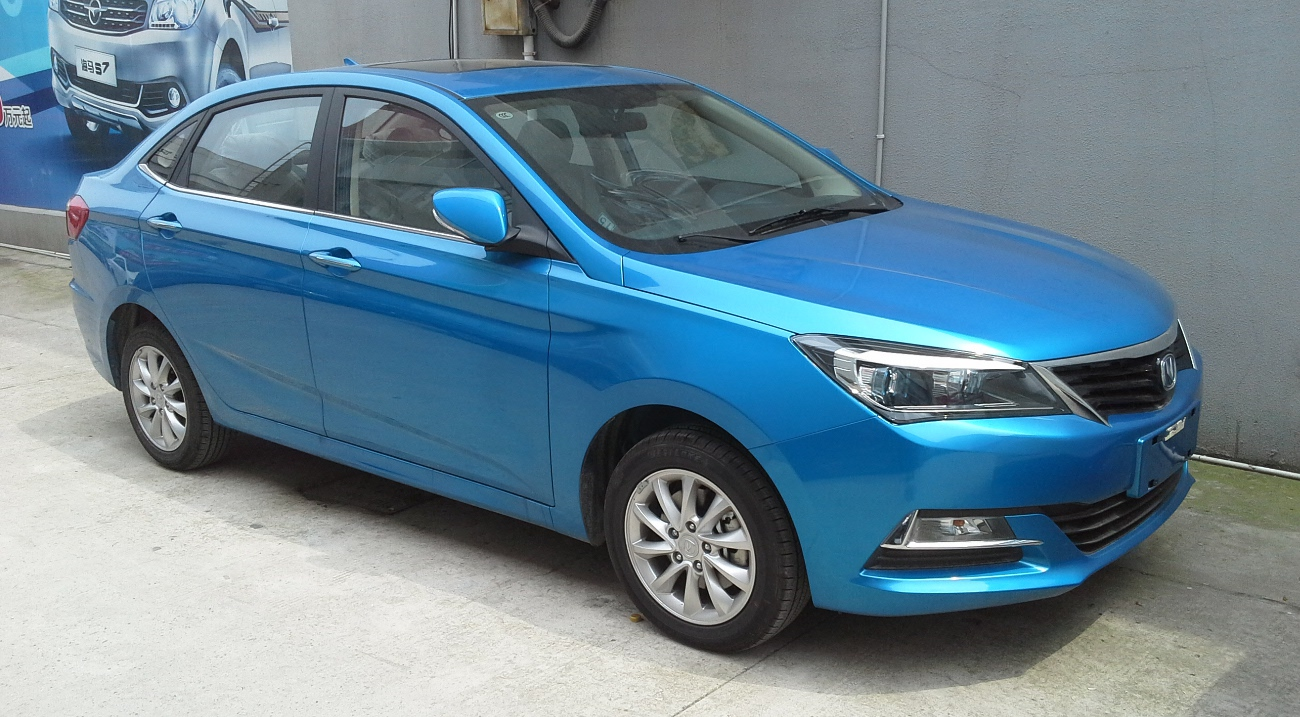
Front view of the Changan Alsvin V7.

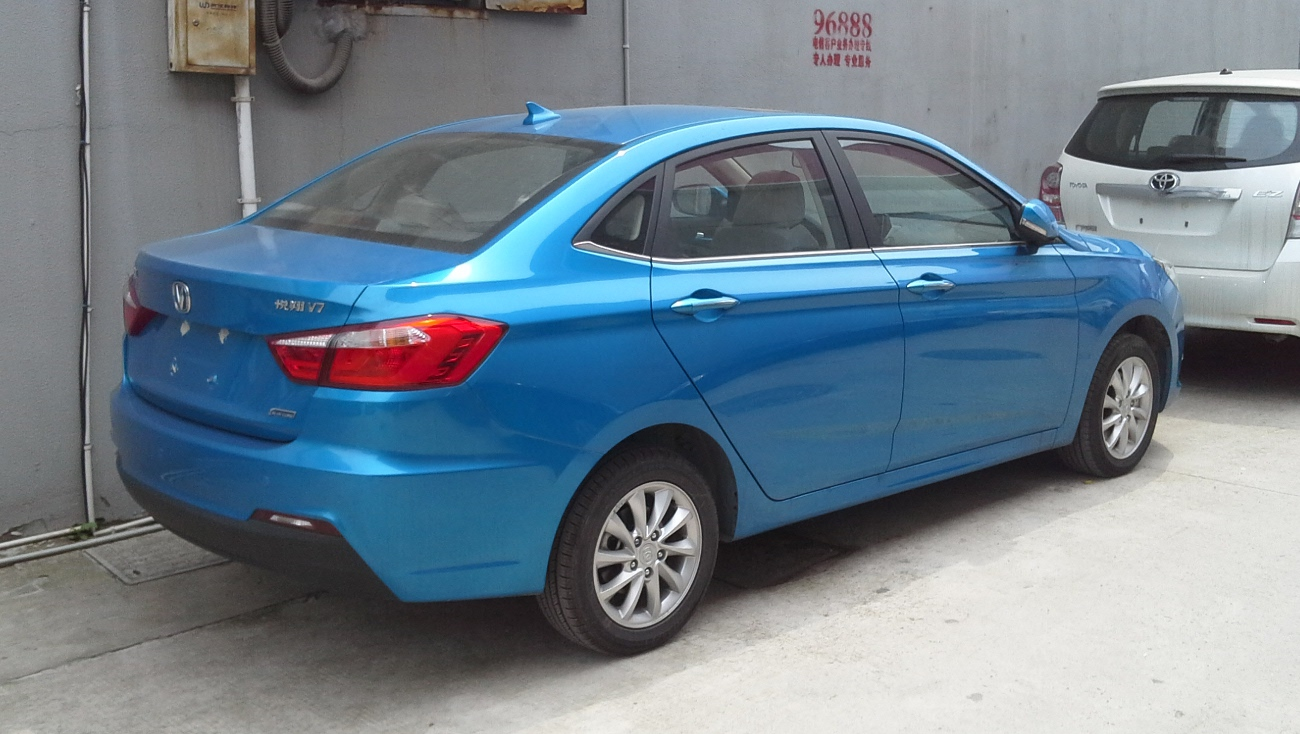
Rear view of the Changan Alsvin V7.

== Changan Eado DT ==
Changan Eado DT
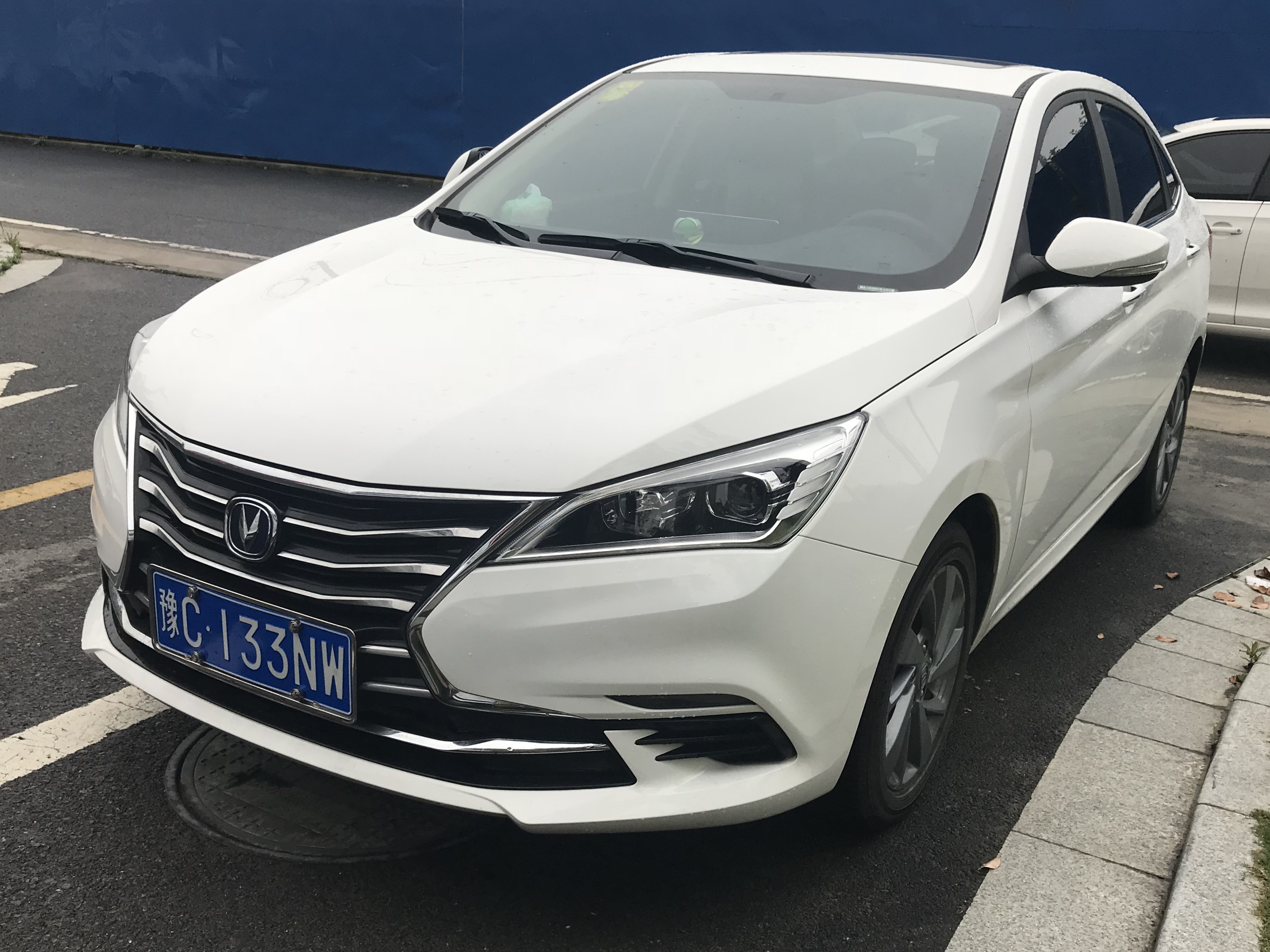

Overview
- Manufacturer: Changan
- Also called: Bahman Envoy (Iran); IKCO Envoy (Iran)
- Production: 2018–2022; 2026–present (Iran)

Body and chassis
- Class: Subcompact car/Supermini (B)
- Body style: 4-door sedan
- Layout: Front-engine, front-wheel-drive

Powertrain
- Engine: 1.0 L JL372ZQ1 I3 (turbo petrol); 1.6 L JL478QEE I4 (petrol)
- Transmission: 6-speed manual 5-speed manual 4-speed automatic

Dimensions
- Wheelbase: 2,610 mm (102.8 in)
- Length: 4,575 mm (180.1 in)
- Width: 1,750 mm (68.9 in)
- Height: 1,500 mm (59.1 in)

Chronology
- Predecessor: Alsvin V7; Alsvin V3

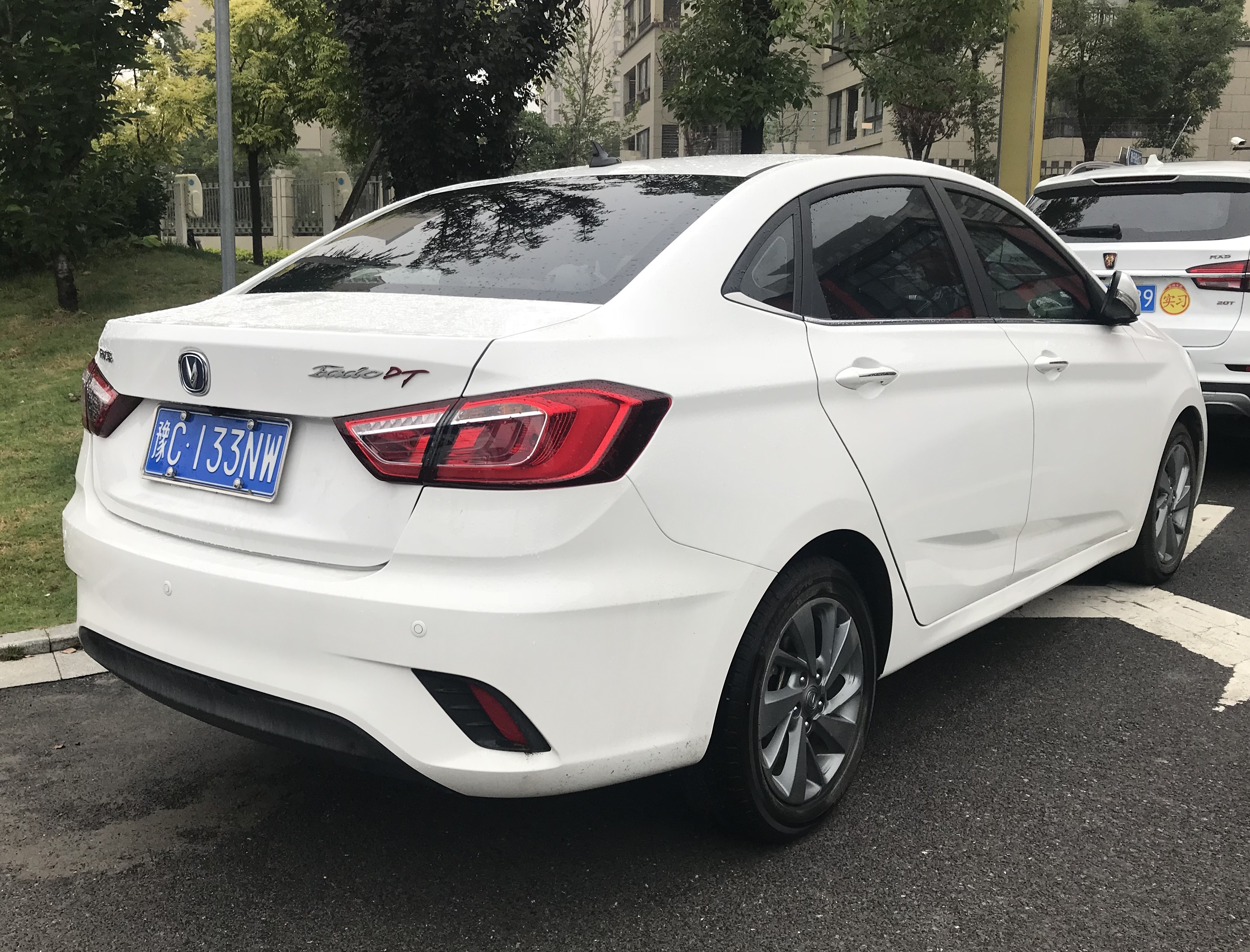
Changan Eado DT rear

Debuting at the Beijing's Auto Show in April 2018, the Changan Eado DT is positioned to be the entry model of the Eado family under the Changan Eado/Eado XT compact car. Being essentially a rebadged Alsvin V7, the dimensions are basically the same as that of the Alsvin V7. The Eado DT is equipped with the same engines from the Alsvin V7, with a naturally aspirated 1.6 liter engine producing 124 hp (92 kW; 126 PS) or a 1.5 liter turbocharged engine producing 170 hp (127 kW; 172 PS) mated to either a 5-speed manual or a 5-speed automatic transmission.
