= Delirium tremens (disambiguation) =

Delirium tremens usually refers to an alcohol withdrawal process (also known as The DT's).

Delirium tremens can also refer to:

- A beer by the Huyghe Brewery
- Omega, California, formerly Delirium Tremens, now a ghost town in Nevada County
- Delirium Tremens (Sulfur album), 1998
- Delirium Tremens (Mick Harvey album), 2016
- An album by X-Alfonso
- A song by Christy Moore
