= List of Changan Automobile vehicles =

This is a list of current and former automobiles produced by Chinese central state-owned automaker China Changan Automobile Group Co., Ltd. (abbreviated as Changan Automobile), under its brands of Changan Auto, Deepal, Avatr and Changan Kaicene. The brands formerly used by the company include Oshan.

== Current models ==
=== Changan Auto ===
Image	Models	Chinese name	Introduction	Generation	Vehicle description
Sedan
	Eado	长安逸动	2012	3rd	Compact sedan, the third generation is renamed from Changan Lamore, ICE/HEV
	Raeton	长安锐程PLUS	2023	2nd	Mid-size sedan
	UNI-V	长安UNI-V	2022	1st	Compact sedan, ICE/HEV
SUV
	CS35 Plus	长安CS35 PLUS	2018	1st	Subcompact SUV
	CS55 Plus	长安CS55 PLUS	2017	2nd	Compact SUV, ICE/HEV
	CS75 Plus	长安CS75 PLUS	2013	3rd	Compact SUV, ICE/HEV
	CS75 Pro/X7 Plus	长安CS75 PRO/长安X7 PLUS	2019	1st	Mid-size SUV, rebadged from Oshan X7 Plus
	UNI-K	长安UNI-K	2021	1st	Mid-size SUV, ICE/PHEV
	UNI-T	长安UNI-T	2020	1st	Compact SUV, ICE/PHEV
	UNI-Z	长安UNI-Z	2024	1st	Compact SUV, rebadged from Oshan Z6, ICE/PHEV
	X5 Plus	长安X5 PLUS	2020	1st	Compact SUV, rebadged from Oshan X5
Pickup truck
	F70	长安F70	2019	1st	Mid-size pickup
	Hunter	长安猎手	2024	1st	Mid-size pickup, ICE/PHEV(EREV)
	Lantuozhe	长安览拓者	2023	1st	Mid-size pickup, ICE/BEV

==== Changan Nevo ====
Image	Models	Chinese name	Introduction	Generation	Vehicle description
City car
	Lumin	长安Lumin	2022	1st	City car, BEV
Sedan
	Nevo A05L	长安启源A05L	to commence	1st	Mid-size sedan, BEV
	Nevo A06	长安启源A06	2025	1st	Mid-size sedan, BEV/PHEV(EREV)
	Nevo A07	长安启源A07	2023	1st	Mid-size sedan, BEV/PHEV(EREV)
SUV
	Nevo E07	长安启源E07	2025	1st	Mid-size SUV-based pickup, BEV/PHEV(EREV)
	Nevo Q05	长安启源Q05	2025	2nd	Compact SUV, BEV
	Nevo Q06	长安启源Q06	2026	1st	Mid-size SUV, BEV/PHEV(EREV)
	Nevo Q07	长安启源Q07	2025	1st	Mid-size SUV, PHEV(EREV)
Pickup truck
	Hunter K50	长安猎手K50	2025	1st	Mid-size pickup, PHEV(EREV)

=== Deepal ===
Image	Models	Chinese name	Introduction	Generation	Vehicle description
Sedan
	L06	深蓝L06	2025	1st	Mid-size sedan, BEV/PHEV(EREV)
	SL03 L07	深蓝SL03 深蓝L07	2022 2024	1st	Mid-size sedan, BEV/PHEV(EREV)
SUV
	G318	深蓝G318	2024	1st	Mid-size SUV, PHEV(EREV)
	S05	深蓝S05	2024	1st	Subcompact SUV, BEV/PHEV(EREV)
	S07	深蓝S07	2023	1st	Compact SUV, BEV/PHEV(EREV)
	S09	深蓝S09	2025	1st	Full-size SUV, PHEV(EREV)

=== Avatr ===
Image	Models	Chinese name	Introduction	Generation	Vehicle description
Sedan
	06	阿维塔06	2025	1st	Mid-size sedan, BEV/PHEV(EREV)
	12	阿维塔12	2023	1st	Mid-size sedan, BEV/PHEV(EREV)
Station Wagon
	06T	阿维塔06T	2028	1st	Mid-size wagon, BEV/PHEV(EREV)
SUV
	07 07L	阿维塔07 阿维塔07L	2024 2026	1st	Mid-size SUV, BEV/PHEV(EREV)
	11	阿维塔11	2022	1st	Mid-size SUV, BEV/PHEV(EREV)
	T09	阿维塔T09	2026	1st	Full-size SUV, PHEV(EREV)

=== Changan Kaicheng ===
Image	Models	Chinese name	Introduction	Generation	Vehicle description
MPV
	Honor S	长安凯程欧诺S	2012	1st	Compact MPV
Van
	Ruixing M60	长安睿行M60	2019	1st	Van
	Ruixing M80	长安睿行M80	2013	1st	Van
	Ruixing M90	长安睿行M90	2016	1st	Van
	Star 5	长安之星5	2012	1st	Microvan
	V919	长安凯程V919	2025	1st	Van, BEV
Pickup truck
	Shenqi T30	长安神骐T30	2020	1st	Pickup truck
	Star Truck	长安星卡	1999	1st	Pickup truck

== Discontinued models ==
=== Changan Auto ===
Image	Models	Chinese name	Introduction	Discontinued	Generation	Vehicle description
City car
	BenBen BenBen E-Star	长安奔奔 长安奔奔E-Star	2006 2020	2019 2023	2nd	City car BEV variant
Sedan
	Alsvin	长安悦翔	2009	2021	3rd	Subcompact sedan
	Alsvin V3	长安悦翔V3	2012	2017	1st	Subcompact sedan
	Alsvin V7/Eado DT	长安悦翔V7/逸动DT	2014	2022	2nd	Subcompact sedan, renamed from Alsvin V7 to Eado DT
	Eado XT/XT RS	长安逸动XT/XT RS	2013	2020	2nd	Compact hatchback variant of Changan Eado
	Raeton	长安睿骋	2012	2019	1st	Mid-size sedan
	Z-Shine/CX30 CX30	长安志翔 长安CX30	2008 2019	2012	1st	Compact sedan Compact hatchback variant
SUV
	CS35	长安CS35	2012	2022	1st	Subcompact SUV
	CS15	长安CS15	2016	2023	1st	Subcompact SUV
	CS85 Coupe	长安CS85 COUPE	2019	2025	1st	Mid-size coupe SUV
	CS95	长安CS95	2017	2025	1st	Full-size SUV
MPV
	CX20	长安CX20	2010	2016	1st	MPV
	CM7	长安CM7	2003	2008	1st	MPV
	CM8	长安CM8	2004	2008	1st	MPV
	Eulove	长安欧力威	2013	2018	1st	MPV
	Joice	长安杰勋	2007	2009	1st	MPV
	Linmax	长安凌轩	2017	2020	1st	MPV

==== Changan Nevo ====
Image	Models	Chinese name	Introduction	Discontinued	Generation	Vehicle description
Sedan
	Nevo A05	长安启源A05	2023	2026	1st	Compact sedan, PHEV variant of Changan Eado/Yida
SUV
	Nevo Q05	长安启源Q05	2023	2026	1st	Compact SUV, PHEV(EREV)

=== Oshan ===
Image	Models	Chinese name	Introduction	Discontinued	Generation	Vehicle description
City car
	Niou II	欧尚尼欧II	2019	2020	1st	City car
Sedan
	Qiyue	欧尚启悦	2022	2023	1st	Subcompact sedan, rebadged Suzuki Ciaz
SUV
	COS1°	欧尚科赛	2018	2021	1st	Mid-size SUV
	COS3°	欧尚科赛3	2019	2021	1st	Subcompact SUV, rebadged Changan CS15
	COS5°	欧尚科赛5	2019	2022	1st	Subcompact SUV, rebadged Changan CS35
	CX70/CX70T	欧尚CX70/CX70T	2016	2019	1st	Mid-size SUV
	X70A	欧尚X70A	2017	2022	1st	Compact SUV
	X5/ X5 Plus	欧尚X5 /X5 PLUS	2020	2024	1st	Compact SUV, rebadged to Changan X5
	X7/ X7 Plus	欧尚X7 /X7 PLUS	2019	2024	1st	Mid-size SUV, rebadged to Changan X7
	Z6	欧尚Z6	2021	2024	1st	Compact SUV, rebadged to Changan UNI-Z
MPV
	Changxing/A600	欧尚长行	2016	2022	1st	compact MPV
	Cosmos	欧尚科尚	2018	2022	1st	compact MPV
	A800	欧尚A800	2017	2020	1st	compact MPV, rebadged Changan Linmax

=== Changan Kaicheng ===
Image	Models	Chinese name	Introduction	Discontinued	Generation	Vehicle description
MPV
	Ruixing S50	长安睿行S50	2016	2019	1st	Compact MPV
	Ruixing S50T	长安睿行S50T	2018	2019	1st	Compact MPV
Van
	Ruixing M70	长安睿行M70	2017	2020	1st	Van
	Star	长安之星	1999	2014	1st	Microvan
	Star 2	长安之星2	2007	2012	1st	Microvan
	Star 3	长安之星3	2015	2016	1st	Microvan
	Star 4500/Star 9	长安星光4500/之星9	2012	2021	1st	Microvan
	Star S460	长安之星S460	2008	2015	1st	Microvan
	Taurustar/Star 7	长安金牛星/之星7	2010	2015	1st	Microvan
	Zunxing	长安尊行	2013	2016	1st	Van
Pickup truck
	Shenqi F30/F300	长安神骐F30/凯程F300	2016	2025	1st	Pickup truck
	Shenqi T20	长安神骐T20	1999	2014	1st	Pickup truck
