= X70 =

X70 may refer to:

== Aircraft ==
- NASA X-70 Fractal, a proposed research aircraft

== Automobiles ==
- Jetour X70, a 2018–present Chinese mid-size SUV
- Lifan X70, a 2018–present Chinese compact SUV
- Oshan X70A, a 2017–present Chinese compact SUV
- Proton X70, a 2019–present Malaysian compact SUV
- Toyota Chaser (X70), a 1984–1988 Japanese mid-size sedan
- Toyota Cresta (X70), a 1984–1988 Japanese mid-size sedan
- Toyota Mark II (X70), a 1984–1988 Japanese mid-size car

== Electronics ==
- Canon EOS Kiss X70, a digital single-lens reflex camera
- Fujifilm X70, a digital compact camera
- Toshiba Qosmio X70 series, a laptop
- Viliv X70, an ultra-mobile PC

== See also ==
- X7 (disambiguation)
