= Ruixing =

Ruixing may refer to:

- Changan cars:
  - Changan Ruixing M80
  - Changan Ruixing M90
  - Changan Ruixing S50
- Ruìxìng, Another transliteration of Luckin Coffee
