= 7X =

7X or 7-X may refer to:

- 7x, or seven times in multiplication
- Dassault Falcon 7X, an aircraft
- Saab 9-7X, an SUV
- Wendelstein 7-X, an experimental stellarator
- Zeekr 7X, an electric SUV
- Merchandise 7X; see Coca-Cola formula
- Avenged 7X, nickname for Avenged Sevenfold
- Spartan 7X Executive; see Spartan Executive

== See also ==
- X7 (disambiguation)
