= Kaicene V919 =

Battery electric van

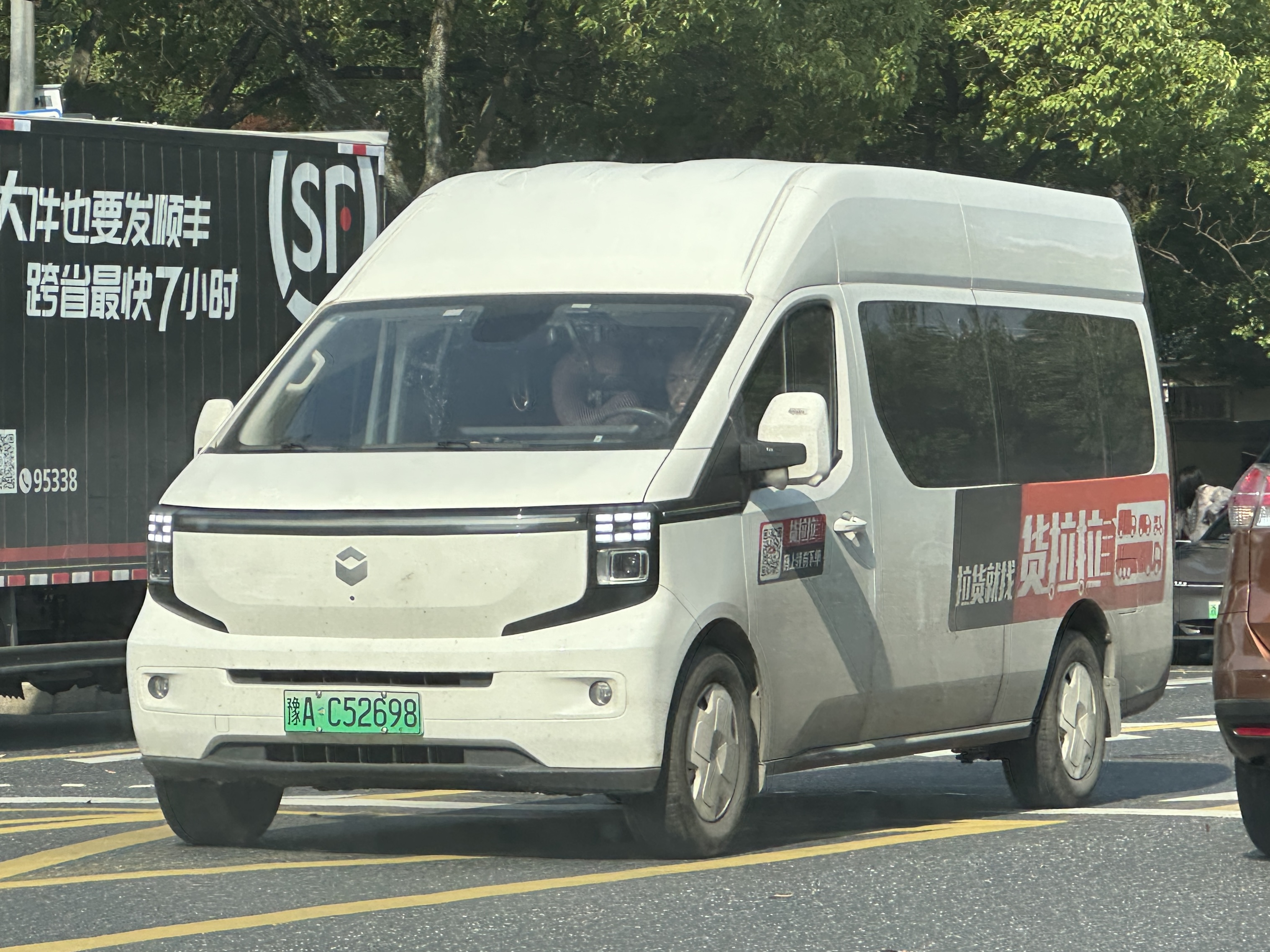

Overview
- Manufacturer: Changan (Kaicene)
- Also called: Golden Dragon 929
- Production: 2025–present
- Assembly: China: Hebei

Body and chassis
- Class: Light commercial vehicle
- Body style: 5-door van
- Layout: Rear-motor, rear-wheel-drive
- Platform: K01 new energy intelligent architecture

Dimensions
- Wheelbase: 3,500 mm (137.8 in)
- Length: 5,495 mm (216.3 in); 3,380 mm (133.1 in)
- Width: 1,910 mm (75.2 in); 1,740 mm (68.5 in)
- Height: 2,380 mm (93.7 in); 1,750 mm (68.9 in)
- Curb weight: 1,700 kg (3,748 lb)

The Kaicene V919 (Chinese: 长安凯程V919) is a battery electric van produced by Chinese auto manufacturer Changan under the Changan Kaicene brand.

== Overview ==
The Kaicene V919 is built on Changan Kaicene's self-developed new energy intelligent architecture K01, featuring a peak torque of 360N·m. The platform comes standard with a brake-by-wire system, achieving a pressure build-up speed of 50% and an energy recovery efficiency of 26%. The range is 500km.

Rear view
