= Chana Star 9 =

Chinese automobile

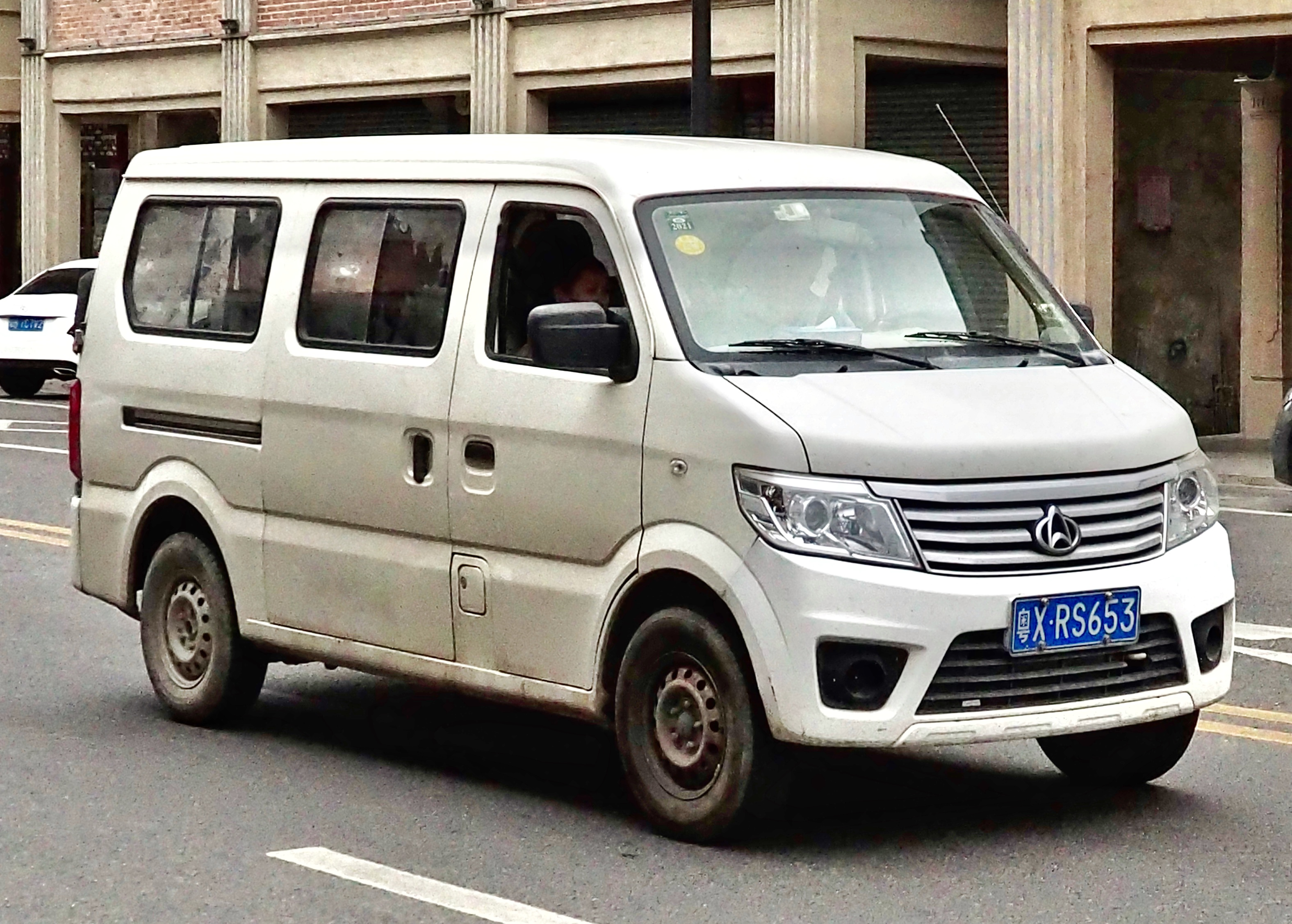
- Chana Star 9

Overview
- Manufacturer: Changan Automobile
- Also called: Chana Xingguang (Star) 4500; Teraco Tera-V (Vietnam)
- Production: 2012–present
- Model years: 2012–present

Body and chassis
- Class: Microvan
- Body style: 5-door wagon
- Layout: Mid-engine, rear-wheel-drive

Powertrain
- Engine: Mitsubishi 4G13S1 1.3L (1299cc) L4 (Star 4600); Mitsubishi 4G15S petrol 1.5L (1299cc) L4 (Star 9)
- Transmission: 5-speed manual

Dimensions
- Wheelbase: 2,800 mm (110.2 in)
- Length: 4,390 mm (172.8 in) (Star 4600); 4,430 mm (174.4 in) (Star 9)
- Width: 1,655 mm (65.2 in)
- Height: 1,935 mm (76.2 in)

The Chana Star 9 (长安之星9) is a microvan produced by Changan Automobile under the Chana sub-brand.

== Overview ==
Originally called the Chana Star 4500 (长安星光4500), the Chana microvan was renamed after the 2014 facelift and was sold as the Chana Star 9 within the Chana Star series lineup. The original Chana Star 4500 was released by Changan Automobile back in 2013. The Chana Star 9 microvan is powered by a 1.5 liter engine and the previous Chana Star 4500 was powered by a 1.3 liter engine.

Prices for the Star 4500 ranges from 50,900 yuan to 58,800 yuan, while prices for the Star 9 ranges from 47,800 yuan to 56,000 yuan.

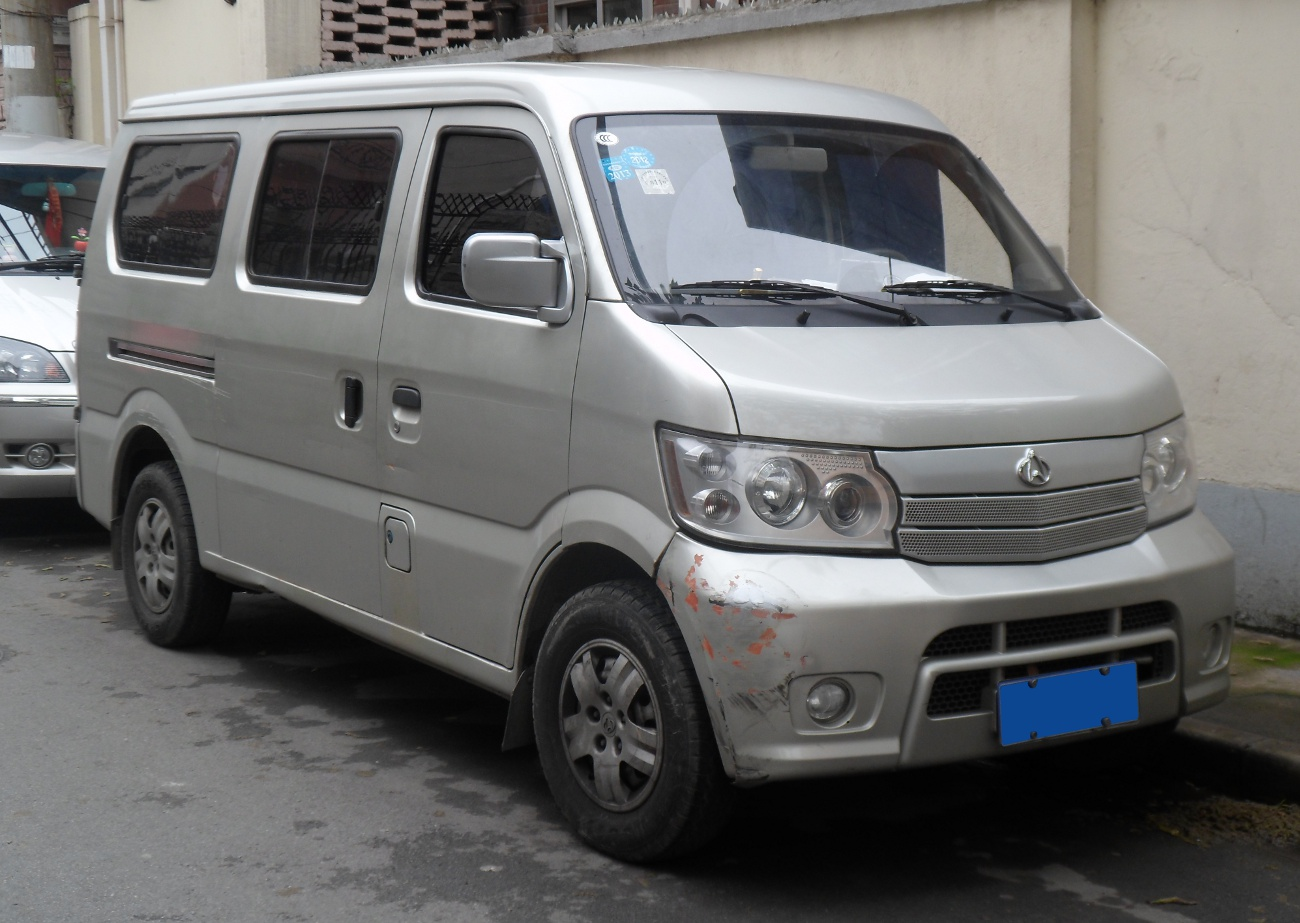
Chana Star 4500

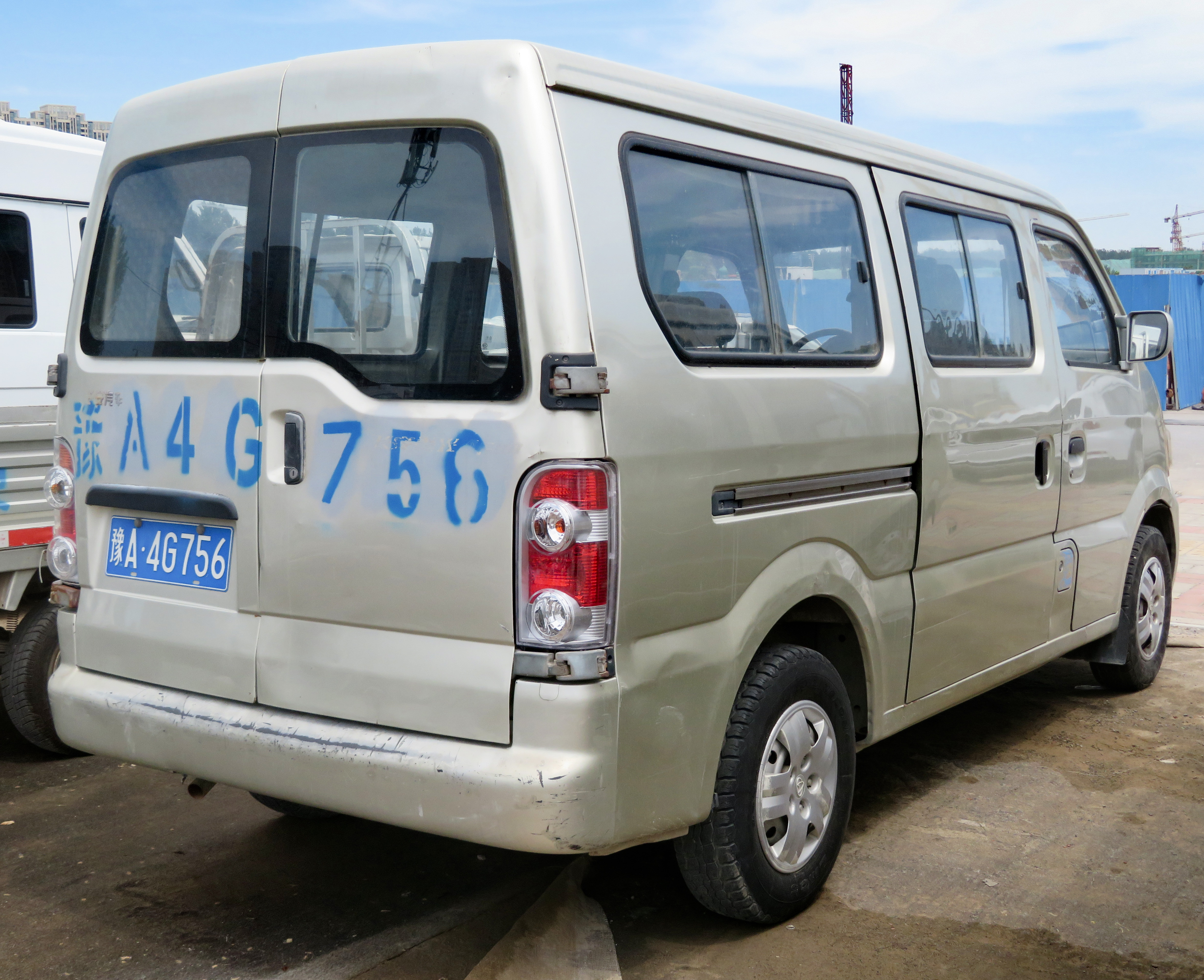
Chana Star 4500 (rear view)

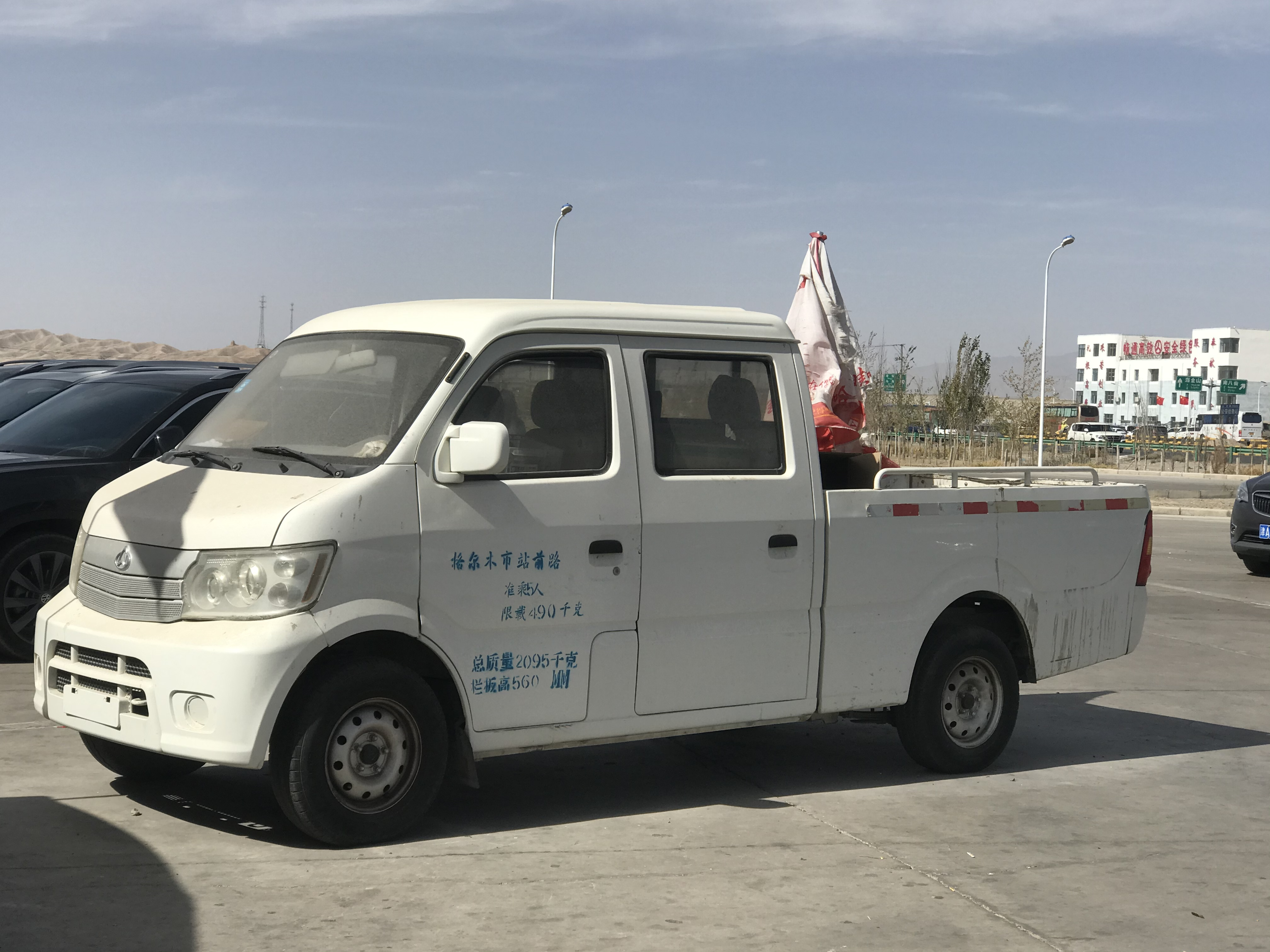
Chana Star 4500 pickup variant

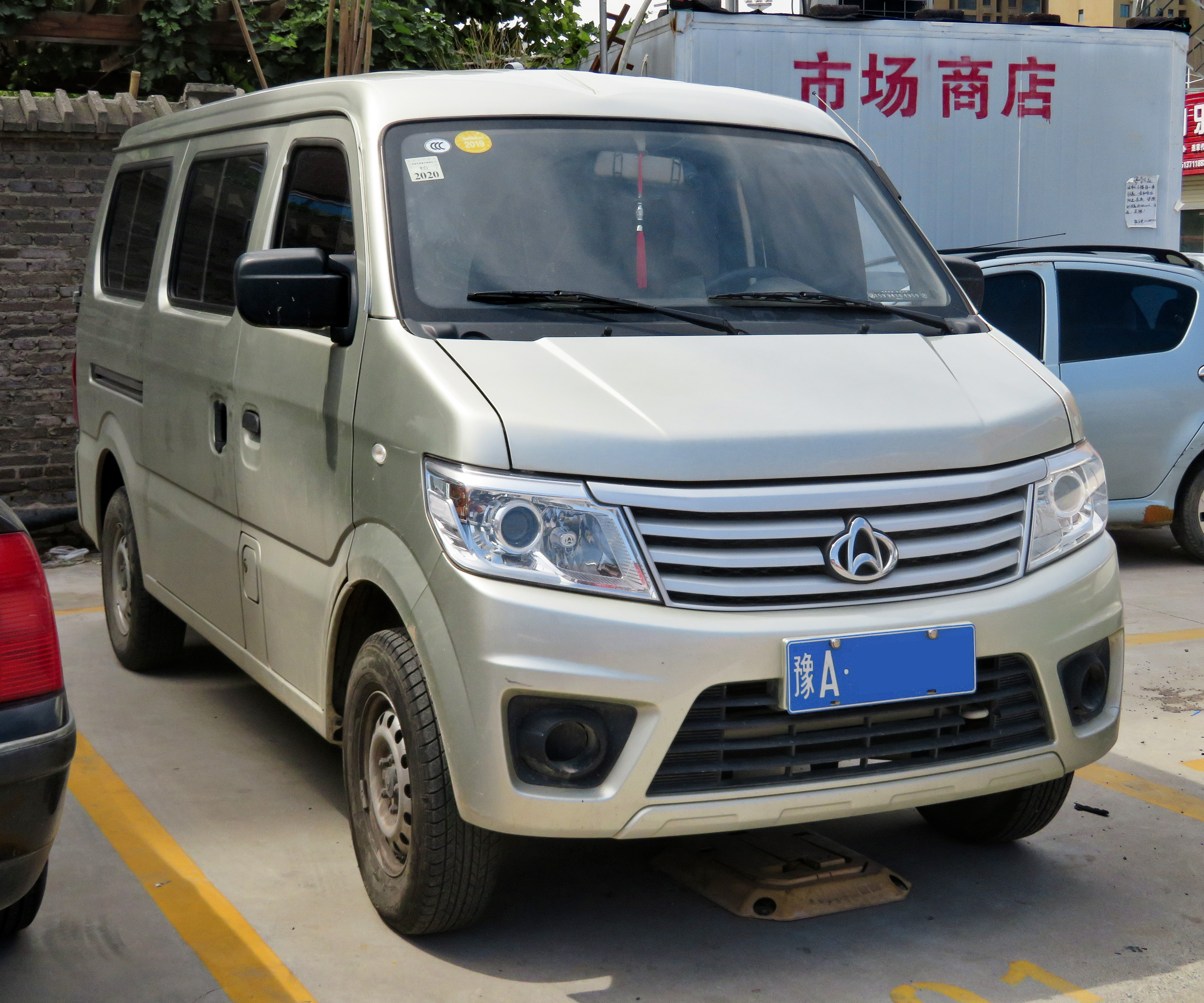
Chana Star 9

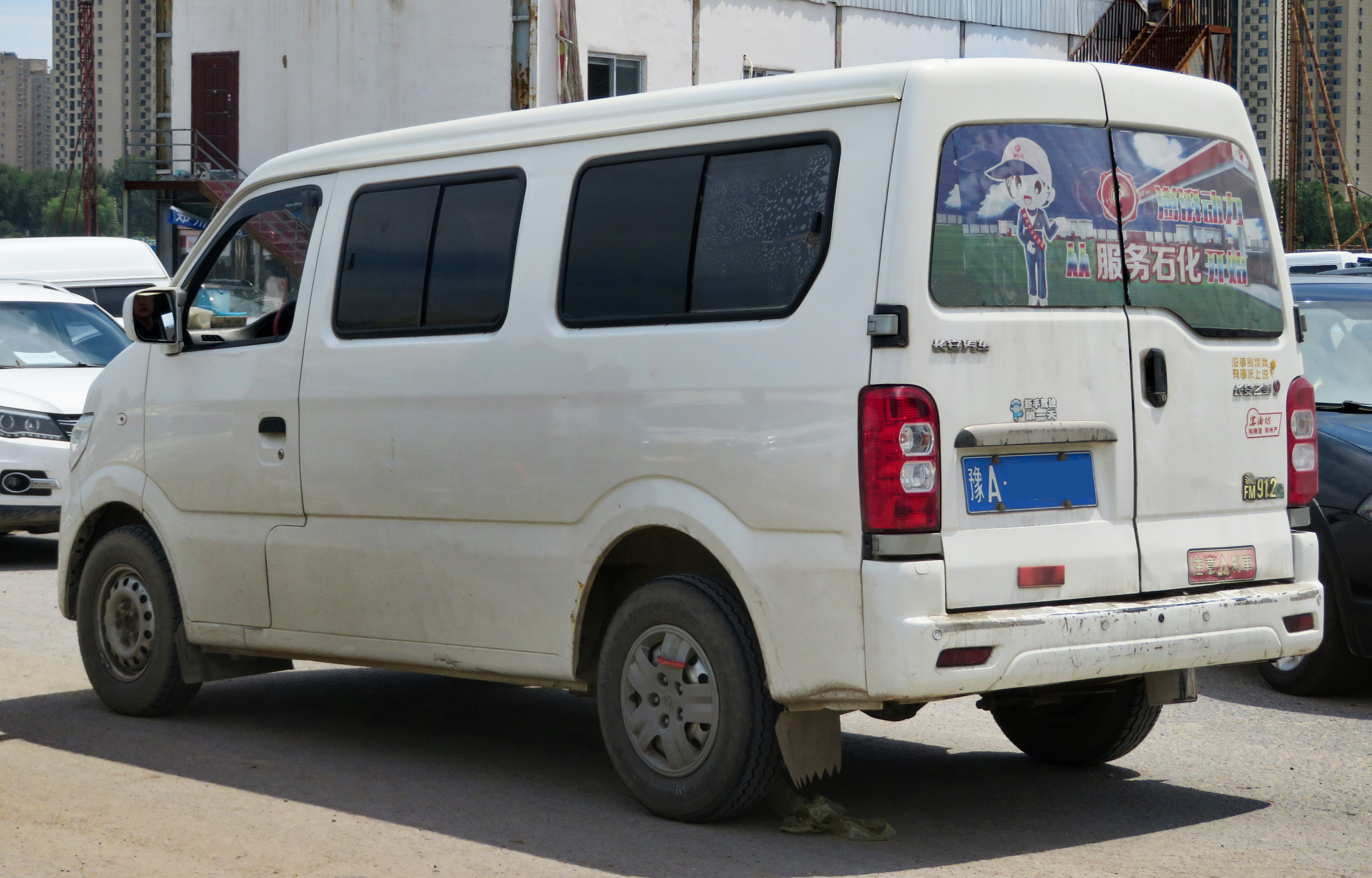
Chana Star 9 (rear view)
