= Chana CM7 =

Chinese microvan

Changan CM7
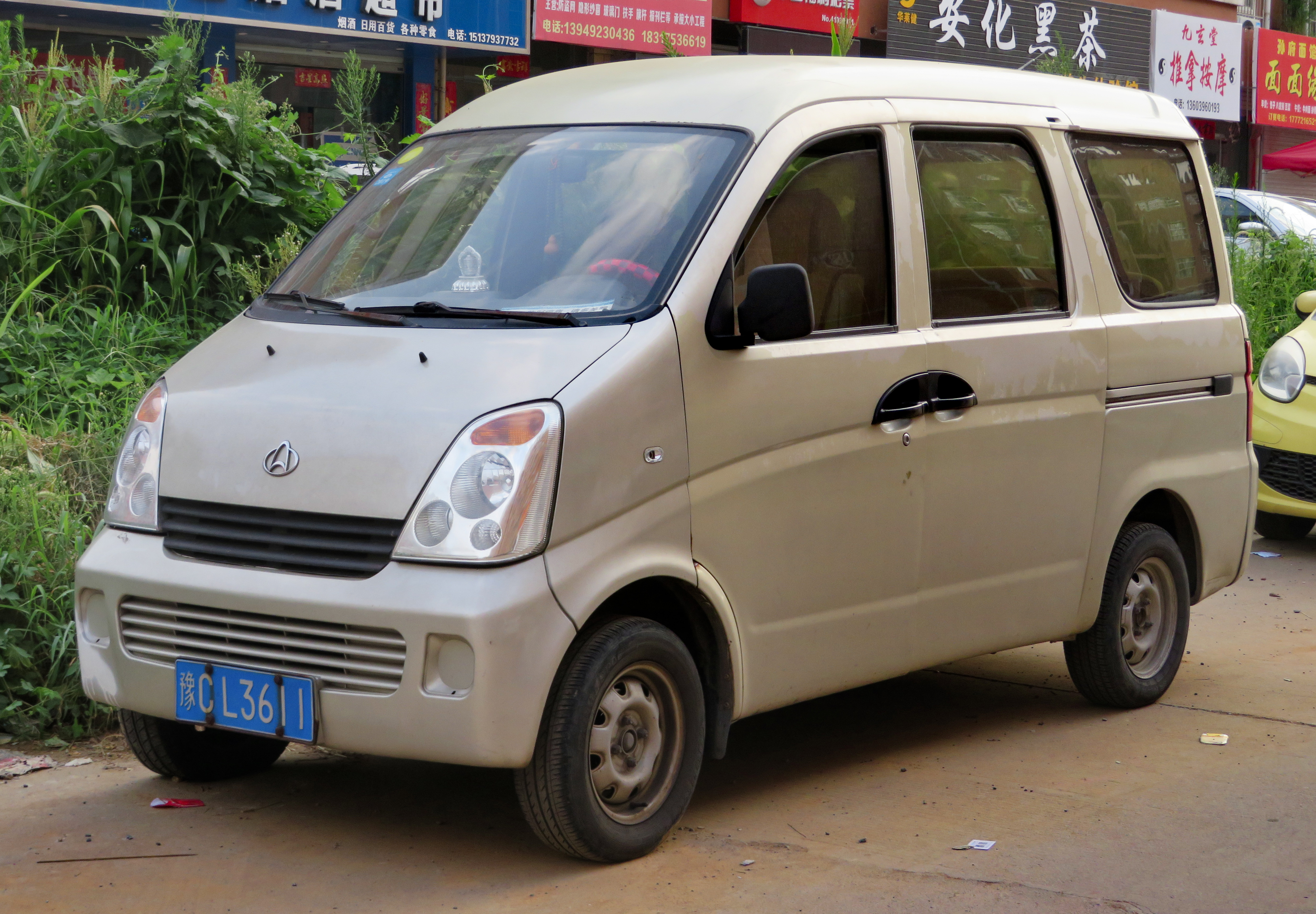
- Changan CM7

Overview
- Manufacturer: Changan Automobile
- Production: 2003–2015
- Model years: 2003–2015
- Designer: Marco Raimondi of I.E.G

Body and chassis
- Class: Microvan
- Body style: 5-door wagon
- Layout: Front-engine, front-wheel-drive

Powertrain
- Engine: 1.3 L I4 (petrol); 1.0 L I4 (petrol)
- Transmission: 5-speed manual

Dimensions
- Wheelbase: 2,430 mm (95.7 in)
- Length: 3,826 mm (150.6 in)
- Width: 1,515 mm (59.6 in)
- Height: 1,924 mm (75.7 in)

The Chana CM7 or Chana Raimondi (Leimeng, 长安镭蒙) is a microvan produced by Changan Automobile.

== Overview ==
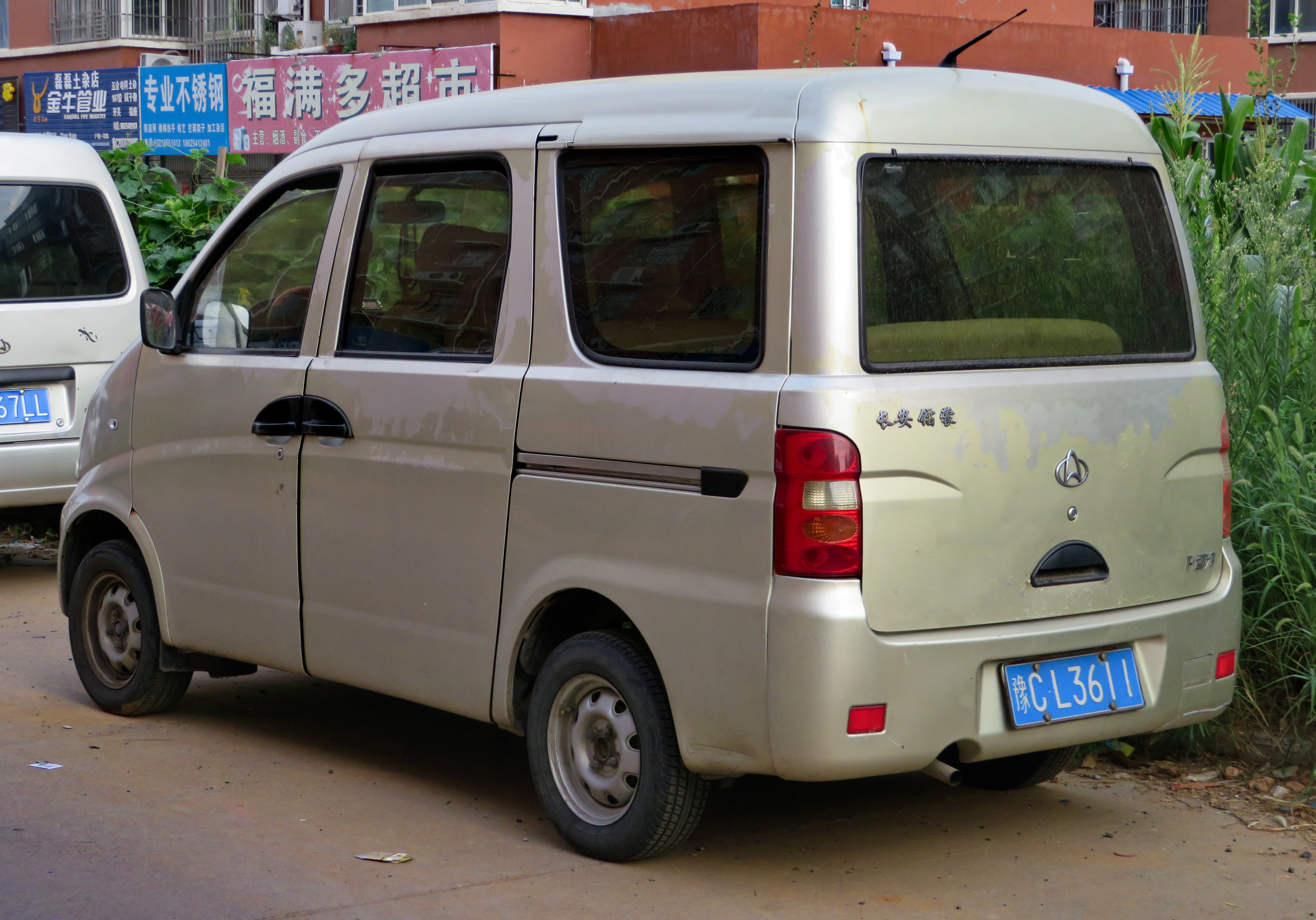
2004 Chang'an Leimeng (Raimondi, CM7), rear

Chongqing Changan Automobile introduced the Chana CM7 minivan on November 23, 2003.

Code-named CM7, and also named Leimeng, the name of the van actually came from its Italian-designer, Raimondi from I.E.G. The official designation of the van is SC6380, and it is also the first self-developed minivan from Changan Automobile which was previously only produces license-built Suzuki Altos and minivans.

The Chana CM7 rides on a completely new platform at the time and is powered by Suzuki-derived 1.0-liter and 1.3-liter engines producing 39 kW and 60 kW respectively. The CM7 also features standard air conditioning. Production of the CM7 microvan started in January 2004.
