= Changan CM8 =

Chinese microvan

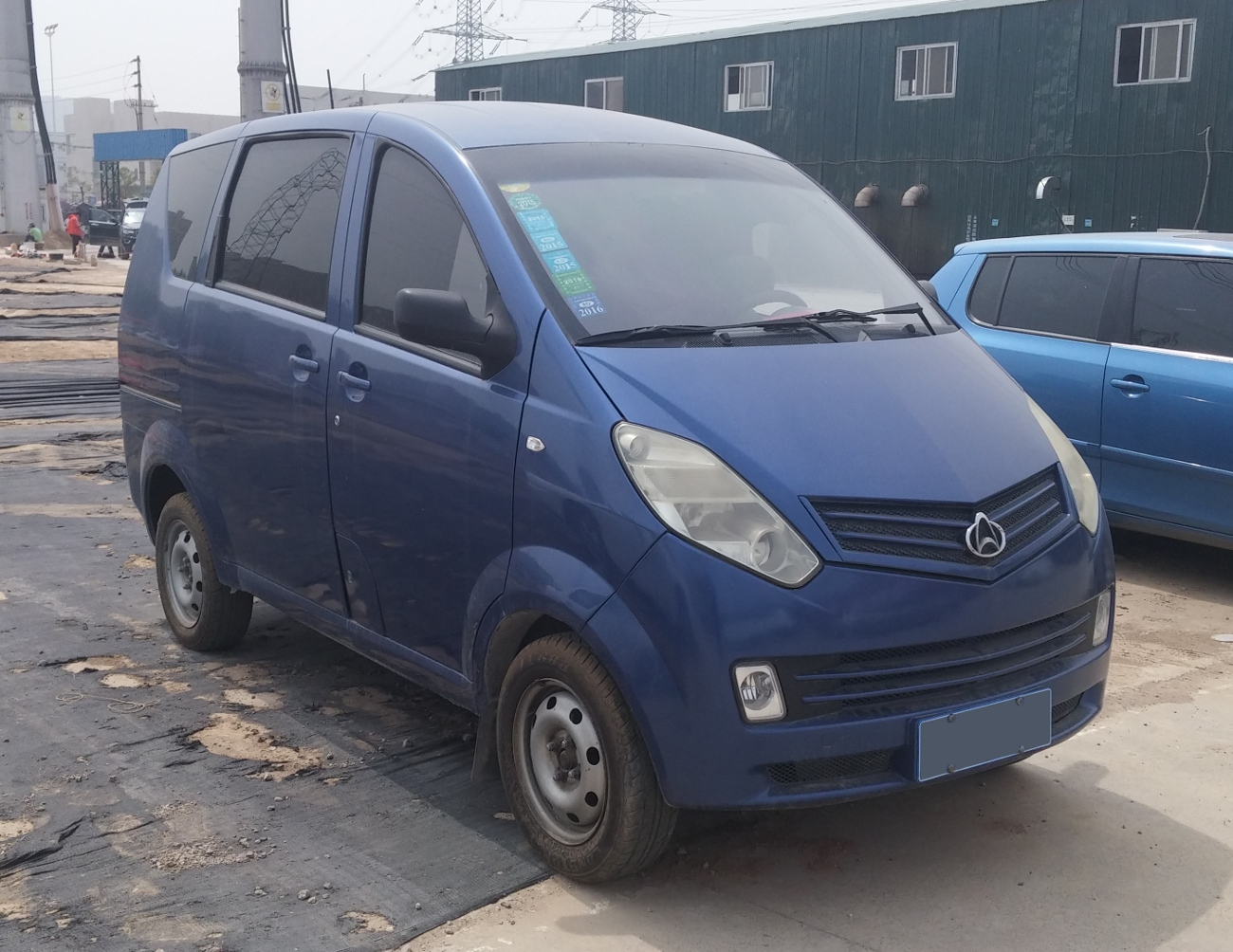
- Changan CM8

Overview
- Manufacturer: Changan Automobile
- Also called: Era CM8
- Production: 2004–2015
- Model years: 2004–2015
- Designer: I.D.E.A

Body and chassis
- Class: Microvan
- Body style: 5-door wagon
- Layout: Mid-engine, rear-wheel-drive

Powertrain
- Engine: 1.3 L I4 (petrol)
- Transmission: 5-speed manual

Dimensions
- Wheelbase: 2,430 mm (95.7 in)
- Length: 3,856 mm (151.8 in)
- Width: 1,568 mm (61.7 in)
- Height: 1,898 mm (74.7 in)

The Chana CM8 is a microvan produced by Changan Automobile.

== Overview ==
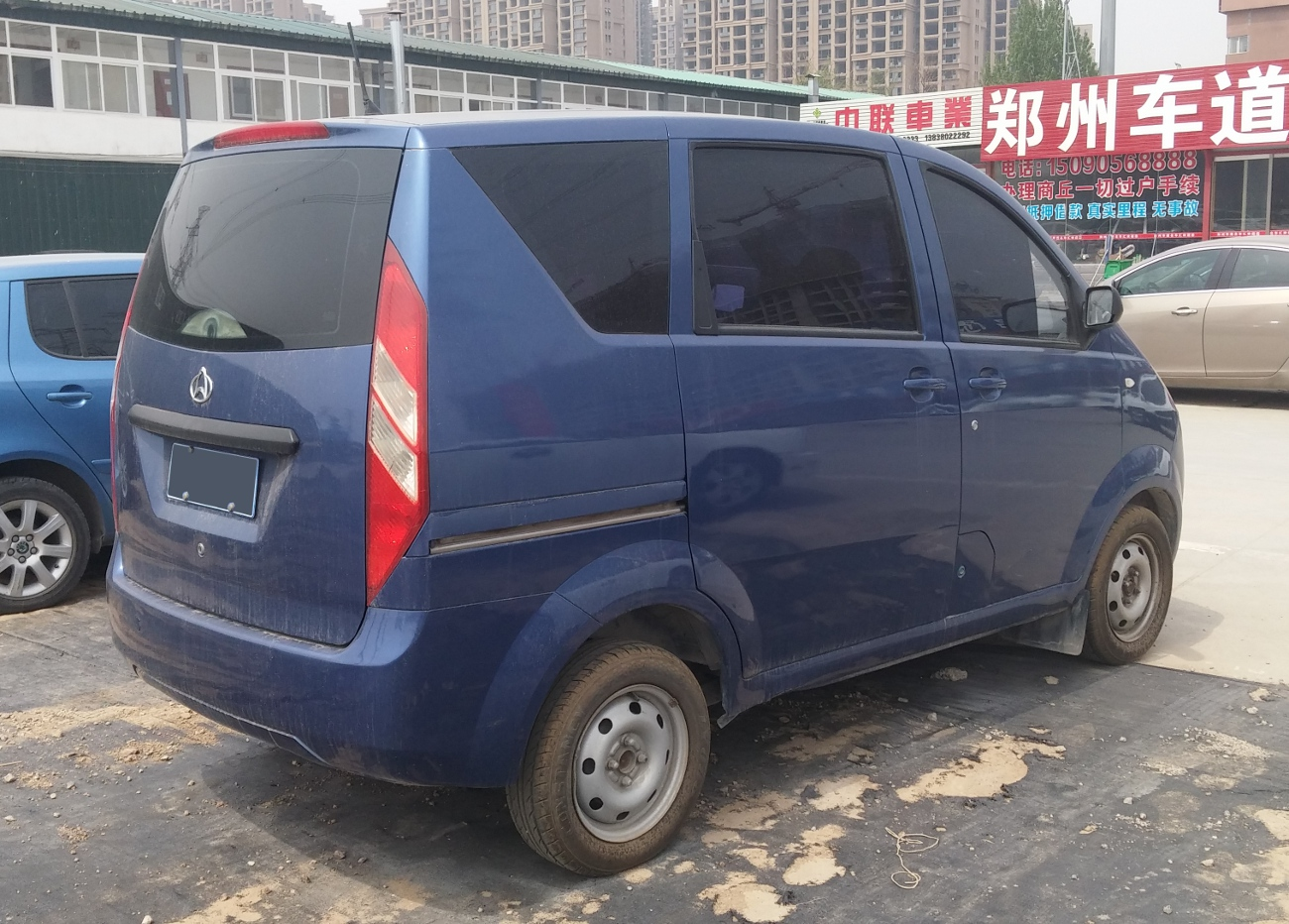
Chana CM8 rear

Previewed by the Changan CM8 concept during the 2004 Chengdu Auto Show, the Chana CM8 is a 7-seater city MPV built with a monocoque bodywork which the chassis and body are a single unit. The powertrain of the Chana CM8 features a 1310 cc petrol engine producing 60 kW or 81.6 bhp and 102 Nm of torque mated to a 5-speed manual transmission.
