= X7 =

X7 or X-7 may refer to:

== Arts, media, and entertainment ==
- Mega Man X7, the seventh game in the Mega Man X series
- WrestleMania X-Seven, seventeenth annual WrestleMania event in 2001

== Electronics ==
- Canon EOS Kiss X7, a digital SLR camera
- Nokia X7-00, a smartphone

== Transportation ==
=== Air transportation ===
- Chitaavia, a former Russian airline (IATA Code: X7)
- Lockheed X-7, an American experimental aircraft
- Ruhrstahl X-7, a German anti-tank missile of the Second World War

=== Automobiles ===
- BMW X7, 2018–present German full-size SUV
- Domy X7, 2016–2018 Chinese mid-size SUV
- Landwind X7, a 2015–2019 Chinese compact SUV
- Hanteng X7, a 2016–present Chinese mid-size SUV
- Oshan X7, a 2019–present Chinese mid-size SUV
- Sehol X7, a 2020–present Chinese mid-size SUV
- Beijing X7, a 2020–present Chinese mid-size SUV

=== Rail transportation ===
- SJ X7, a Swedish trainset

=== Bus services ===
- X7 Coastrider, a bus service in Scotland between Aberdeen and Perth

=== Watercraft ===
- HMS X7, a Royal Navy X class submarine

== See also ==
- 7X (disambiguation)
