= Kaicene Honor S =

Chinese automobile

Kaicene Honor
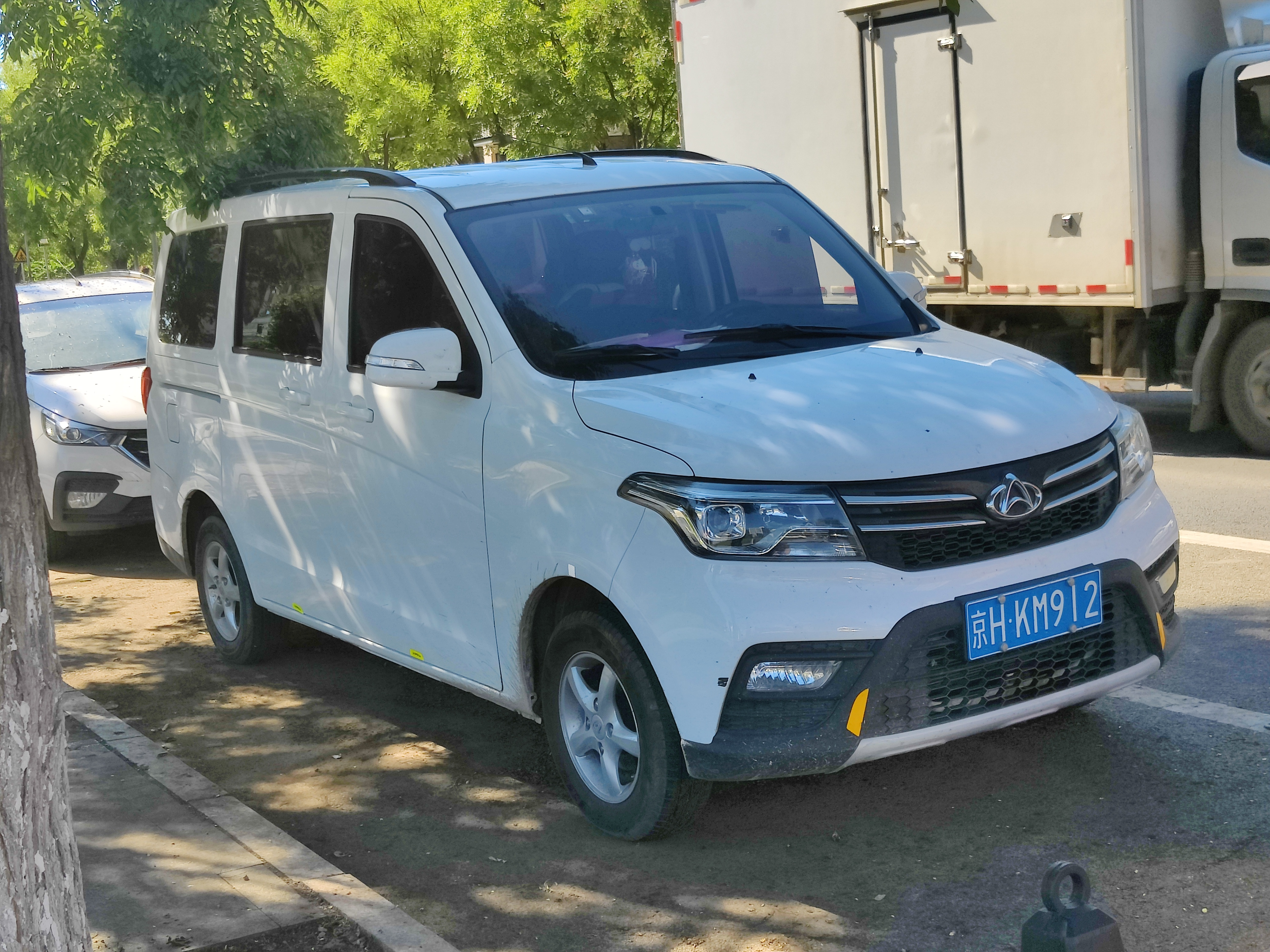
- Kaicene Honor S

Overview
- Manufacturer: Changan Automobile
- Also called: Oshan (Oushang/Chana) Honor
- Production: 2011–present
- Model years: 2012–present

Body and chassis
- Class: Compact MPV
- Body style: 5-door wagon
- Layout: Front-engine, front-wheel-drive

Powertrain
- Engine: 1.5 L EA15-AB I4 petrol); 1.5 L JL473QG I4 (petrol)
- Transmission: 5-speed manual

Dimensions
- Wheelbase: 2,750 mm (108.3 in)
- Length: 4,363 mm (171.8 in)
- Width: 1,680 mm (66.1 in)
- Height: 1,820 mm (71.7 in)

The Kaicene Honor S originally named the Oushang Honor or Oushang Ounuo (欧诺) is a 7-seater Compact MPV produced by Changan Automobile and originally sold under the Chana or Oushang brand and later the Kaicene brand.

== Overview ==
The Chana Honor debuted on the 2011 Guangzhou Auto Show and was launched on the Chinese auto market right after with prices ranging from 44,900 yuan to 60,900 yuan at launch. The Honor is manufactured by Chana, Changan's commercial division, also later known as Oushang.

Engines of the Chana Honor includes a 1.3 liter inline 4 petrol engine and a 1.5 liter inline 4 petrol engine, with both mated to a 5-speed manual gearbox.

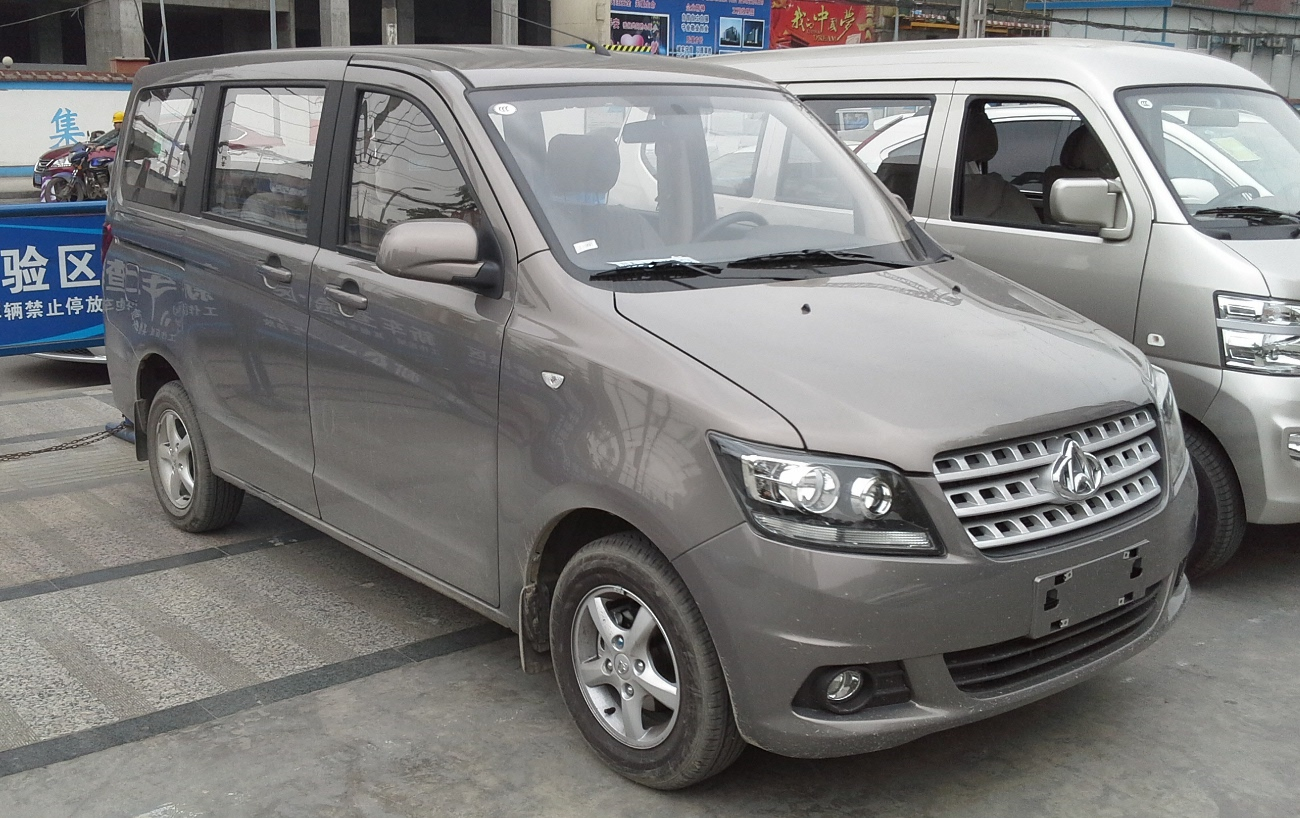
Original Chana Honor

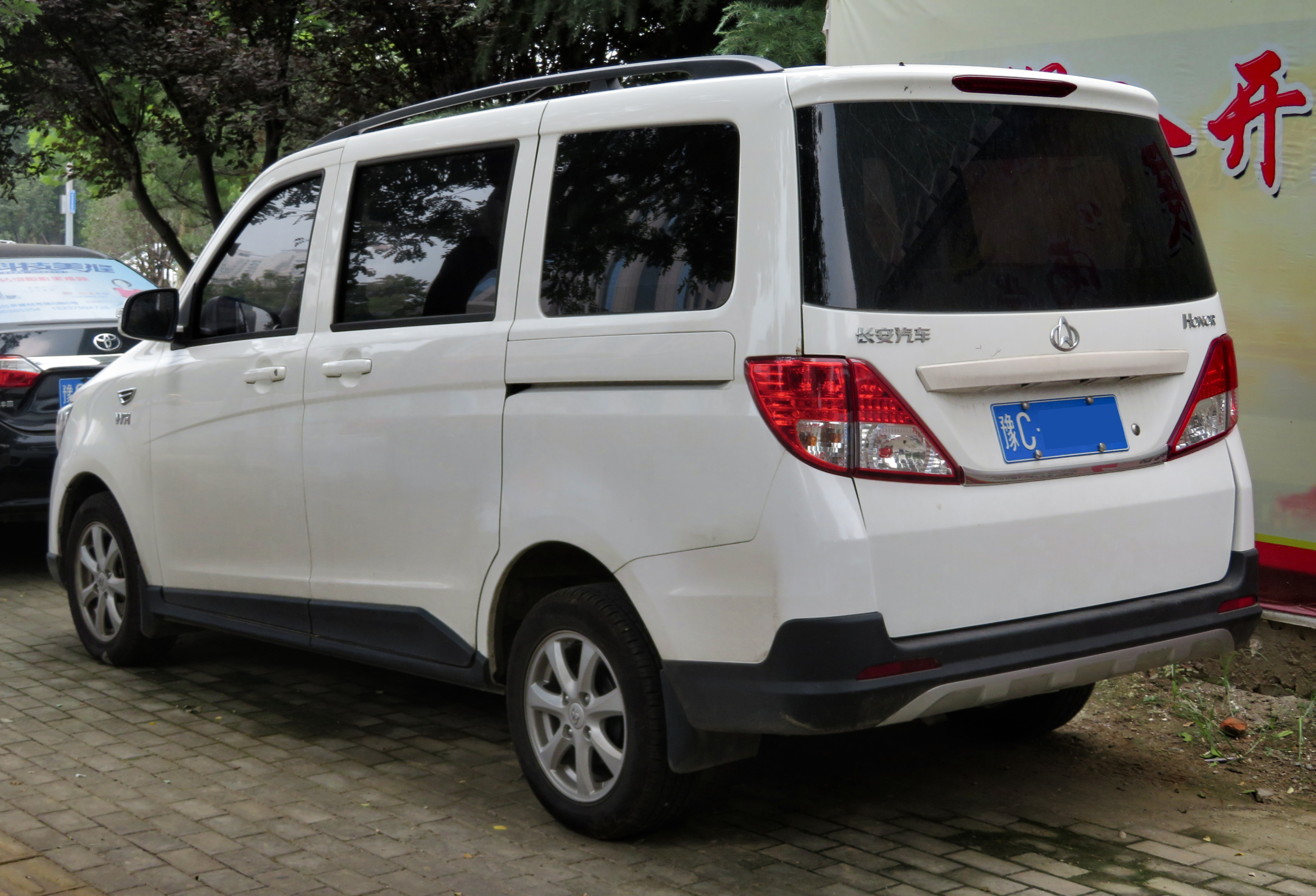
Chana Honor rear

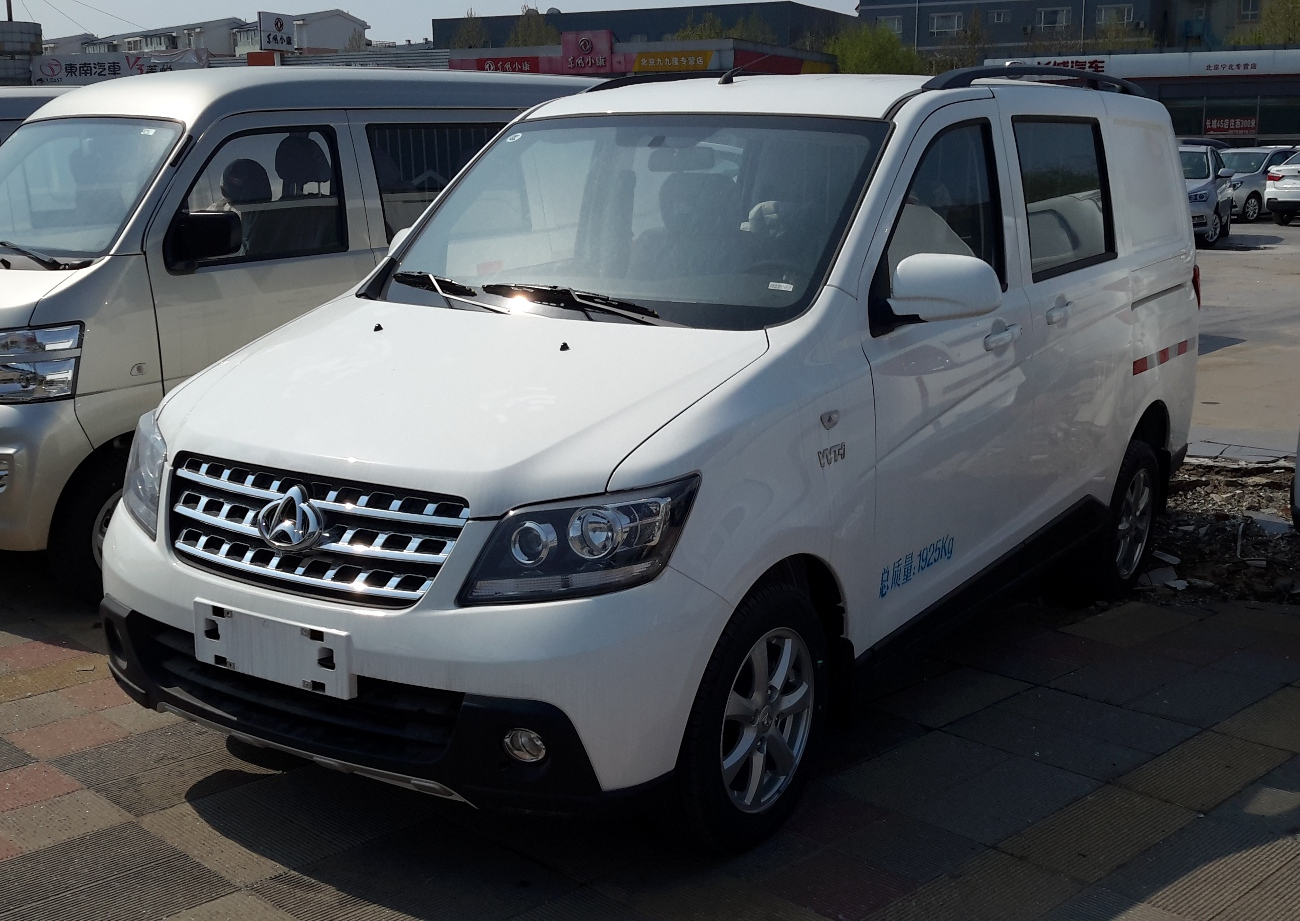
Chana Honor post-facelift panelvan in China

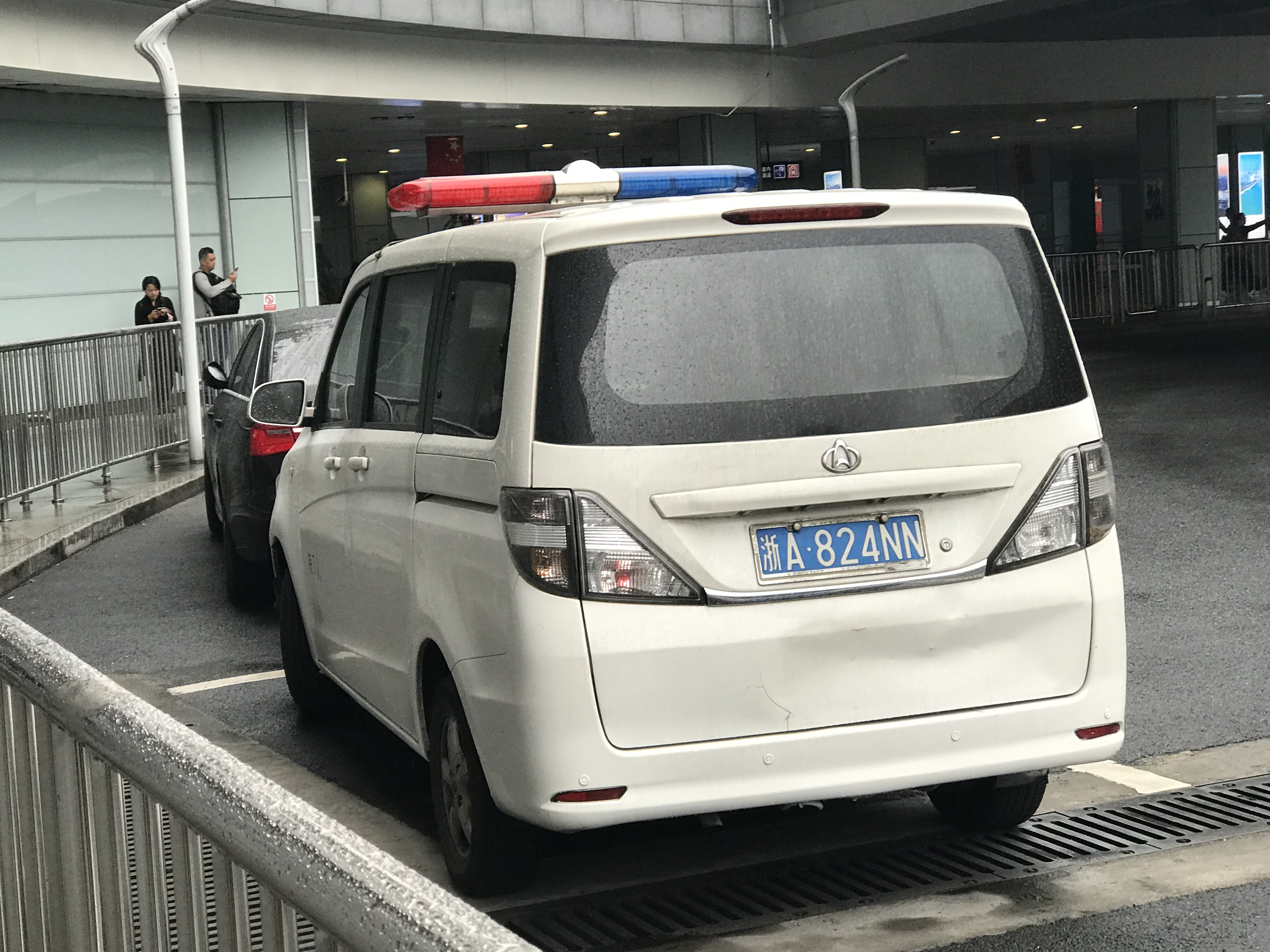
Rear view of a post-facelift Chana Honor (As a police cruiser in Hangzhou.)

== Oushang Honor S ==
An updated version called the Oushang Honor S was unveiled in December 2017, featuring a completely restyled front and rear end design and a redesigned interior. The price range of the Honor S has also been lowered compared to the previous Honor, with pricing ranging from 39,900 yuan to 55,900 yuan.

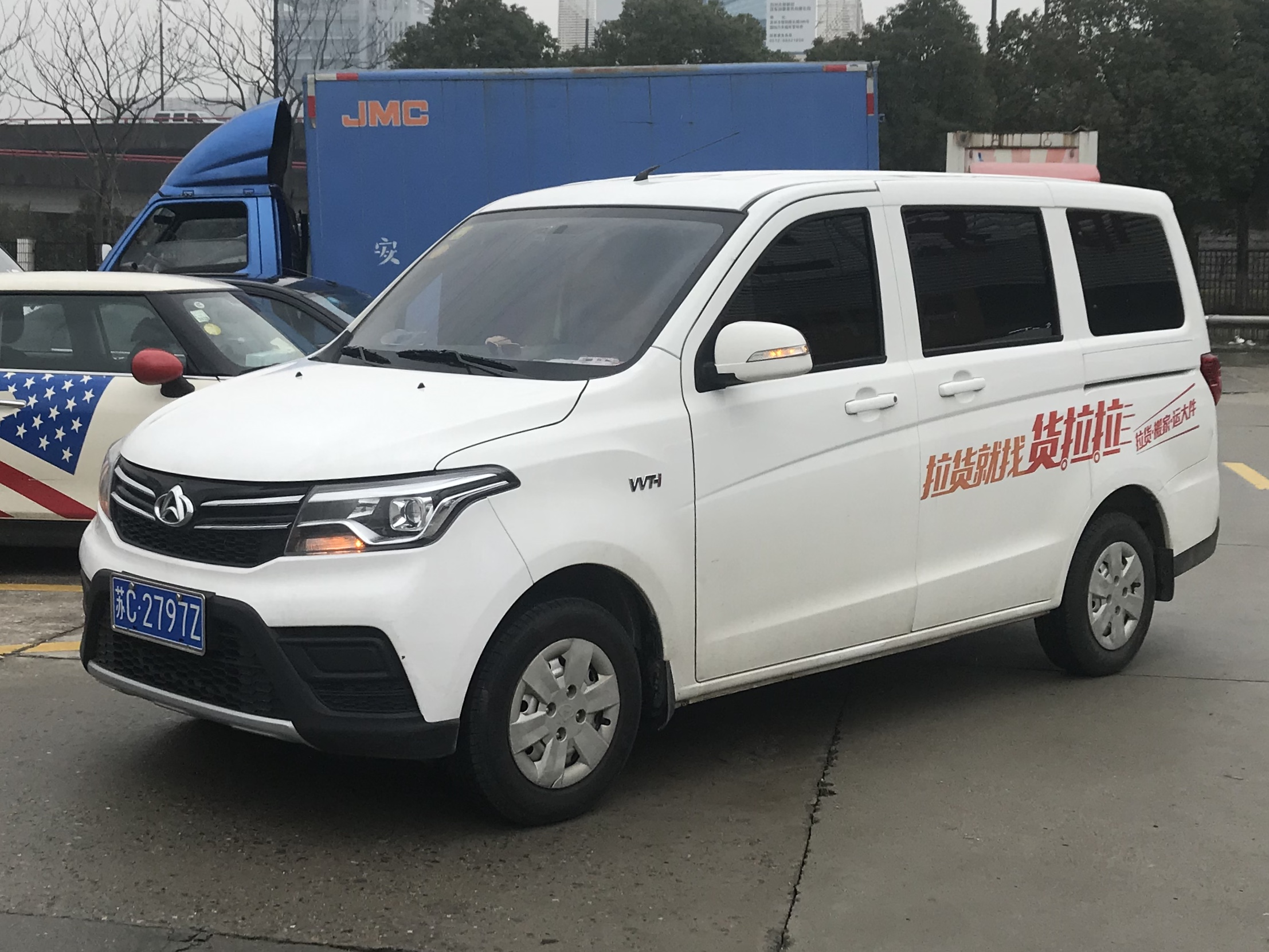
Chana Honor S front

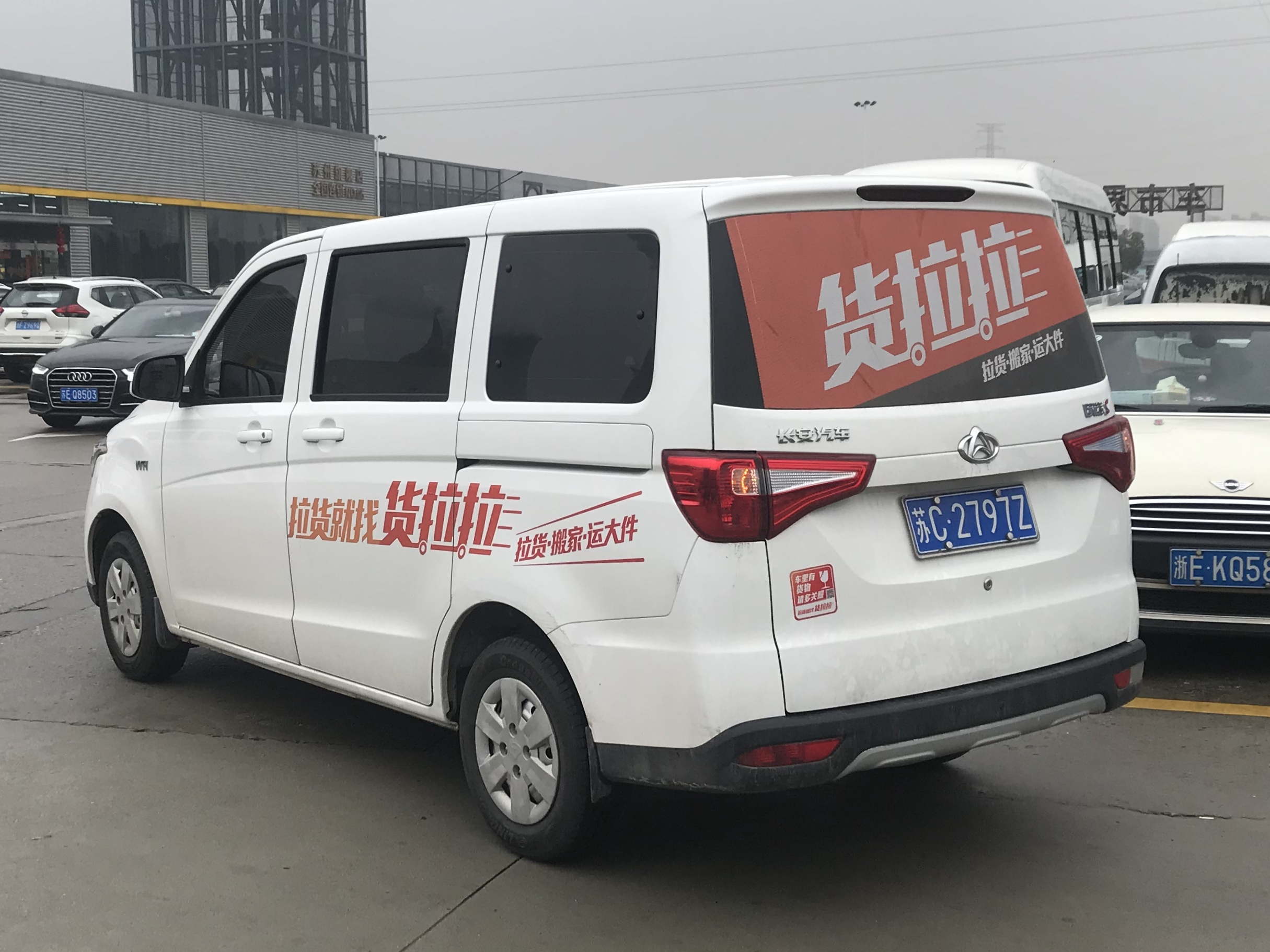
Chana Honor S rear
