= Changan Linmax =

Chinese compact MPV

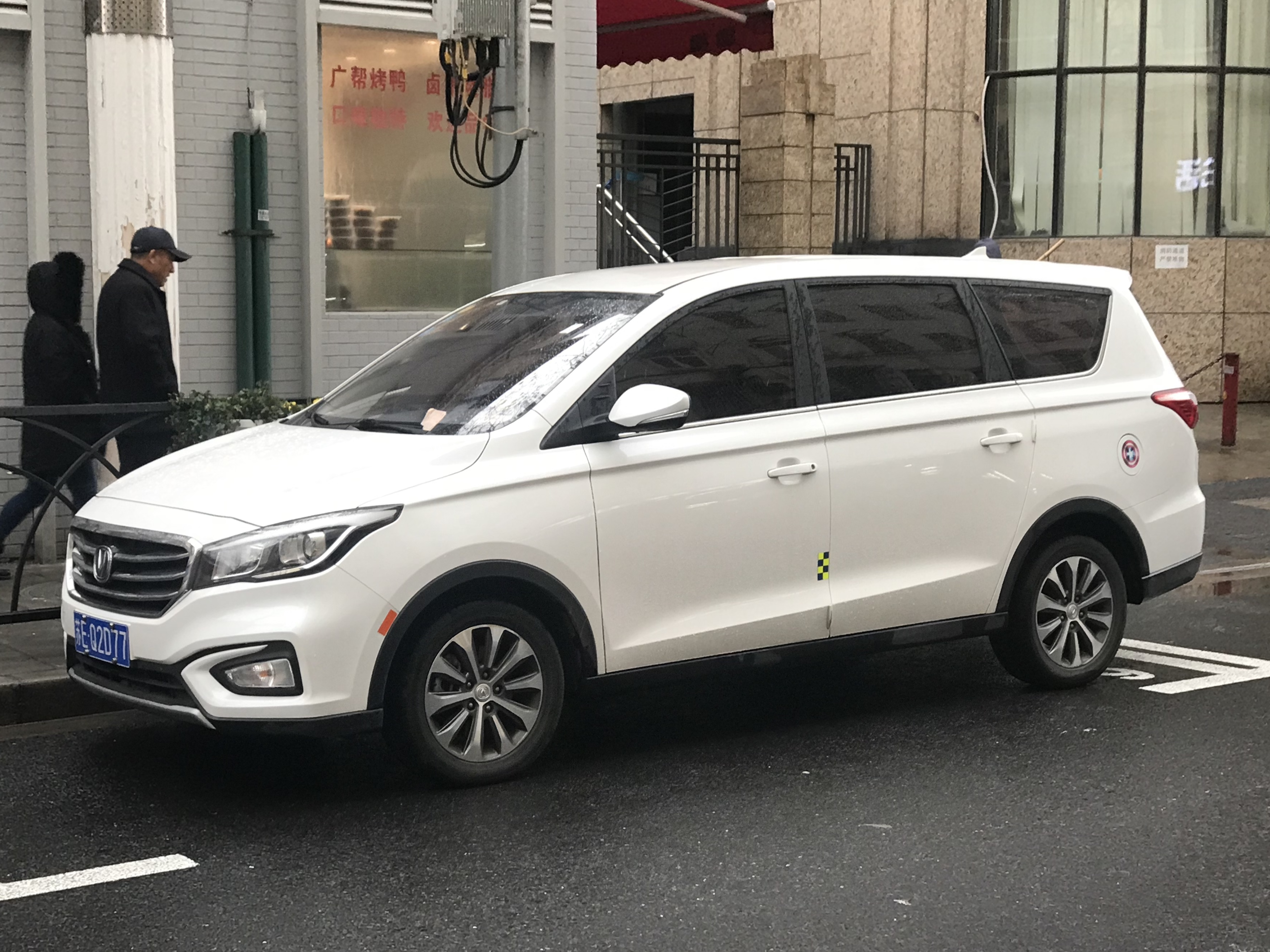
- Changan Linmax

Overview
- Manufacturer: Changan Automobile
- Also called: Changan A800; Changan Oushang A800
- Production: 2017–2020
- Model years: 2018–2019

Body and chassis
- Class: Compact MPV
- Body style: 5-door estate
- Layout: FF layout

Powertrain
- Engine: 1.5 L turbo I4 (petrol); 1.6 L I4 (petrol)
- Transmission: 6-speed manual 5-speed manual 6-speed automatic

Dimensions
- Wheelbase: 2,760 mm (108.7 in)
- Length: 4,730 mm (186.2 in)
- Width: 1,795 mm (70.7 in)
- Height: 1,730 mm (68.1 in)

The Changan Linmax or Changan Lingxuan (凌轩) is a 7-seater compact MPV produced by Changan Automobile.

== Overview ==
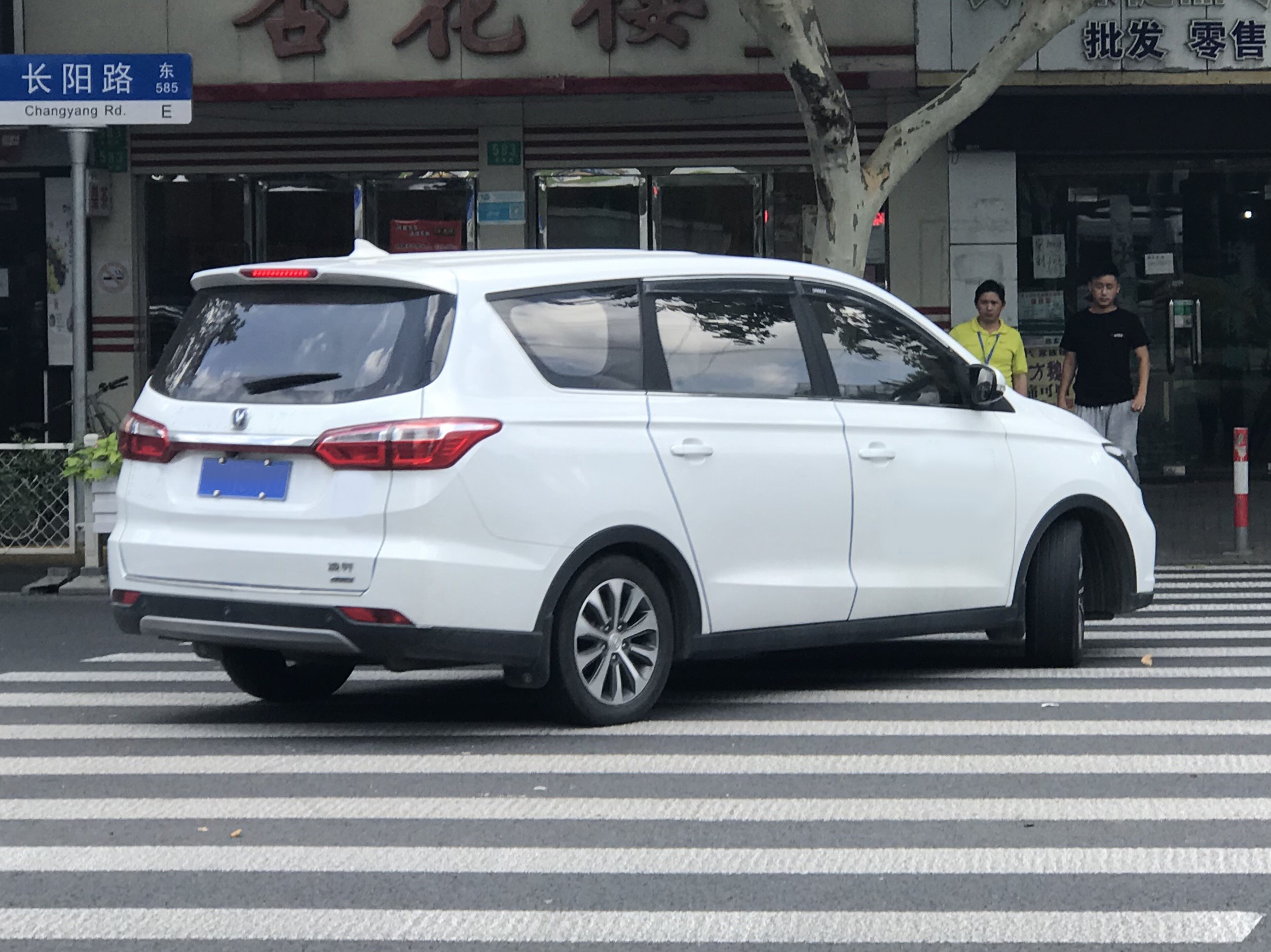
Changan Linmax rear

The Changan Linmax was launched on the Chinese car market in May 2017 with prices starting from 67,900 yuan and ending at 80,900 yuan.

== Oushang A800 ==
The Oushang A800 is a rebadged version of the Changan Linmax, with the Changan Lingxuan sold by Changan's passenger car division and the Oushang A800 sold by Oushang, which is their commercial division.

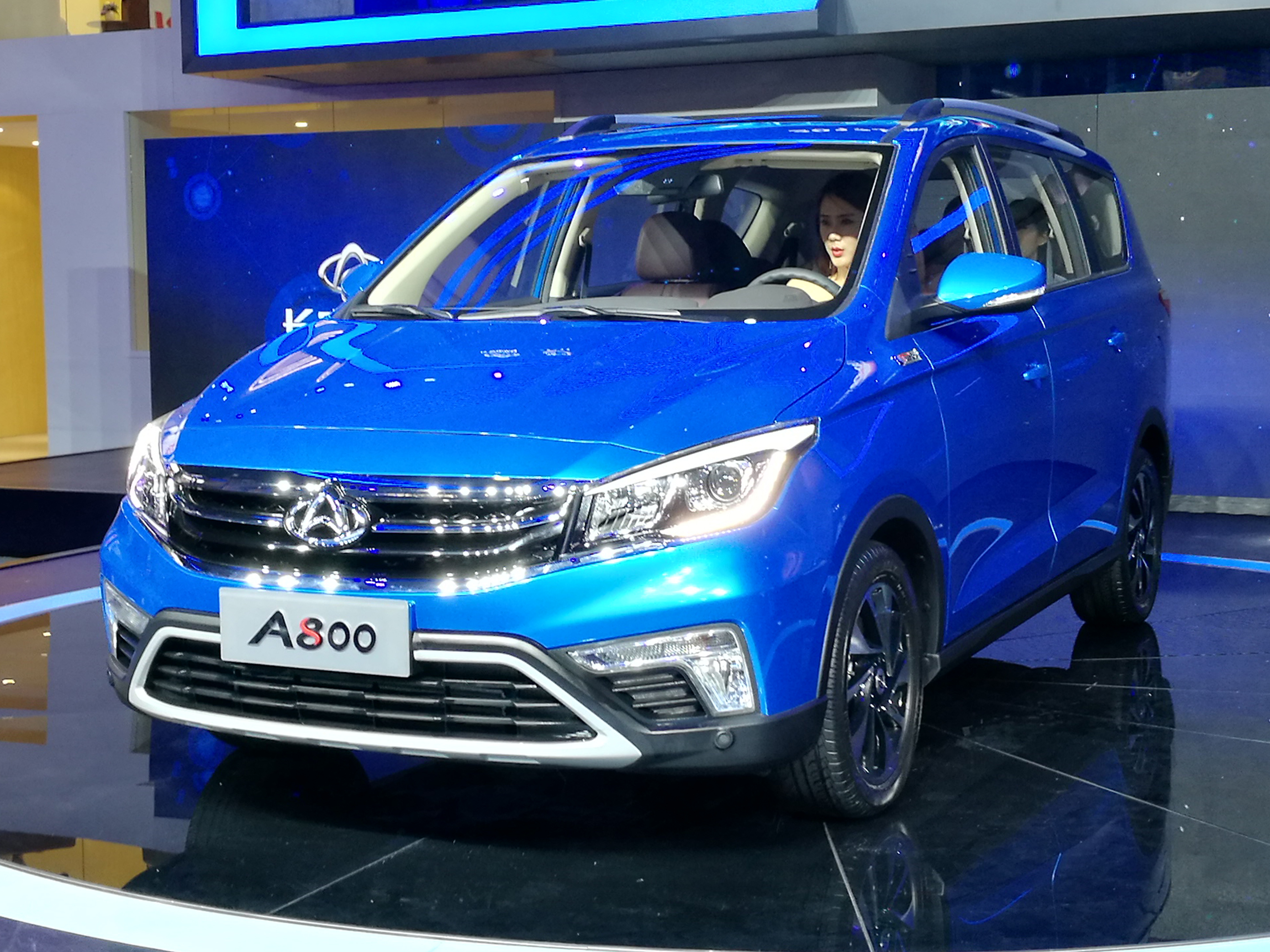
Changan Oushang A800 front

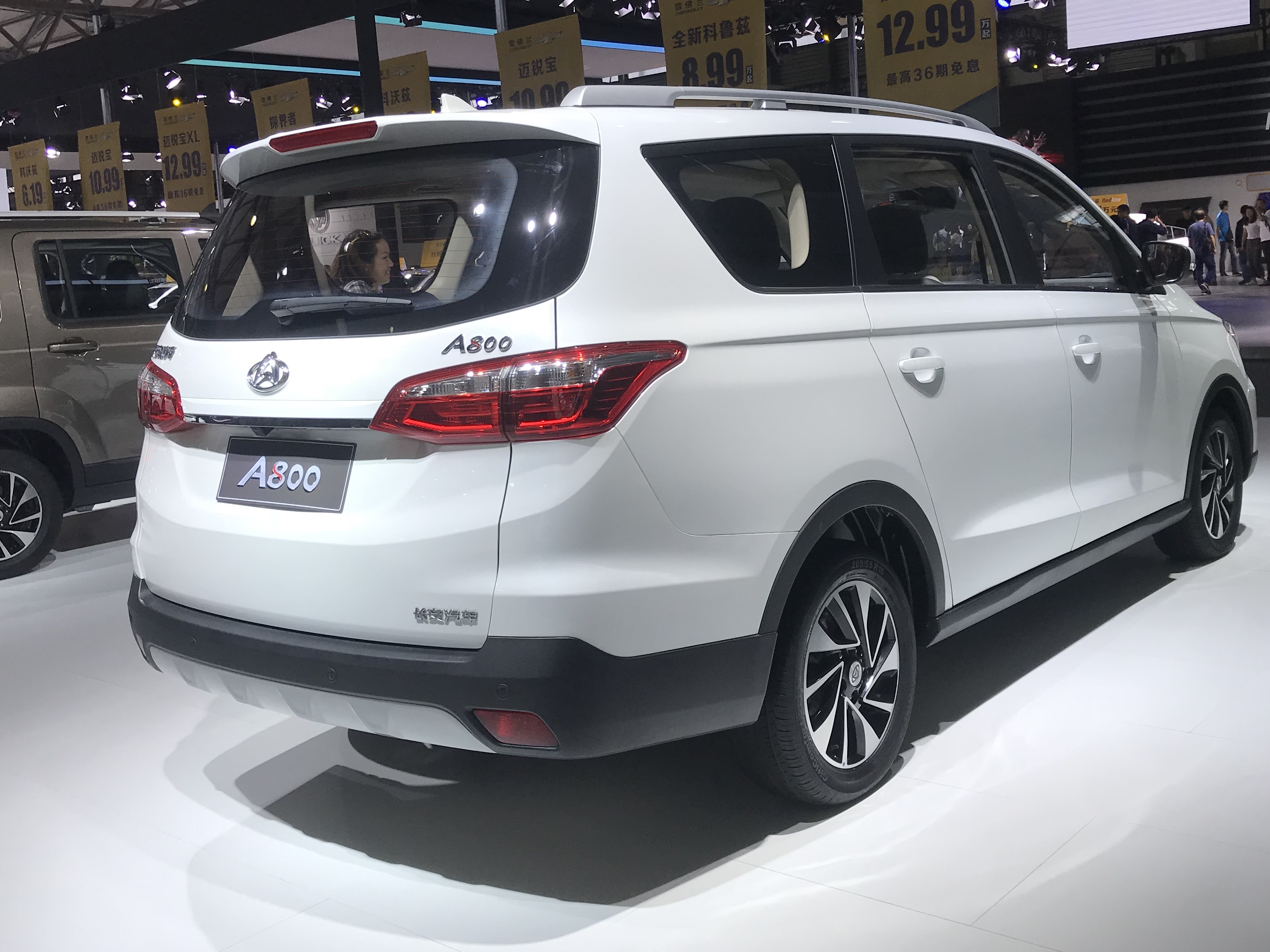
Changan Oushang A800 rear
