= Kaicene Raesor S50T =

Chinese automobile

Raesor S50T
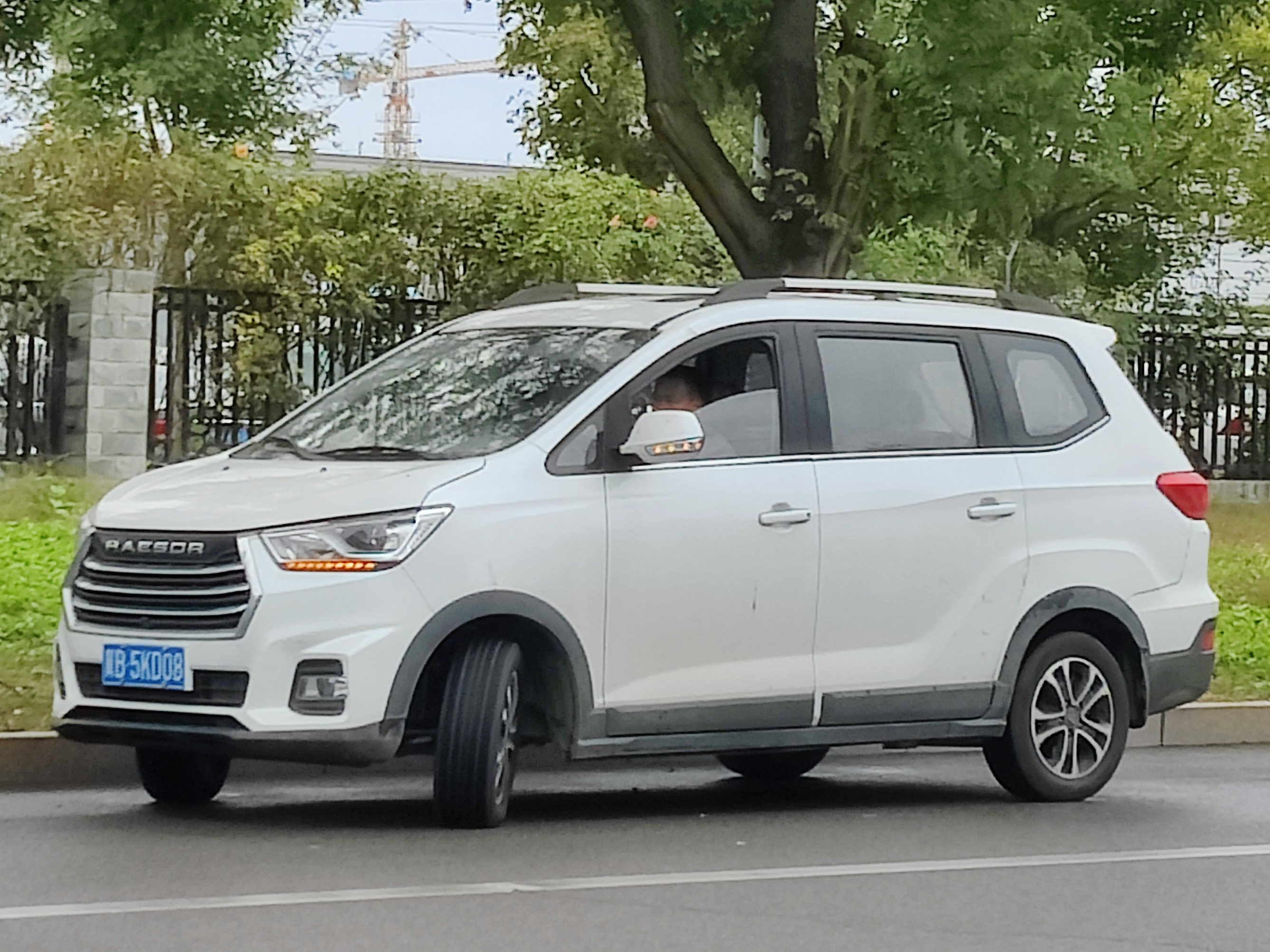
- Kaicene Raesor S50T

Overview
- Manufacturer: Changan Automobile
- Production: 2018–2019
- Model years: 2018–2019

Body and chassis
- Class: Compact MPV
- Body style: 5-door minivan
- Layout: Front-engine, front-wheel-drive

Powertrain
- Engine: 1.5 L I4 (turbo petrol); 1.5 L I4 (petrol)
- Transmission: 5-speed manual 6-speed manual

Dimensions
- Wheelbase: 2,850 mm (112.2 in)
- Length: 4,720 mm (185.8 in)
- Width: 1,770 mm (69.7 in)
- Height: 1,885 mm (74.2 in)

The Raesor S50T is a minivan produced by Changan Automobile under the Raesor (Ruixing) series of the Kaicene sub-brand.

== Overview ==
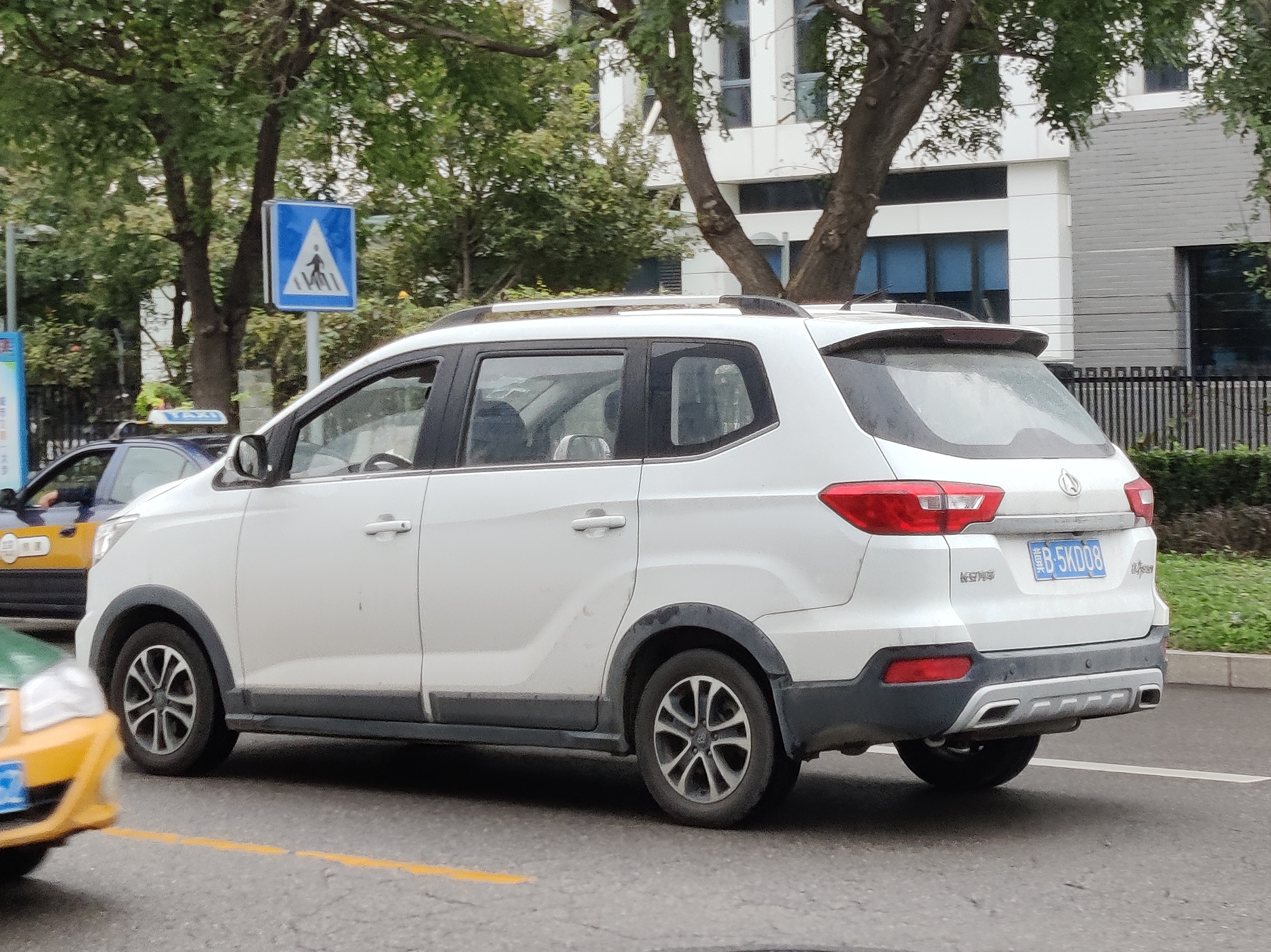
Raesor S50T rear

The Raesor S50T debuted in the 2017 and was launched on the Chinese auto market with prices ranging from 61,900 yuan to 71,900 yuan at launch.

The Raesor S50T seats seven. The power of the Raesor S50T comes from a 1.6 liter inline-four engine producing 116hp and 150nm of torque and a 1.6 liter inline-four turbo engine producing 150hp and 110nm of torque. The front suspension is McPherson and rear suspension is multi-link dependent design. The S50T also features alloys and disc brakes for all four wheels on all trim levels.

The Raesor S50T is manufactured by Changan's commercial division, Chana, later known as Kaicene.
