= Changan Ruixing M90 =

Chinese automobile

Ruixing M90
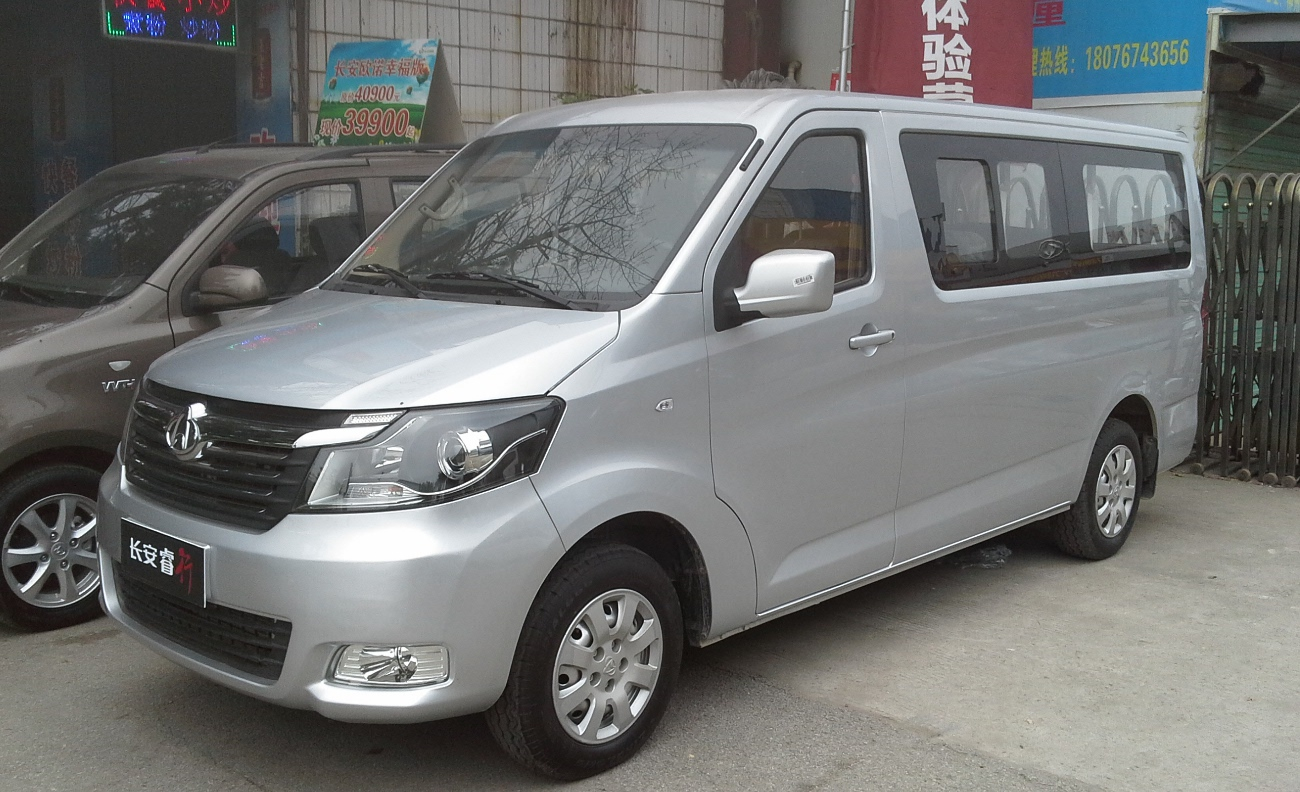
- Ruixing M90

Overview
- Manufacturer: Changan Automobile
- Also called: Ruixing M70
- Production: 2016–present
- Model years: 2016–present

Body and chassis
- Class: MPV
- Body style: 5-door wagon
- Layout: Front-engine, front-wheel-drive

Powertrain
- Engine: 2.0 L I4 (turbo petrol)
- Transmission: 5-speed manual

Dimensions
- Wheelbase: 2,850 mm (112.2 in)
- Length: 5,180 mm (203.9 in)
- Width: 1,744 mm (68.7 in)
- Height: 1,990 mm (78.3 in); 2,200 mm (86.6 in) (high roof)

The Ruixing M90 is a MPV produced by Changan Automobile under the Ruixing series of the Kaicene sub-brand.

== Overview ==
The Ruixing M90 debuted in the 2016 and was launched on the Chinese auto market with prices ranging from 68,500 yuan to 92,500 yuan at launch.

The Ruixing M90 is available in 4-seater, a 6-seater, a 7-seater, and a 9-seater configurations. The power of the Ruixing M90 comes from a Mitsubishi-sourced 4G94S 2.0 liter four-cylinder petrol engine producing 122hp and 166nm of torque.

The Ruixing M90 is manufactured by Chana, Changan's commercial division, also later known as Oushang. As of 2019, the Ruixing van products has been excluded from Oushang's official website and was sold separately from a different channel under the Kaicene brand.

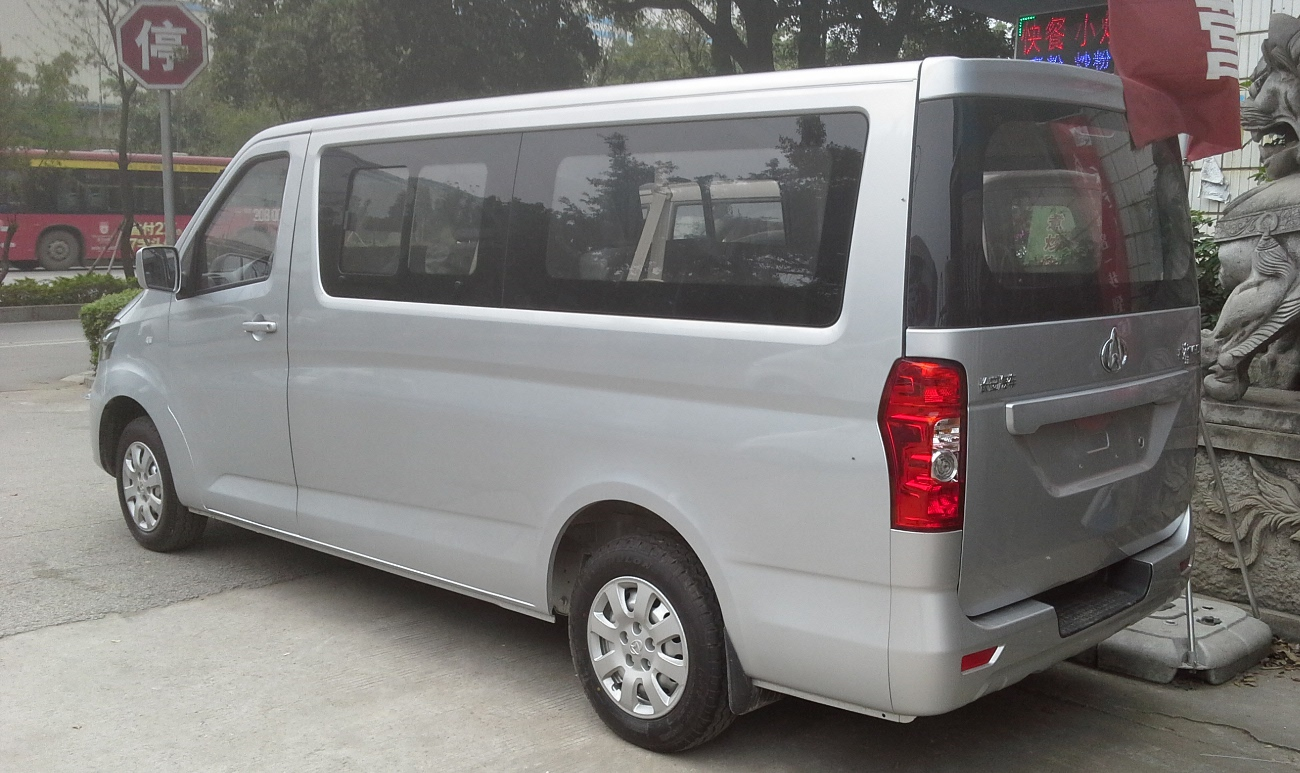
Ruixing M90 rear

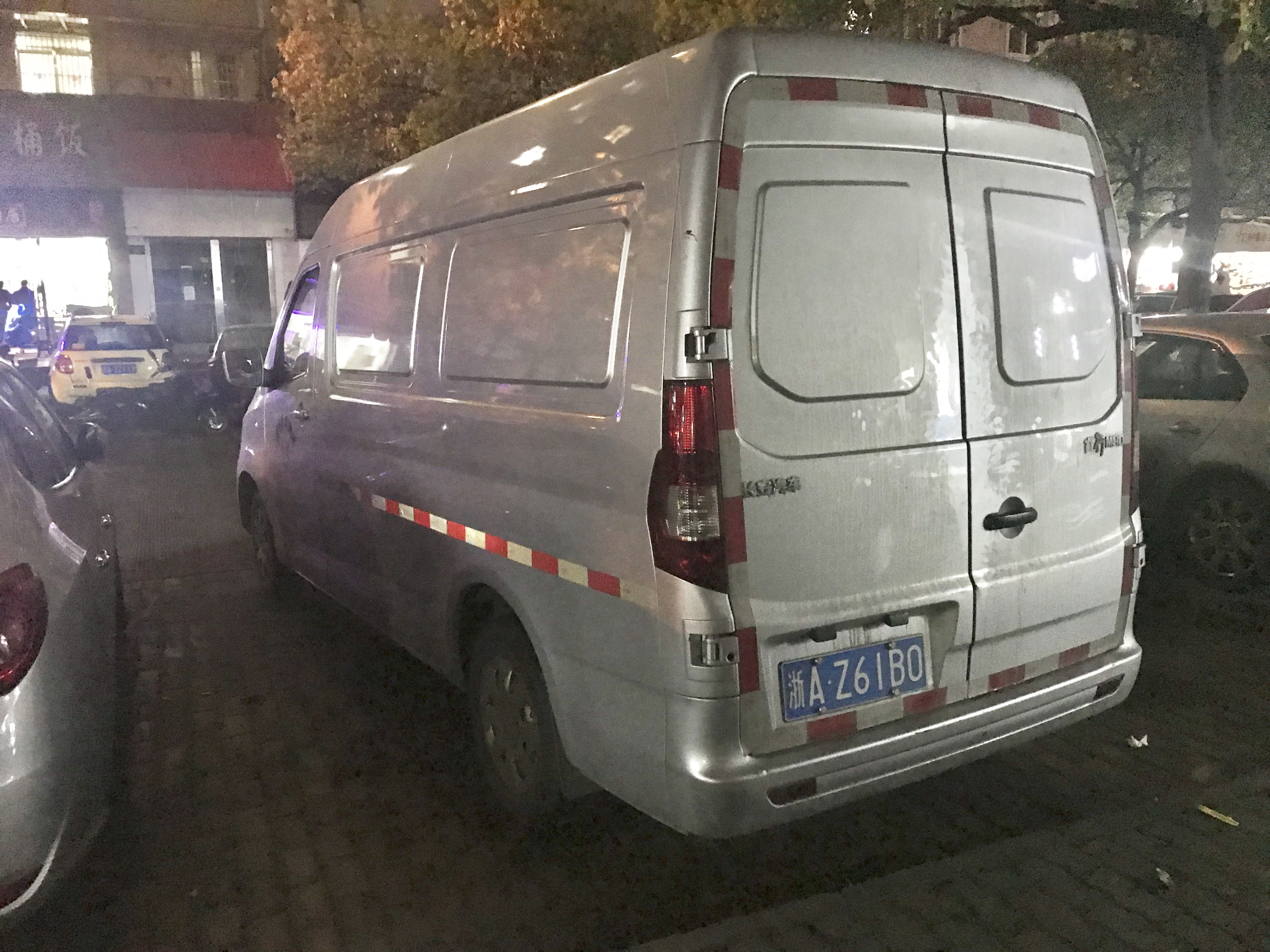
Ruixing M90 panel van rear

== Ruixing M70 ==
The Ruixing M70 is essentially the shorter version of the Ruixing M90 MPV.

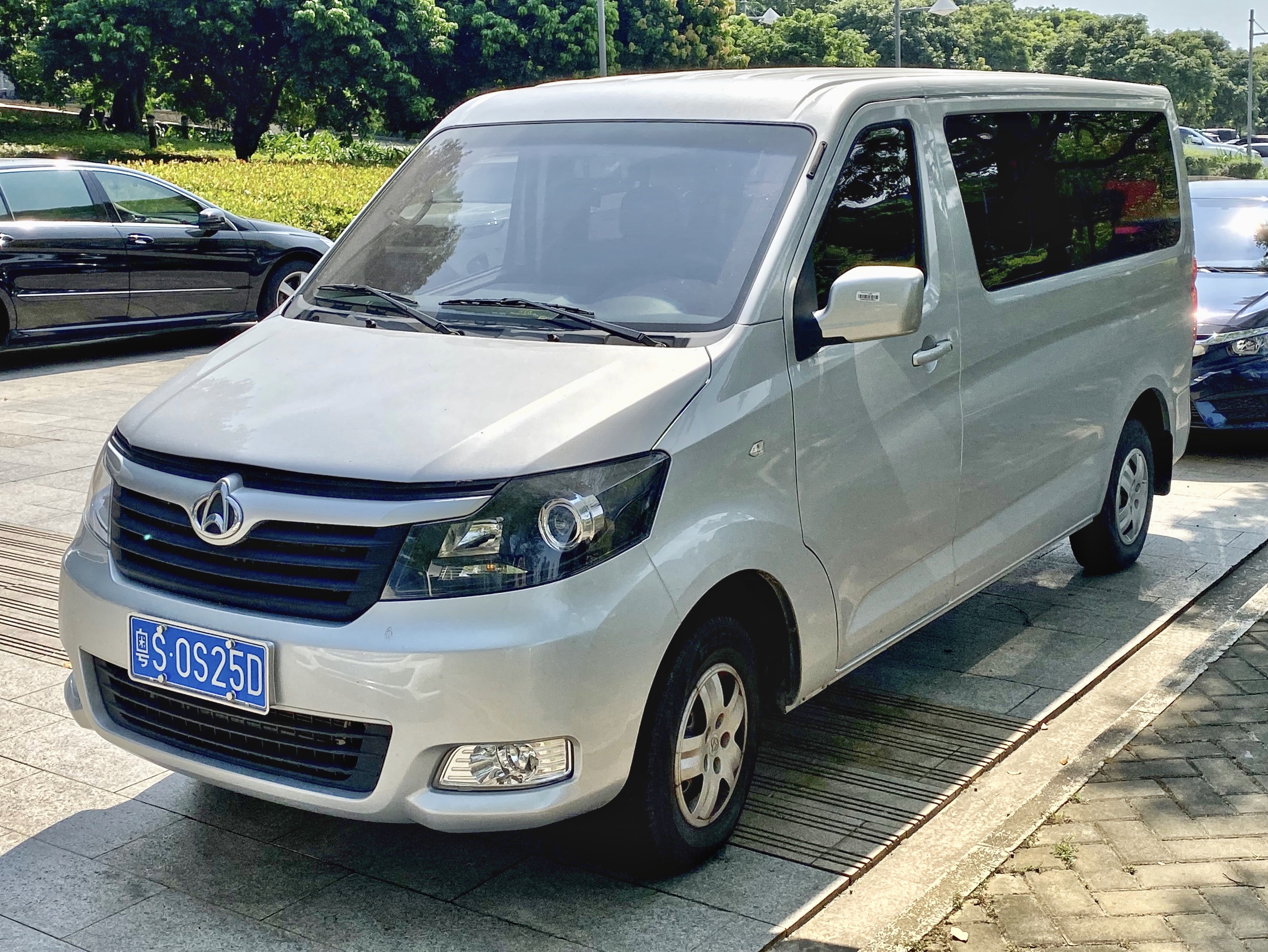
Chana Ruixing M70 front

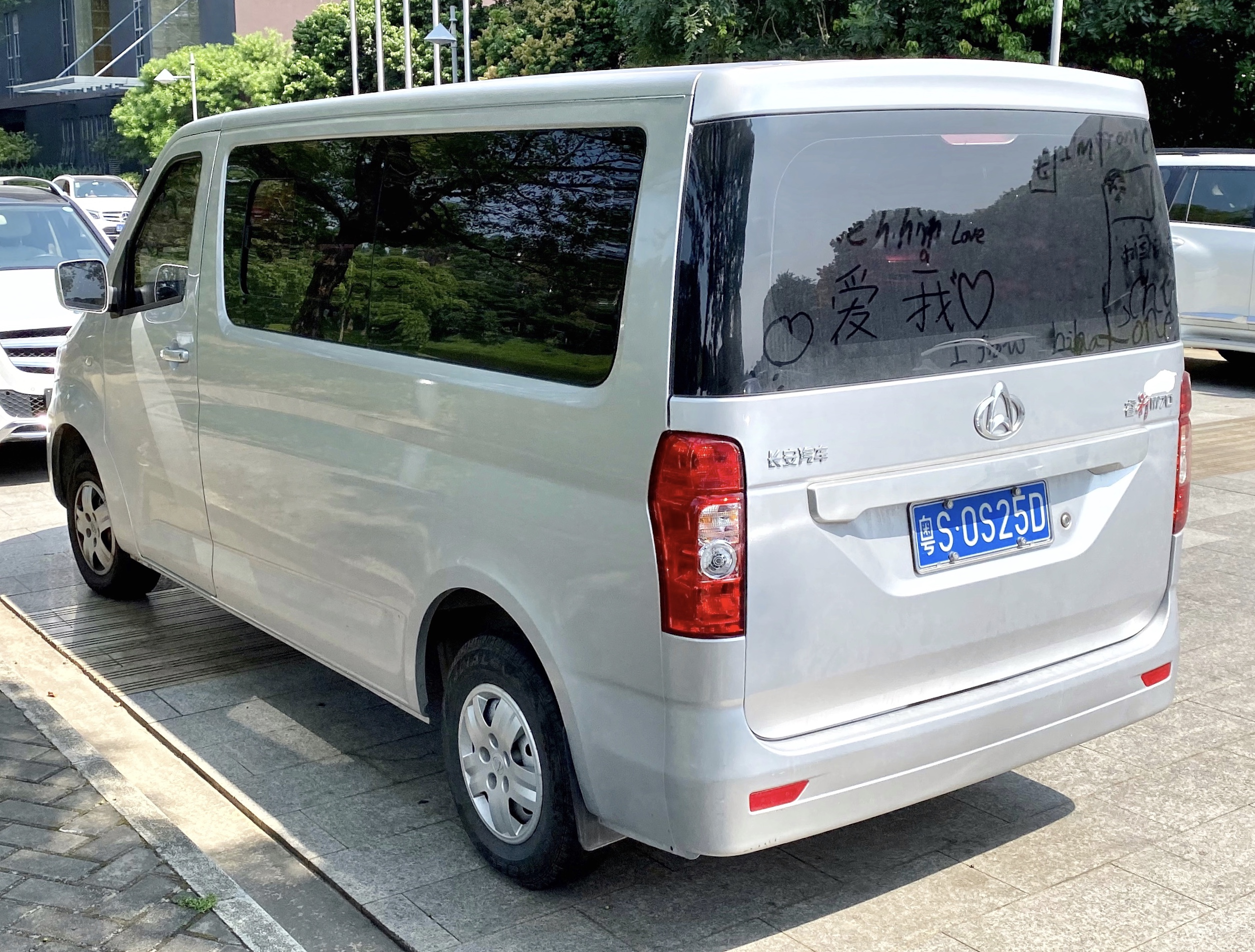
Chana Ruixing M70 rear

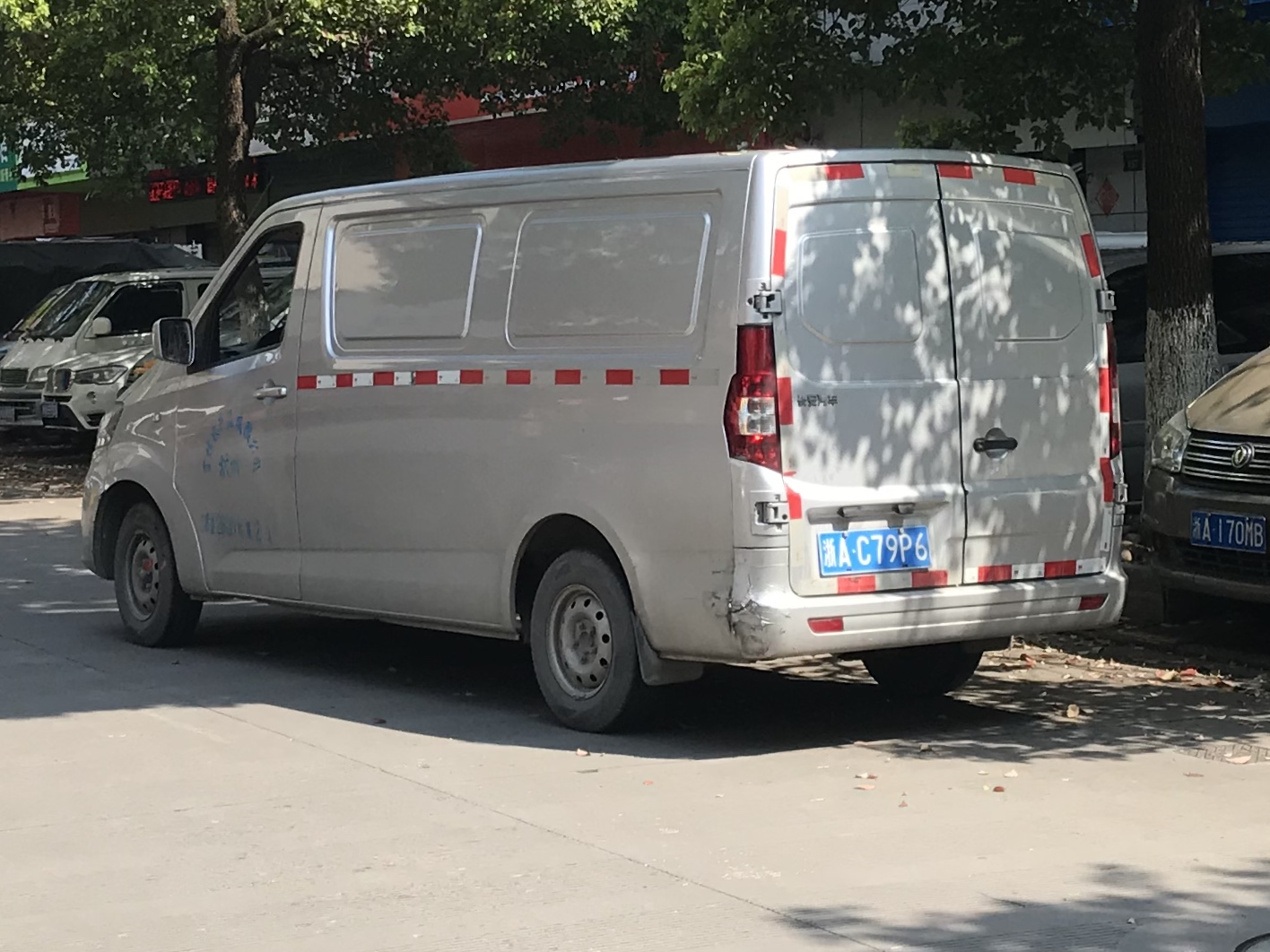
Ruixing M70 panel van rear
