= Changan Ruixing S50 =

Chinese automobile

Ruixing S50
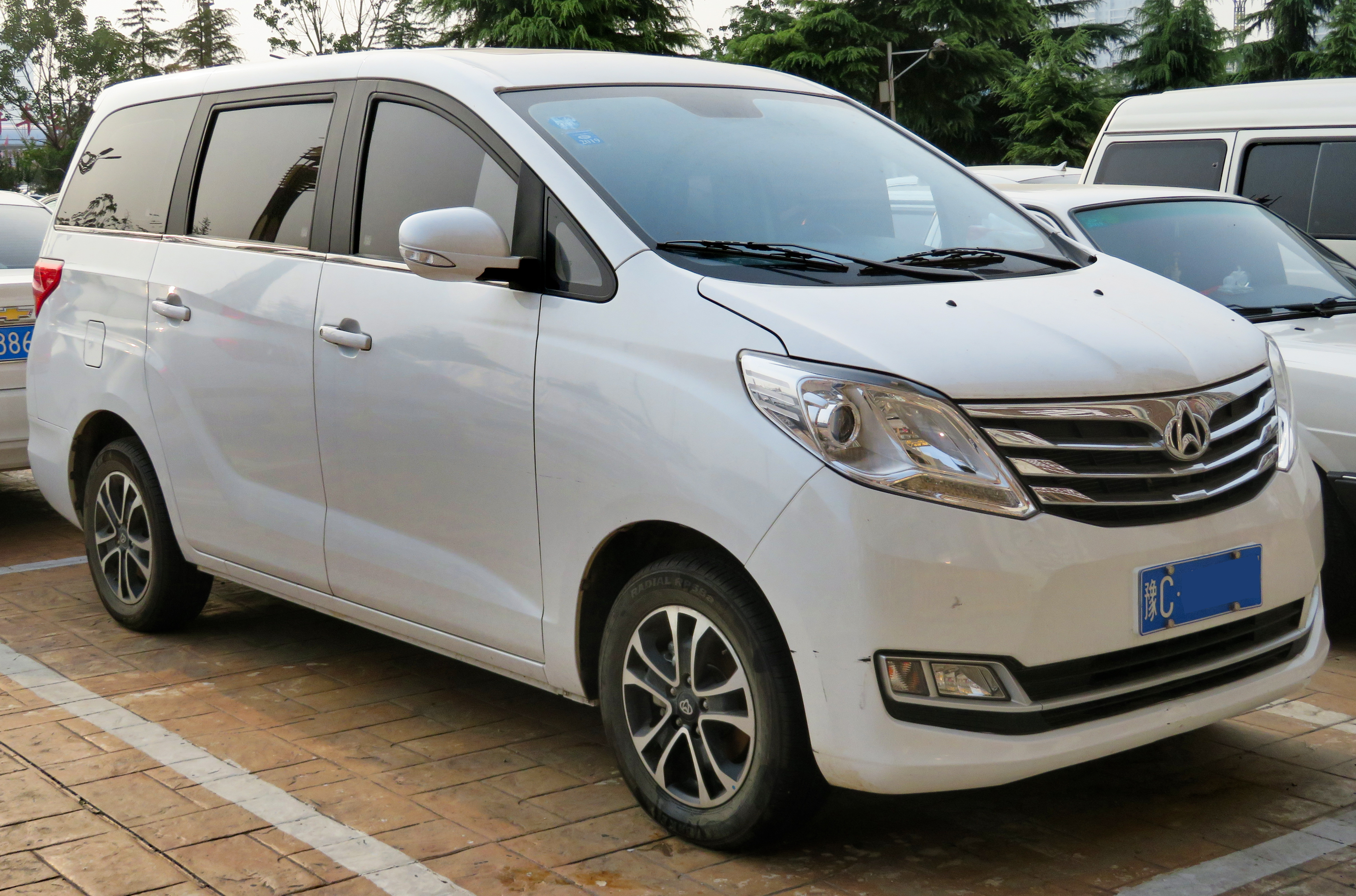
- Ruixing S50V

Overview
- Manufacturer: Changan Automobile
- Also called: Ruixing S50V; Changan S50
- Production: 2016–2019

Body and chassis
- Class: Compact MPV
- Body style: 5-door minivan
- Layout: Front-engine, front-wheel-drive

Powertrain
- Engine: 1.5 L I4 (turbo petrol); 1.5 L I4 (petrol)
- Transmission: 5-speed manual

Dimensions
- Wheelbase: 2,850 mm (112.2 in)
- Length: 4,600 mm (181.1 in)
- Width: 1,770 mm (69.7 in)
- Height: 1,855 mm (73.0 in)

The Ruixing S50 and Ruixing S50V is a minivan produced by Changan Automobile under the Ruixing sub-brand.

== Overview ==
The Ruixing S50 debuted in the 2016 and was launched on the Chinese auto market with prices ranging from 48,900 yuan to 77,900 yuan at launch.

The Ruixing S50 seats seven in a 2-2-3 configuration. The power of the Ruixing S50 comes from a 1.6-liter inline-four producing 116hp and 150nm of torque. The front and rear end design of the Ruixing S50 is controversial as the styling heavily resembles the second generation Toyota Alphard.

The Ruixing S50 is manufactured by Chana, Changan's commercial division, also later known as Oushang. As of 2019, the Ruixing van products has been excluded from Oushang's official website and was sold separately from a different channel. Internationally, the Ruixing S50 was sold simply as the Changan S50.

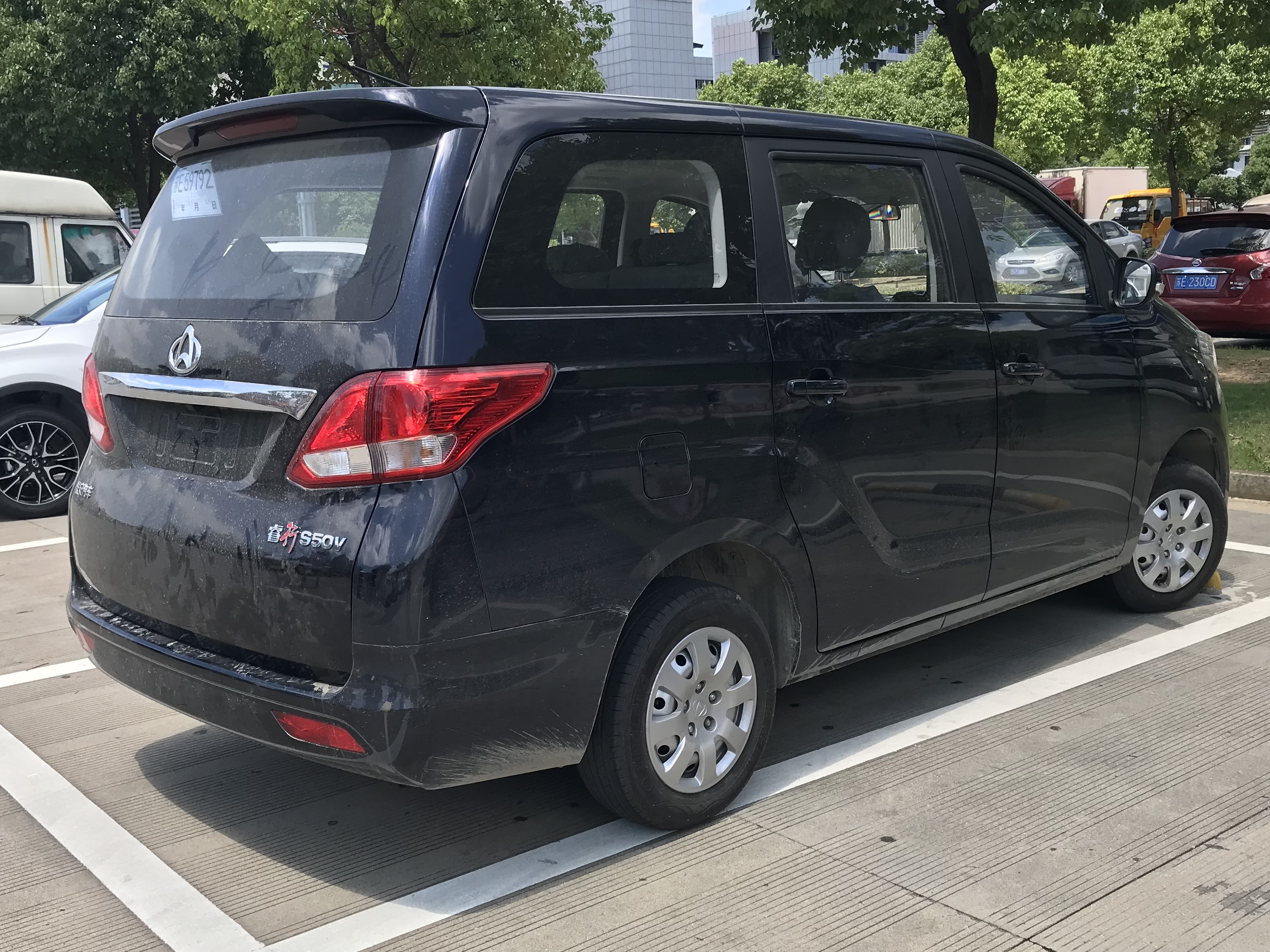
Ruixing S50V rear
