= Oshan X70A =

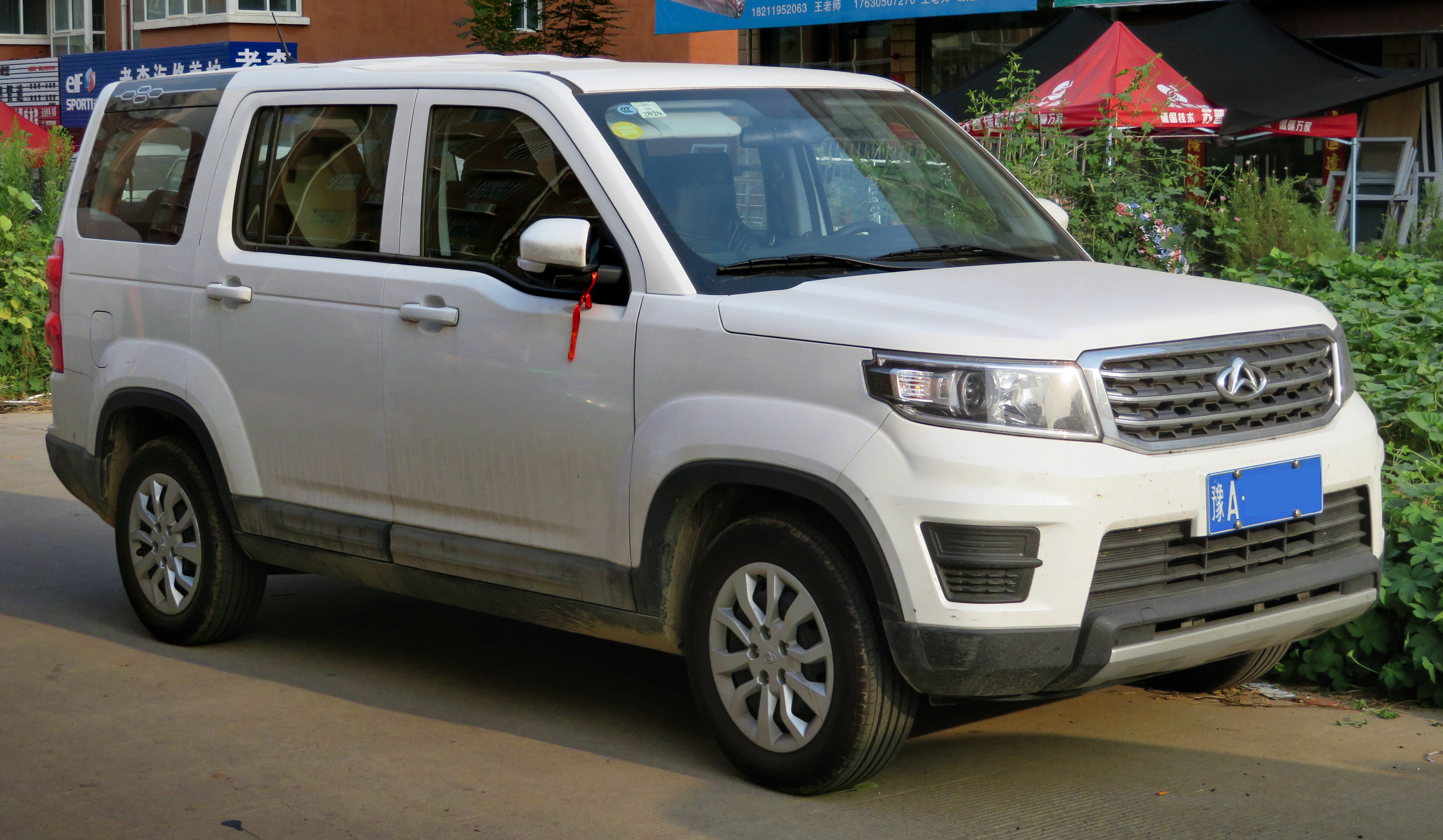
- Oshan X70A

Overview
- Manufacturer: Changan Automobile
- Also called: Changan X70A/Oushang X70A
- Production: 2017–2022
- Model years: 2018–2022

Body and chassis
- Class: Compact CUV
- Body style: 5-door wagon
- Layout: Front-engine, rear-wheel-drive

Powertrain
- Engine: 1.5 L I4 (petrol)
- Transmission: 5-speed manual

Dimensions
- Wheelbase: 2,750 mm (108.3 in)
- Length: 4,620 mm (181.9 in)
- Width: 1,770 mm (69.7 in)
- Height: 1,840 mm (72.4 in)

The Oshan X70A (长安欧尚X70A), sometimes known as Changan X70A and the Oushang X70A, is a compact CUV produced by Changan Automobile under the Oshan or originally the Chana sub-brand.

== History ==
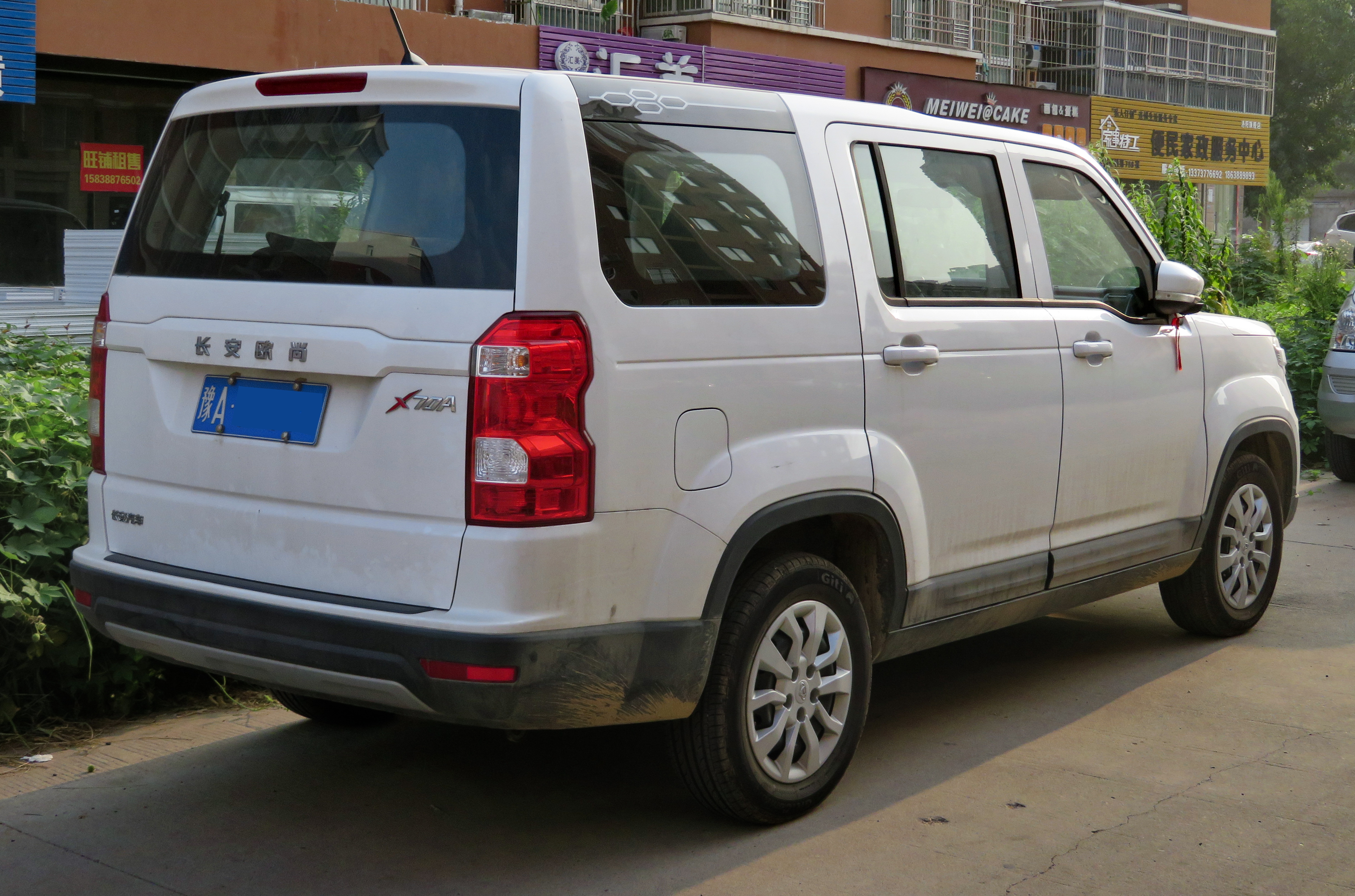
Rearview

The X70A debuted on the 2017 Guangzhou Auto Show, and was launched on the Chinese auto market on January 27, 2018. Pricing for the X70A ranges from 59,900 yuan to 76,900 yuan slotting above the compact CX70 and CX70T.

== Design ==
Seating setup of the X70A is available as 2+2+3 or 2+3 setup.

=== Powertrain ===
The X70A is a front-engine rear-wheel-drive layout vehicle with power coming from a 1.5 liter engine with max power of 107hp and peak torque of 145Nm mated to a 5-speed manual transmission.

=== Design controversies ===
The exterior design of the X70A was controversial as the styling heavily resembles the Land Rover Discovery Series IV. It's reported that the X70A is more compact than the Discovery.
