= Oshan (marque) =

Chinese manufacturer owned by Changan Automobile

Changan Oshan
- Formerly: Changan Commercial Vehicles (2010-2017)
- Type: State-owned
- Industry: Automotive
- Founded: 2010
- Defunct: 2024
- Fate: Merged into Changan brand
- Headquarters: Chongqing, China
- Area served: Worldwide
- Products: Motor vehicles
- Website: https://www.oshanauto.com/

Oshan (Chinese: 欧尚; pinyin: Ōushàng) was a passenger car brand under Changan Automobile. It was originally known as the Changan Commercial Vehicles, the division which focuses producing on micro vans and light trucks. The brand was renamed to Changan Oshan in April 2017 which marks it involvement in producing passenger vehicles.

The brand name "Oshan" was inspired by one of the Changan Commercial Vehicles' MPV model Oushang.

In 2024, after Changan Automobile recently announced a brand restructuring plan, Changan ended sales of the Oshan brand and merge the product line and sales channel into Changan brand.

== History ==
For the first time, the name "Oshan" was used for the minivan model presented in September 2015, which was the original portfolio brand Chana. The inauguration of the new brand was accompanied by the presentation of the minivan Cosmos, in turn Chana Oshan was henceforth named Oshan A600.

In addition to the existing designs, the range was gradually expanded by newer, ground-up models as well as twin designs of more expensive models of the parent Changan within the COS line. In 2019, the first of two SUVs debuted within the "X" model line, Oshan X7, in turn, in 2021 the company presented the avant-garde stylized model Z6 while moving away from cheaper, simpler designs. In the meantime, an electric microcar Neo II was produced for a year, which did not gain popularity.

In 2022, after the bankruptcy of joint-venture Changan Suzuki, it was decided to continue production of the sedan Suzuki Alivio with Oshan logos as Oshan Qiyue for another year.

=== Discontinuation ===
At the end of 2023, the Changan Group decided to start phasing out the brand, including the remaining 3 models in the range into the parent Changan brand. Ultimately, the Oshan brand was discontinued in early 2024 with the rebranding of their last vehicle to the Changan UNI-Z.

Despite the discontinuation of the brand, a battery-electric version of the Eado/Lamore capable of battery swapping was launched under the Oshan marque in November 2024 called the Oshan 520. The 520 is currently the only product under the Oshan brand.

== Products ==
=== Current vehicles ===
==== Sedan ====
- Oshan 520 (2024–present) compact sedan
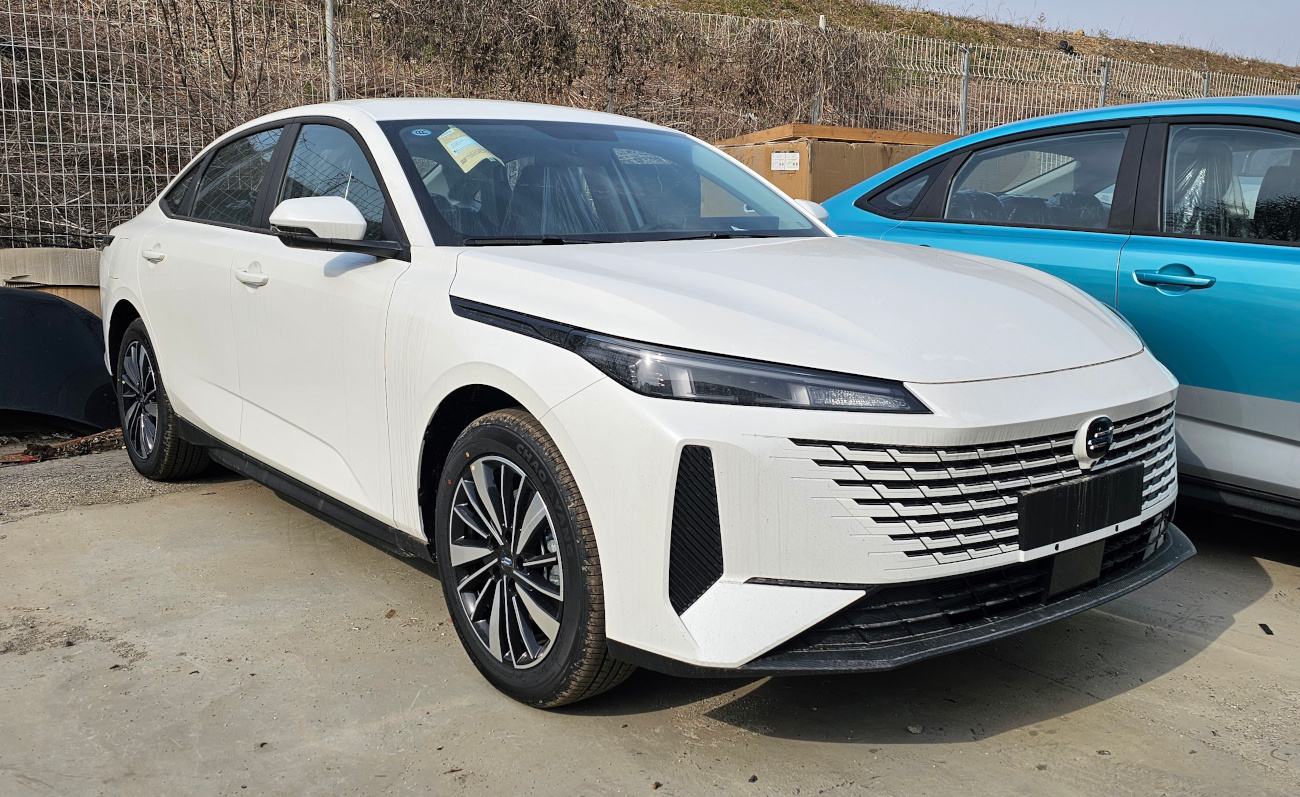
Oshan 520

=== Discontinued models ===
==== Sedan ====
- Oshan Qiyue (2022–2023), subcompact car
- Oshan Niou II (2019–2020), city car

==== SUV ====
- Oshan COS1°/COS1°GT (2018–2021), midsize SUV
- Oshan COS3° (2019–2021), subcompact SUV
- Oshan COS5° (2019–2022), subcompact SUV
- Oshan CX70/CX70T (2016–2019), midsize SUV
- Oshan X70A (2017–2022), compact SUV
- Oshan X5/ X5 Plus (2020–2024), compact SUV
- Oshan X7/ X7 Plus (2019–2024), mid-size SUV
- Oshan Z6 (2021–2024), mid-size SUV

==== MPV ====
- Oshan Changxing/A600 (2015–2022), compact MPV
- Oshan Cosmos (2018–2022), compact MPV
- Oshan A800 (2017–2020), compact MPV
- Oshan Oliwei/ Chana Eulove (2013–2018), compact MPV
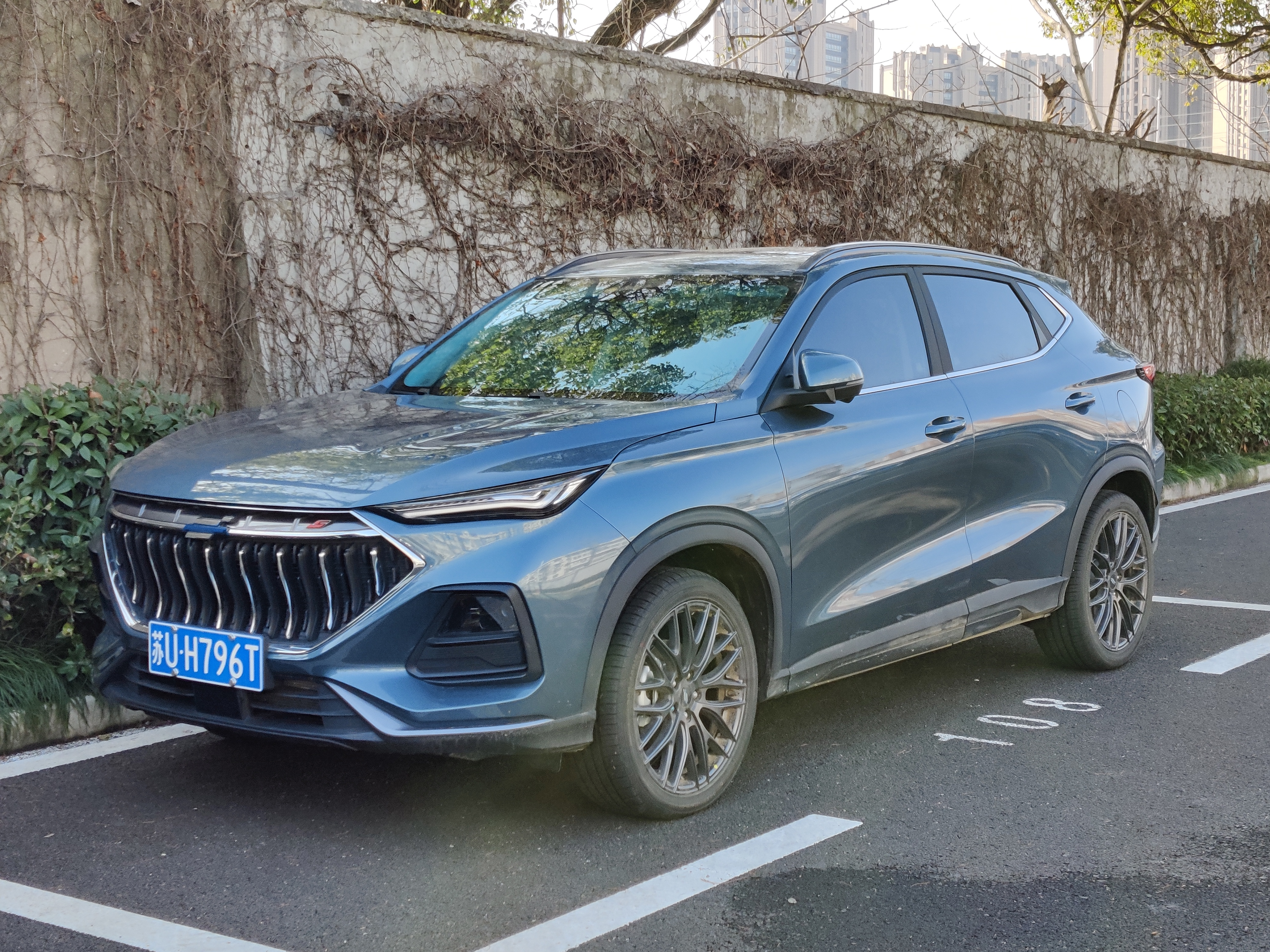
Oshan X5

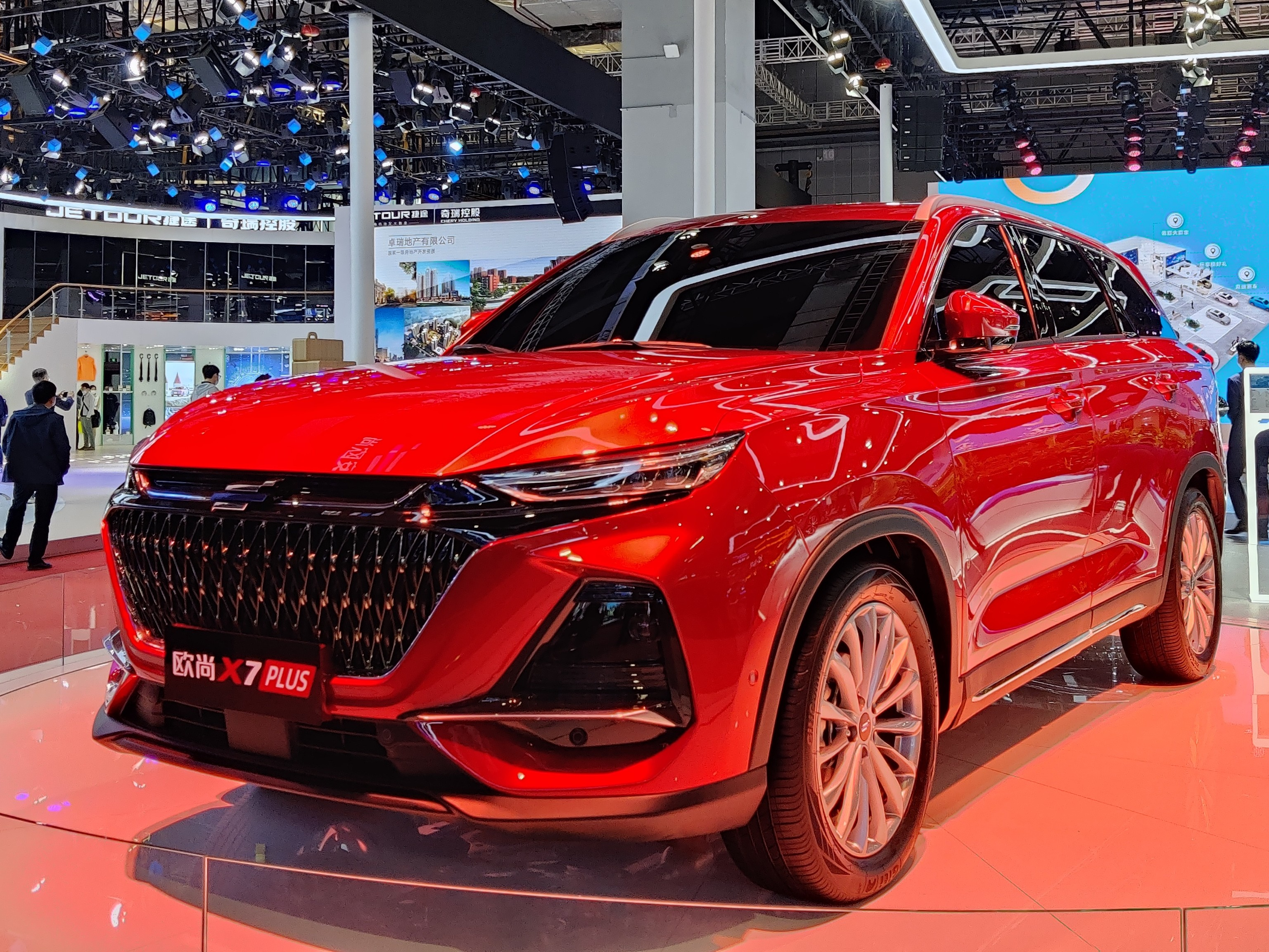
Oshan X7 Plus

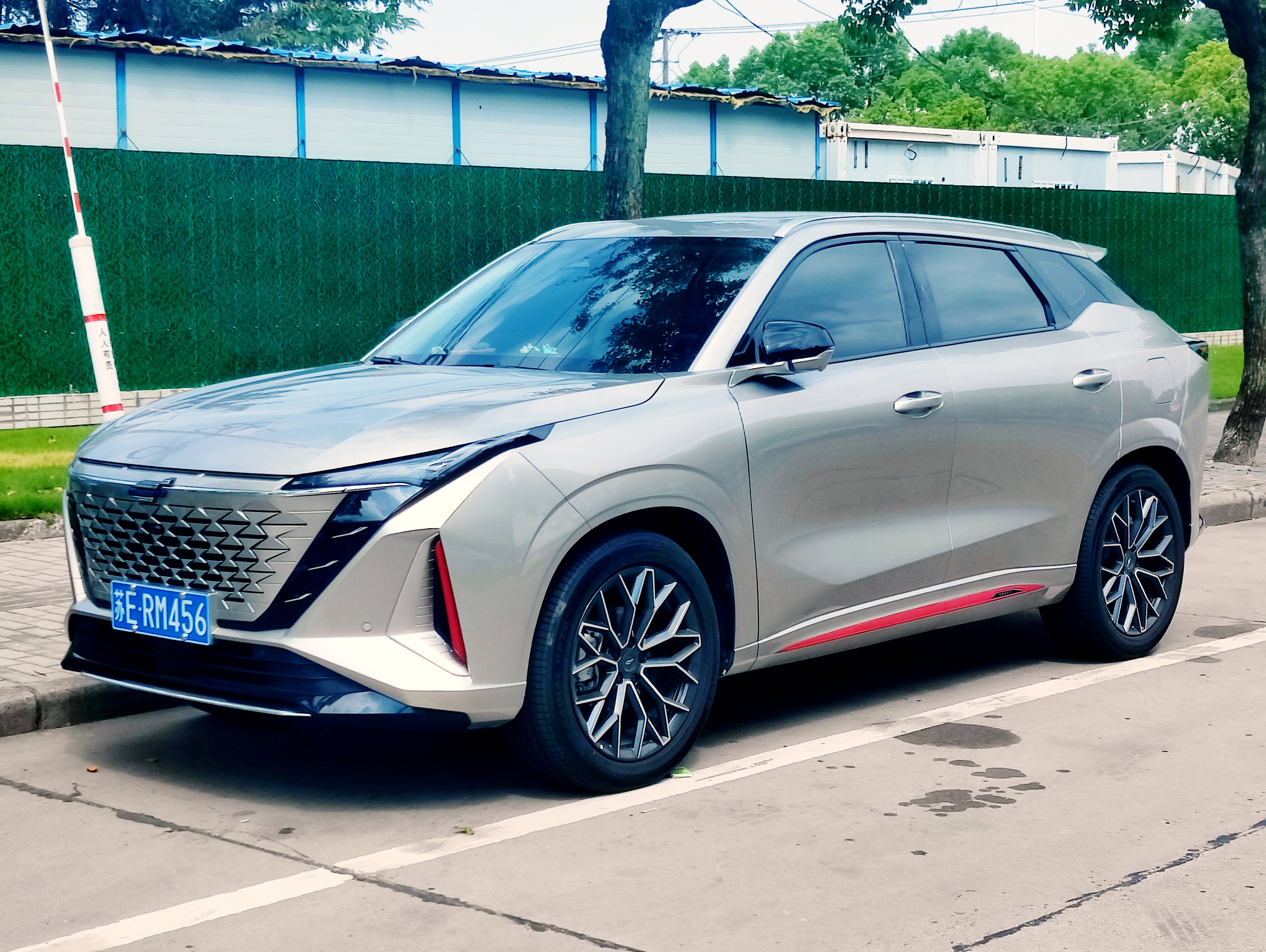
Oshan Z6

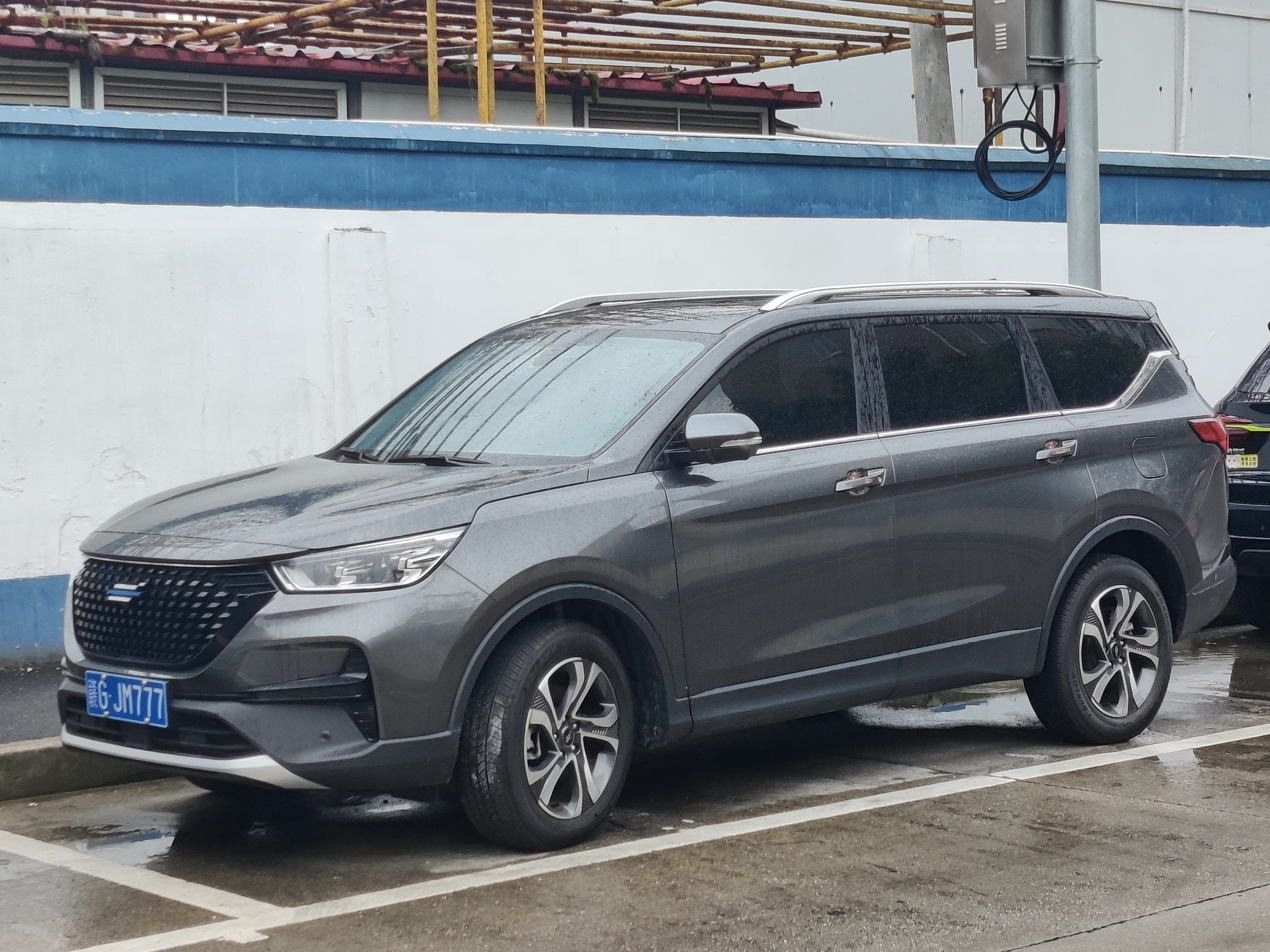
Oshan COS1°GT

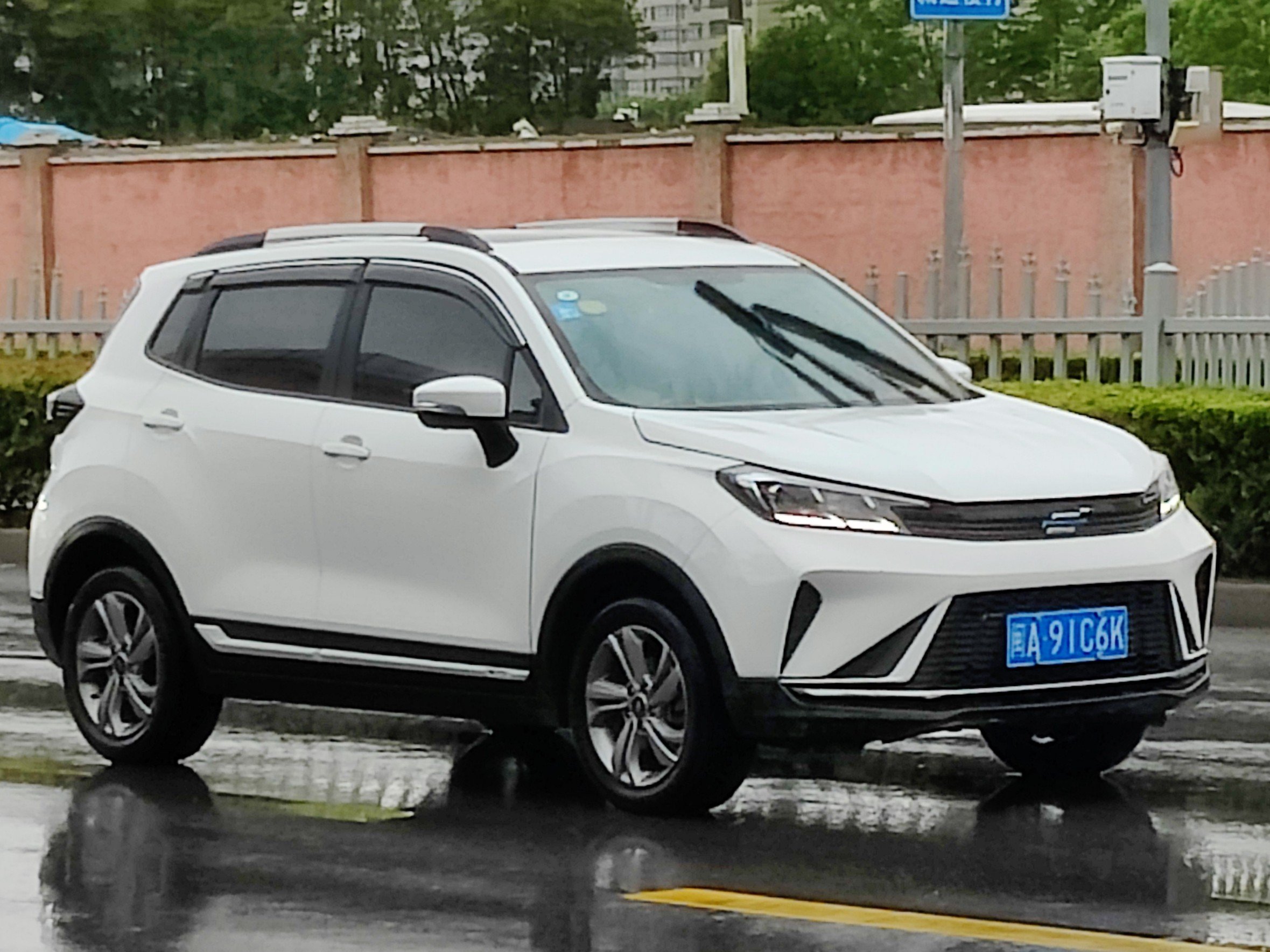
Oshan COS3°

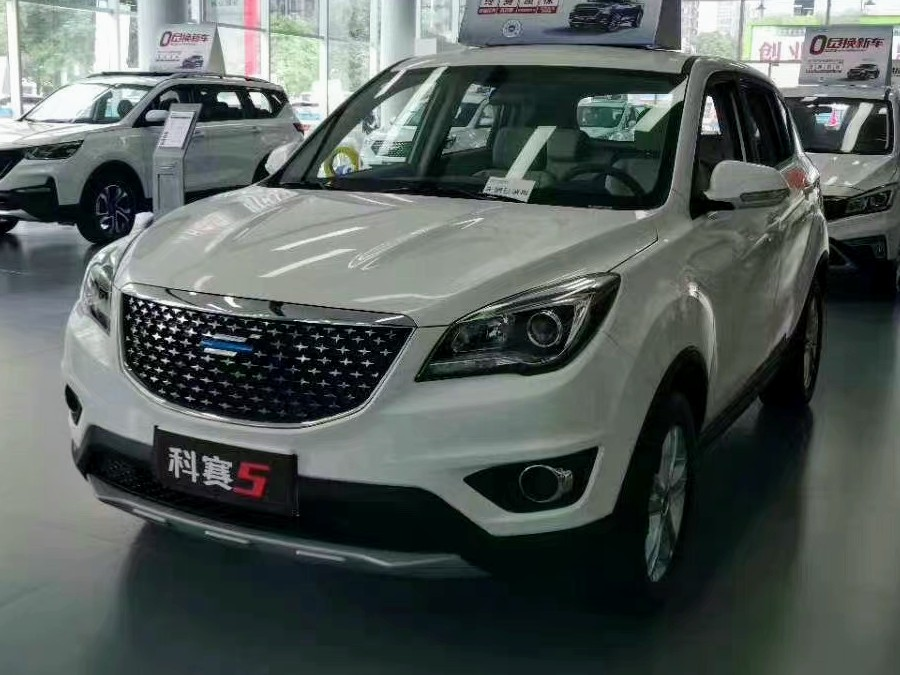
Oshan COS5°

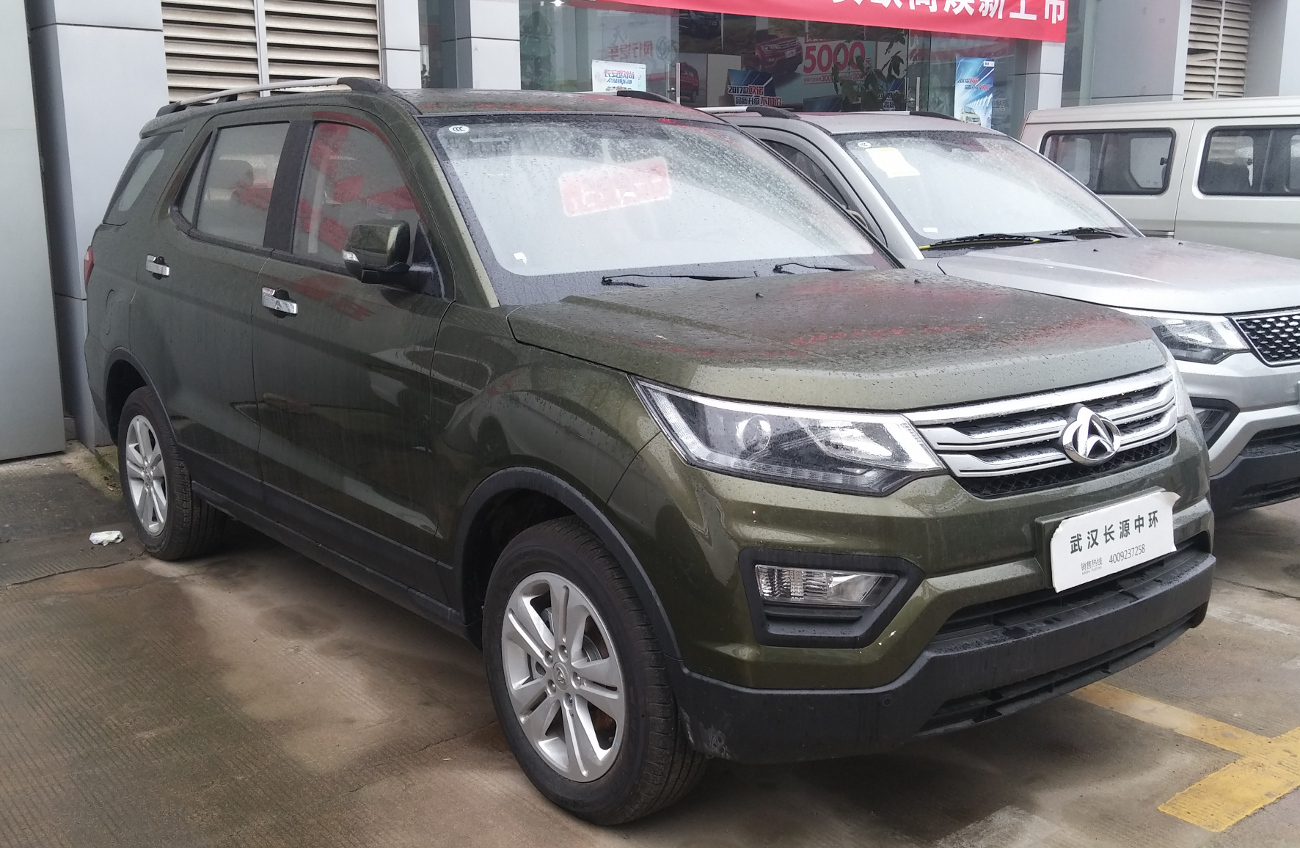
Oshan CX70

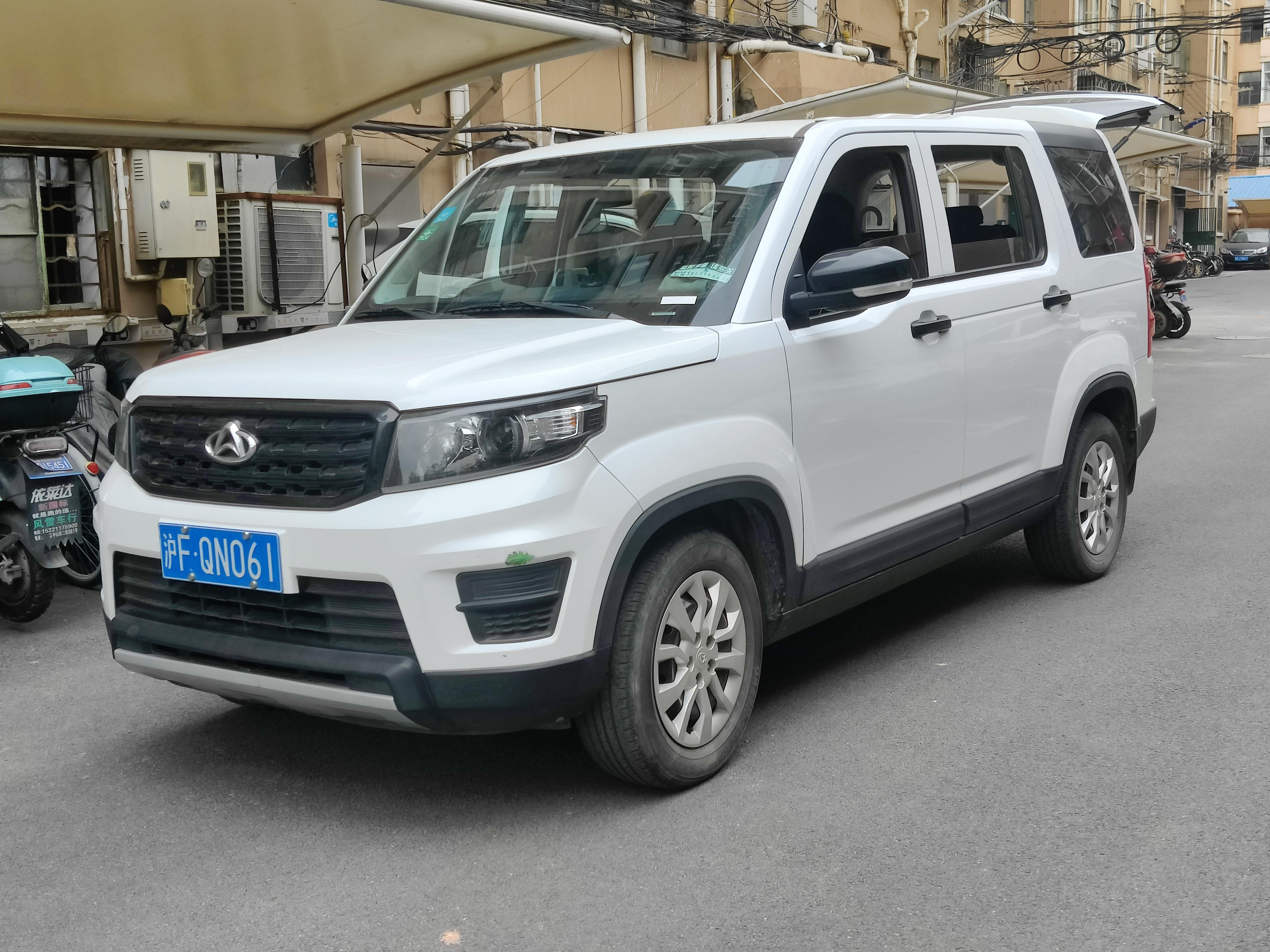
Oshan X70A

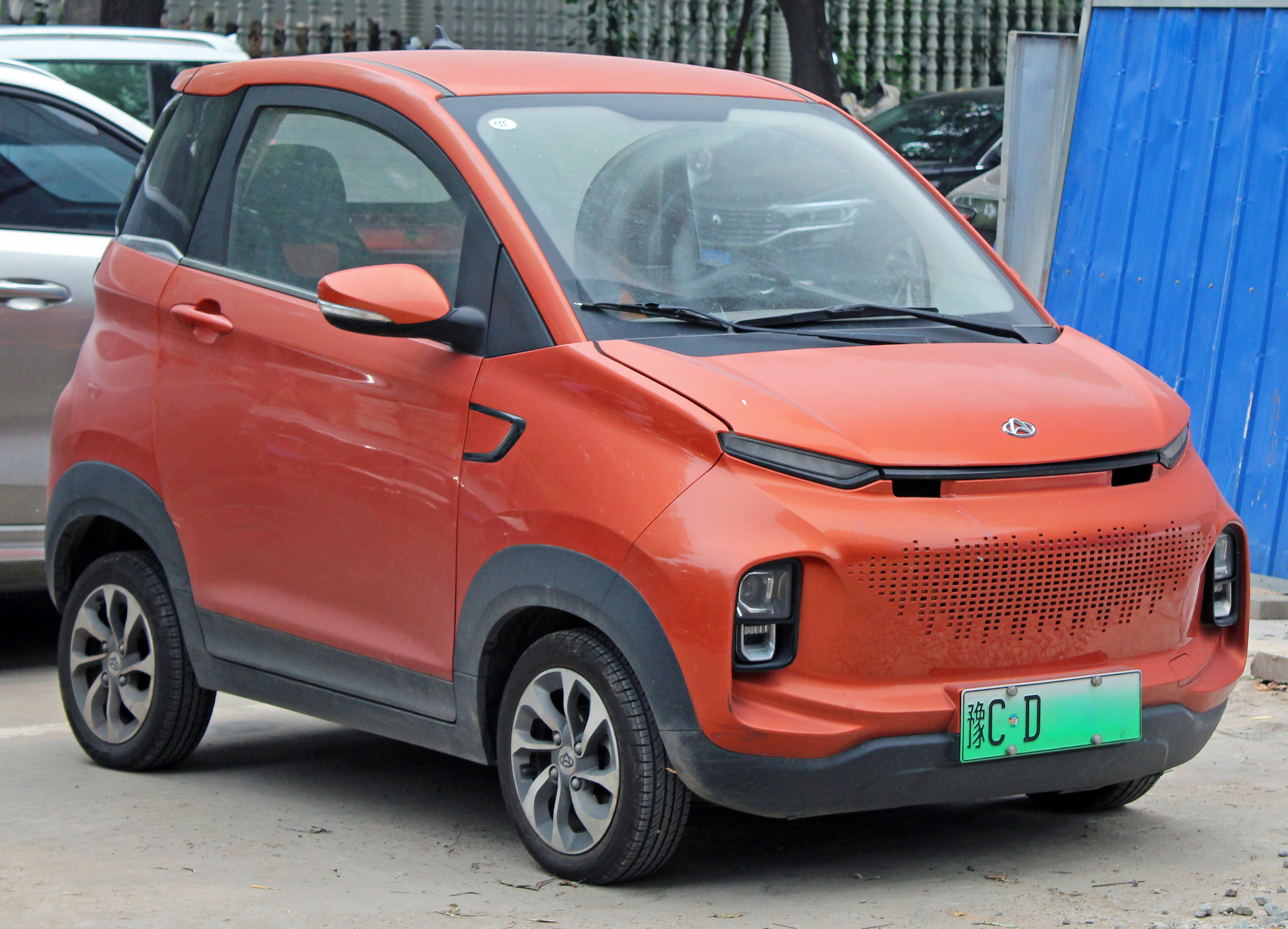
Oshan Niou II

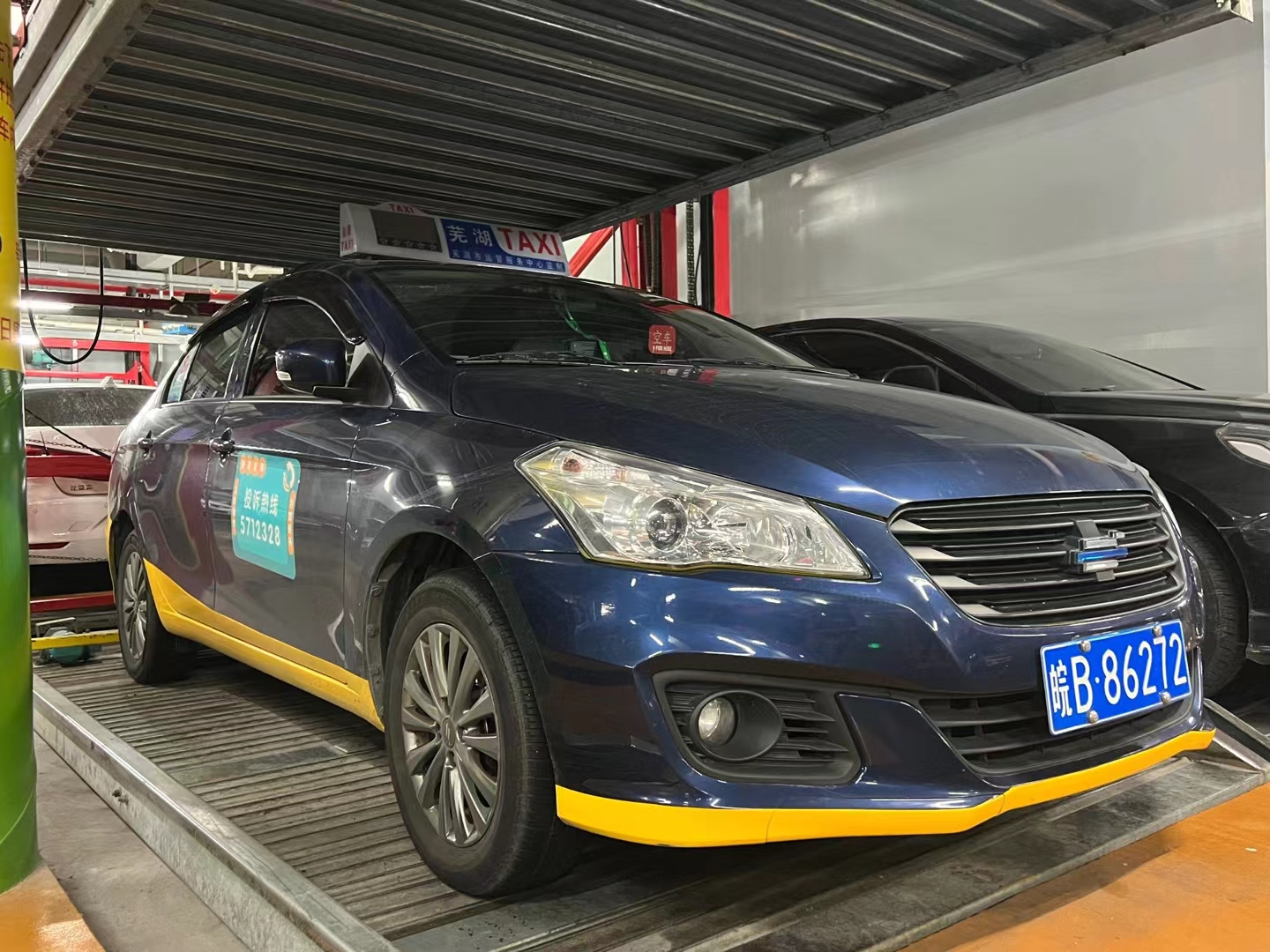
Oshan Qiyue

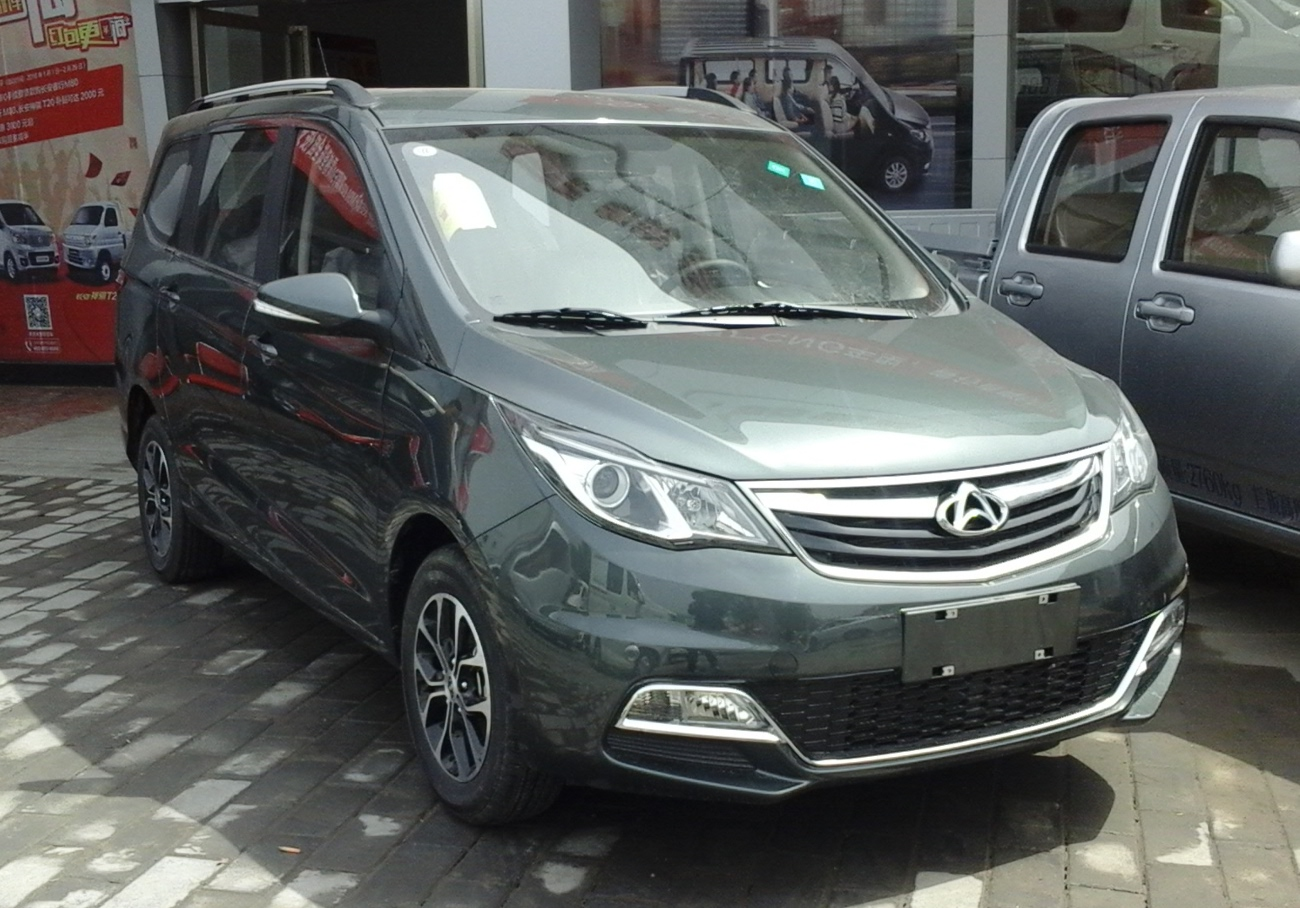
Oshan A600

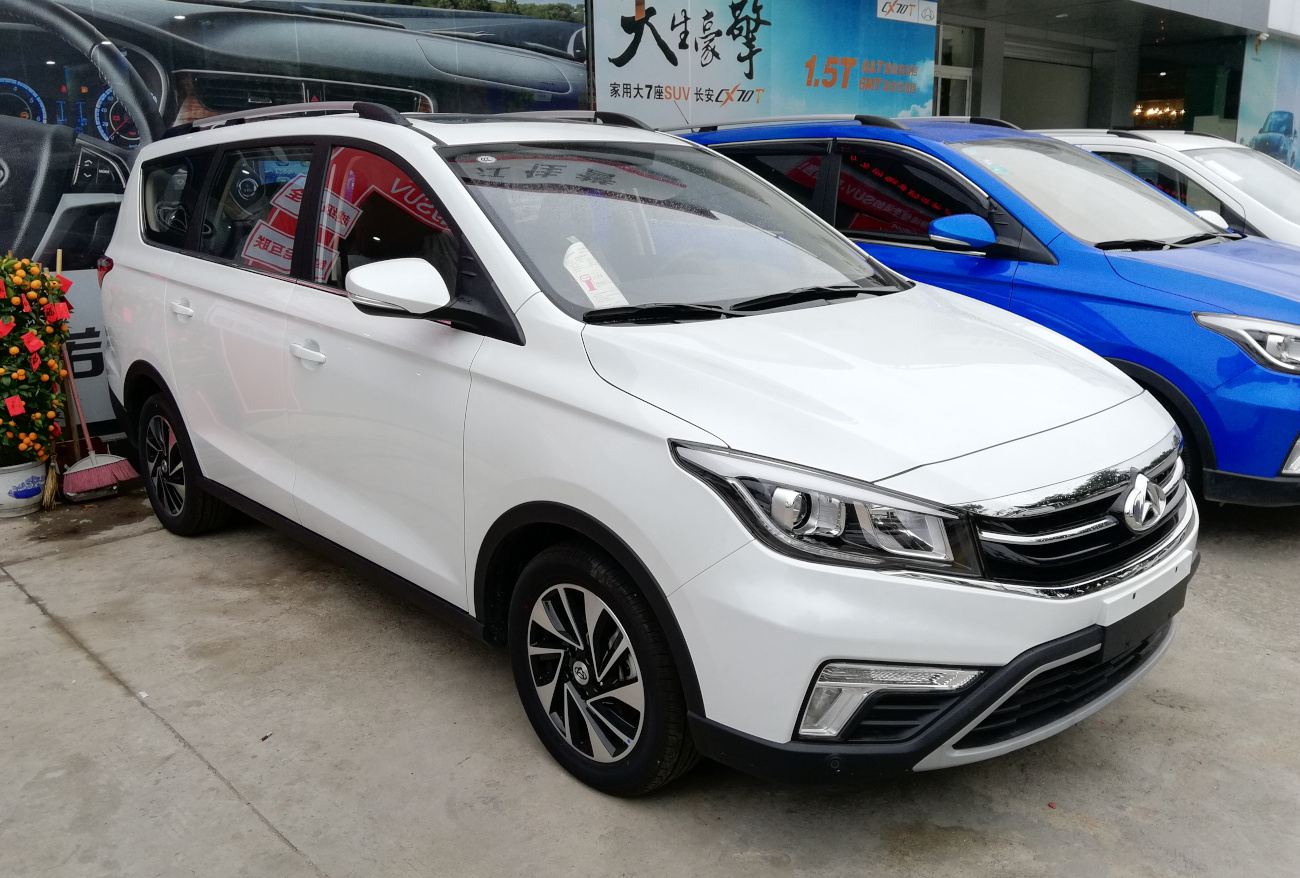
Oshan A800

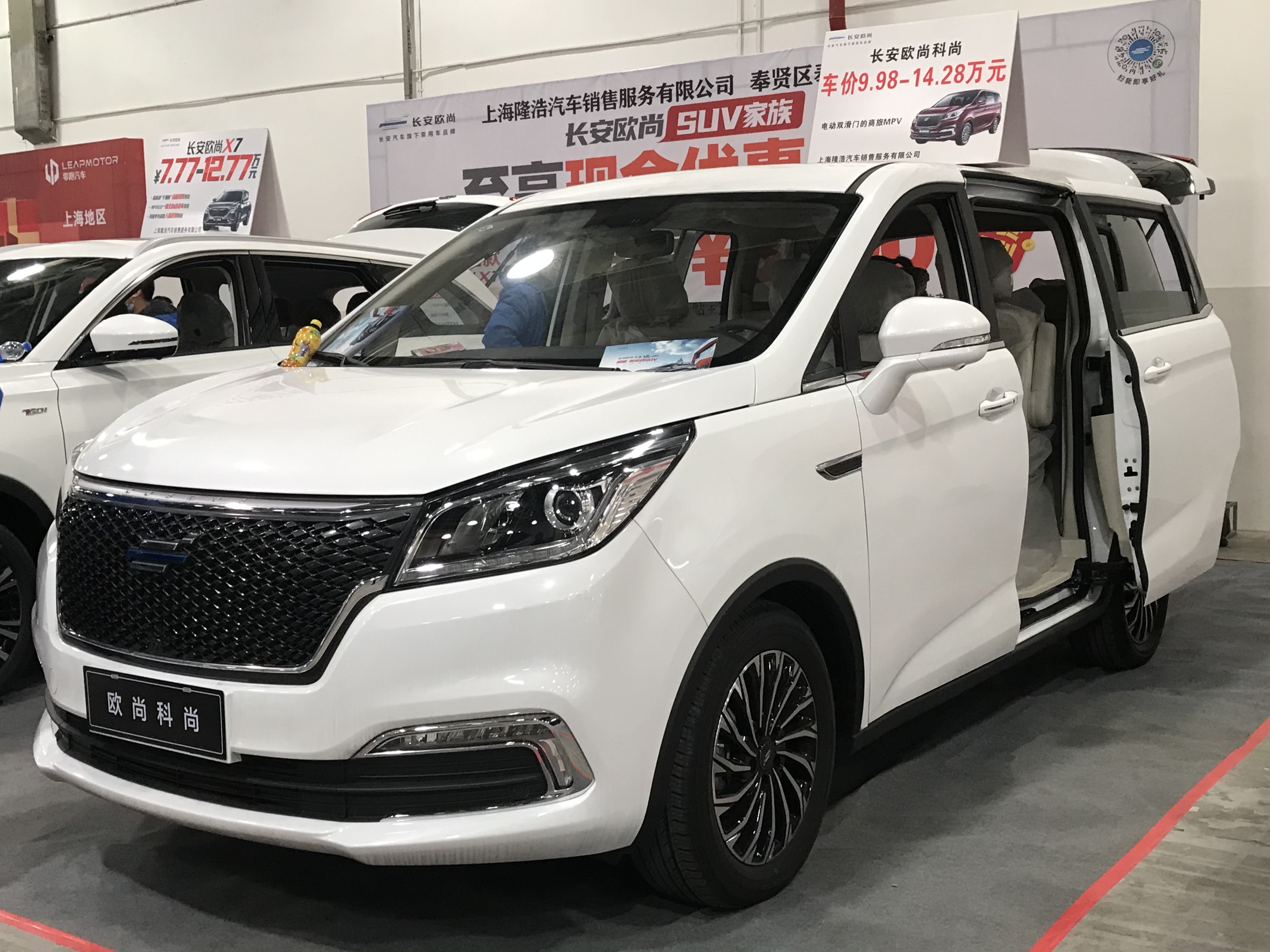
Oushan Cosmos

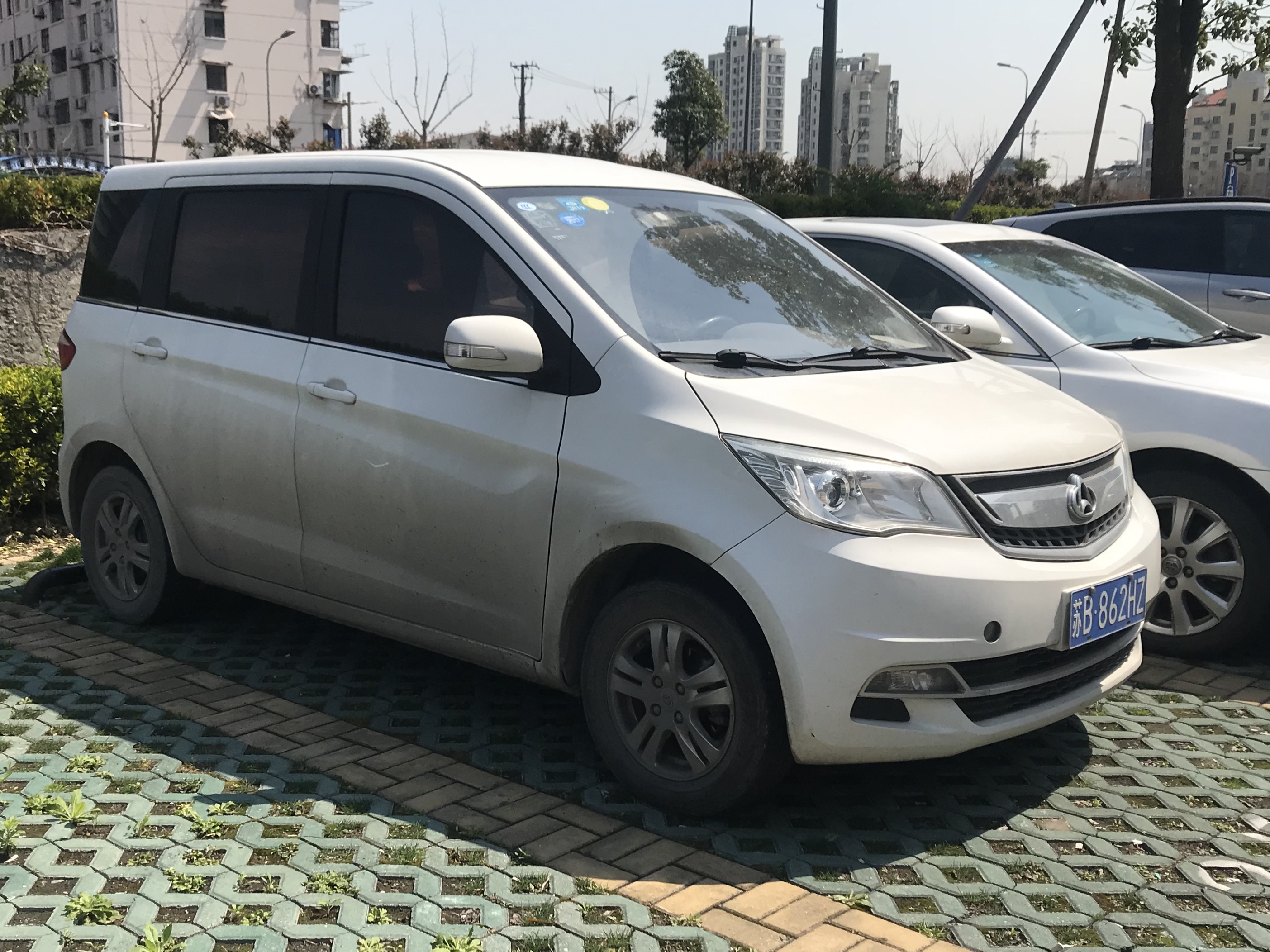
Chana Eulove
