= Oshan Cosmos =

Chinese compact multi-purpose vehicle

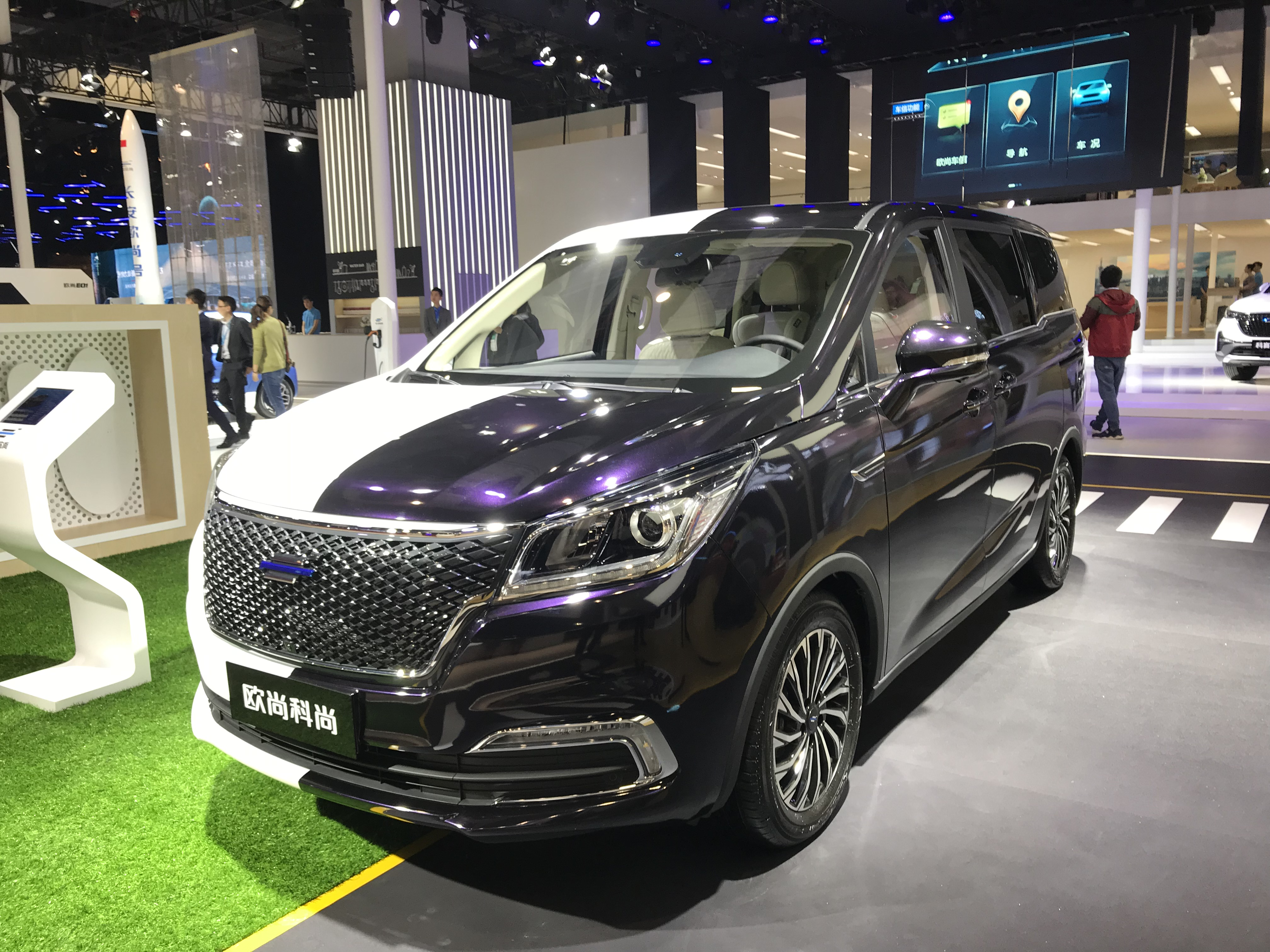
- Oshan Cosmos

Overview
- Manufacturer: Changan Automobile
- Also called: Cos Cosmos
- Production: 2018–2022

Body and chassis
- Class: Minivan (M)
- Body style: 5-door minivan
- Layout: Front-engine, front-wheel-drive

Powertrain
- Engine: Petrol: 1.5L I4 turbo; 1.6L I4
- Transmission: 5-speed manual; 6-speed manual; 7-speed DCT

Dimensions
- Wheelbase: 2,820 mm (111.0 in)
- Length: 4,840 mm (190.6 in)
- Width: 1,860 mm (73.2 in)
- Height: 1,840 mm (72.4 in)
- Curb weight: 1,550–1,710 kg (3,420–3,770 lb)

The Oshan Cosmos is a MPV manufactured by Changan Automobile under the Oshan brand in China.

== Overview ==
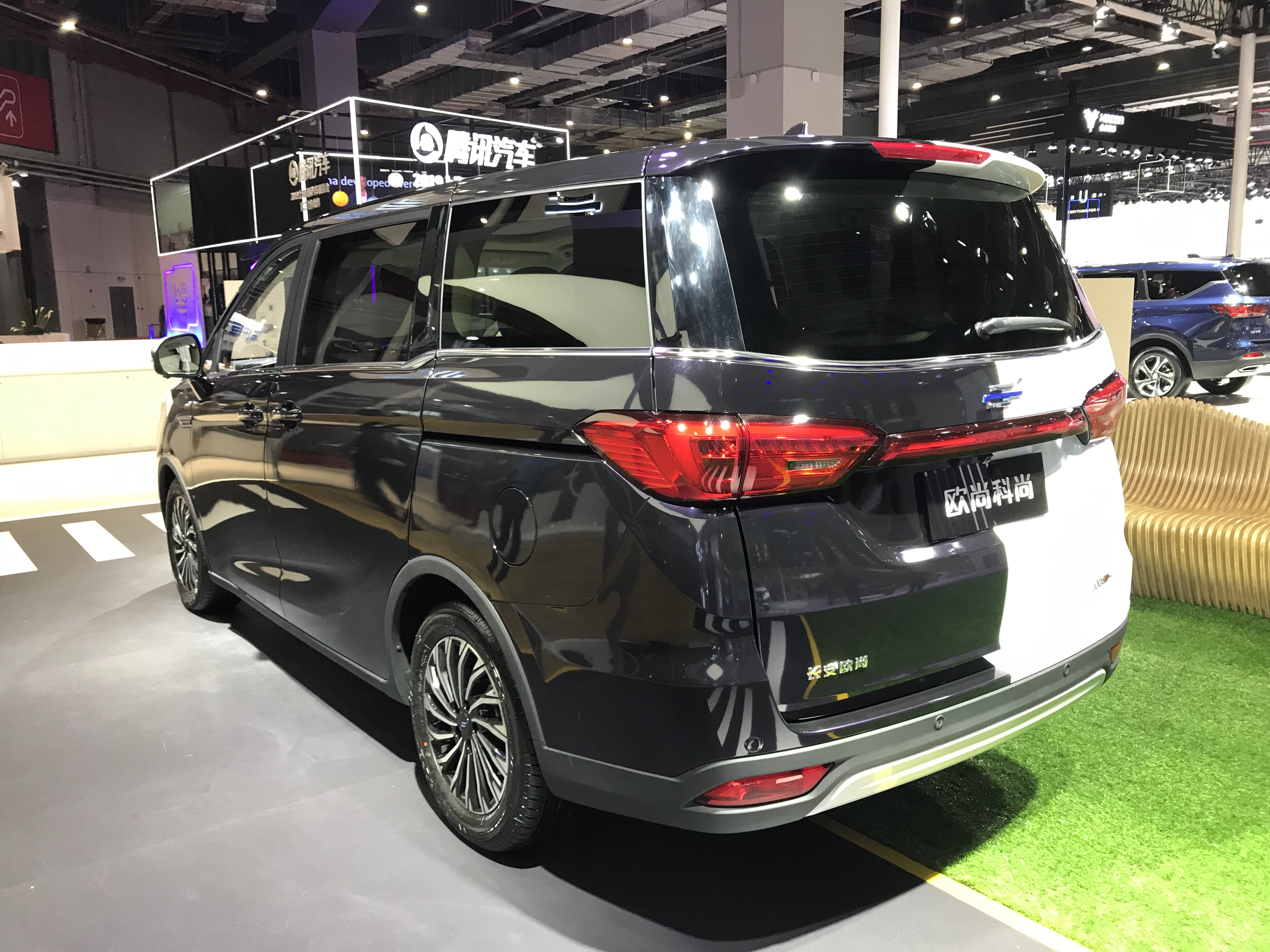
Oushan Cosmos rear quarter

Originally revealed in June 2018, the Cosmos officially debuted at the 2018 Guangzhou Auto Show. The Cosmos MPV is powered by a 1.5 liter turbo engine producing 154 hp (115 kW; 156 PS).
