= Oshan COS1° =

Chinese mid-size crossover SUV

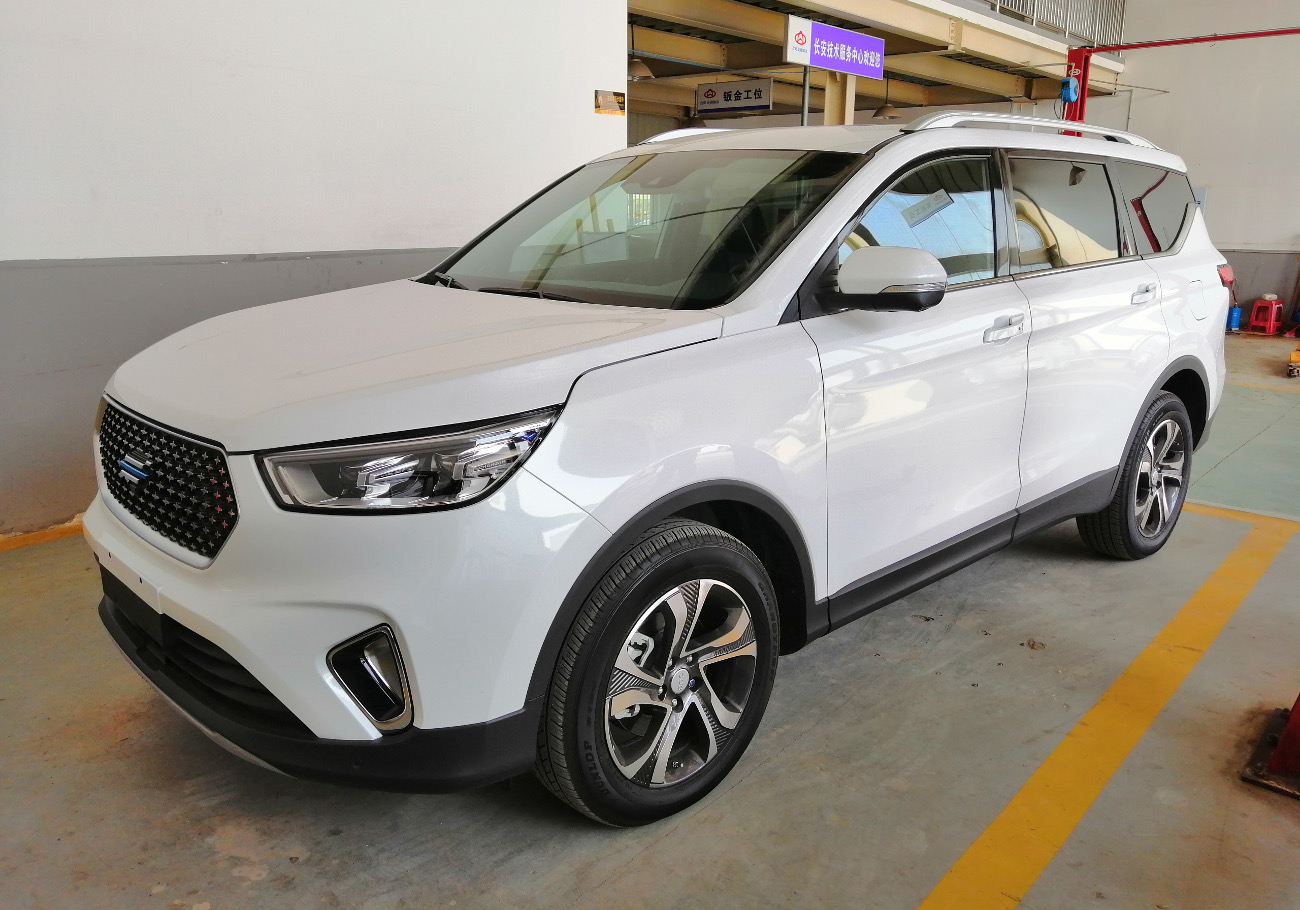
- Oshan COS1° front view (pre-facelift)

Overview
- Manufacturer: Changan Automobile
- Also called: Oshan Kesai
- Production: 2018–2021
- Assembly: China

Body and chassis
- Class: Mid-size crossover SUV
- Body style: 5-door SUV
- Layout: Front-engine, front-wheel-drive

Powertrain
- Engine: Petrol: 1.5 L I4 turbo; 2.0 L I4 turbo
- Power output: 131–174 kW (176–233 hp; 178–237 PS)
- Transmission: 6-speed manual; 6-speed automatic; 8-speed automatic

Dimensions
- Wheelbase: 2,800 mm (110.2 in)
- Length: 4,830 mm (190.2 in)
- Width: 1,868 mm (73.5 in)
- Height: 1,750 mm (68.9 in)
- Curb weight: 1,665 kg (3,671 lb)

The Oshan COS1° (Chinese: 欧尚科赛; pinyin: Ōushàng kēsài) is a 7-seater mid-sized crossover produced by Changan Automobile under the Oshan brand.

== Overview ==
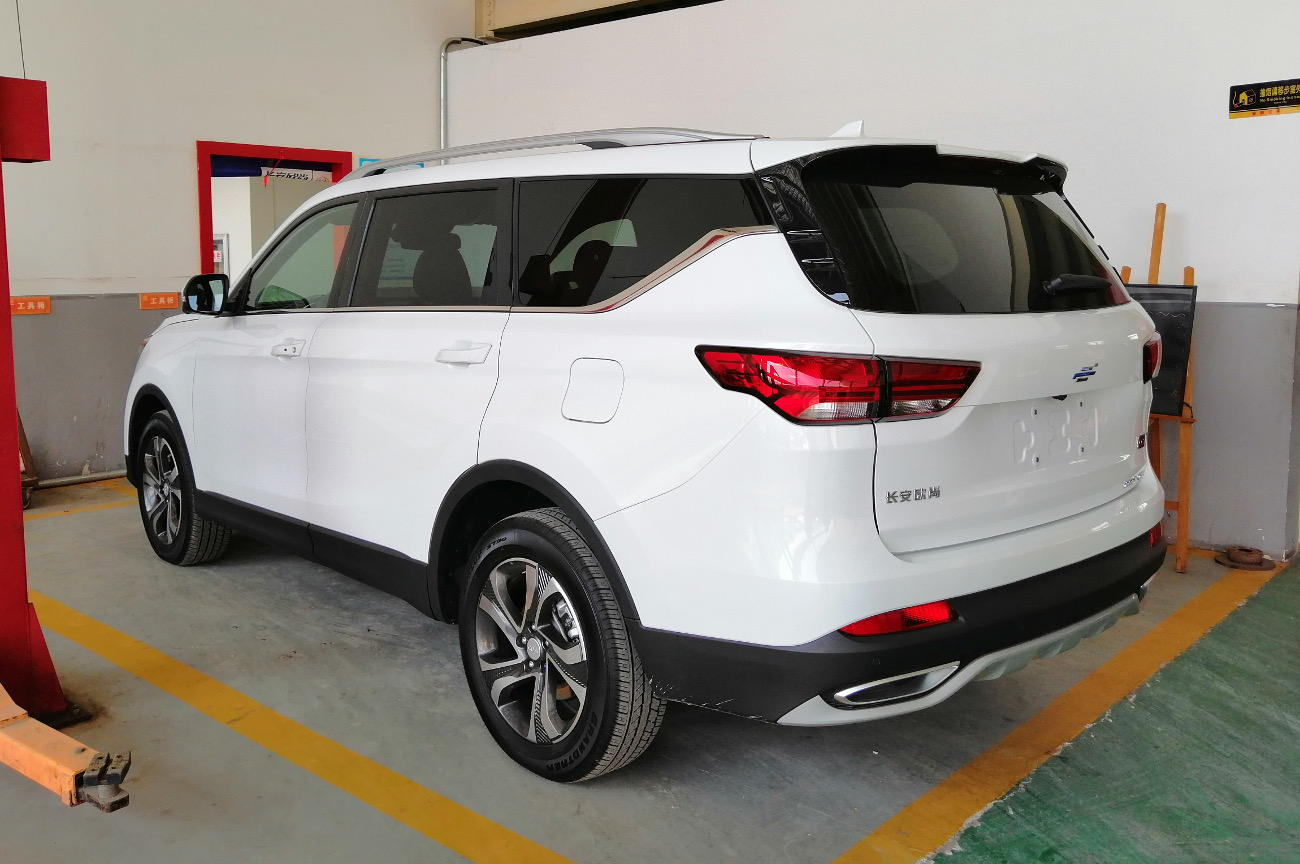
Oshan COS1° rear view (pre-facelift)

The Oshan COS1° debuted on the 2018 Beijing Auto Show and was launched on the Chinese auto market right after with prices ranging from 93,800 yuan to 145,800 yuan. The COS1° was marketed under Oshan, Changan's affordable premium sub-brand that focuses producing compact MPVs and crossovers, with the COS1° being the first product of the brand.

The lone engine of the Oshan COS1° is a 1.5-liter turbo engine producing 178 hp (133 kW; 180 PS) and 265 N⋅m (195 lb⋅ft) of torque.

== Oshan COS1° Pro/GT (2020 facelift) ==
A facelift was revealed at the 2019 Shanghai Auto Show for the 2020 model year called the Oshan COS1° Pro alongside a new sporty variant called the Oshan COS1° GT.

The Oshan COS1° GT/Pro facelift features a slightly restyled front grilles and different front and rear bumpers. The interior remained unchanged from the pre-facelift model, with details such as the leather seats that say "COS" and the steering wheel that says "COS1°".

The engine of the Oshan COS1° GT is a 2.0-liter turbo engine producing 233 hp (174 kW; 236 PS) and 360 N⋅m (266 lb⋅ft) of torque mated to a 8-speed automatic gearbox which is the same setup as the Changan CS85 Coupe.

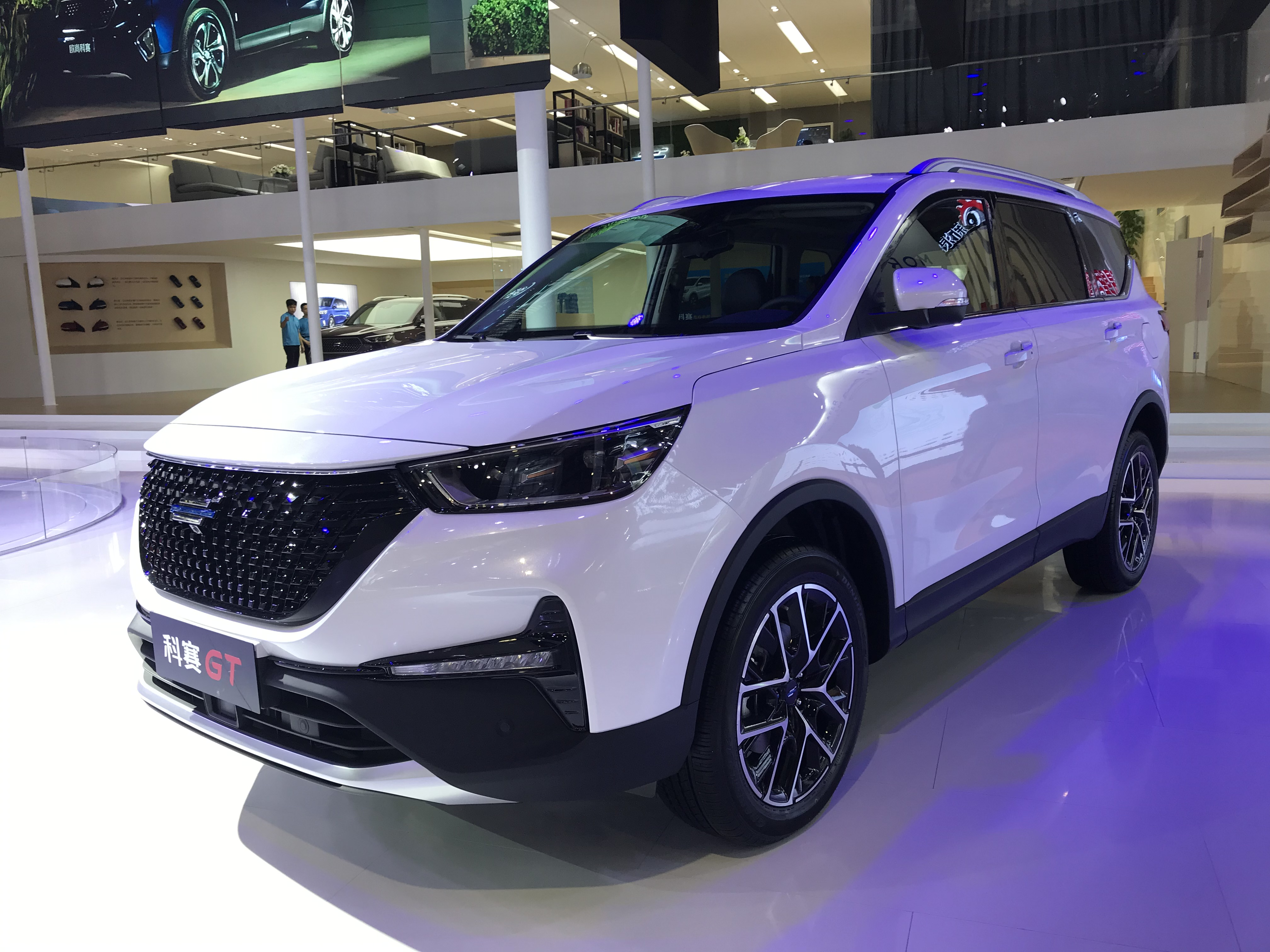
Oshan COS1° GT front view

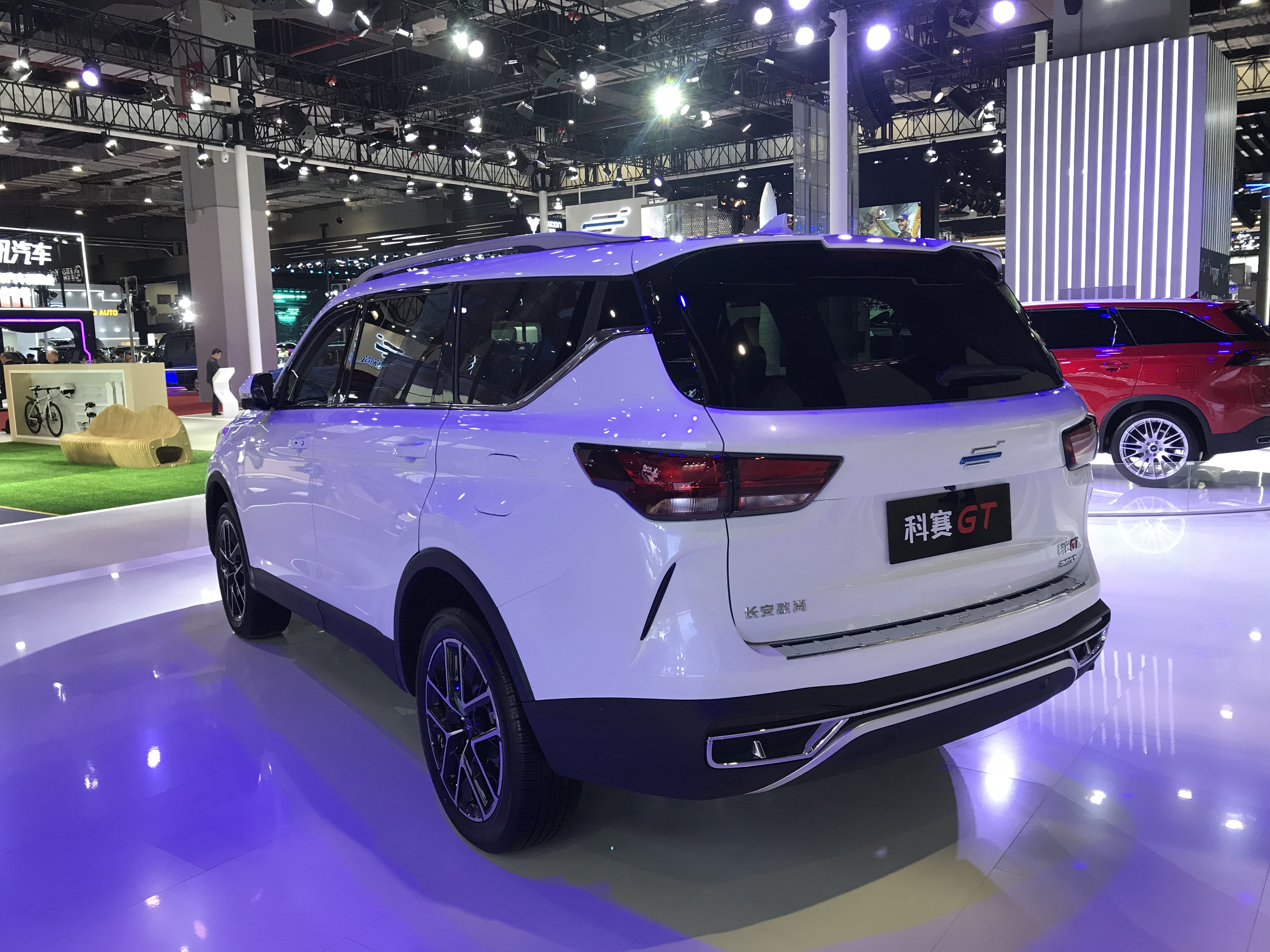
Oshan COS1° GT rear view

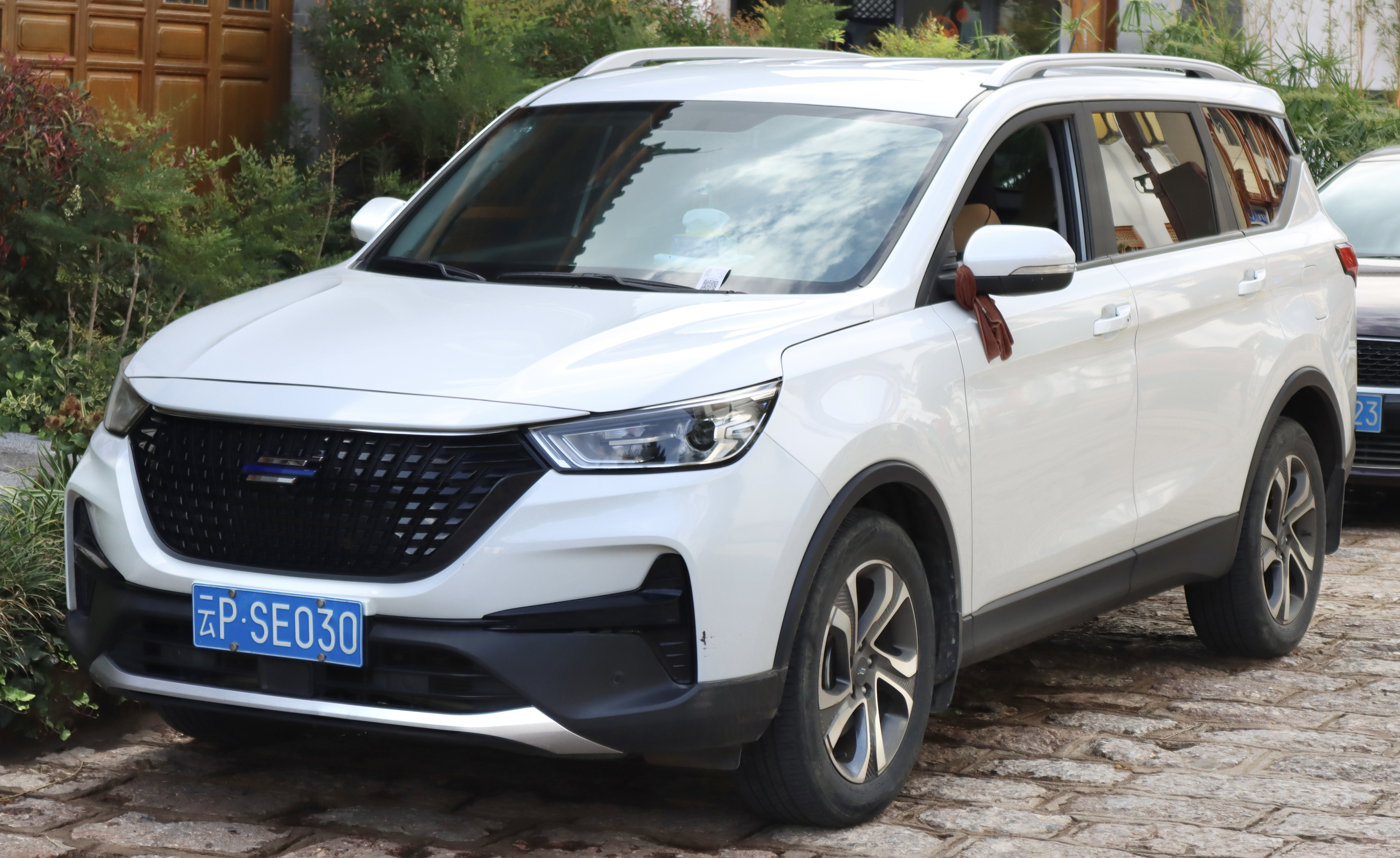
Oshan COS1° Pro
