= Chana CX70 =

Chana/Oshan CX70
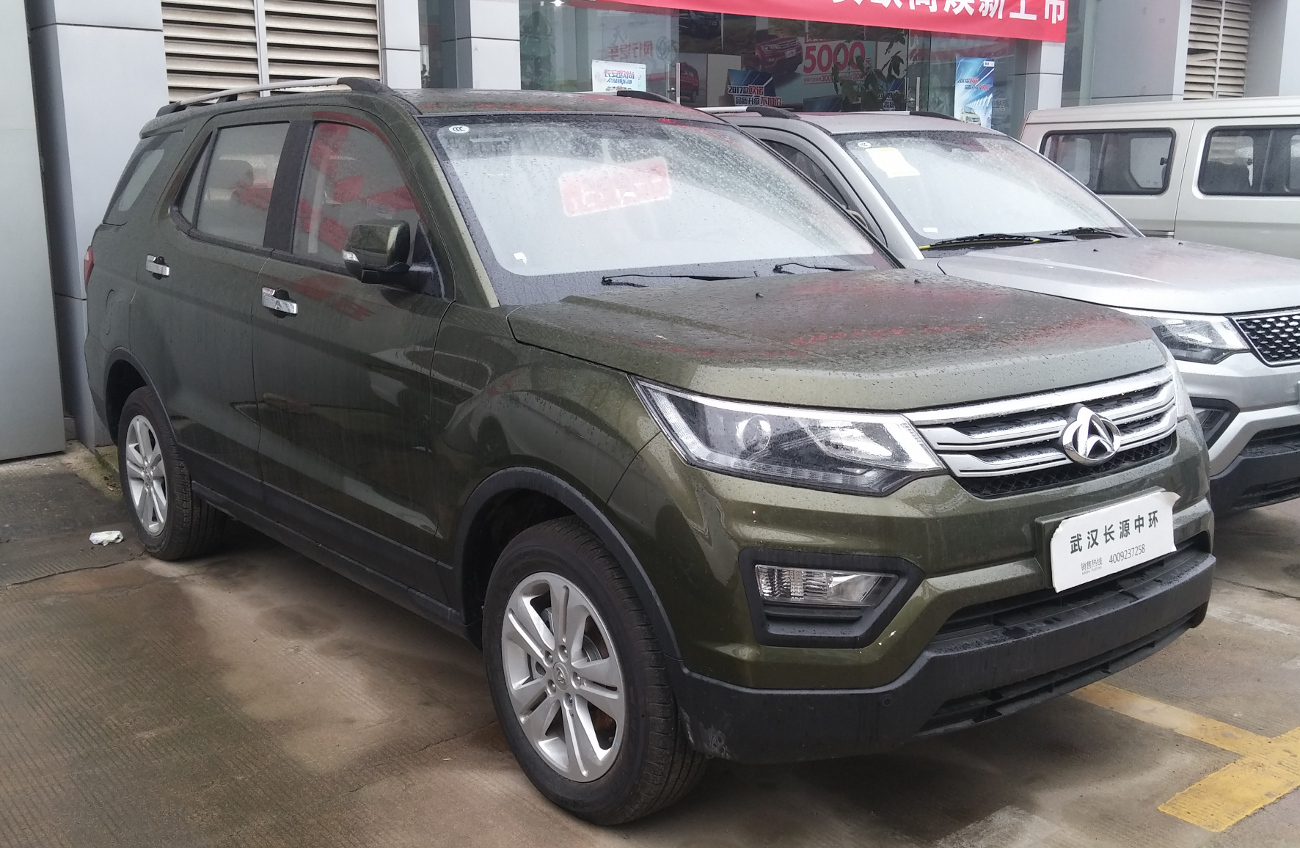
- Chana CX70

Overview
- Manufacturer: Changan Automobile
- Also called: Kaicene CX70; Oshan CX70
- Production: 2016–2019 (China); 2021–2023 (Philippines)
- Assembly: China: Chongqing

Body and chassis
- Class: mid-size crossover
- Body style: 5-door wagon
- Layout: Front-engine, rear-wheel-drive

Powertrain
- Engine: 1.5 L JL476ZQCC turbo I4 (petrol); 1.6 L 4G18 I4 (petrol)
- Transmission: 5-speed manual 6 speed automatic

Dimensions
- Wheelbase: 2,780 mm (109.4 in)
- Length: 4,680 mm (184.3 in)
- Width: 1,800 mm (70.9 in)
- Height: 1,750 mm (68.9 in)

The Chana CX70, more recently the Oshan CX70 as Chana has developed a new brand, is a 7-seater, rear-wheel drive mid-size crossover produced by Changan Automobile. In most export markets, it is known as the Kaicene CX70.

== Overview ==
The Chana CX70 debuted on the 2016 Beijing Auto Show and was launched on the Chinese auto market right after with prices ranging from 68,900 yuan to 84,900 yuan. The CX70 is manufactured by Chana, Changan's commercial division, also later known as Oushang. Oushang was known for producing minivans and mini MPVs, making the CX70 the first crossover of the brand. A turbocharged version called the Chana CX70T was also available, with styling changes on the grilles, with an asymmetrical design positioning the brand logo on the right half of the grilles heavily inspired by Land Rover.

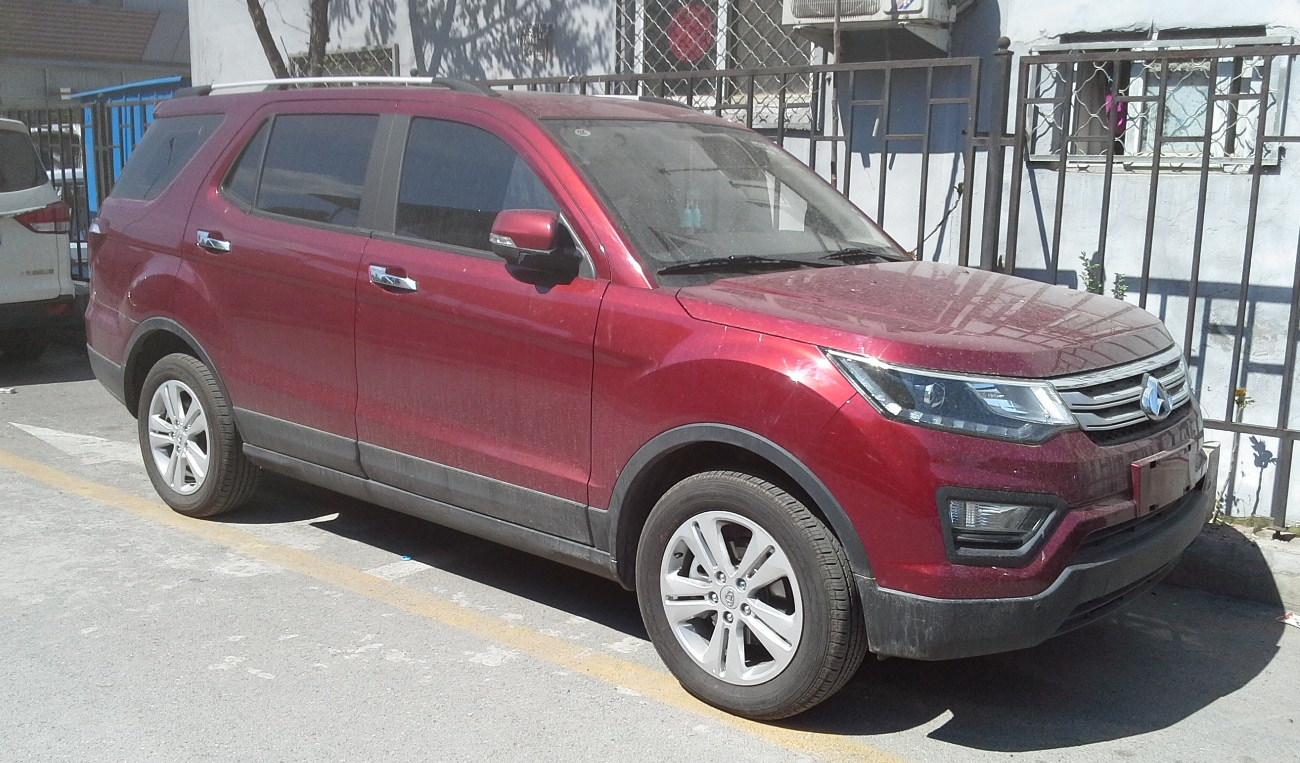
Chana CX70

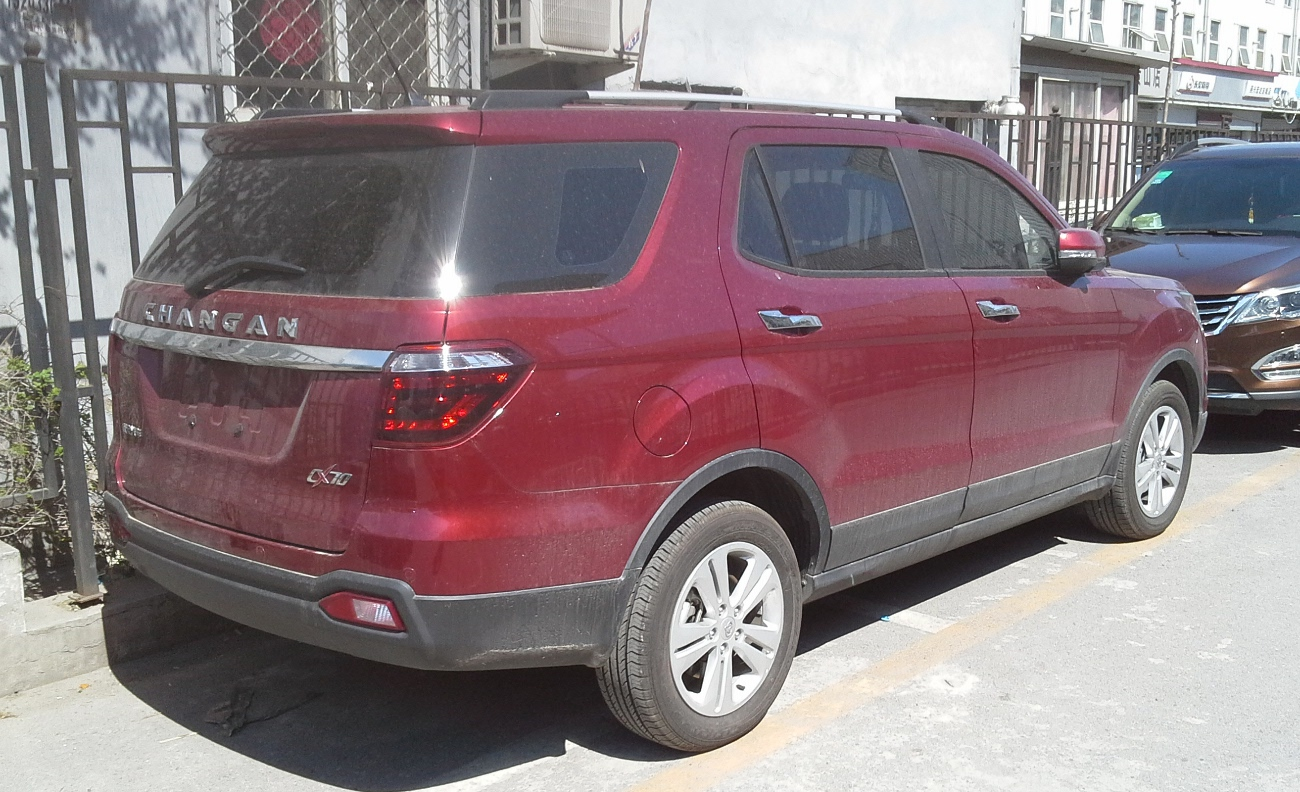
Chana CX70
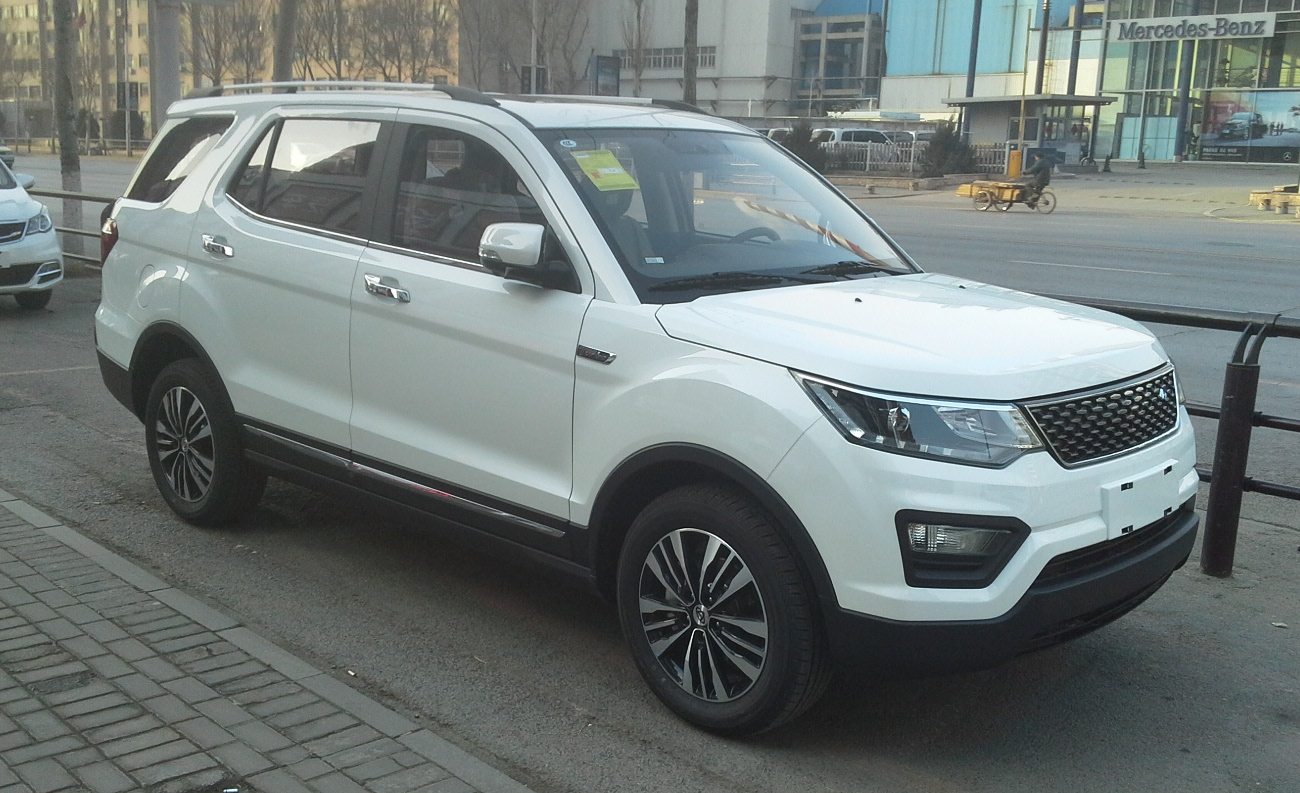
Chana CX70T

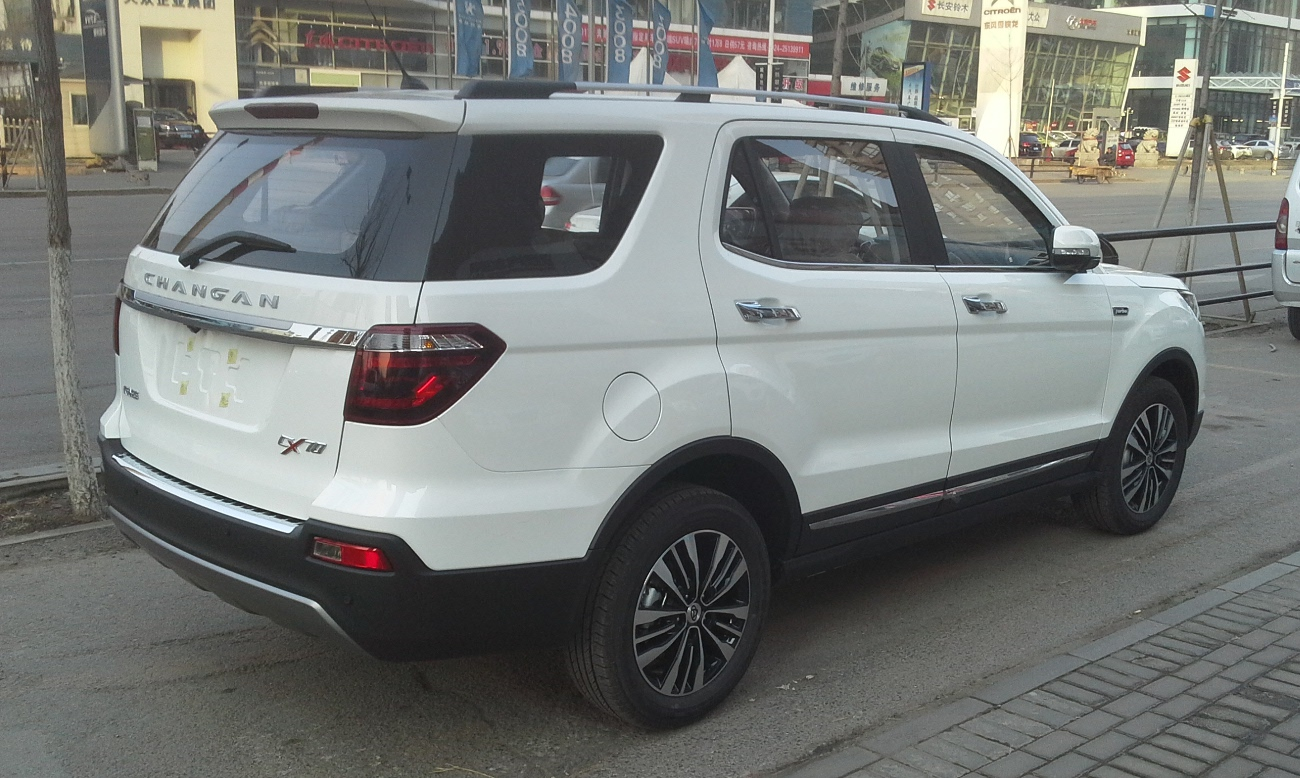
Chana CX70T

=== Powertrain ===
Powering the CX70T is a 1.5-liter turbocharged gasoline engine producing 150 PS and 230 Nm of torque mated to a six-speed automatic transmission.

=== Kaicene CX70 ===
In Philippines, from 2021, the Berjaya Auto Asia (BAAI) introduced the turbo variant of the CX70 7-seat crossover SUV under the Kaciene brand.
