= Oshan Changxing =

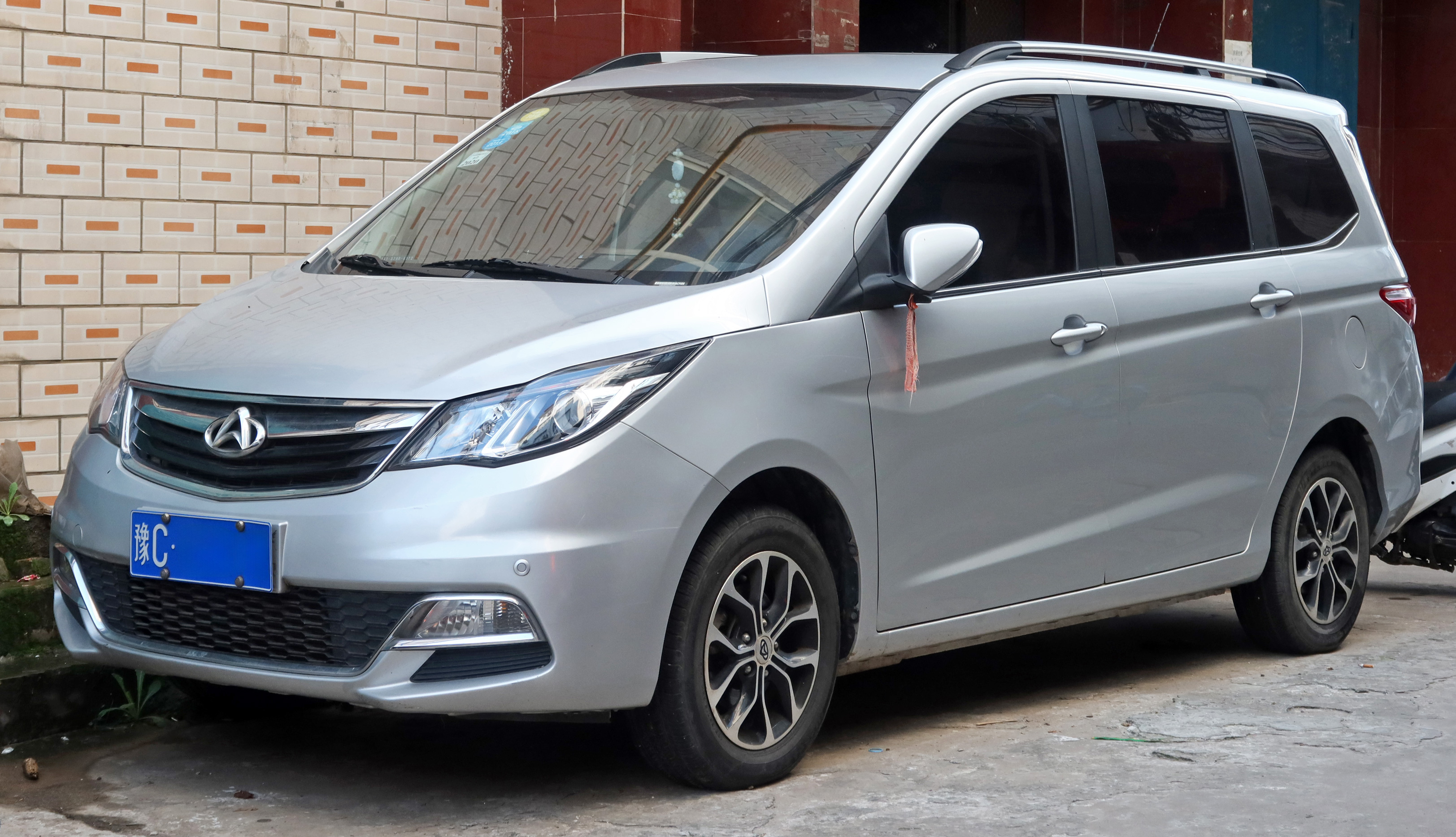
- Chang'an Oushang MPV

Overview
- Manufacturer: Changan Automobile
- Also called: Oushang A600; Chana Oushang MPV
- Production: 2015–2022
- Model years: 2015–2022

Body and chassis
- Class: Compact MPV
- Body style: 5-door wagon
- Layout: Front-engine, front-wheel-drive

Powertrain
- Engine: 1.5 L I4 (turbo petrol); 1.0 L I4 turbo (petrol)
- Transmission: 5-speed manual 6-speed automatic

Dimensions
- Wheelbase: 2,700 mm (106.3 in); 2,680 mm (105.5 in) (2020 A600)
- Length: 4,510 mm (177.6 in); 4,520 mm (178.0 in) (Changxing EV); 4,475 mm (176.2 in) (2020 A600)
- Width: 1,725 mm (67.9 in)
- Height: 1,700 mm (66.9 in); 1,707 mm (67.2 in) (Changxing EV); 1,685 mm (66.3 in)(2020 A600)

The Oshan Changxing, or originally the Oushang MPV and later the Oushang A600 is a 7-seater Compact MPV produced by Changan Automobile under the Chana or Oushan (Oushang) brand.

== Oushang MPV and Oushang A600 ==
The Oushang MPV was launched on the Chinese auto market in August 2015 with prices ranging from 56,900 yuan to 84,900 yuan. The name was later revised to Oushang A600 when Oushang became a whole series of vehicles.

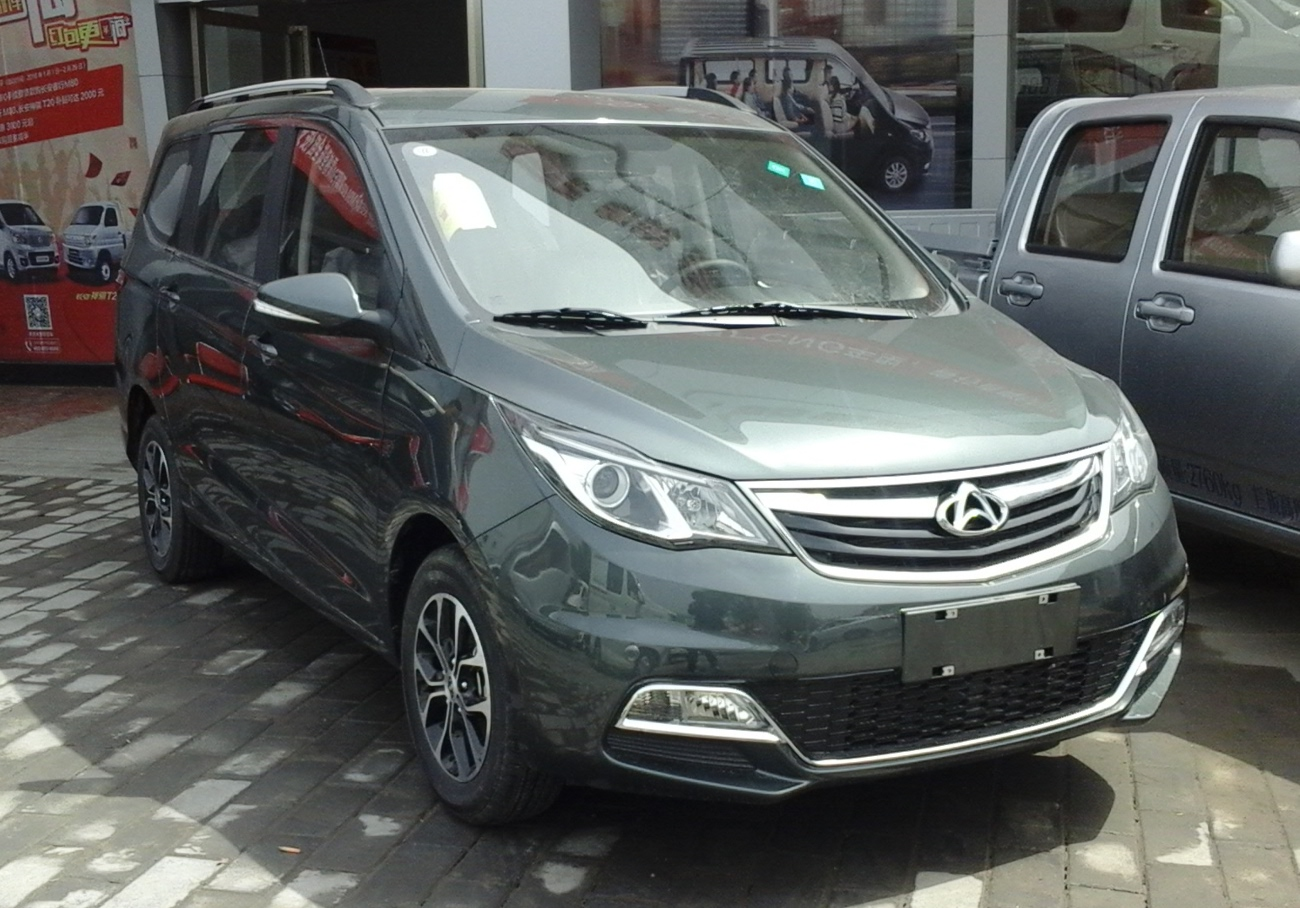
Oushang A600

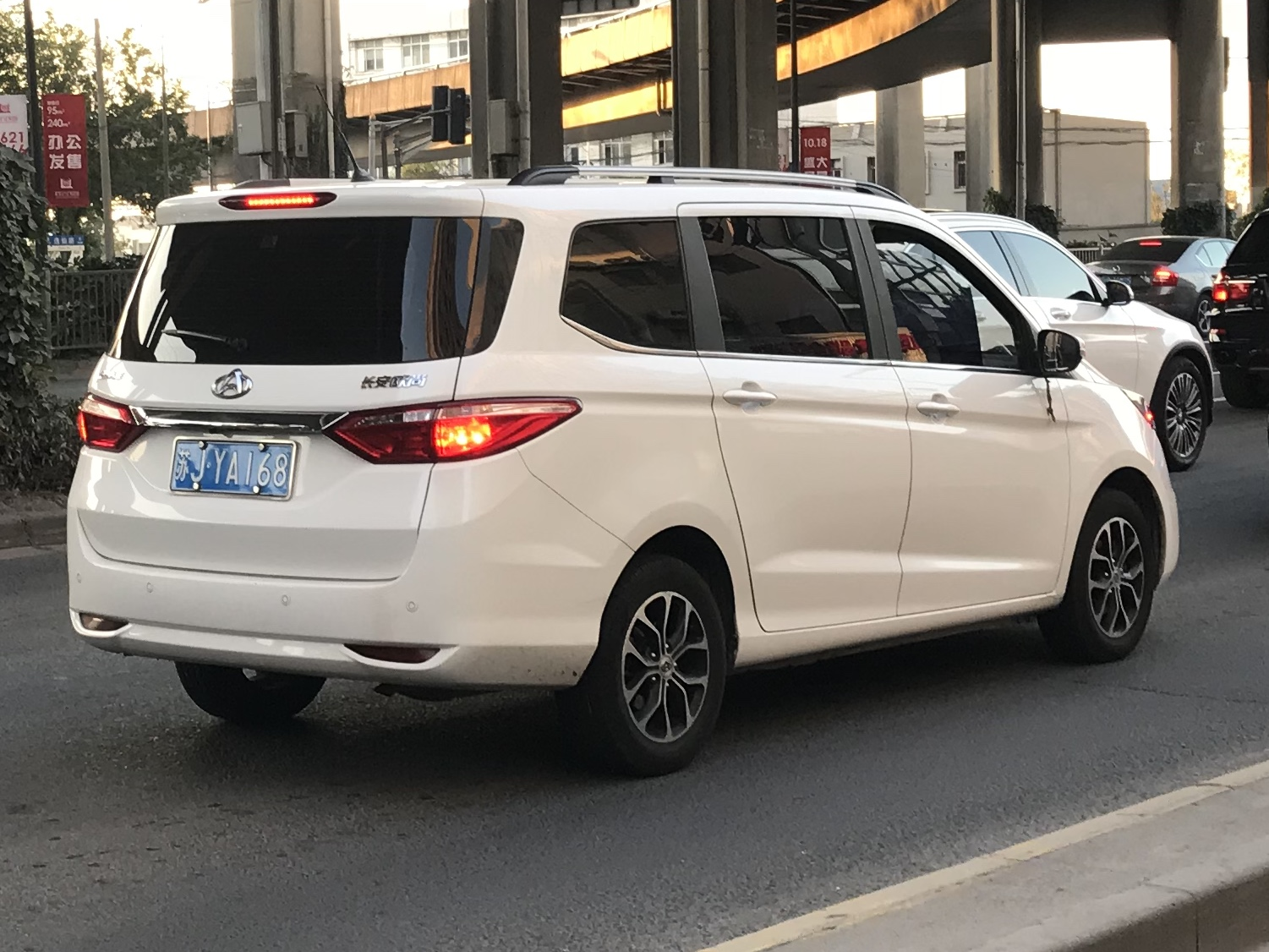
Oushang A600 rear

=== Engines ===
The A600 is powered by a 1.5-litre inline-4 engine and a 1.0-litre turbo inline-4 engine. The 1.5-litre engine is mated to a five-speed manual transmission, and the 1.0-litre turbo engine is connected to a six-speed automatic transmission.

=== A600 EV ===
The A600 EV is the pure electric version of the A600, and was launched in 2019. The A600 EV is available as a 5-seater and a 6-seater configuration. Power of the A600 EV comes from a 90 kW（122 hp）permanent magnetic motor with a range of 405 km.

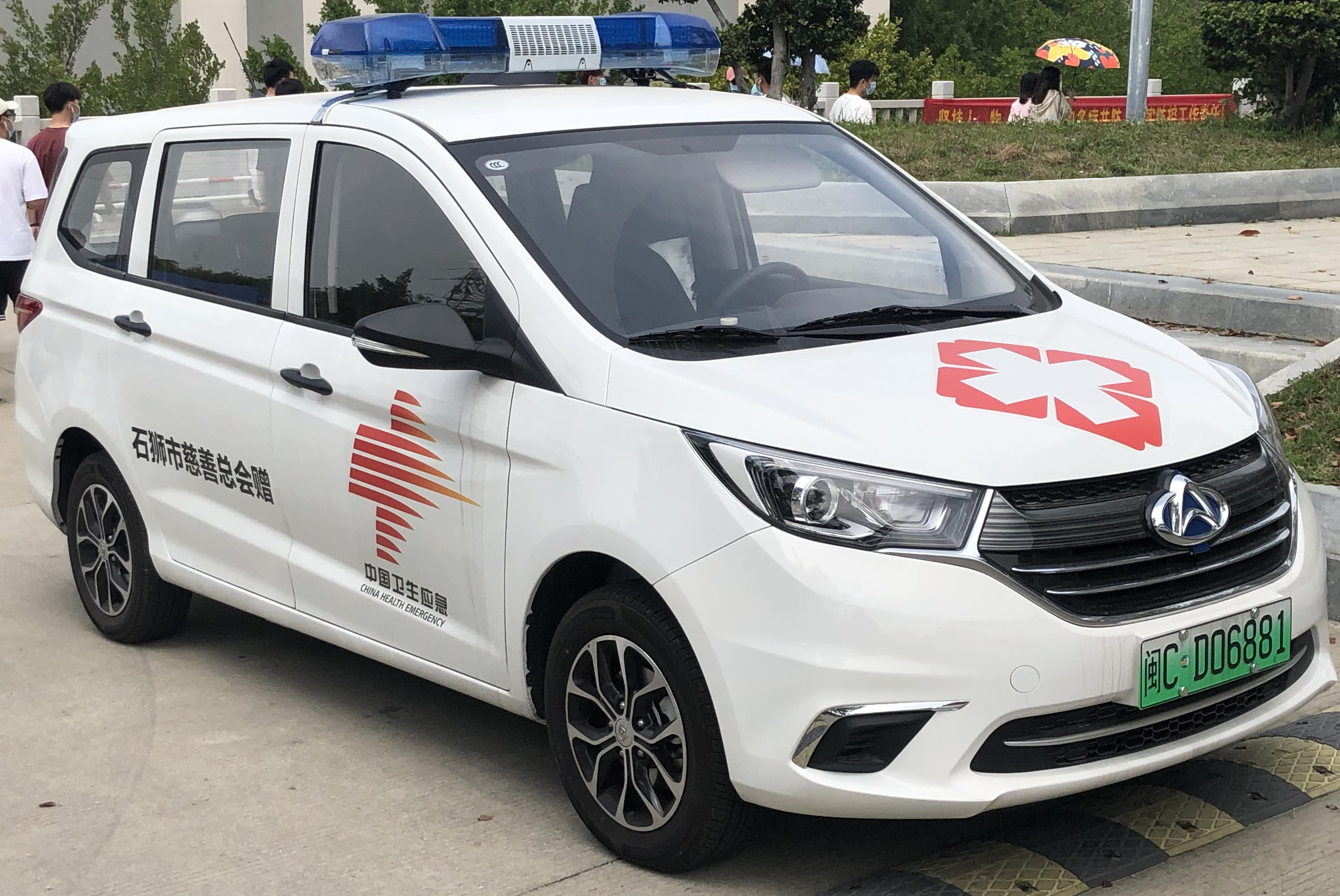
Oushang A600 EV

=== 2020 facelift ===
Despite the launch of the more upmarket Changxing facelift variant in 2018, the Oushang A600 received a facelift in 2020 updating mainly the front fascia design. The 2020 model is available as a 5-seater and a 7-seater with a 2-3-2 seat setup. The engine of the 2020 A600 is a 1.5-litre naturally aspirated engine producing 107 hp and 145N·m mated to a five-speed manual transmission. The vehicles matches the National VI b Emissions Standard in China.

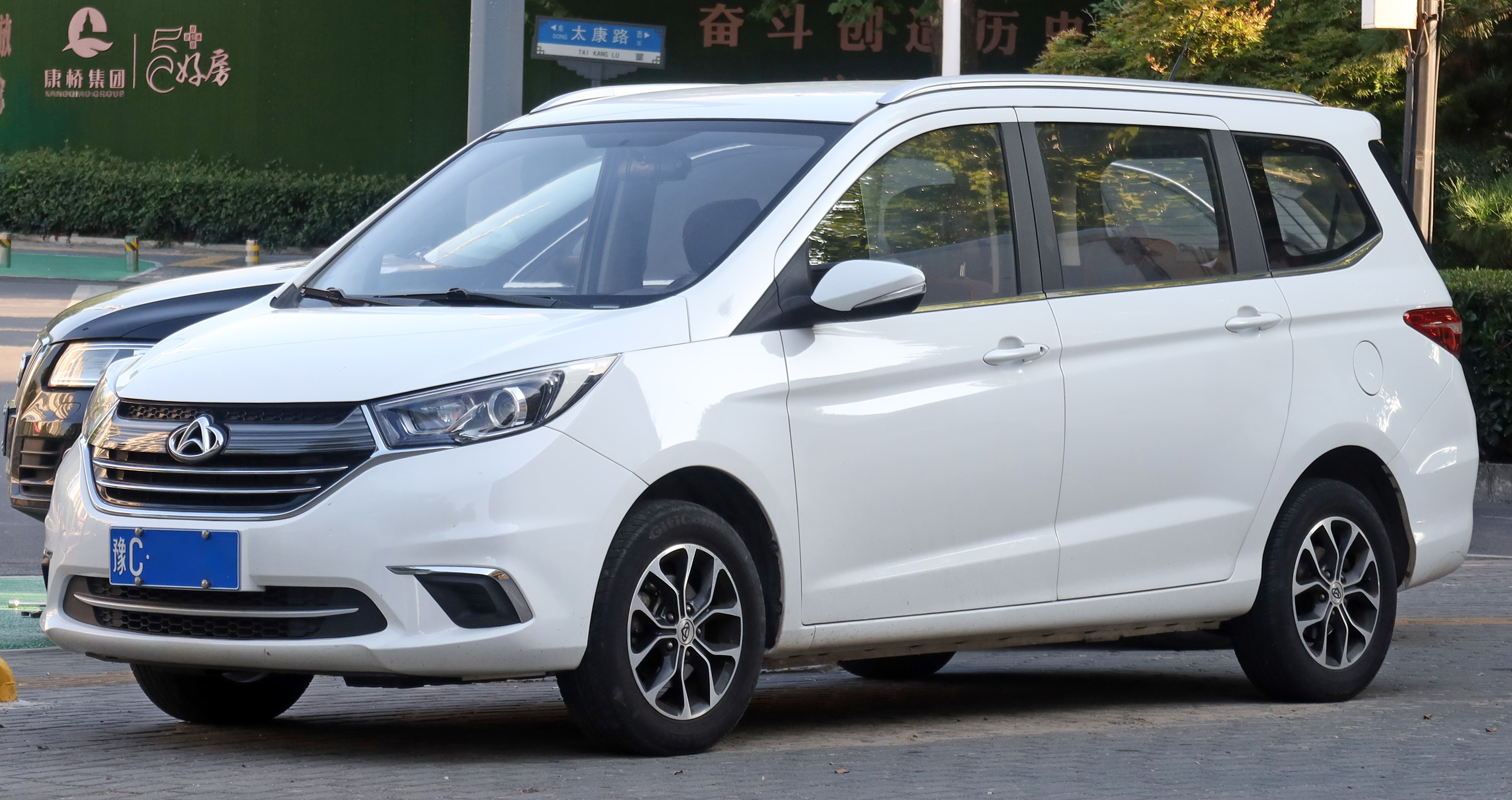
Facelift model, high trim

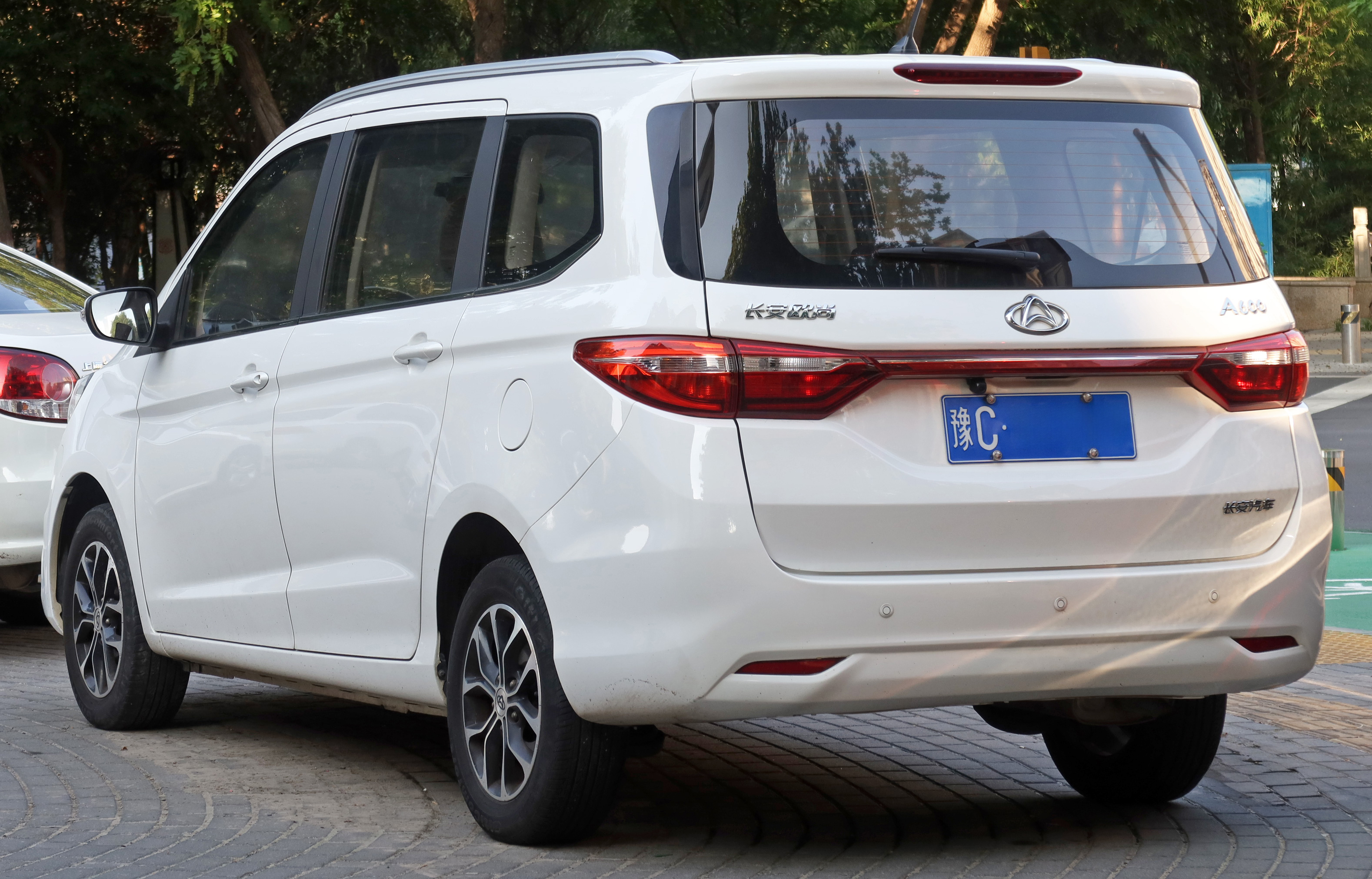
Rear view

== Oshan Changxing ==
The Oshan Changxing (欧尚长行) is a facelift of the A600 after the brand was relaunched with the Oshan (Oushang/ Oushan) name. The Changxing was launched in October 2018 with a 1.5-litre inline-4 engine and a 1.6-litre inline-4 engine available. The 1.5-litre engine is mated to a five-speed manual transmission, and the 1.6-litre engine is connected to a six-speed automatic transmission. As of 2020, only the 1.5-litre engine mated to a five-speed manual transmission is available for the 2020 model year.

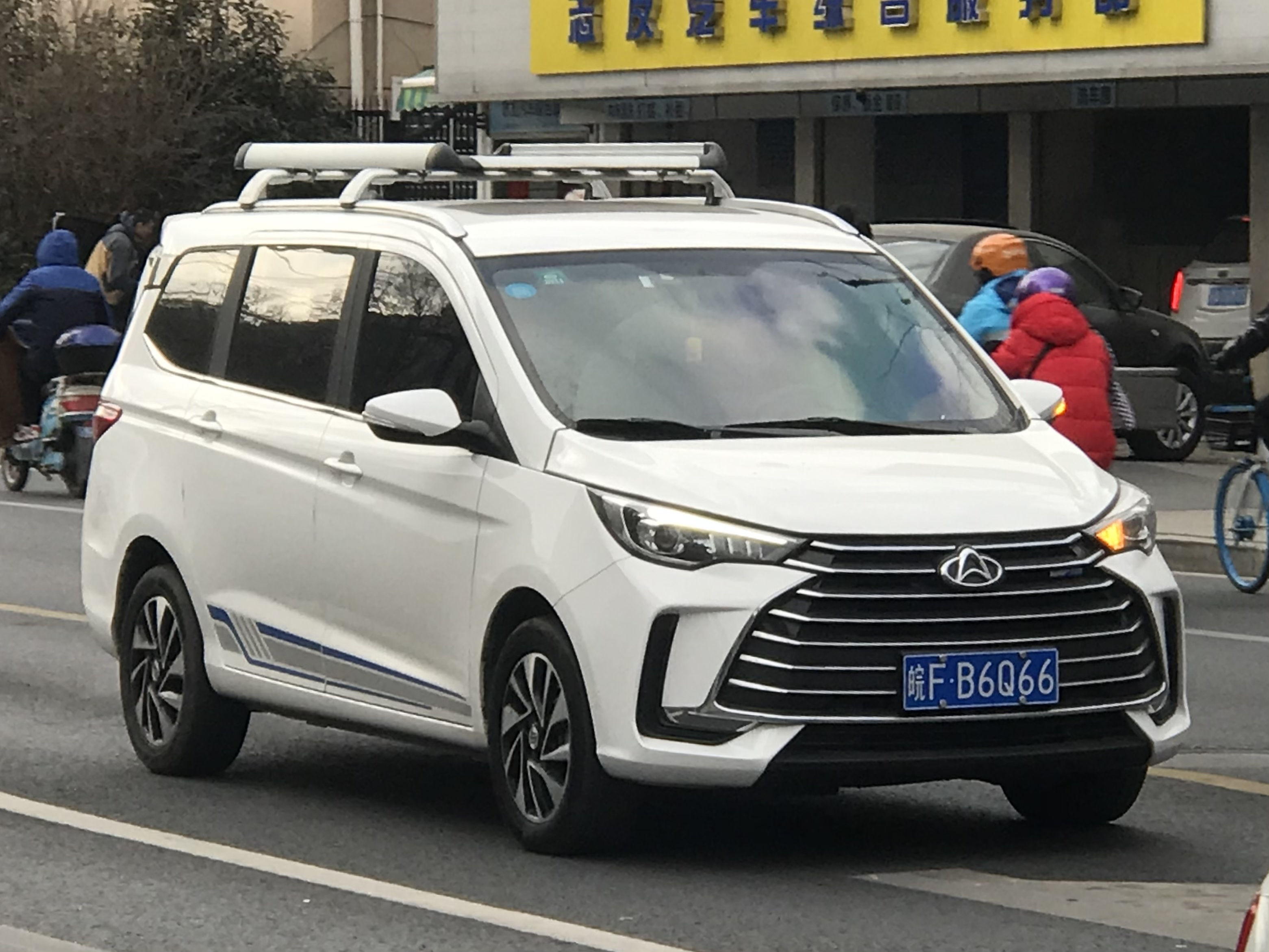
Oshan Changxing

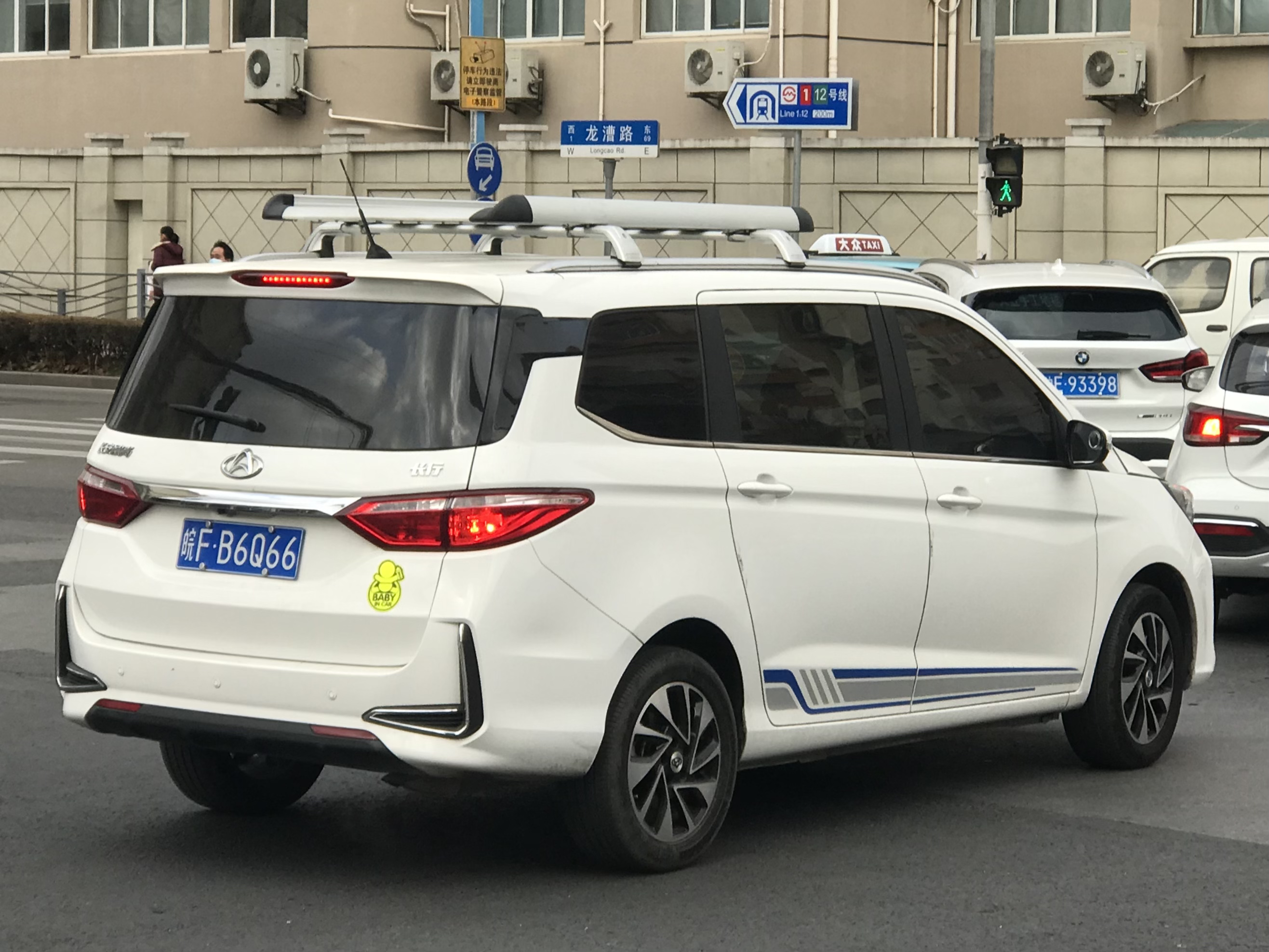
Oshan Changxing rear

An entry model of the Oshan Changxing was launched in June 2020 with the 1.5-litre inline-4 engine mated to a five-speed manual transmission as the standard powertrain. The entry model deletes the floating roof design and the chrome trim between the tail lamps is replaced by a faux light strip. The entry model further lowers the price to 59,900 RMB in China.

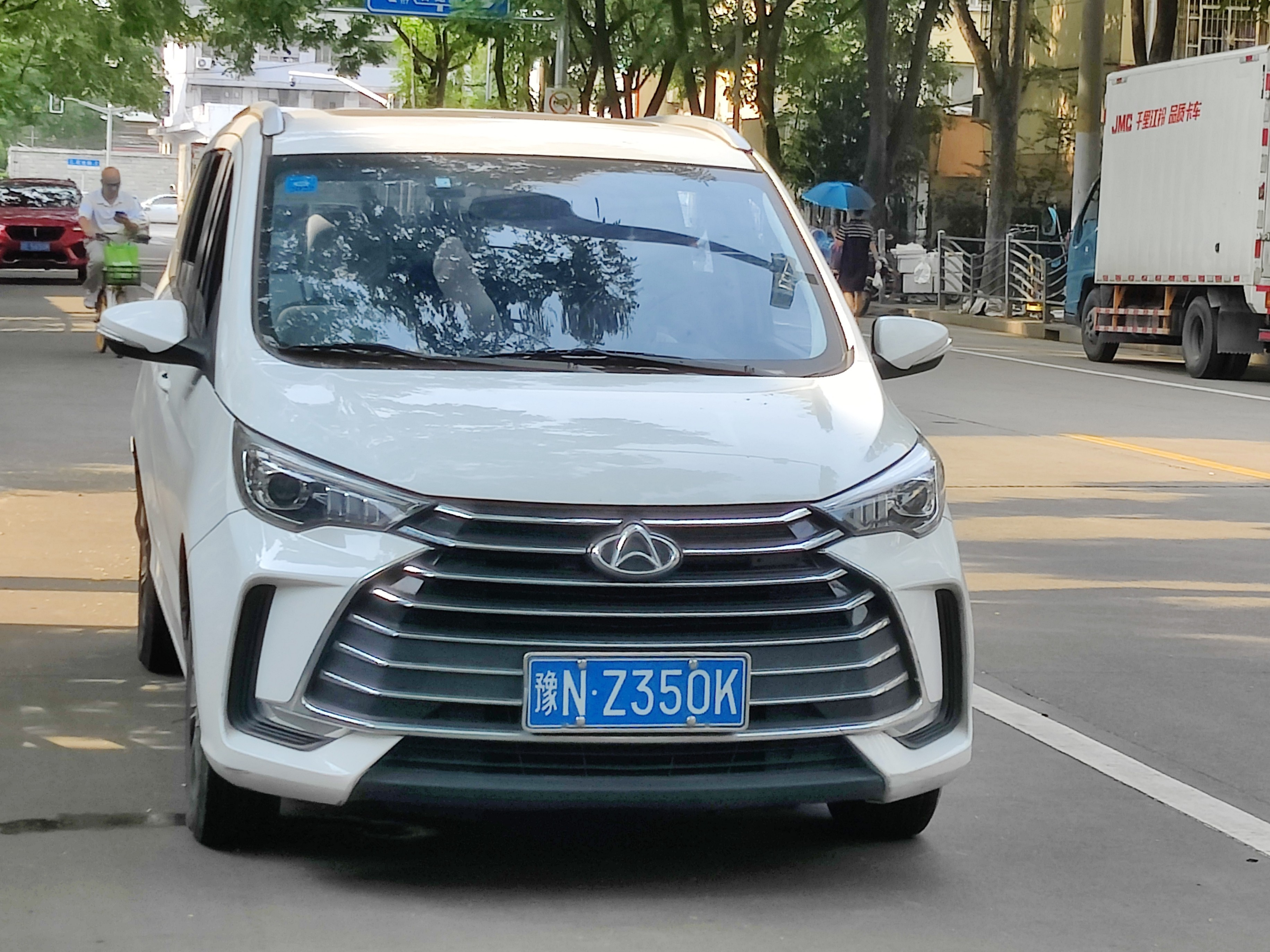
Oshan Changxing entry model

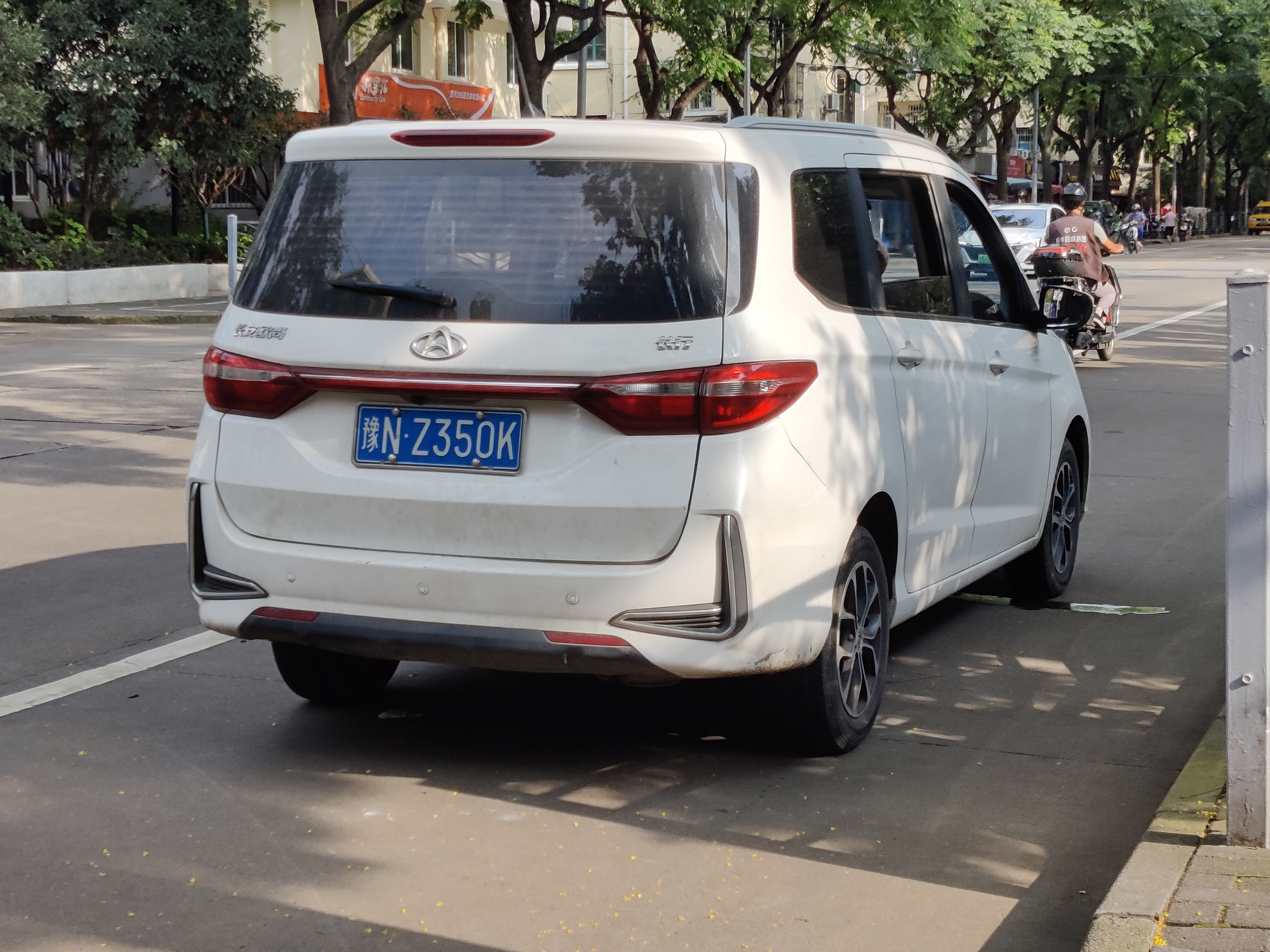
Oshan Changxing entry model rear

=== Oushan Changxing EV ===
The Oushan Changxing EV launched in 2019 is the pure electric version of the Oushan Changxing and is based on the A600 EV. The Changxing EV is powered by a 90 kW and 250N·m permanent magnetic motor. The battery is a 54.66kWh battery and the NEDC range is 405 km. The energy consumption is 13.486kWh/100 km.
