= Changan CS55 =

Chinese compact crossover SUV

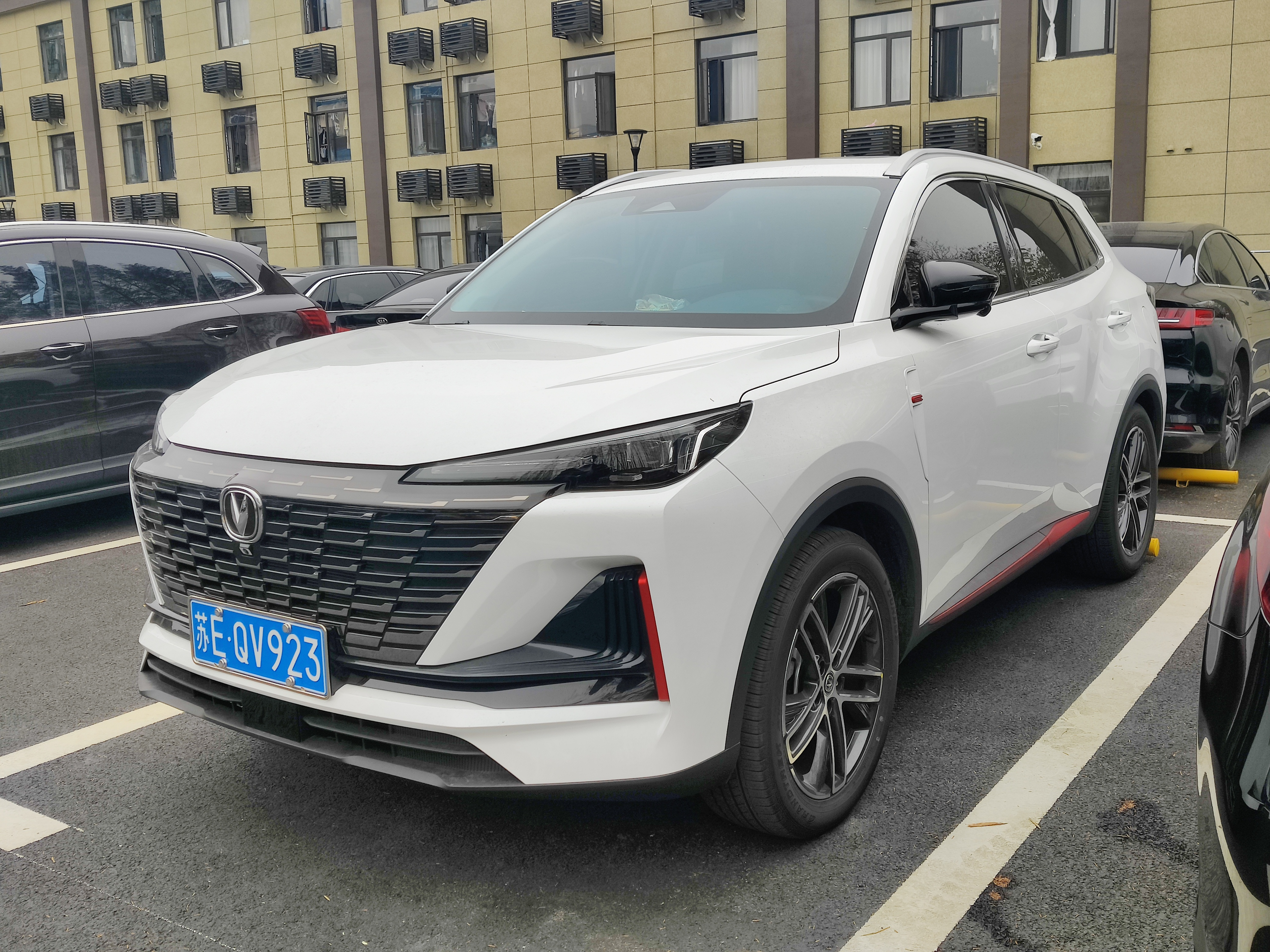
- Changan CS55 Plus II

Overview
- Manufacturer: Changan Automobile
- Production: 2017–present
- Assembly: China: Chongqing; Iran: Kashan (Saipa)

Body and chassis
- Class: Compact crossover SUV (C)
- Body style: 5-door SUV
- Layout: Front-engine, front-wheel-drive

The Changan CS55 is a compact SUV produced by the Chinese manufacturer Changan Automobile under the Changan marque since 2017. It debuted at the 2017 Shanghai Auto Show and was launched on the Chinese auto market later in 2017. The manufacturer announced a full-electric version on 9 July 2020 called the CS55 EV. A facelift in 2019 updated the name to Changan CS55 Plus

The second generation Changan CS55 Plus was introduced in March 2021 and was called Changan UNI-S in the Middle East. It received a facelift which marketed as "third generation CS55 Plus" in 2025 and 2026 with revised design.

== First generation ==
Changan CS55
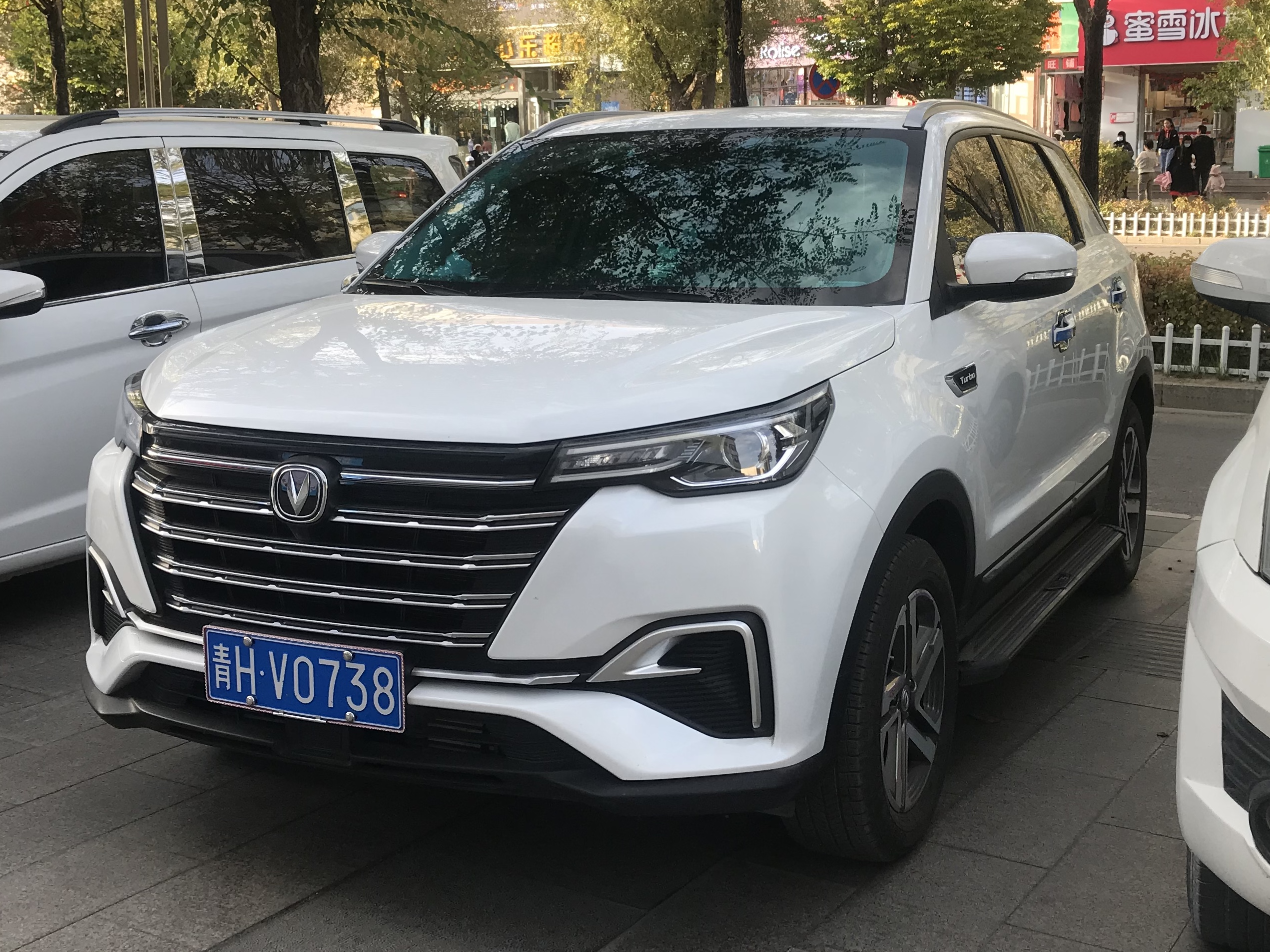
- Changan CS55 Plus (2019 facelift)

Overview
- Manufacturer: Changan Automobile
- Production: 2017–2024
- Model years: 2017–2024
- Assembly: China: Chongqing

Body and chassis
- Class: Compact crossover SUV (C)
- Body style: 5-door SUV
- Layout: Front-engine, front-wheel-drive
- Related: Changan CS75

Powertrain
- Engine: 1.5 L JL476ZQCD I4 (turbo petrol)
- Transmission: 6-speed manual 6-speed automatic

Dimensions
- Wheelbase: 2,650 mm (104.3 in)
- Length: 4,500 mm (177.2 in)
- Width: 1,855 mm (73.0 in)
- Height: 1,690 mm (66.5 in)

The first generation Changan CS55 is a compact crossover SUV produced by Changan Automobile, and was launched at the 2017 Shanghai Auto Show. Pricing for the CS55 ranges from 74,900 yuan to 86,900 yuan, slotting the five-seat CS55 below the similarly sized Changan CS75.

The Changan CS55 is powered by a 1.5 liter turbocharged inline-4 petrol engine with variable valve timing on both inlet and exhaust camshafts producing 156 bhp and 225 nm (165 lb ft) mated to a 6-speed manual transmission or 6-speed automatic transmission by Aisin Warner.

The suspension features struts at the front, a multi-link axle at the rear, and anti-roll bars front and rear. It is equipped with electric power steering and the brakes are vented discs at the front and solid at the rear. A subframe carries the powertrain and front suspension.

The styling was developed by Changan's Turin design studio. However, the CUV was controversial styling wise as the CS55 was criticized for resembling the Land Rover Discovery Sport.

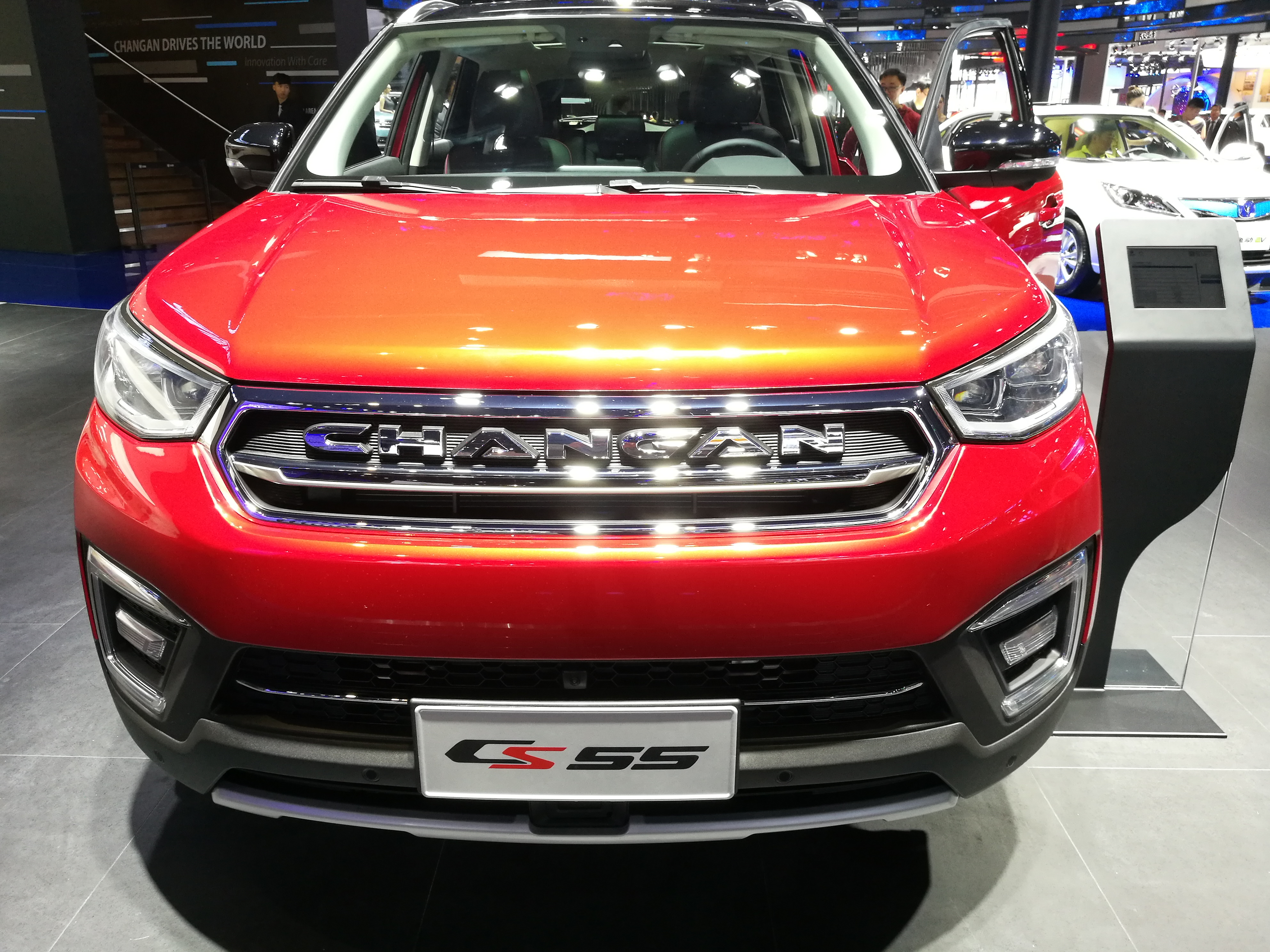
Launch of the Changan CS55 during the 2017 Shanghai Auto Show.

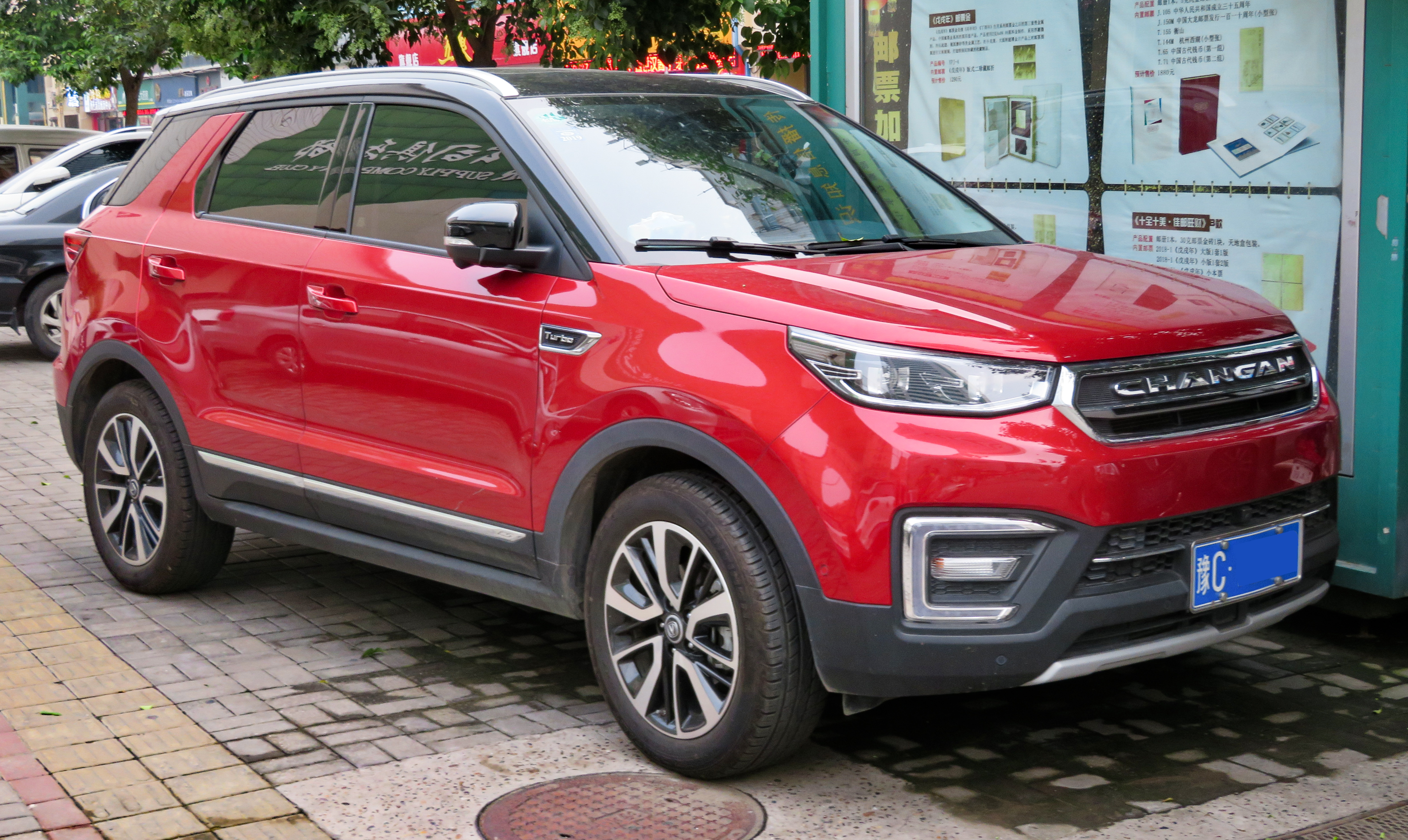
Changan CS55 pre-facelift (front)

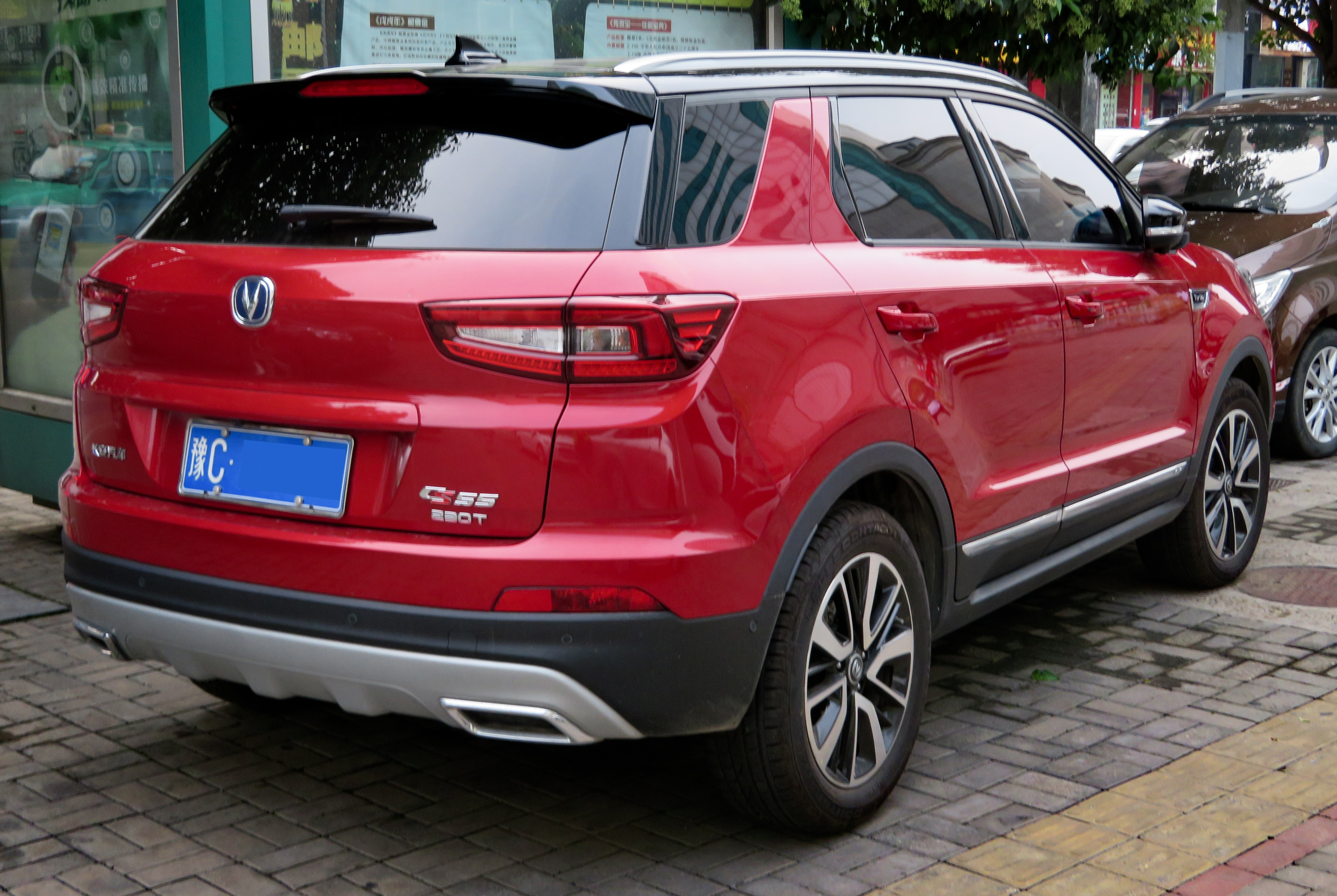
Changan CS55 pre-facelift (rear)

=== 2018 facelift ===
A facelift was launched in 2018 changing mainly the front bumper and grilles. 55 Changan CS55 were used to break Guinness World Records of Largest parade of autonomous cars.

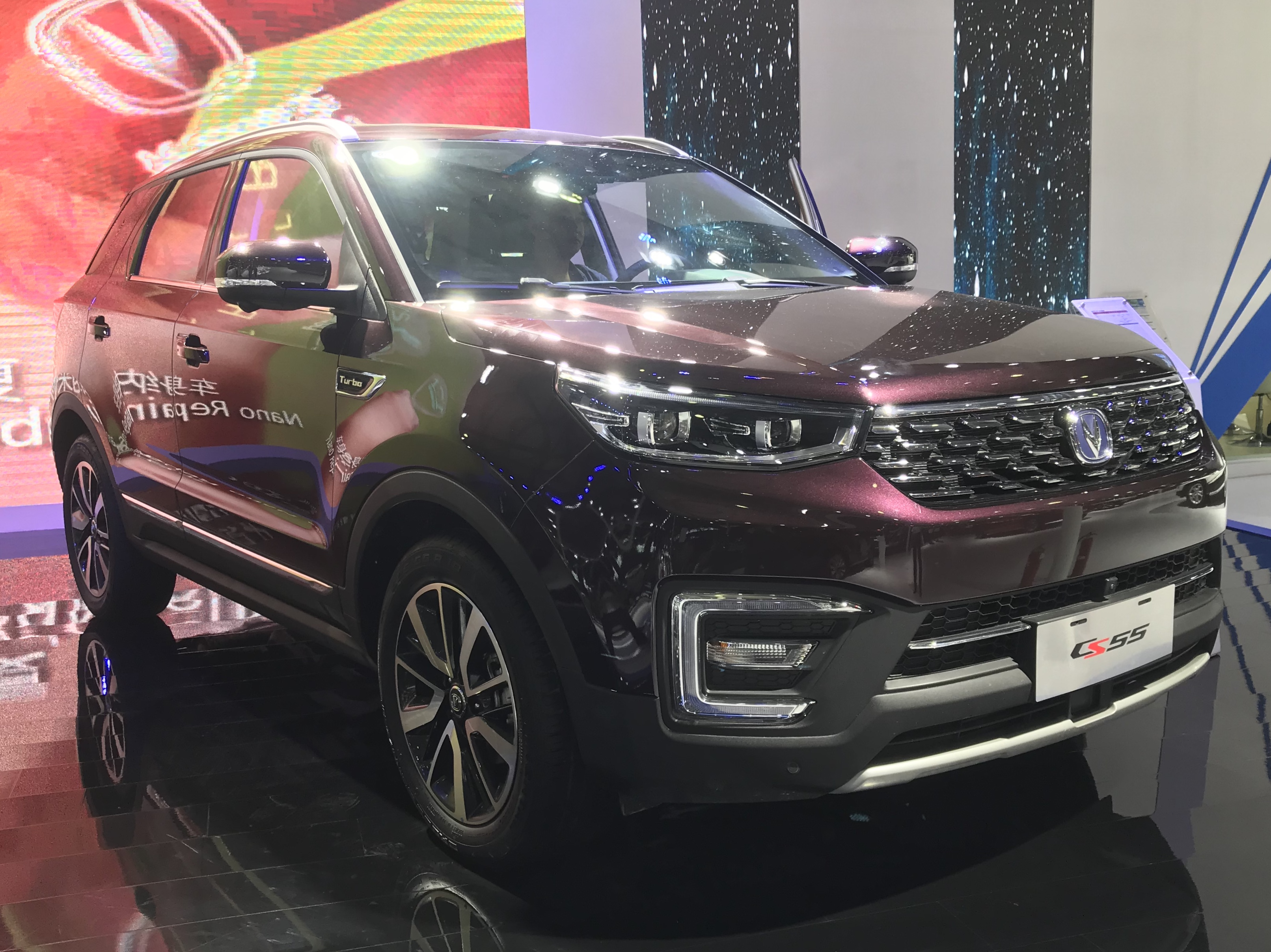
Changan CS55 facelift front during the 2018 Pudong Auto Show.

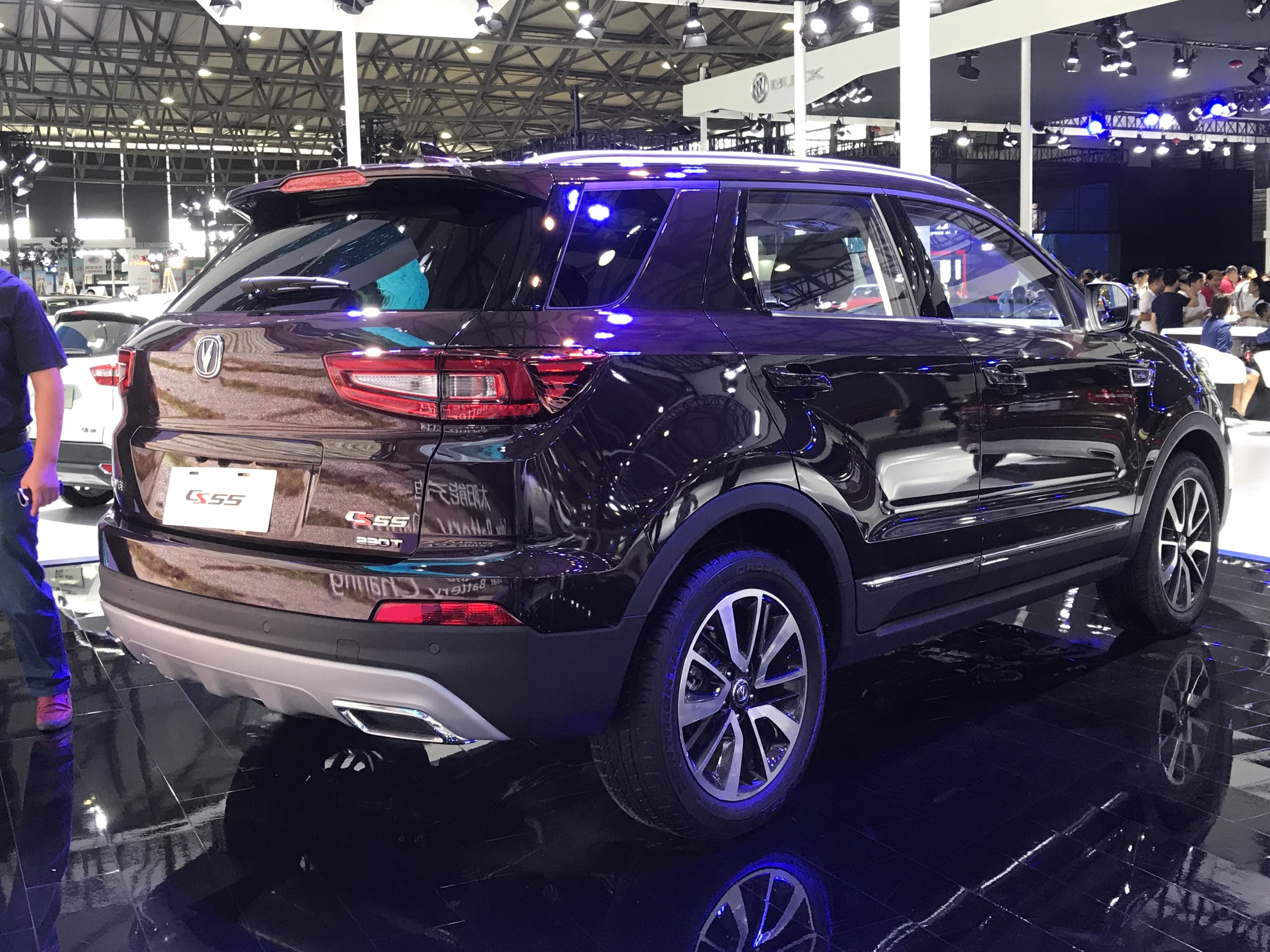
Changan CS55 facelift rear during the 2018 Pudong Auto Show

=== Changan CS55 Plus ===
Another facelift was launched in 2019 dubbed the Changan CS55 Plus, featuring completely restyled front and rear designs including a restyled front grille similar to the Changan CS75 Plus and connected tail lamps. The CS55 Plus is powered by a 1.5 liter turbo inline-4 engine producing 180Ps (132 kW) and 300N.m, mated to a 7-speed DCT.

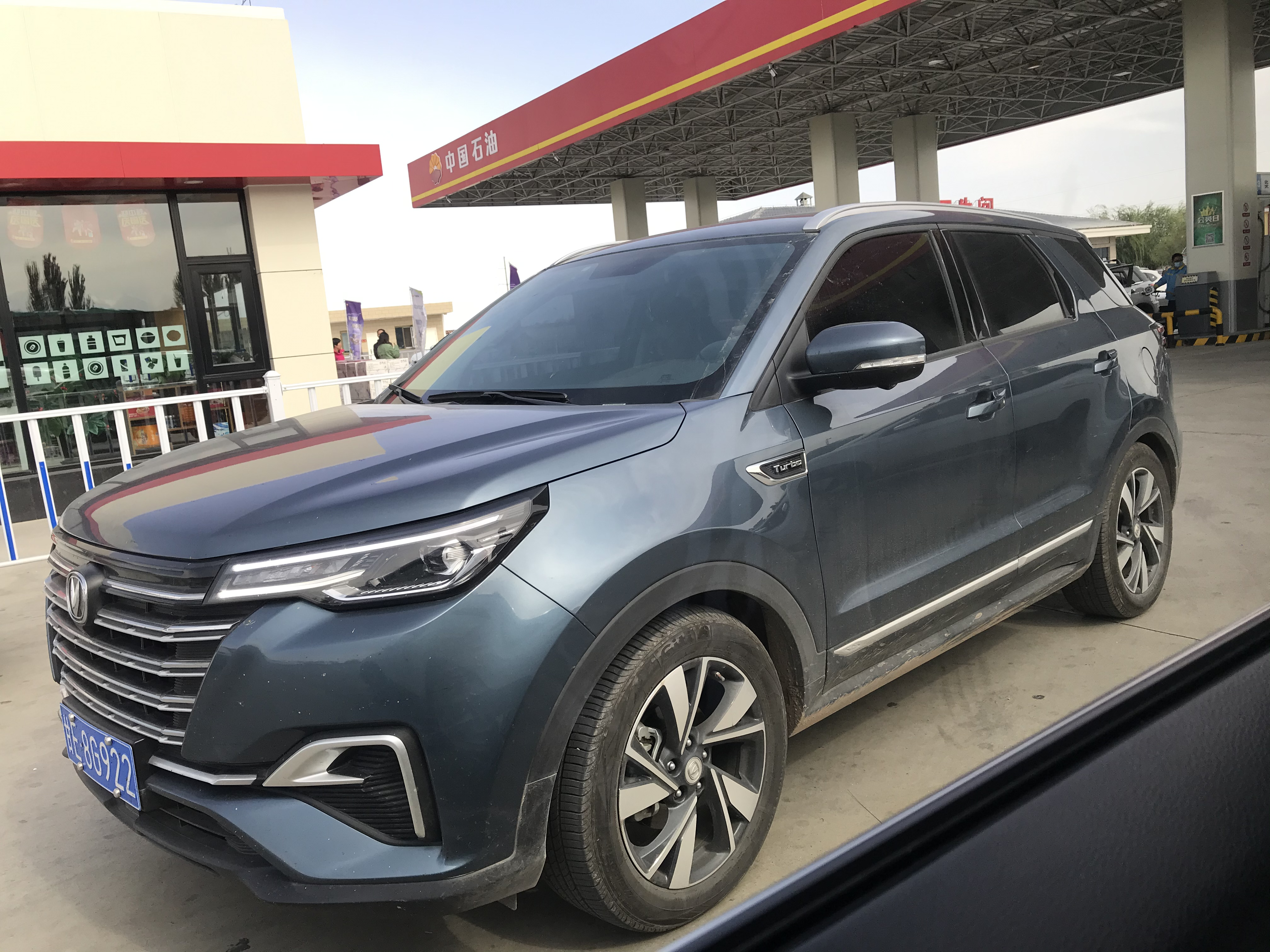
Changan CS55 facelift front

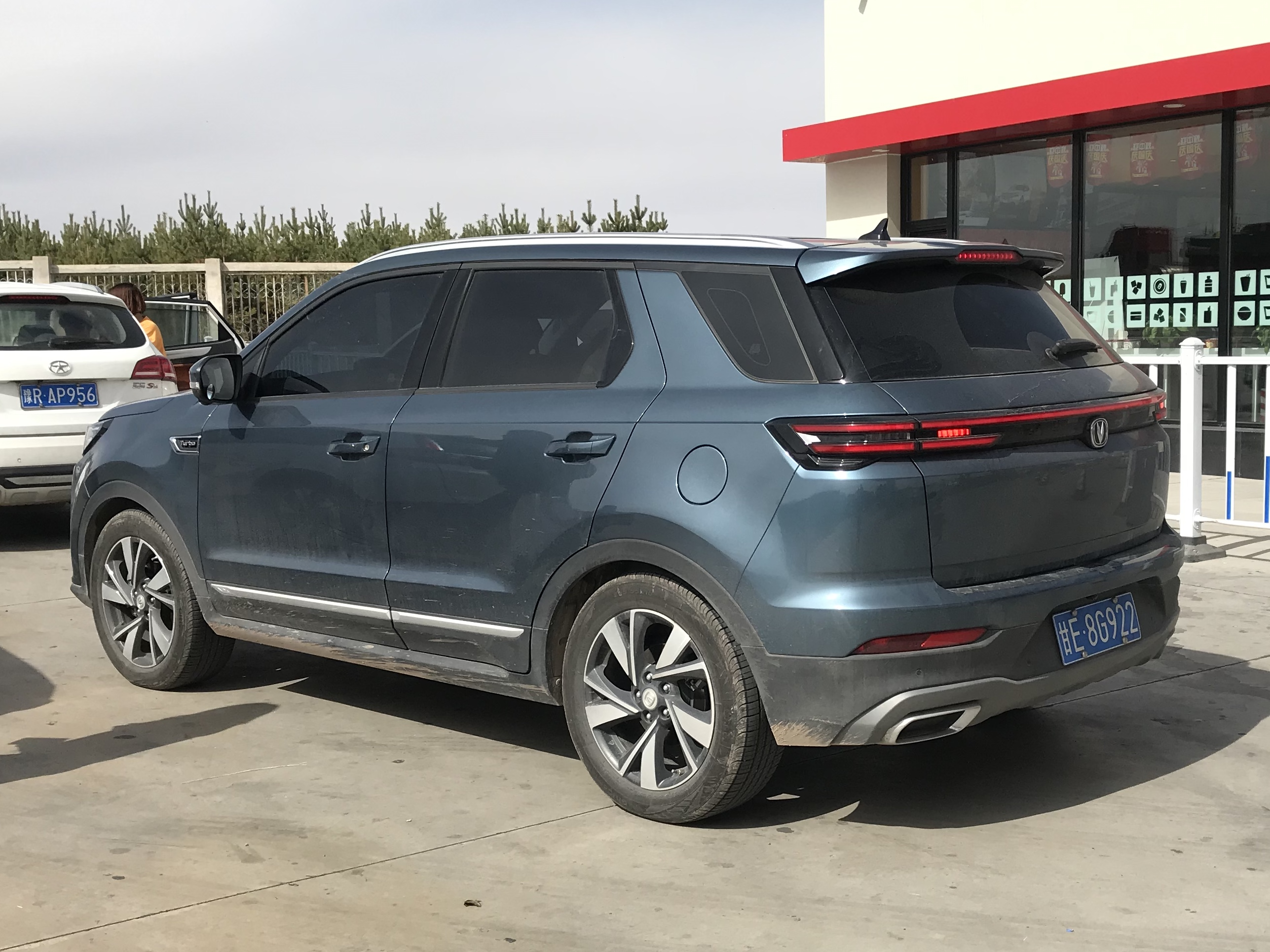
Changan CS55 2019 facelift rear

=== CS55 EV ===
On 15 July 2020, Changan brought a full electric version to market. The model is based on the petrol-powered CS55 Plus and was originally called the CS55 E-Rock before changing to CS55 EV prior to market launch. It has an output of 160 kW and a torque of 300 Nm. In terms of battery capacity, there is a choice between a version with 52.7 kWh and 84.2 kWh, which should enable a range of 403 and 605 km according to NEDC. In fast charging mode, the charging time from 30 to 80% will be 35 minutes.

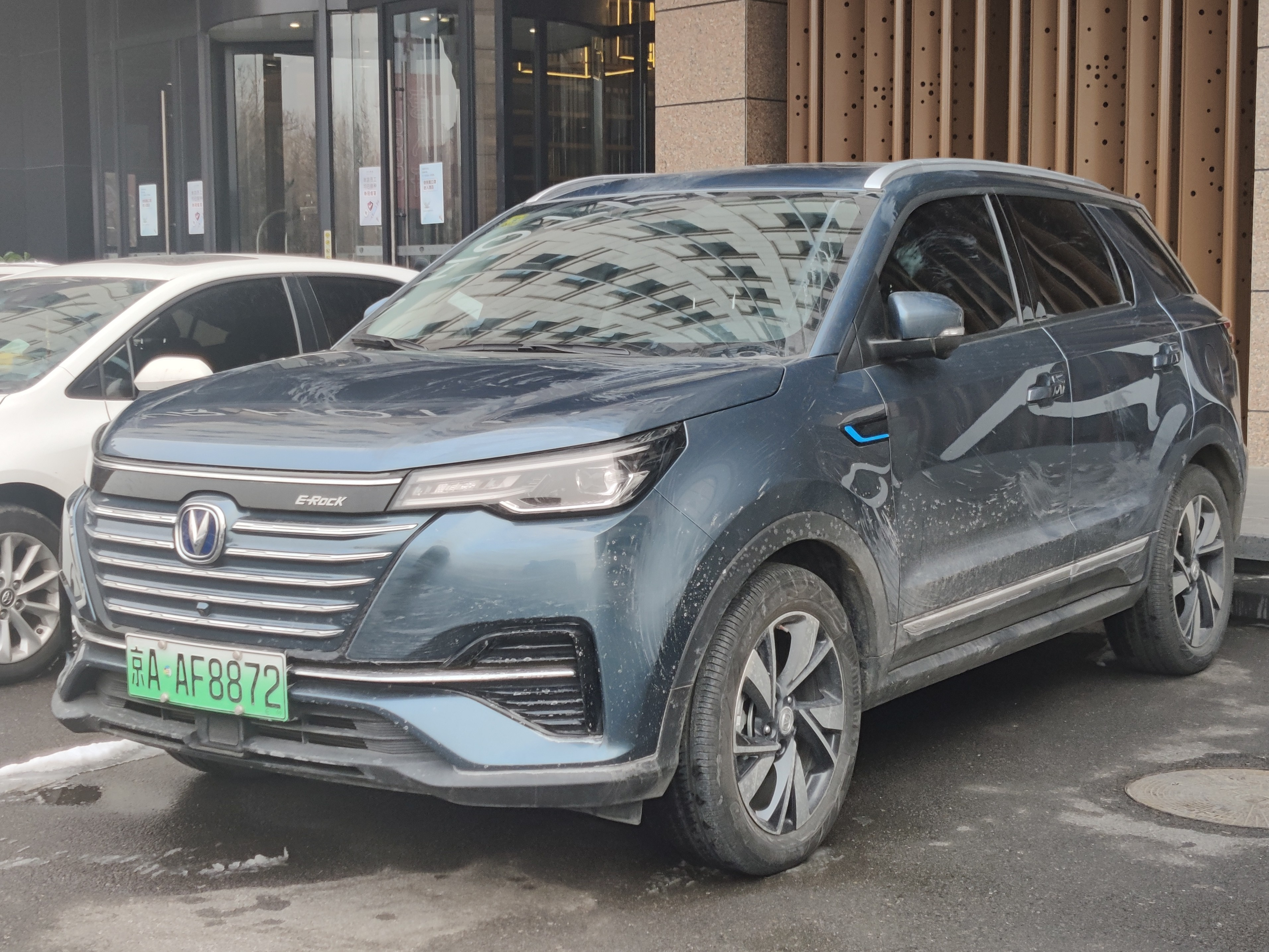
Changan CS55 EV

== Second generation (Changan CS55 Plus Gen.2-Gen.4) ==
Changan CS55 Plus II
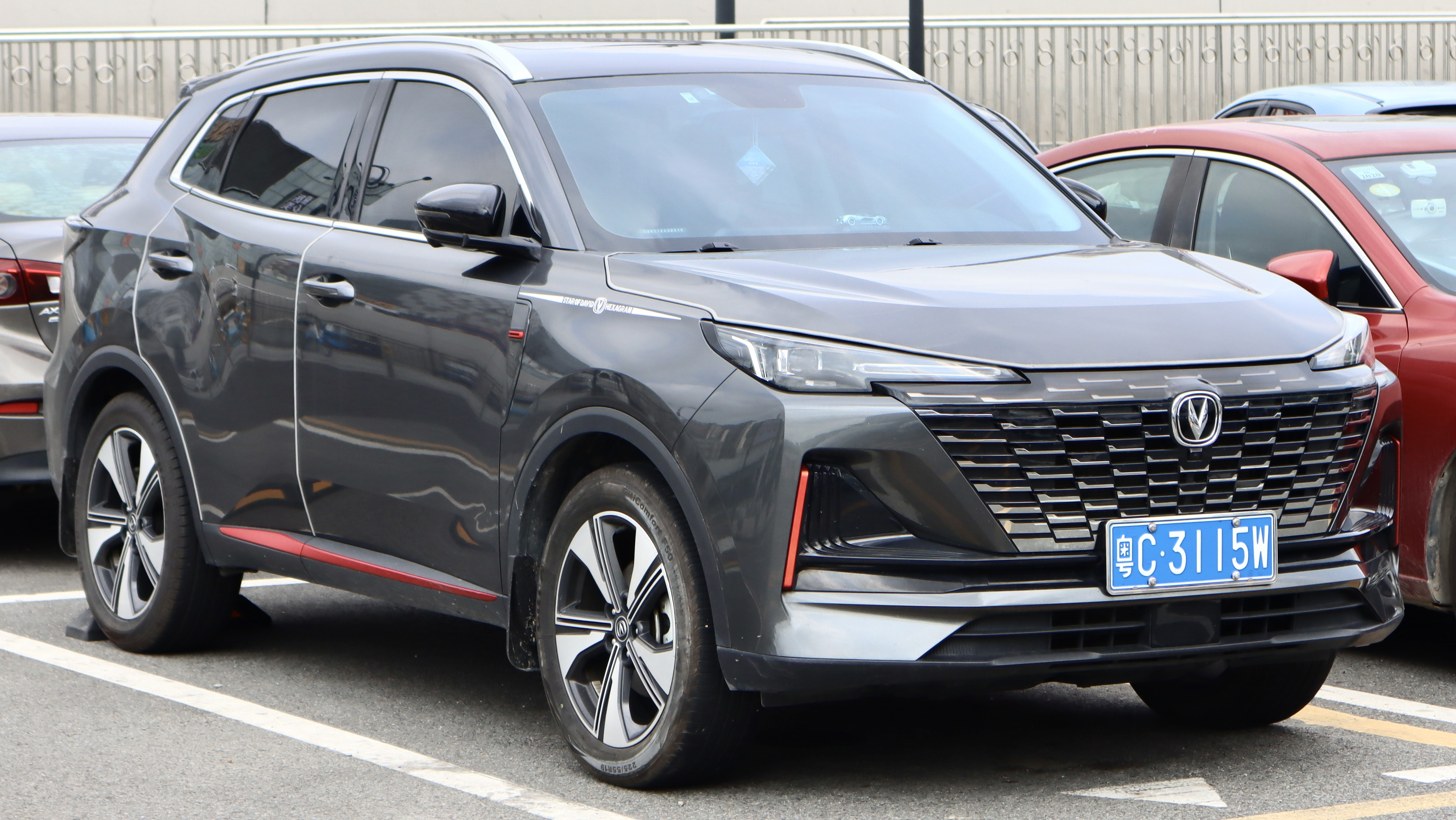

Overview
- Manufacturer: Changan Automobile
- Also called: Changan Nevo Q05 (PHEV); Changan UNI-S (Middle East); Saipa 441P (Iran); DR 6.0 (Spain); DR Stilnovo 6 (Italy)
- Production: 2021–present
- Model years: 2021–present
- Assembly: China: Chongqing; Iran: Kashan (Saipa); Egypt: Cairo (GB Corp)

Body and chassis
- Class: Compact crossover SUV (C)
- Body style: 5-door SUV
- Layout: Front-engine, front-wheel-drive
- Related: Changan Nevo Q05

Powertrain
- Engine: 1.5 L JL473ZQ7 I4 (turbo petrol)
- Transmission: 7-speed DCT; 6-speed Aisin automatic E-CVT (PHEV)

Dimensions
- Wheelbase: 2,656 mm (104.6 in)
- Length: 4,515 mm (177.8 in) (Pre-facelift); 4,539 mm (178.7 in) (2023 facelift); 4,550 mm (179.1 in) (2025 facelift)
- Width: 1,865 mm (73.4 in) (Pre-facelift, 2023 facelift); 1,868 mm (73.5 in) (2025 facelift)
- Height: 1,680 mm (66.1 in) (Pre-facelift, 2023 facelift); 1,675 mm (65.9 in) (2025 facelift)
- Curb weight: 1,460 kg (3,219 lb)

The second generation Changan CS55 Plus surfaced in March 2021, Which is Called Changan UNI-S in the Middle East. And which features exterior design language previously introduced by the Changan UNI-T and Changan UNI-K. It is powered by NE series Changan Blue Whale 1.5 liter turbocharged engine developing 138 kW (188 PS; 185 hp) at 5,500 rpm with 300 N⋅m (221 lbf⋅ft) of torque between 1,600 and 4,100 rpm, the engine is mated to a wet style 7-speed dual-clutch transmission.

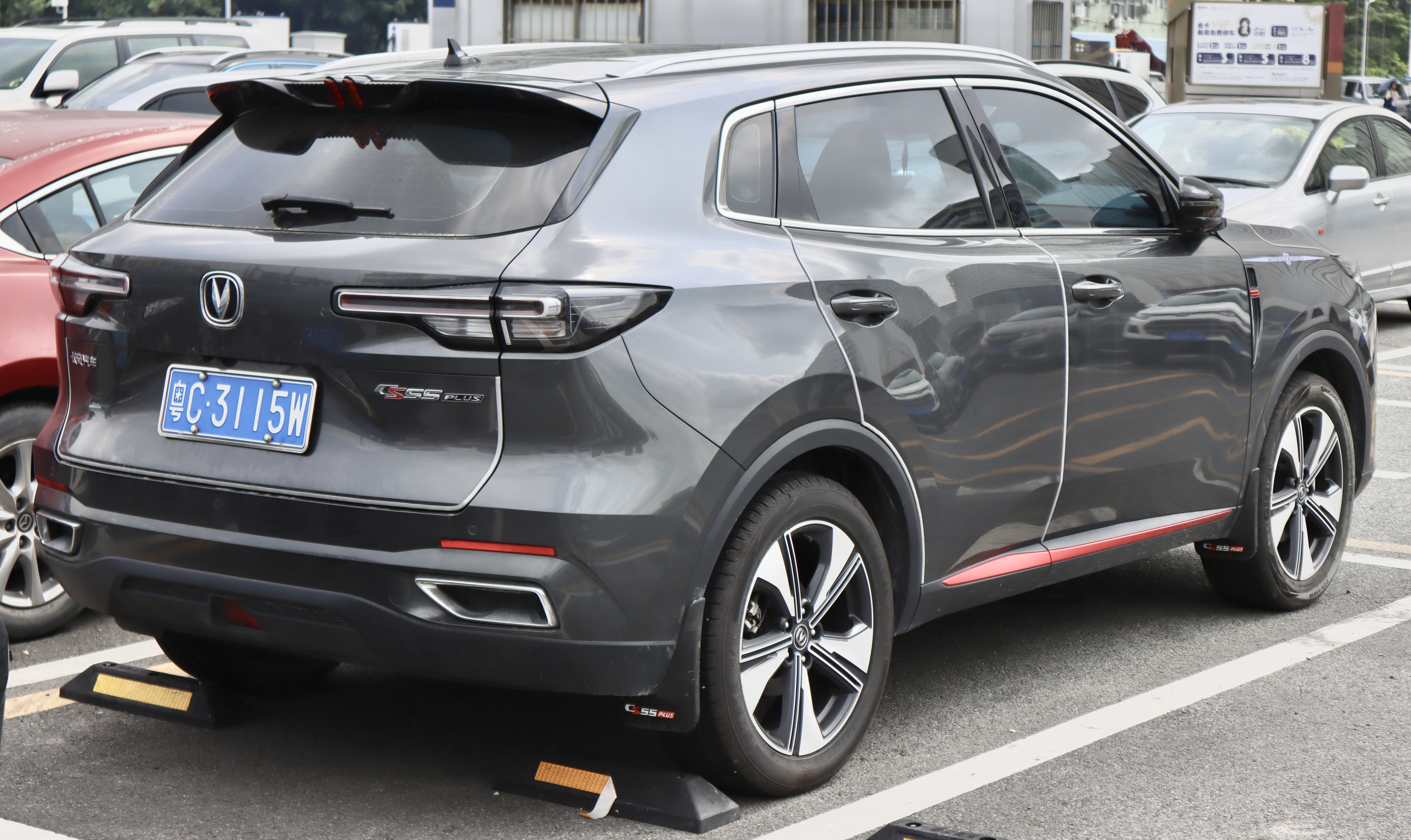
Rear view

=== 2023 facelift (marketed as third generation) ===
A facelift was introduced in April 2023 during Auto Shanghai. Renamed CS55 Plus Third Generation (第三代CS55PLUS 新蓝鲸), the vehicle was launched on the Chinese market in September 2023. It features a redesigned front bumper with a body-colored grille and new headlights with a distinctive light signature. Its dimensions are 4539 mm in length, 1865 mm in width, and 1680 mm in height, with a wheelbase of 2656 mm. The updated model features the new 500 bar high pressure fuel injection 1.5 liter turbo “Blue Whale” engine developing 141 kW and 310 N·m mated to the new 7-speed wet style DCT gearbox or a 6-speed Aisin automatic.

In March 2025, the PHEV version (第三代CS55PLUS PHEV) was introduced, equipped with the “Smart New Blue Whale 3.0” plug-in hybrid system. This system includes a dual electric motor architecture (P1+P3), a 1.5-liter turbocharged internal combustion engine, E-CVT transmission and an 18.4 kWh battery. The total combined power output is 230 kW, with a maximum torque of 330 N·m. Acceleration from 0 to 100 km/h takes 7.3 seconds. The manufacturer claims an electric range of 125 km under the CLTC cycle, and a total range (gasoline with a 51-liter tank plus electric) of 1320 km.

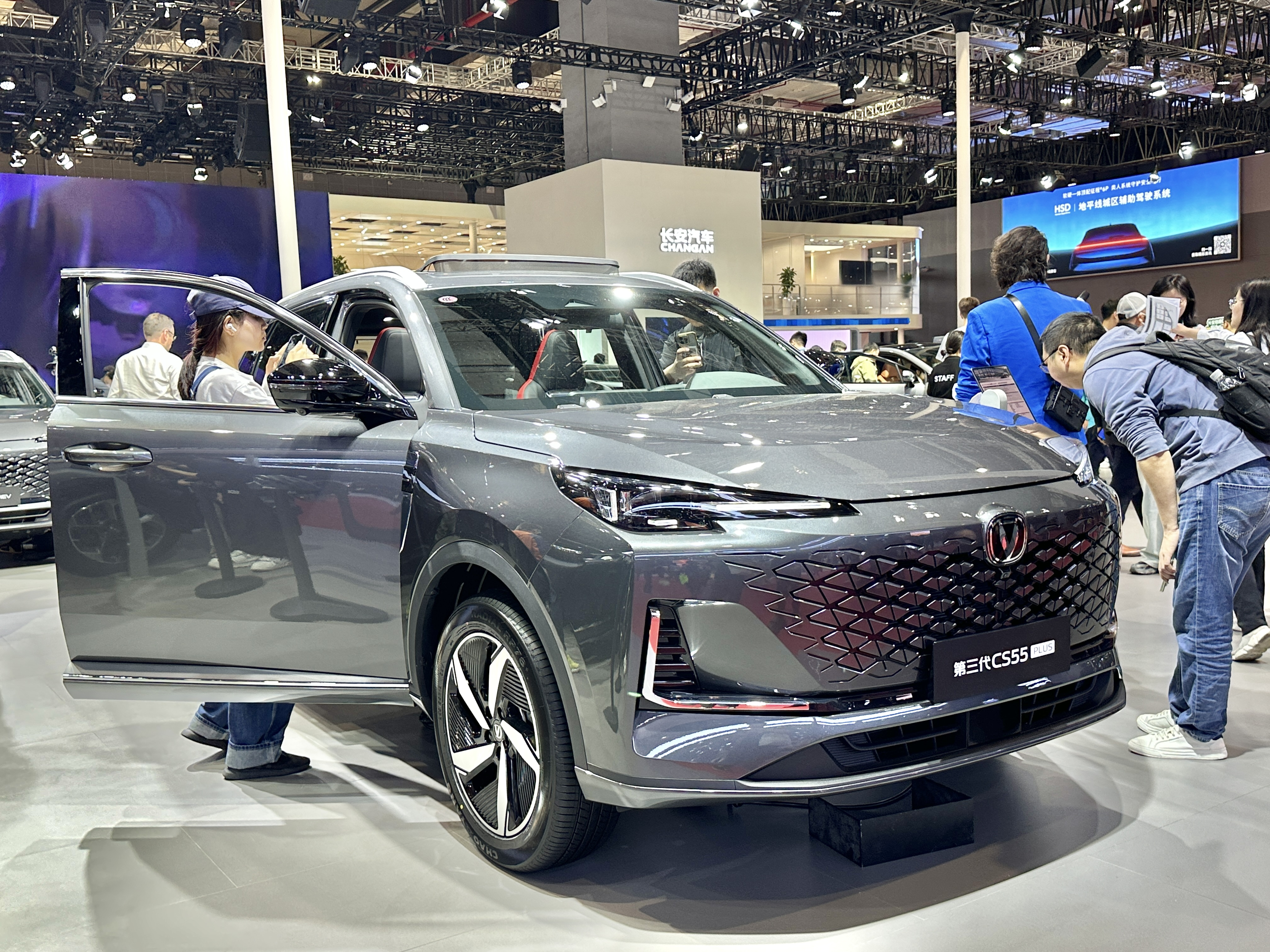
Changan CS55 Plus III (front)

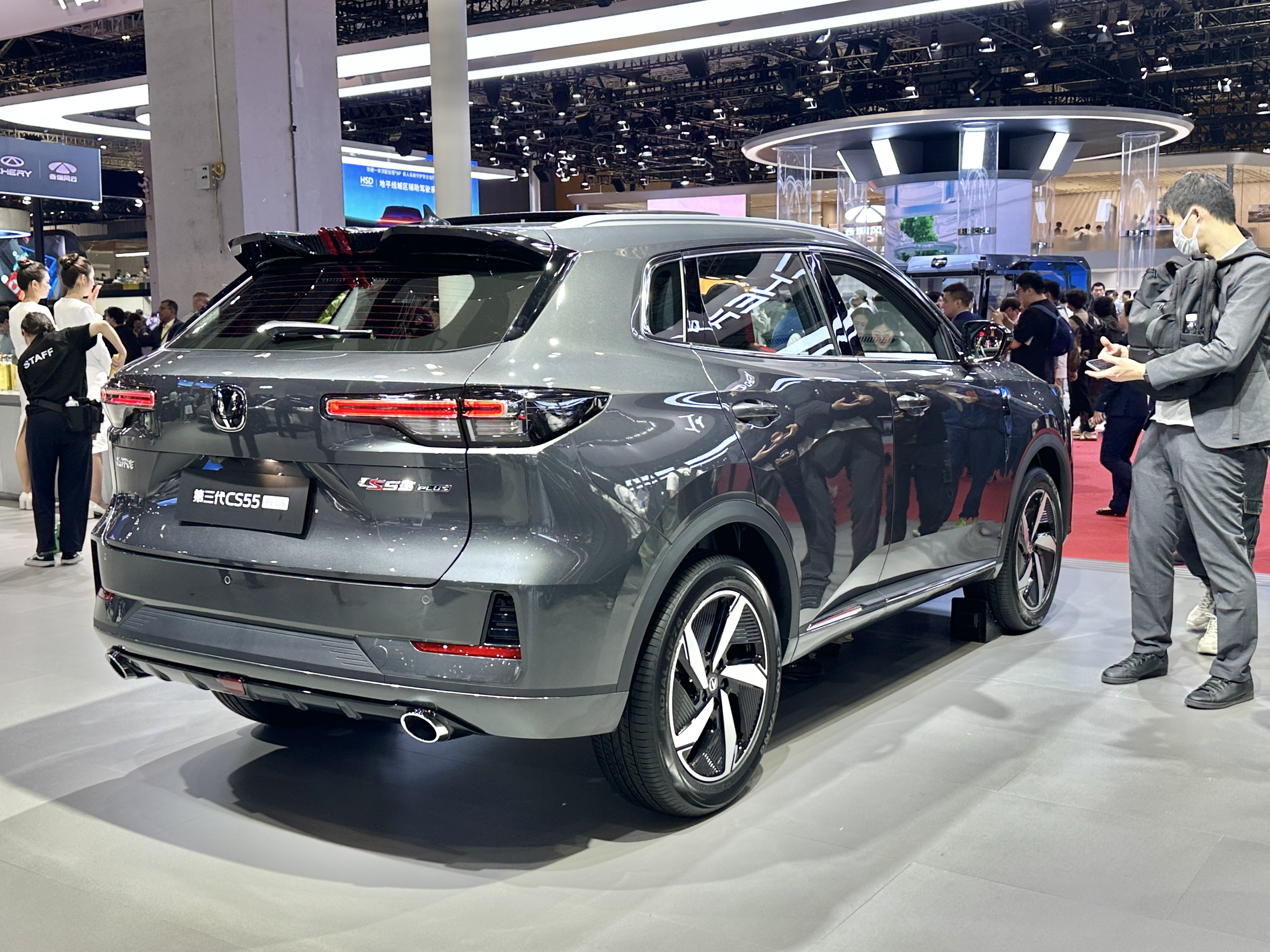
Changan CS55 Plus III (rear)

=== 2025 facelift (marketed as fourth generation) ===
An additional facelift was introduced in August 2025; renamed CS55 Plus Fourth Generation (第四代CS55PLUS), the vehicle features a new front bumper with a sharper grille design and redesigned front and rear headlights. Its dimensions are 4550 mm in length, 1868 mm in width, 1675 mm in height, with a wheelbase of 2656 mm. The engine is a 1.5-liter turbocharged gasoline unit delivering 141 kW and a maximum torque of 310 N⋅m, paired with a seven-speed dual-clutch automatic transmission. The declared fuel consumption is 6.9 liters per 100 km under the WLTC cycle, and the fuel tank capacity is 51 liters. This model complements the previous CS55 Plus versions that remain in production.

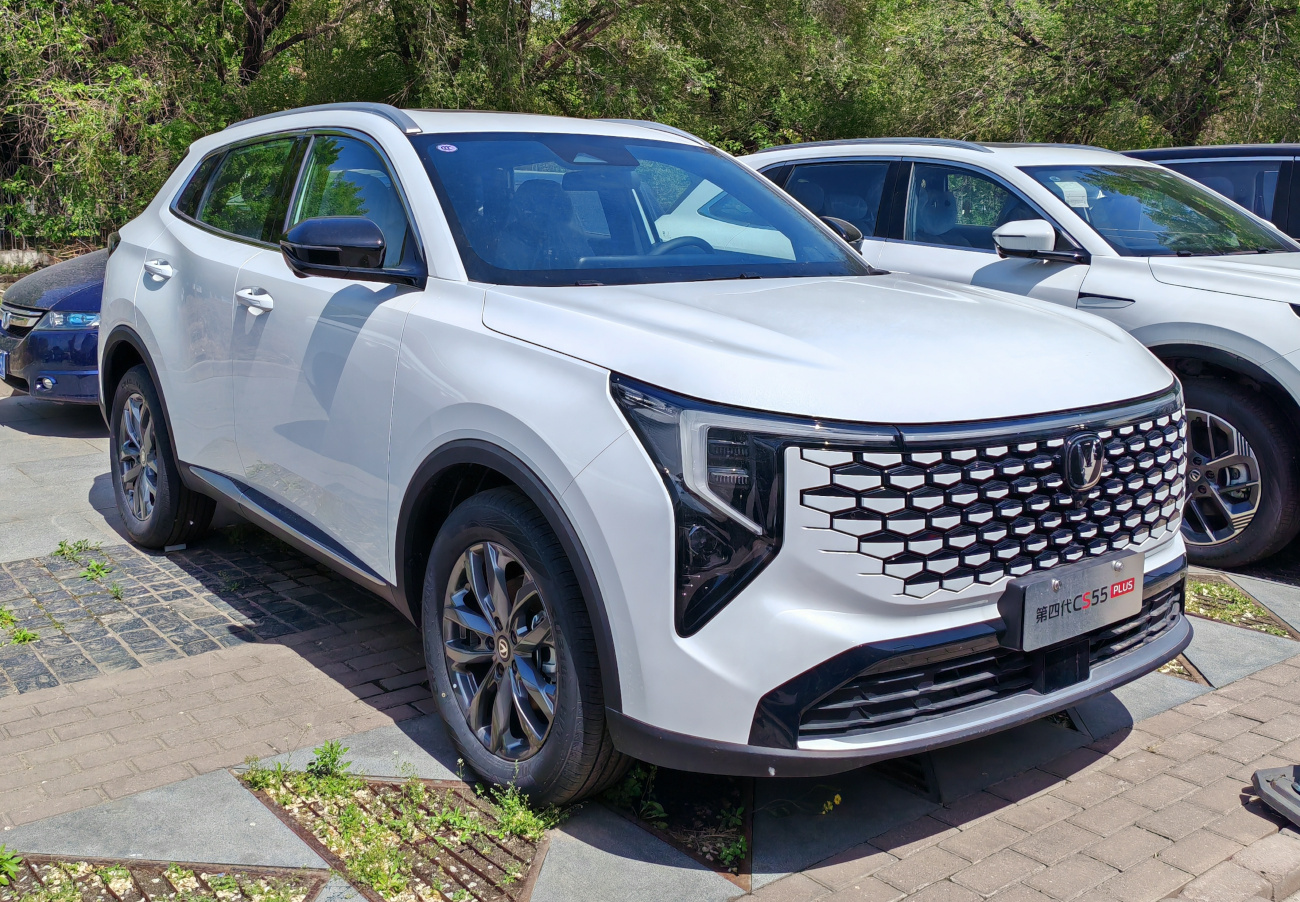
Changan CS55 Plus IV (front)

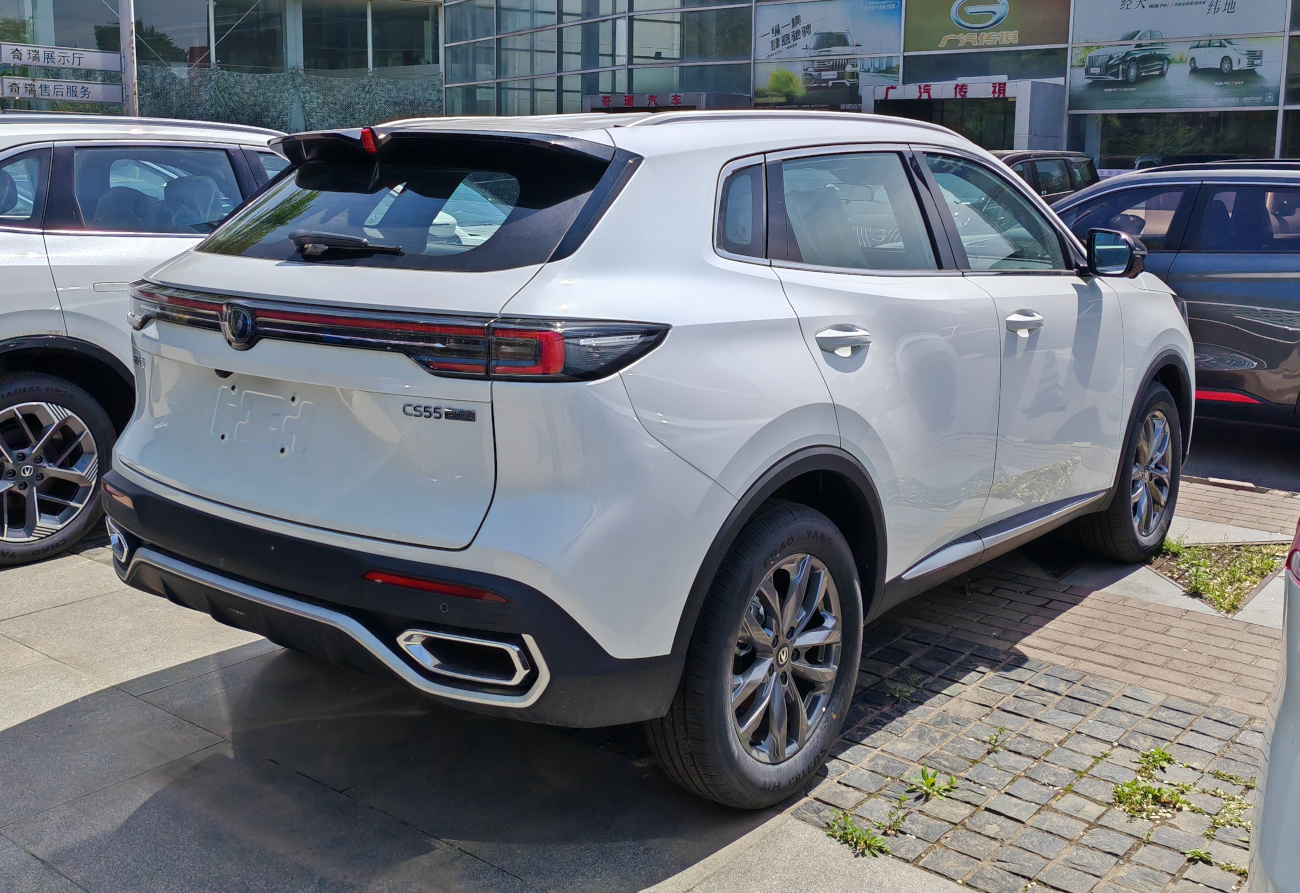
Changan CS55 Plus IV (rear)

=== Changan Nevo Q05 ===
The first generation Changan Nevo Q05 (Chinese: 长安启源Q05) is a range extended hybrid electric crossover SUV based on the second and third generation CS55 Plus. Styling wise, the vehicle is essentially a rebadged second generation CS55 Plus with restyled front and rear bumpers, just like the other Changan Nevo vehicles. The Q05 is powered by a range extended hybrid powertrain with a 1.5-liter naturally aspirated engine codenamed JL473Q5 producing 81 kW and electric motors producing 158 kW.

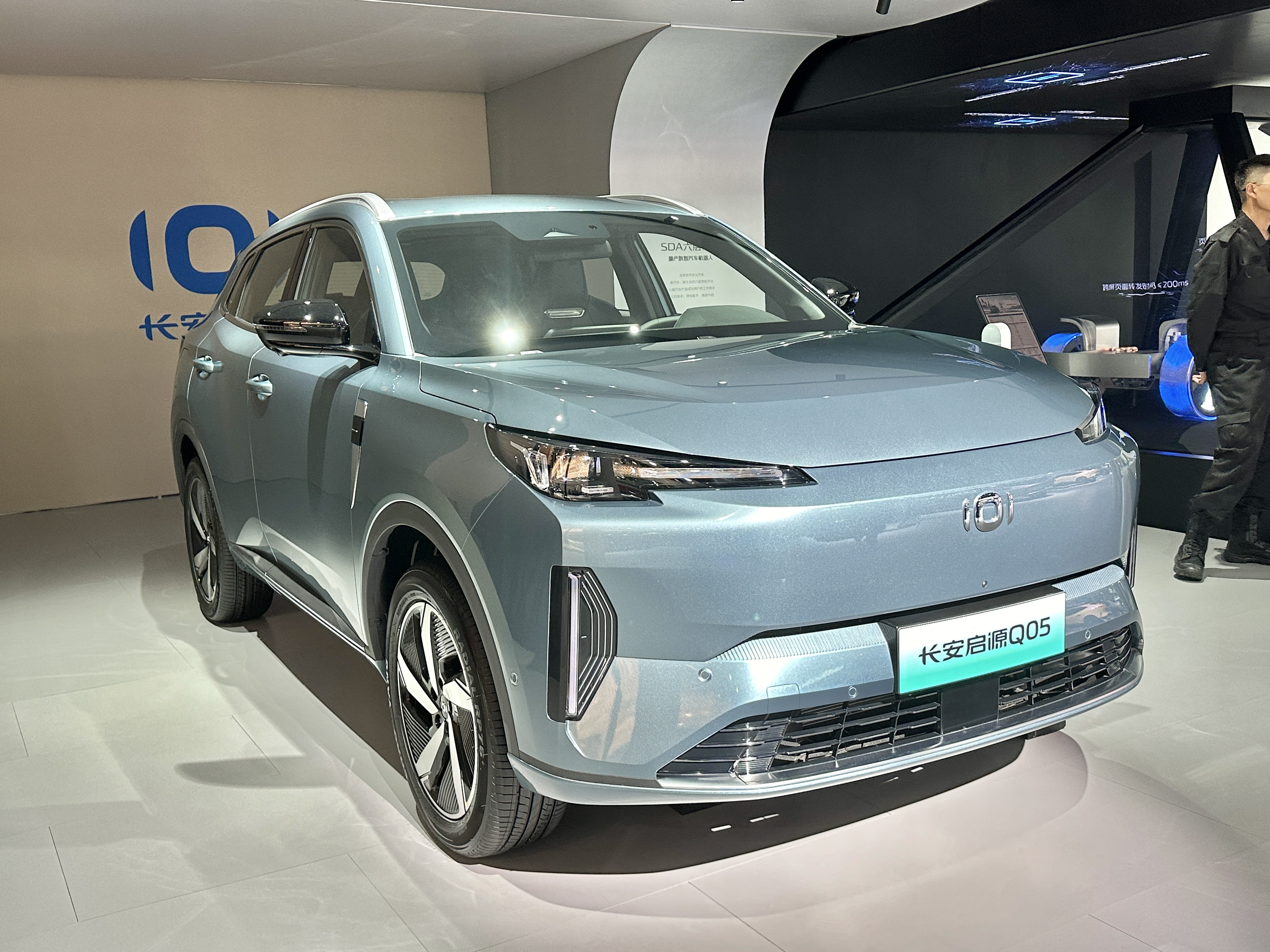
Changan Nevo Q05 (front)

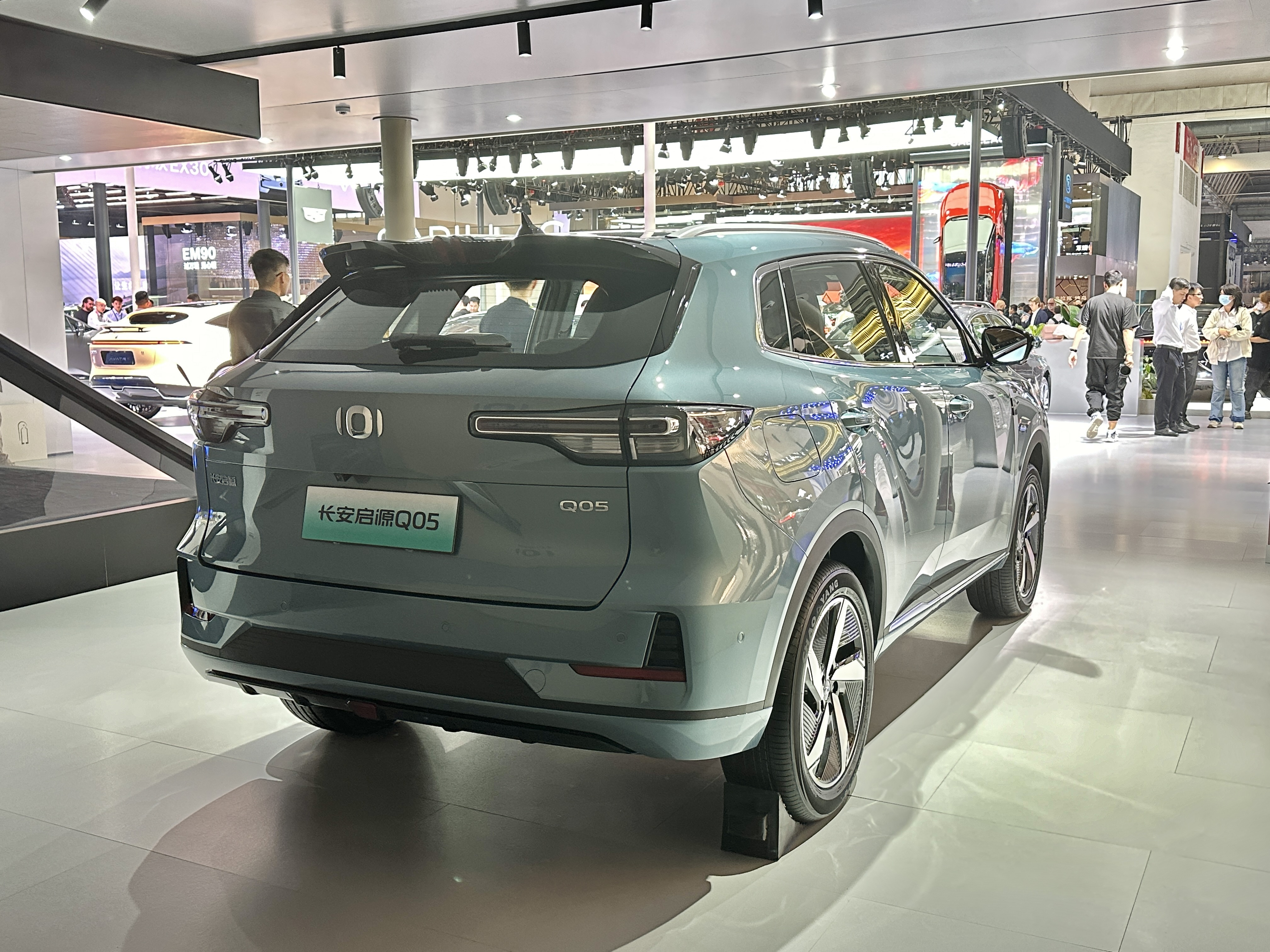
Changan Nevo Q05 (rear)

== Sales ==
Year	China			Mexico		Total production	
Year	CS55 Plus	PHEV	Q05	CS55 Plus	iDD	CS55	Q05 (1st gen.)
2021		—	—	—	—	140,579	—
2022		—	—	1,172	—	152,794	—
2023	96,919	—	1,141	2,207	—	130,386	2,374
2024	53,796	—	38,143	1,232	—	140,198	42,331
2025	38,702	3,438	16,166	2,049	1,085	123,963	40,607
