= Changan Nevo Q05 =

Compact crossover SUV

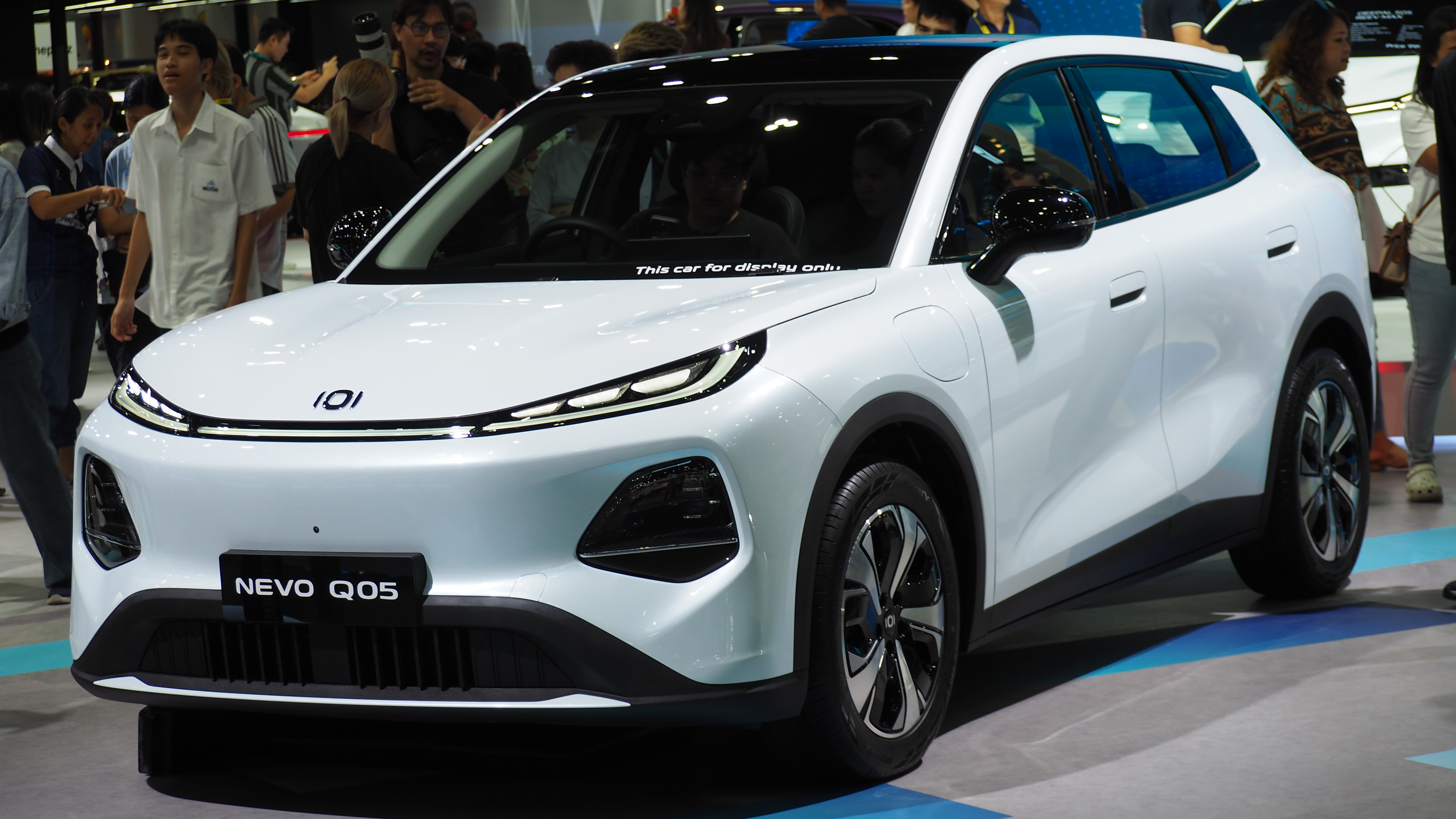

Overview
- Manufacturer: Changan (Nevo)
- Production: 2023–present

Body and chassis
- Class: Compact crossover SUV (C)
- Body style: 5-door SUV

The Changan Nevo Q05 (Chinese: 长安启源Q05; pinyin: Cháng'ān Qǐyuán Q05) is a compact crossover SUV developed by Chinese automotive manufacturer Changan Auto under its Nevo (Qiyuan) sub-brand. The nameplate spans two unrelated generations: the first generation (2023–2026) is a plug-in hybrid based on the second-generation Changan CS55 Plus (2021), while the second generation (2025–present) is an all-new model sold exclusively as a battery electric vehicle, built on a dedicated EV platform revealed in August 2025.

== First generation (2023) ==
First generation
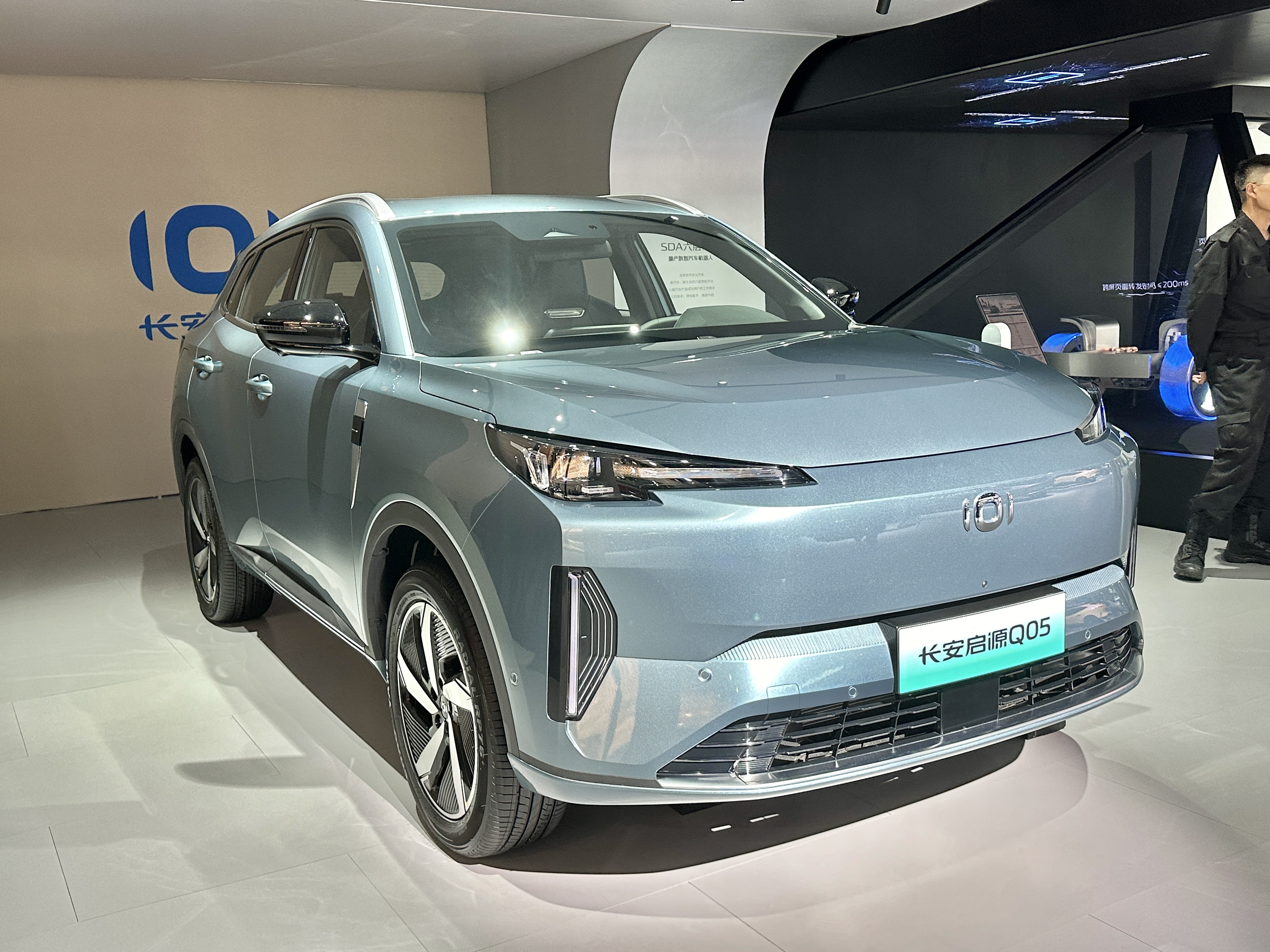

Overview
- Also called: Changan CS55 Plus iDD; Changan CS55 R-EV; Changan Nevo Q05 Classic (China, 2025–2026)
- Production: 2023–2026
- Assembly: China: Chongqing

Body and chassis
- Layout: Front-engine, front-wheel-drive
- Related: Changan CS55 Plus

Powertrain
- Engine: Petrol plug-in hybrid: 1.5 L JL469Q1 I4; 1.5 L JL473Q5 I4
- Electric motor: TZ270XY551 AC permanent magnet synchronous, 158 kW (212 hp; 215 PS)
- Transmission: E-CVT
- Battery: 9.07 kWh LFP EVE Energy (2023); 18.99 kWh LFP EVE Energy (2023–2024); 18.99 kWh LFP CALB (2024); 18.4 kWh LFP CATL (2025)
- Electric range: 125 km (78 mi) (CLTC); 95 km (59 mi) (WLTC)

Dimensions
- Wheelbase: 2,656 mm (104.6 in)
- Length: 4,539 mm (178.7 in)
- Width: 1,865 mm (73.4 in)
- Height: 1,680 mm (66.1 in)
- Curb weight: 1,655–1,680 kg (3,649–3,704 lb)

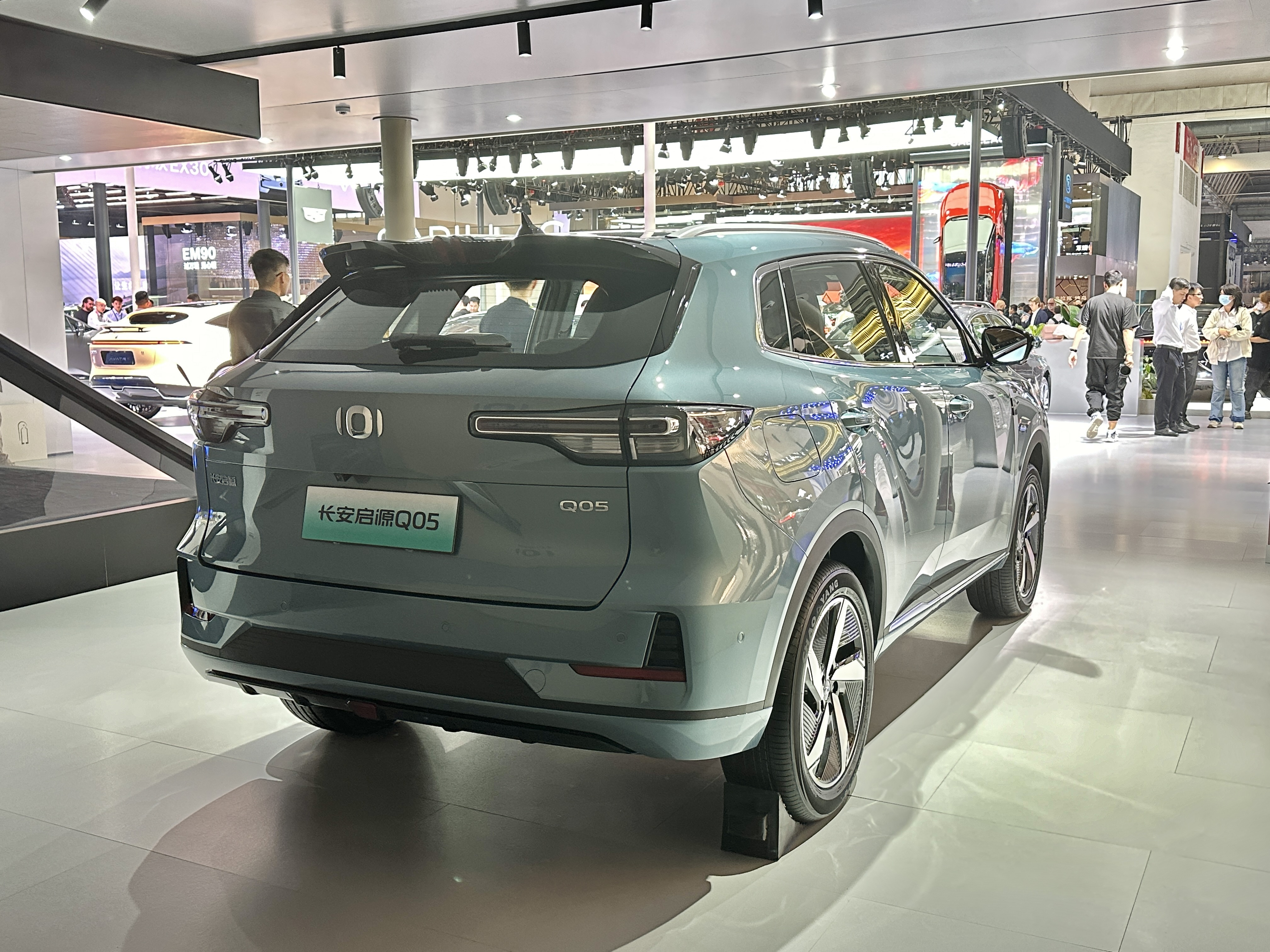
Rear view

The first generation is essentially the second-generation Changan CS55 Plus with restyled front and rear bumpers, like the other Changan Nevo vehicles.

It is a plug-in hybrid, offered with two naturally aspirated 1.5-litre engines depending on trim: a 72 kW (97 hp; 98 PS) JL469Q1 producing 125 N⋅m (92 lb⋅ft), and an 81 kW (109 hp; 110 PS) JL473Q5 producing 143 N⋅m (105 lb⋅ft), each paired with a 158 kW (212 hp; 215 PS) (330 N⋅m (243 lb⋅ft)) electric motor through an E-CVT transmission. It achieves an official 0–100 km/h acceleration time of 7.3 seconds and a top speed of 180 km/h (112 mph), with a WLTC pure-electric range of 95 km (59 mi) and a CLTC pure-electric range of 125 km (78 mi), extending to a combined CLTC range of around 1,215 km (755 mi) on a full battery and tank. WLTC combined fuel consumption is rated at 1.31 to 1.33 L/100 km (216 to 212 mpg_{‑imp}; 180 to 177 mpg_{‑US}) depending on trim. The vehicle uses a 51 L (11 imp gal; 13 US gal) fuel tank and has a cargo volume of 475–1,415 L (17–50 cu ft).

== Second generation (2025) ==
Second generation
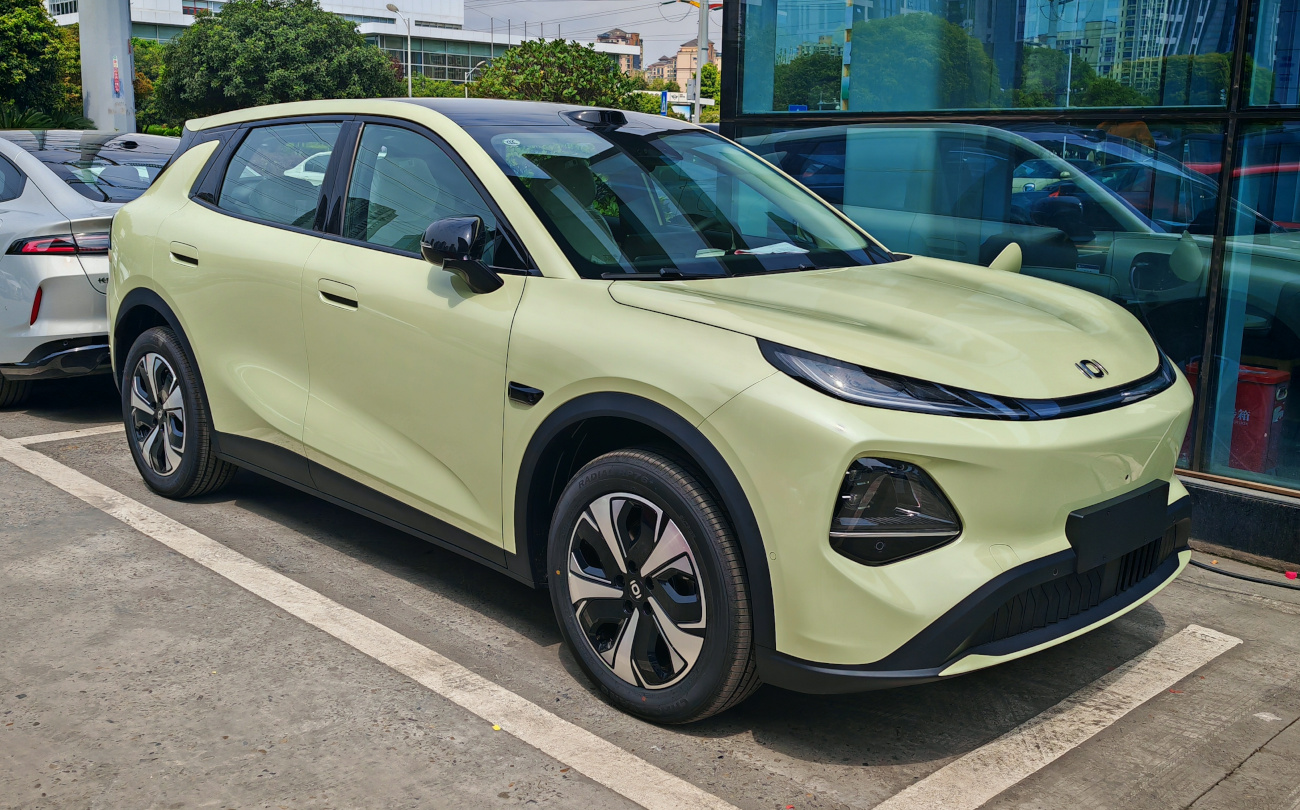

Overview
- Also called: Changan E06 (United Kingdom); Changan UNI-E (Uzbekistan)
- Production: 2025–present
- Assembly: China: Chongqing; Thailand: Rayong; Indonesia: Purwakarta (National Assemblers)
- Designer: Under the lead of Klaus Zyciora

Body and chassis
- Layout: Front-motor, front-wheel-drive

Powertrain
- Electric motor: TZ180XS002 AC permanent magnet synchronous
- Power output: 120 kW (161 hp; 163 PS)
- Battery: 40.3 kWh LFP CATL; 51.9 kWh LFP CATL
- Range: 405–506 km (252–314 mi) (CLTC)

Dimensions
- Wheelbase: 2,735 mm (107.7 in)
- Length: 4,435 mm (174.6 in)
- Width: 1,855 mm (73.0 in)
- Height: 1,600 mm (63.0 in)
- Curb weight: 1,435–1,550 kg (3,164–3,417 lb)

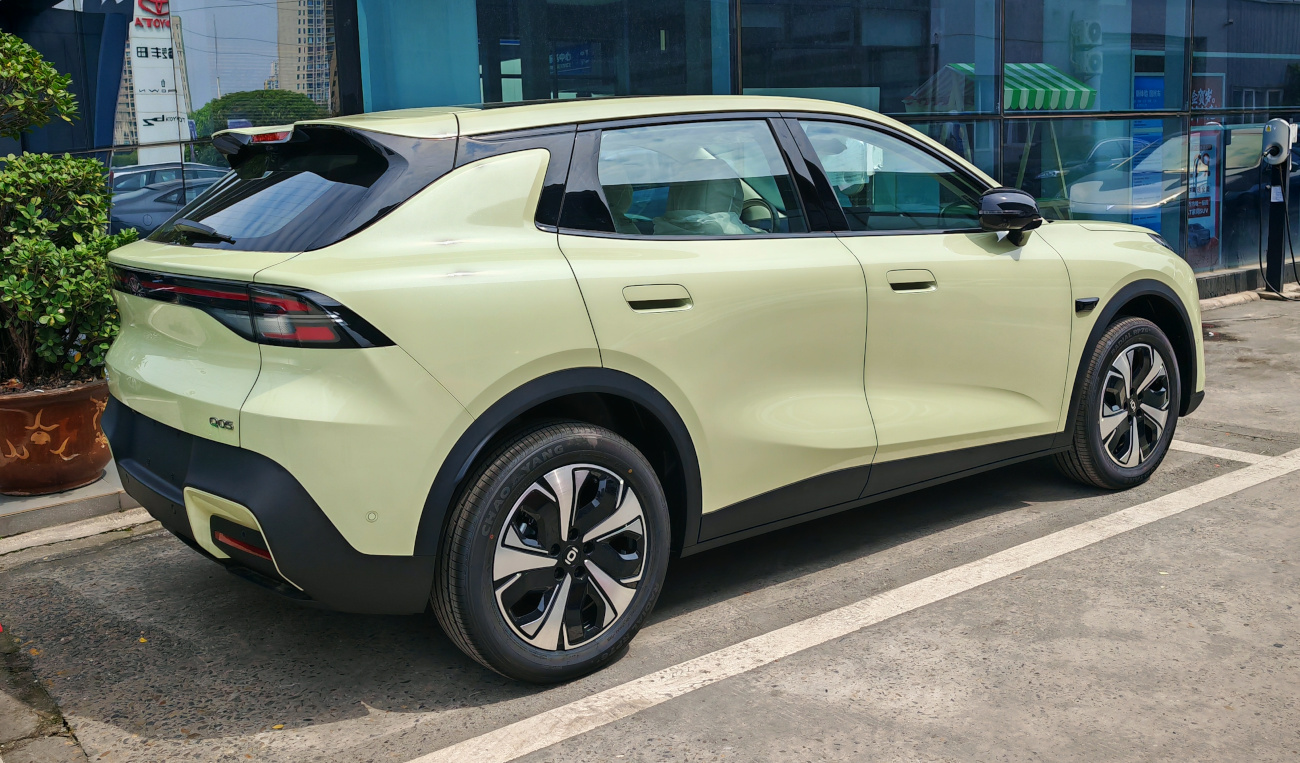
Rear view

In August 2025, the second generation of the Q05, based on Changan Auto's new dedicated electric vehicle platform, was revealed in China's Ministry of Industry and Information Technology product announcement. Unlike the first generation, it is sold exclusively as a battery electric vehicle, with no combustion or plug-in hybrid option. The model is equipped with a 120 kW (161 hp; 163 PS) (190 N⋅m (140 lb⋅ft)) electric motor and a lithium iron phosphate (LFP) battery supplied by CATL. The official launch took place at Auto Guangzhou 2025, using the Nevo brand's Digital Smart Wing 2.0 design language.

The 2026 model year lineup spans seven trims across two battery options: a 40.3 kWh pack rated at 405 km (252 mi) CLTC, and a larger pack rated at 506 km (314 mi) CLTC. Changan has not officially disclosed the exact capacity of the longer-range pack; it is commonly cited as approximately 51.9 kWh based on the range figure. DC fast charging from 30–80% takes around 15 minutes. The range-topping Jiguang Ultra (激光极智) trims add lidar-based Level 2 driver assistance, pairing a Horizon Robotics J6M chip (128 TOPS) with a Hesai lidar unit, and upgrade the standard 14.6-inch 1080p touchscreen to a 15.6-inch 2.5K unit. The 10.17-inch digital instrument cluster is standard across the range. Top speed is 160 km/h (99 mph) across all trims, with a drag coefficient of 0.265 Cd, a turning radius of 5.3 m (17.4 ft), and cargo volume of 540–1,380 L (19–49 cu ft).

=== Markets ===
==== Indonesia ====
The second-generation Q05 was launched in Indonesia on 29 July 2026 at the 33rd Gaikindo Indonesia International Auto Show. Locally assembled in Indonesia, it is available with two variants: Pro and Max, both variants use the 51.9 kWh battery pack.

==== Thailand ====
The second-generation Q05 was launched in Thailand on 28 May 2026. Locally assembled in Thailand, it is available with two variants: Max and Ultra, both variants use the 51.9 kWh battery pack.

==== Uzbekistan ====
The second-generation Q05 was launched in Uzbekistan as the Changan UNI-E on 30 June 2026. It is available with two variants: Comfort (40.3 kWh) and Tech (51.9 kWh).

==== United Kingdom ====
The second generation Q05 will be released as the Changan E06 in United Kingdom in 2027. It will become the smallest car of any Changan brand to be sold in the country when it arrives there.

== Sales ==
Year	China	
Year	1st gen (PHEV)	2nd gen (EV)
2023	1,141	—
2024	38,143	—
2025	16,166	6,540
