= Changan UNI-K =

Chinese mid-size crossover SUV

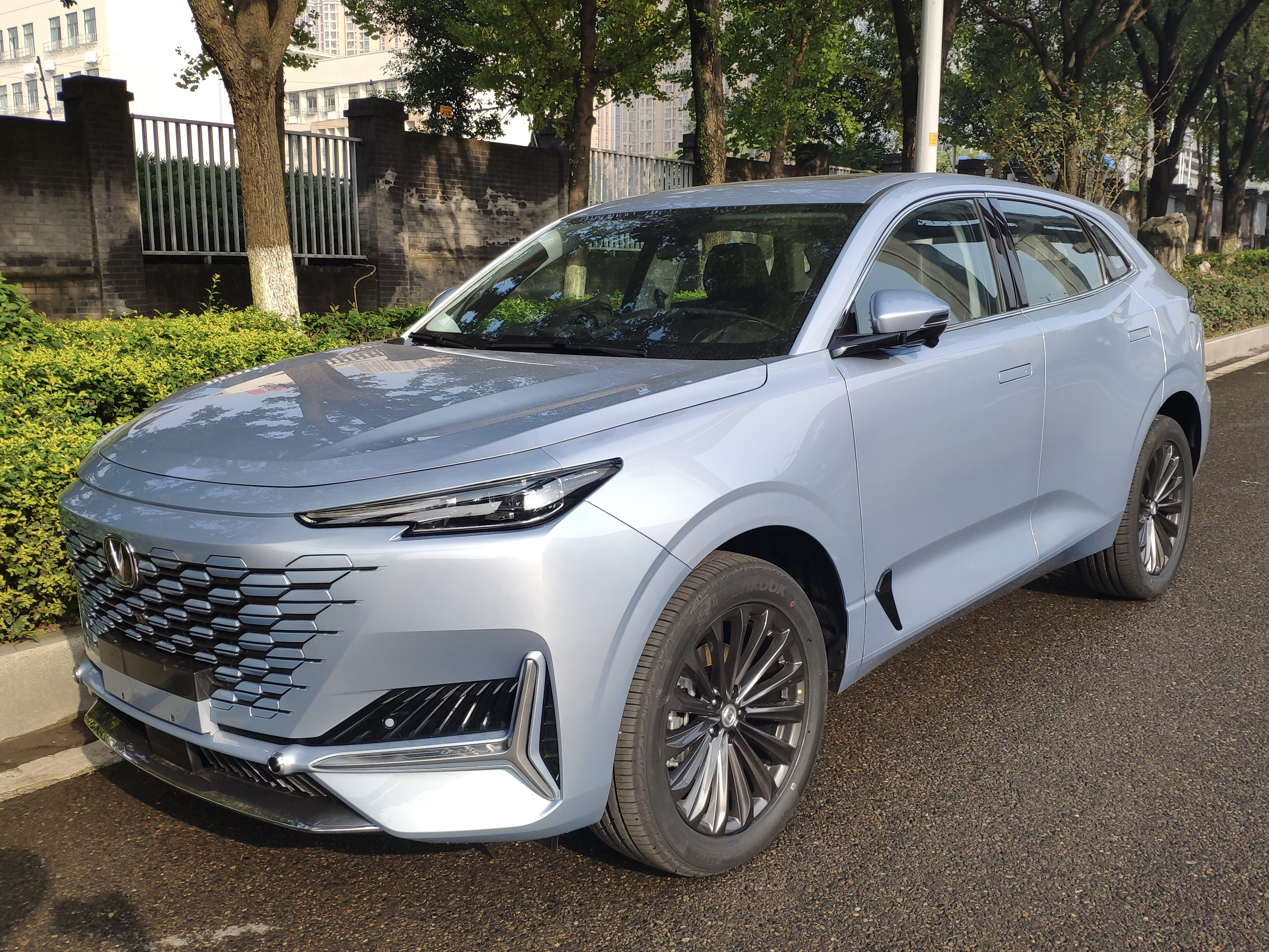

Overview
- Manufacturer: Changan Automobile
- Also called: OSCA MT8 (Italy)
- Production: 2020–present
- Assembly: China

Body and chassis
- Class: Mid-size crossover SUV
- Body style: 5-door SUV
- Layout: Front-engine, front-wheel-drive Front-engine, four-wheel-drive
- Related: Changan UNI-T

Powertrain
- Engine: Petrol: 2.0 L I4 turbo; Petrol/Hybrid: 1.5 L I4 turbo (iDD)
- Transmission: 8-speed automatic 3-speed dual-clutch Blue Whale (iDD)

Dimensions
- Wheelbase: 2,890 mm (113.8 in)
- Length: 4,865 mm (191.5 in)
- Width: 1,948 mm (76.7 in)
- Height: 1,690–1,700 mm (66.5–66.9 in)

The Changan UNI-K (Chinese: 长安UNI-K) is a mid-size crossover SUV made by Changan from 2020.

== Overview ==
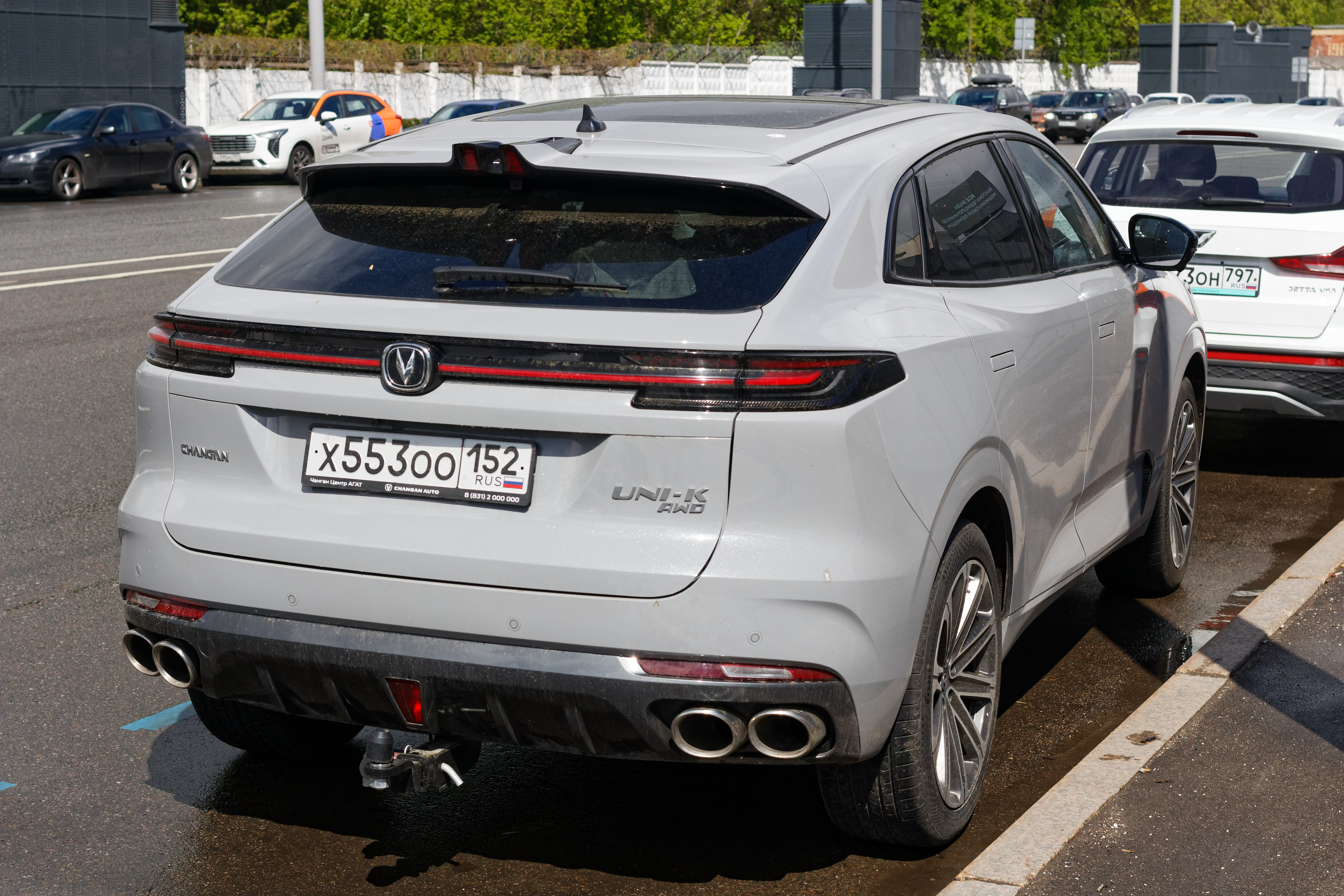
Rear view

The Changan UNI-K is the second product of its freshly unveiled UNI-series, following the UNI-K compact crossover. The UNI-K was first previewed by the Changan Vision-V Concept unveiled at the 2020 Beijing Auto Show in September 2020, and was rumored to be called the UNI-V before the official reveal.

The production version of the fuel version Changan UNI-K was introduced at the 2020 Guangzhou Auto Show.

=== Powertrain ===
The UNI-K has a turbocharged 2.0-liter engine that gives 229 hp (171 kW; 232 PS). It is also equipped with an eight-speed automatic transmission by Aisin and all-wheel drive system.

=== UNI-K iDD ===
The Changan UNI-K iDD is the plug-in hybrid version of the regular UNI-K. Presale started in January 2022. The UNI-K iDD is Changan's first model to be equipped with Changan's Blue Whale iDD hybrid system. The iDD is aimed to contribute to fuel saving and low consumption rather than electromobility and was first teased with the UNI-K iDD crossover prototype at the 2021 Chongqing Auto Show. The Blue Whale iDD hybrid system includes a 1.5-litre turbocharged four-cylinder engine with an electric motor and a Blue Whale three-clutch electric drive gearbox resulting in a maximum horsepower of 170 horsepower with a peak torque of 260N·m plus the maximum electric motor horsepower of 116 horsepower and a peak torque of 330N·m. The NEDC pure electric cruising range of the UNI-K iDD is 130 km, and the comprehensive cruising range is 1100 km. The battery capacity is 30.74kWh and additionally the UNI-K iDD is equipped with a 3.3 kW high-power external discharge function.

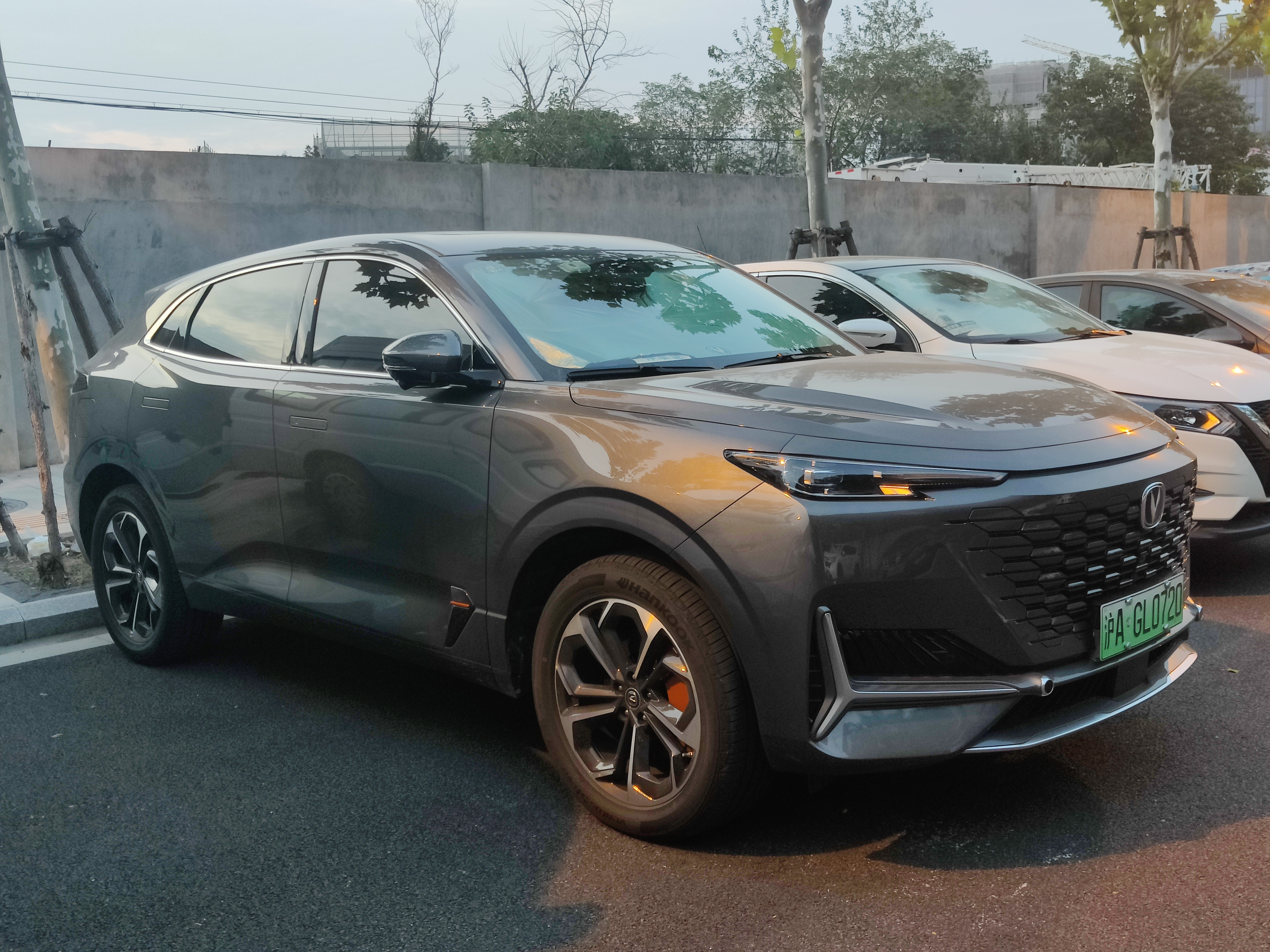
Changan UNI-K iDD front.

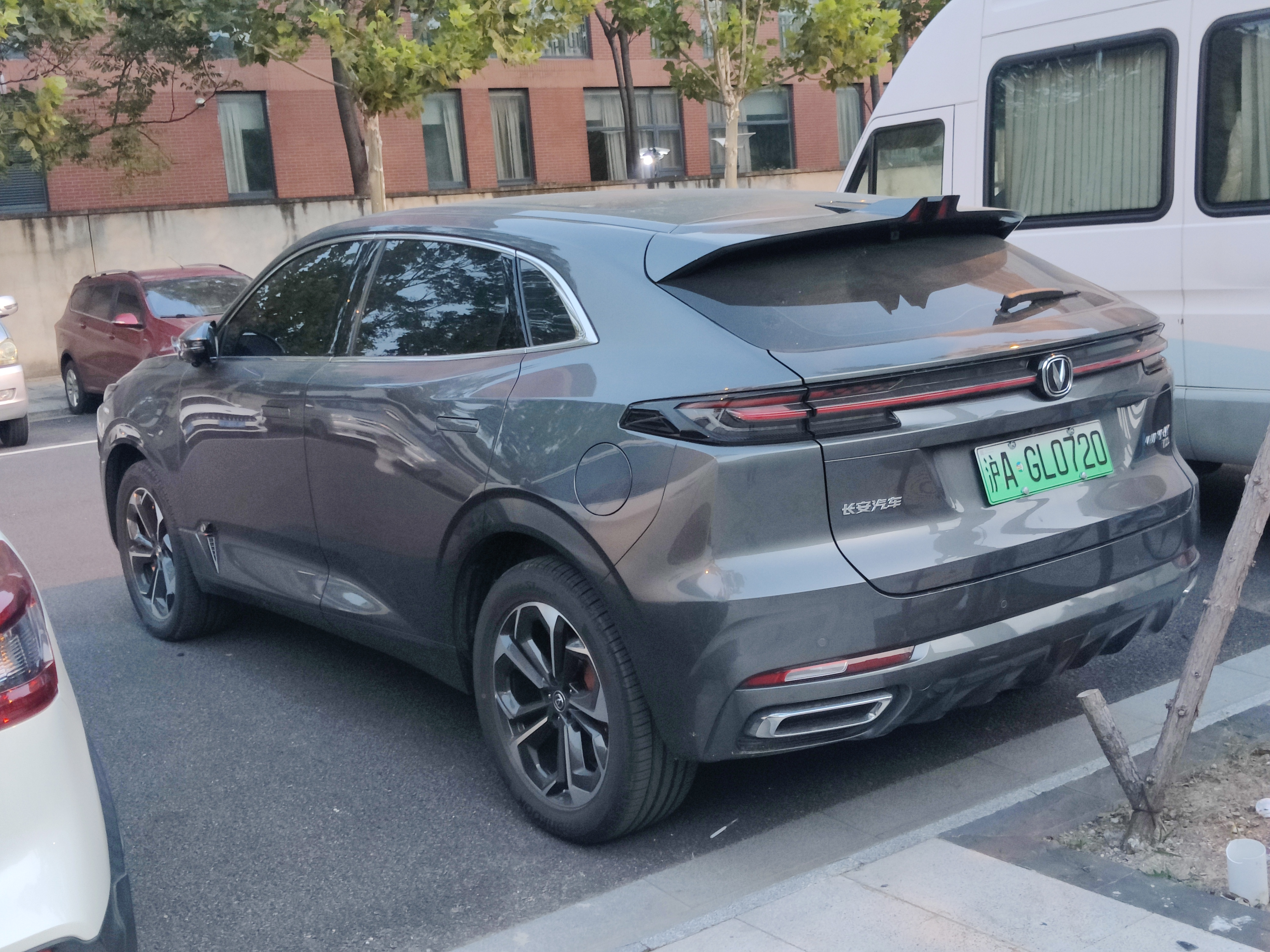
Changan UNI-K iDD rear.

== Markets ==
=== Russia ===
In October 2021, the model was certified in Russia and received vehicle type approval, it was supposed to enter the market in early 2022. In June 2022, the car became available in car dealerships.

== Sales ==
Year	China			Mexico	Total production
Year	UNI-K	iDD	Total	UNI-K	Total production
2021				—	36,503
2022				—	41,160
2023	12,932	7,541	20,473	430	41,129
2024	12,236	982	13,218	1,023	35,392
2025	3,694	252	3,946	712	9,954
