= Changan UNI-T =

Chinese compact crossover SUV

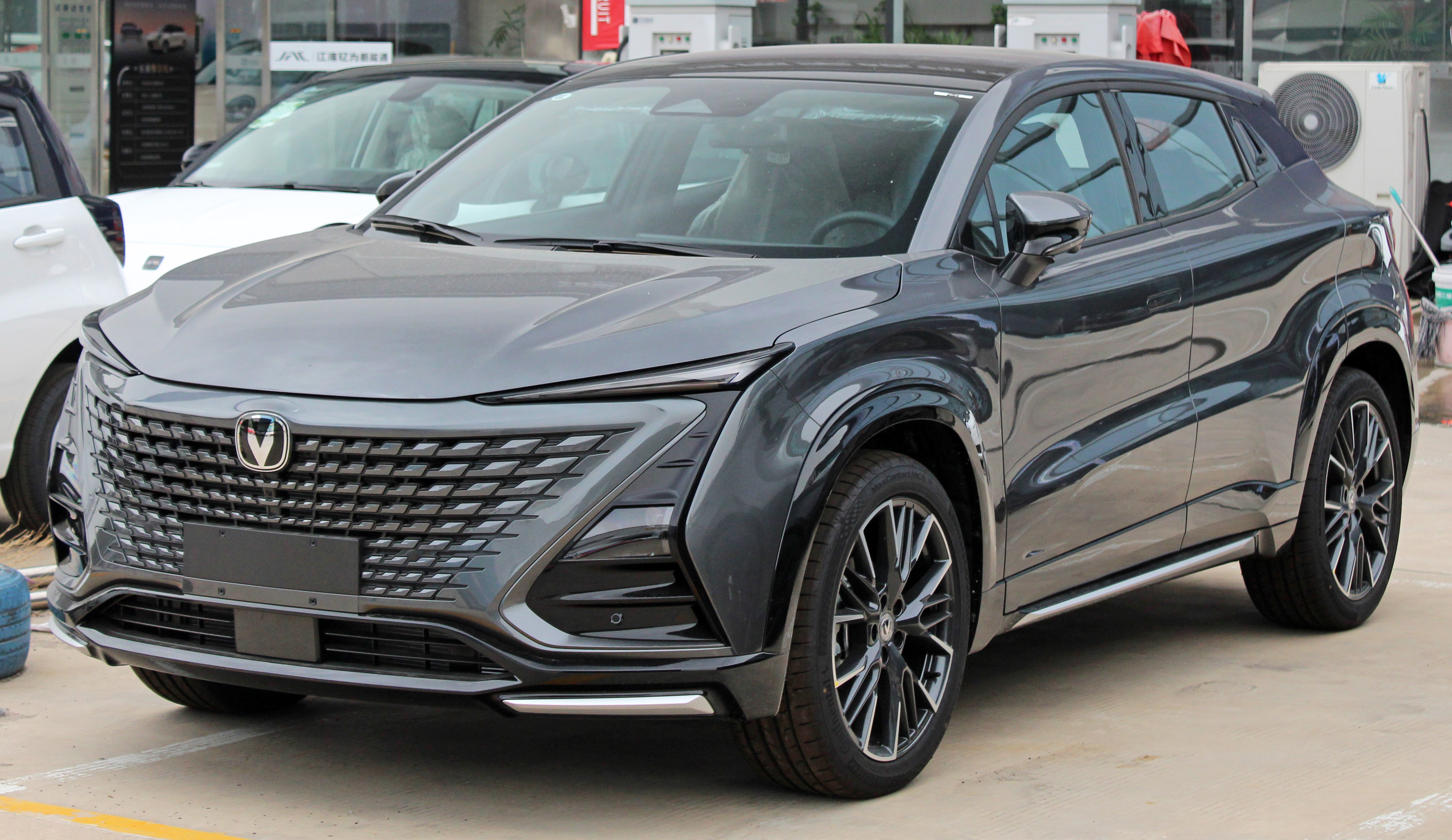

Overview
- Manufacturer: Changan Automobile
- Also called: OSCA MT6 (Italy)
- Production: 2020–present
- Assembly: China; Brazil: Anápolis, Goiás (CAOA Changan)

Body and chassis
- Class: Compact crossover SUV (C)
- Body style: 5-door SUV

Powertrain
- Engine: Petrol: 1.5 L JL473ZQ7 I4 (turbo); 2.0 L JL486ZQ5 I4 (turbo)
- Transmission: 7-speed Aisin DCT; 8-speed automatic

Dimensions
- Wheelbase: 2,710 mm (106.7 in)
- Length: 4,515 mm (177.8 in)
- Width: 1,870 mm (73.6 in)
- Height: 1,565 mm (61.6 in)
- Curb weight: 1,465 kg (3,230 lb)

The Changan UNI-T is a compact crossover SUV produced by Changan Automobile.

== Overview ==
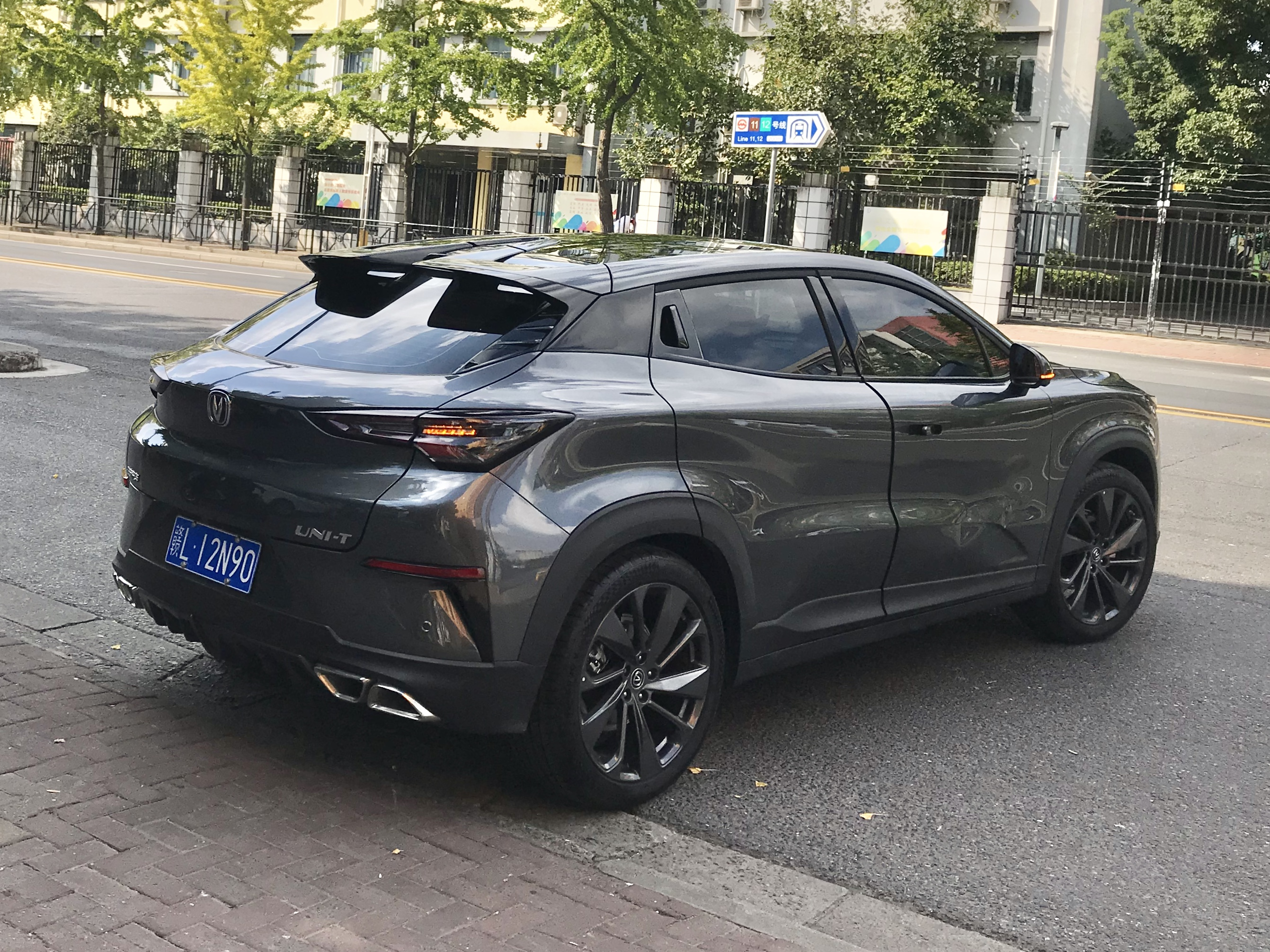
Changan UNI-T rear

Changan showed a first glimpse of the UNI-T at the Shanghai Auto Show in April 2017 with the concept vehicle Yuyue Concept.

The production model was intended to be presented at the Geneva Motor Show in March 2020. However, the show was canceled on 28 February 2020 due to the ongoing COVID-19 pandemic, leading to Changan presenting the UNI-T in China at the end of March 2020. The model came on the Chinese market in June 2020.

The Changan UNI-T received a five star safety certification in the safety crash test result of the domestic C-NCAP published by CATARC (China Automotive Technology and Research Center) on 15 September 2021. In February 2023, the model was restyled. In the summer of 2023, deliveries of cars in Russia began. The competitors of this model are Mazda CX-5, Kia Sportage, Hyundai Tucson and Volkswagen Tiguan. In terms of dimensions, this model is similar to Changan CS55 Plus.

=== Powertrain ===
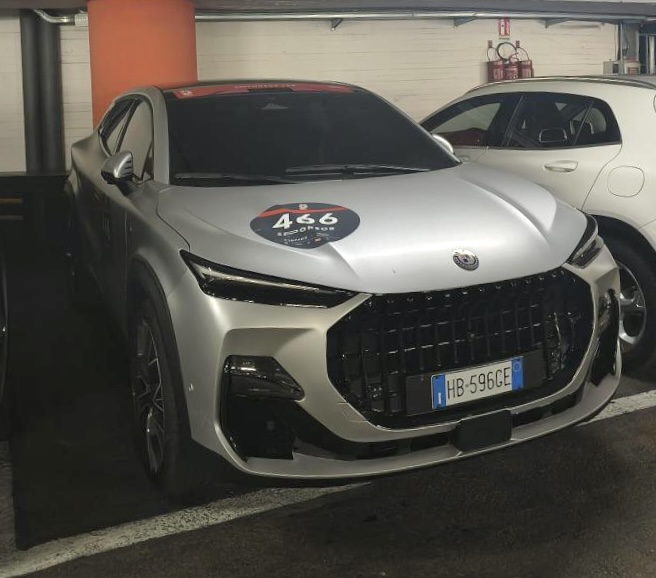
Osca MT6, rebadged UNI-T by DR Automobiles for Italian market

The UNI-T is powered by a turbocharged 1.5-litre petrol engine which outputs 132 kW (177 hp; 179 PS) at 5,500 rpm with 300 N⋅m (221 lbf⋅ft) of torque between 1,600 and 4,100 rpm. The engine is mated with a 7-speed dual clutch automatic transmission.

The maximum speed of the car is limited to 204 km/h (127 mph), but this limit can be removed by chip tuning. The price of the car in Russia ranges from 2 869 900 to 2 969 900 rubles.

== Sales ==
Year	China	Total production
2021		83,610
2022		59,104
2023	28,721	37,352
2024	6,961	17,375
2025	1,107	7,441
