= Changan Nevo Q06 =

Mid-size crossover SUV

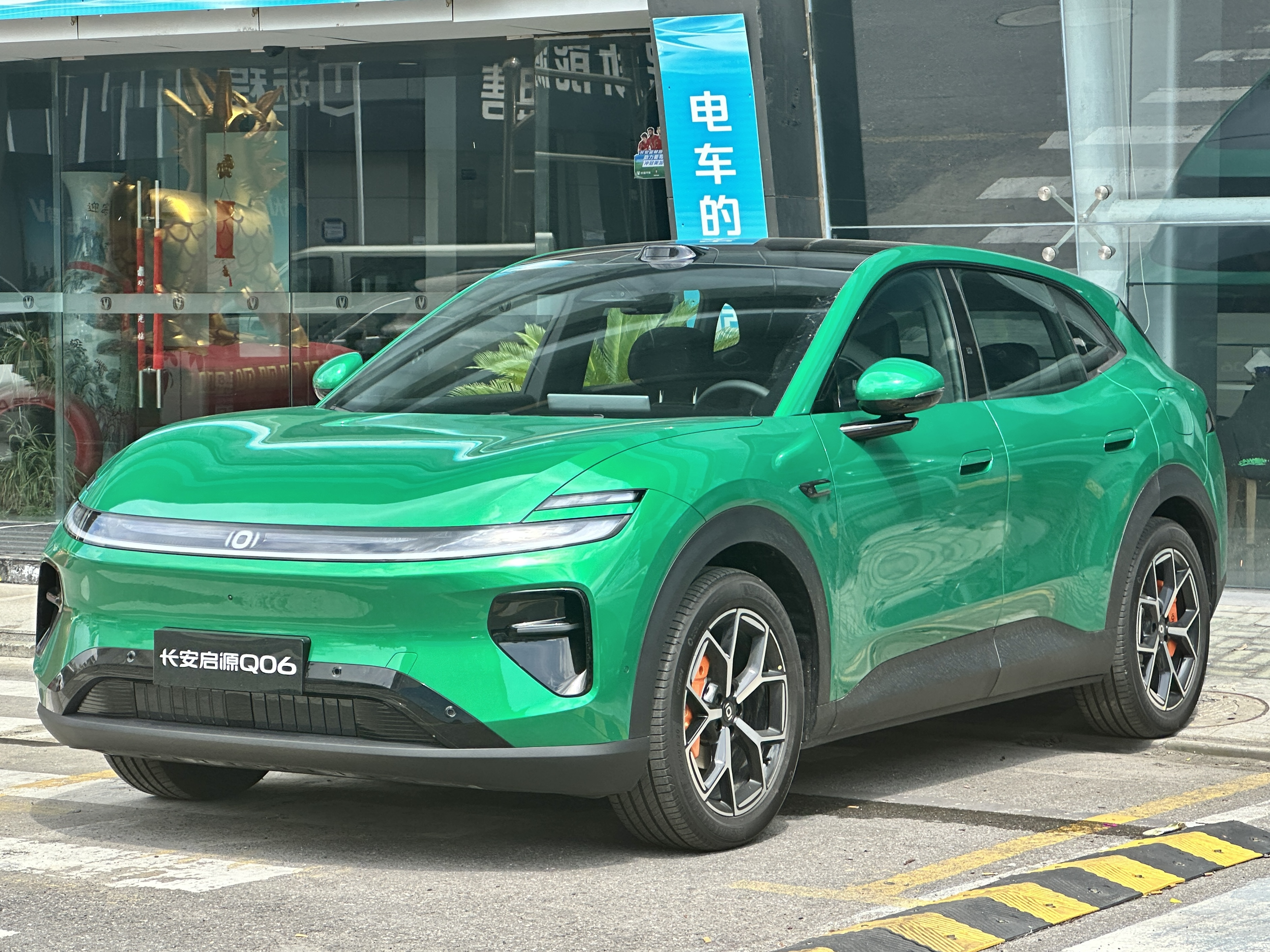

Overview
- Manufacturer: Changan (Nevo)
- Production: 2026–present
- Assembly: China: Nanchang; Thailand: Rayong
- Designer: Klaus Zyciora

Body and chassis
- Class: Mid-size crossover SUV (D)
- Body style: 5-door SUV
- Layout: Battery electric: Rear-motor, rear-wheel-drive; Dual-motor, rear-wheel drive; Range-extended EV: Front-engine, dual-motor, rear-wheel drive
- Platform: Changan SDA platform

Powertrain
- Engine: Petrol range extender: 1.5 L JL469Q1 I4
- Electric motor: EV: 225 kW ATDM04 PMSM; 245 kW TZ190XY008 PMSM; 2× ATDM72 PMSM; EREV: 2× ATDM71 PMSM
- Power output: 302–443 hp (225–330 kW; 306–449 PS)
- Hybrid drivetrain: Series plug-in hybrid (EREV)
- Battery: 28.4 kWh LFP CATL; 66.0 kWh LFP CALB; 80.0 kWh LFP CATL
- Range: 1,600 km (994 mi) (EREV, CLTC)
- Electric range: 602–700 km (374–435 mi) (EV, CLTC); 153 km (95 mi) (EREV, WLTP); 200 km (124 mi) (EREV, CLTC)

Dimensions
- Wheelbase: 2,940 mm (115.7 in)
- Length: 4,837 mm (190.4 in)
- Width: 1,970 mm (77.6 in)
- Height: 1,670 mm (65.7 in)

The Changan Nevo Q06 (Chinese: 长安启源Q06; pinyin: Cháng'ān Qǐyuán Q06) is a battery electric and range extended mid-size crossover SUV produced by Chinese auto manufacturer Changan under the Changan Nevo brand since 2026.

== Overview ==
The exterior design and some technical specs of the Nevo Q06 was initially revealed through China's MIIT documents on 11 April 2026. It was officially unveiled on 15 July 2026. It is positioned between the smaller Q05 and larger Q07.

The Q06's exterior design takes after the brand's "Light-Catching" aesthetic, featuring full-width light bars and a front and rear fascia design reminiscent of the A06 sedan.

The Q06 uses all-aluminium suspension components consisting of a double-wishbone front and five-link independent rear suspension geometries with standard active dampers; Changan Nevo claims that the rear suspension design allows for 6.5% more space for the battery, and the highly integrated nature of the battery packs allow them to be 10 mm (0.39 in) thinner allowing for more passenger space despite maintaining 193 mm (7.6 in) of ground clearance.

The interior uses a wraparound design, incorporating a floating 15.6-inch 2.5K central display, 10.2-inch instrument cluster, 49-inch heads-up display, and a 15.6-inch rear overhead entertainment display, all powered by a Mediatek MT8676 SoC. Changan claims a 91.7% space utilization rate and 965 mm (38.0 in) of rear legroom. The front seats are equipped with heating, suction ventilation, 28-point massage and a zero-gravity reclining feature. It has a 9.5-litre (0.34 cu ft) refrigerator compartment in the center console with a temperature range of −6–50 °C (21–122 °F). The rear seats have access to an optional 15.6-inch 2.5K resolution ceiling-mounted entertainment display. The vehicle has an optional 1280-watt 20-speaker Nevo Sound audio system. The rear seats can recline by up to 145°.

The Q06 comes with two ADAS system configurations. The standard Tian Shu Pro system has a sensor suite consisting of one LiDAR, 3 mmWave radars, 11 cameras, and 12 ultrasonic sensors, and is paired with Horizon Robotics J6M chip capable of 128 TOPS; it is capable of highway assisted driving. The upgraded Tian Shu Ultra system uses a higher-end 256-line LiDAR and is paired with a Horizon Robotics J6P chip capable of 560 TOPS, and is capable of urban and highway assisted driving.

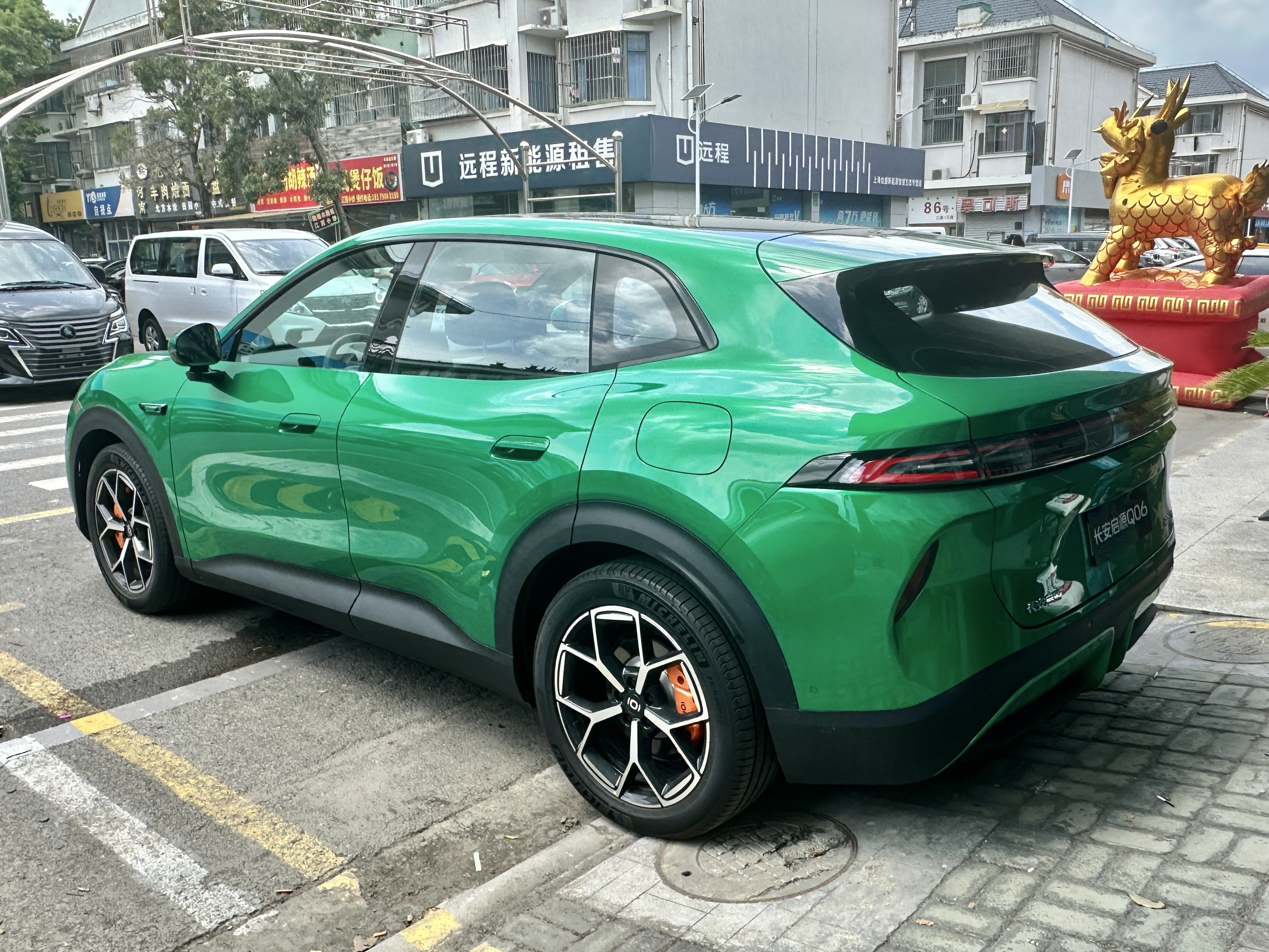
Rear view

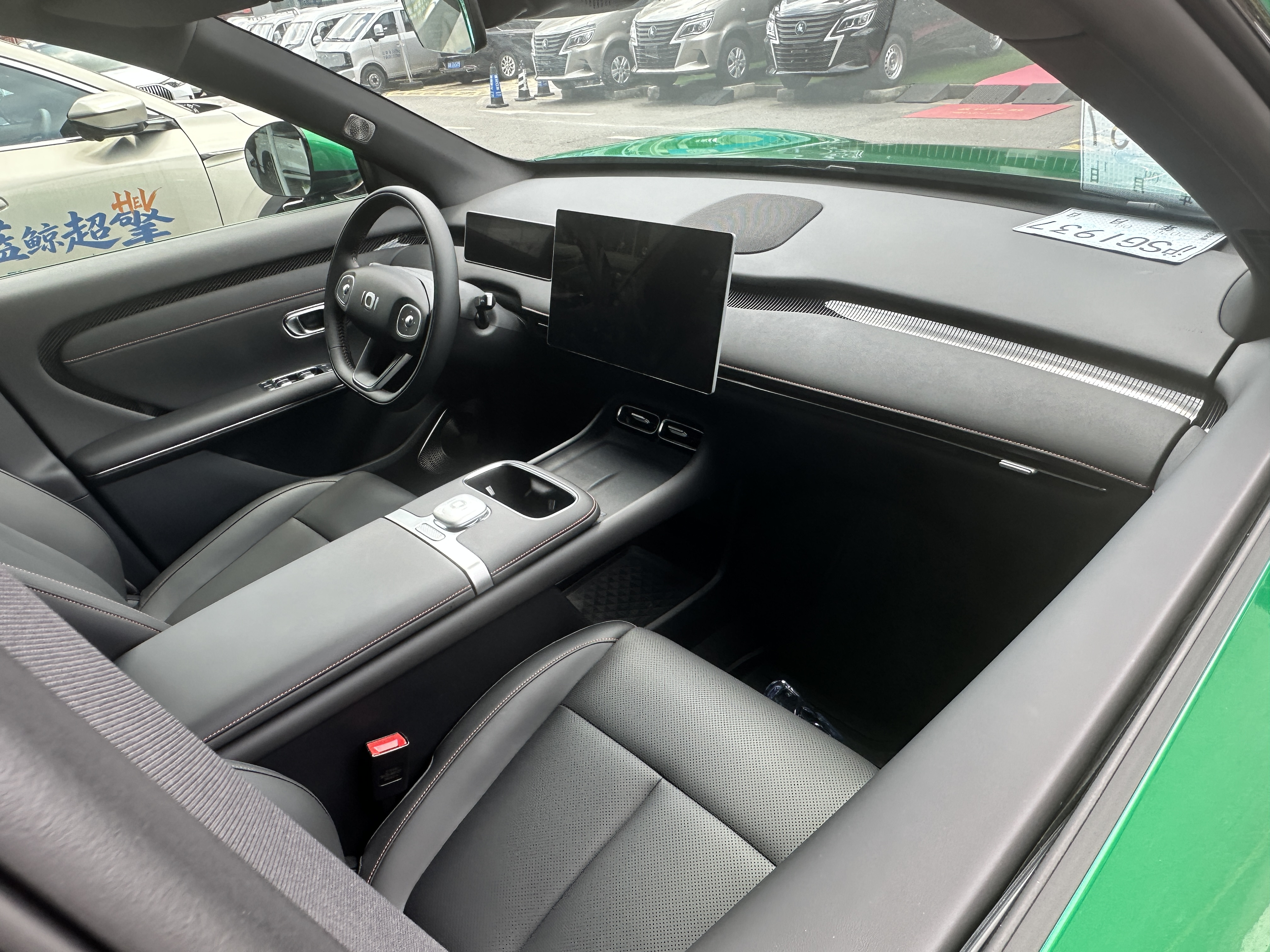
Interior

== Powertrain ==
Both extended-range electric (EREV) and battery electric (BEV) powertrains are available. Models equipped with the former feature an "R" (Q06 R) badge while those with the latter feature an "E" (Q06 E) badge for differentiation.

The EREV version combines a dual-motor setup with a 1.5-litre naturally-aspirated four cylinder range extender rated at 94 hp (70 kW; 95 PS) (97 hp (72 kW; 98 PS) gross) and 125 N⋅m (92 lb⋅ft) of torque at 3,000rpm. It has a compression ratio of 16:1 and uses port injection. It has two individual motor for each rear wheel for a total of 362 hp (270 kW; 367 PS) and 730 N⋅m (538 lb⋅ft) of torque. It is powered by a 28.4 kWh LFP battery supplied by CATL which is capable of 200 km (124 mi) of CLTC electric range and can recharge from 10–80% in 18 minutes with 400-volt class power electronics. It has a top speed of 220 km/h (140 mph).

The BEV version has two single motor options rated for 210 kW (280 hp) and 225 kW (302 hp) respectively, as well as a dual motor option with 330 kW (443 hp). The weaker motor is paired with a CALB-supplied 66kWh LFP battery capable of 602 kilometres (374 mi) of CLTC range. The more powerful models are equipped with an 80kWh LFP battery supplied by CATL which is rated for 700 and 670 kilometres (435 and 416 mi) of CLTC range for the single and dual-motor variants, respectively. All BEV variants use 800-volt power electronics and are capable of 6C charging rates of 10–80% in 12 minutes. Top speed ranges from 200–230 km/h (120–140 mph).

Specifications
Battery		Engine	Motor	Power	Torque	Electric range		10–80% charge time	0–100 km/h (62 mph) time	Top speed	Kerb weight
Type	Weight	Engine	Rear	Power	Torque	WLTP	CLTC	10–80% charge time	0–100 km/h (62 mph) time	Top speed	Kerb weight
28.39 kWh LFP CATL	232 kg (511 lb)	1.5 L JL469Q1 I4	2×ATDM71 PMSM	362 hp (270 kW; 367 PS)	730 N⋅m (538 lb⋅ft)	153 km (95 mi)	200 km (124 mi)	18 min	5.8 sec	220 km/h (137 mph)	1,930 kg (4,255 lb)
66.02 kWh LFP CALB	475 kg (1,047 lb)	—	ATDM04 PMSM	302 hp (225 kW; 306 PS)	290 N⋅m (214 lb⋅ft)	—	602 km (374 mi)	12 min	7.1 sec	200 km/h (124 mph)	1,925 kg (4,244 lb)
80.02 kWh CATL	566 kg (1,248 lb)	—	TZ190XY008 PMSM	328 hp (245 kW; 333 PS)	290 N⋅m (214 lb⋅ft)	—	700 km (435 mi)	12 min	7.1 sec	200 km/h (124 mph)	2,020 kg (4,453 lb)
80.02 kWh CATL	566 kg (1,248 lb)	—	2×ATDM72 PMSM	443 hp (330 kW; 449 PS)	730 N⋅m (538 lb⋅ft)	—	670 km (416 mi)	12 min	4.8 sec	230 km/h (143 mph)	2,060 kg (4,542 lb)
