= Nevo (marque) =

Changan Nevo (Chinese: 长安启源) is a Chinese entry-level premium electric manufacturing company owned by Changan Automobile since 2023.

== Current models ==
- Changan Nevo A05L
- Changan Nevo A06
- Changan Nevo A07
- Changan Nevo E07
- Changan Nevo Q05
- Changan Nevo Q06
- Changan Nevo Q07
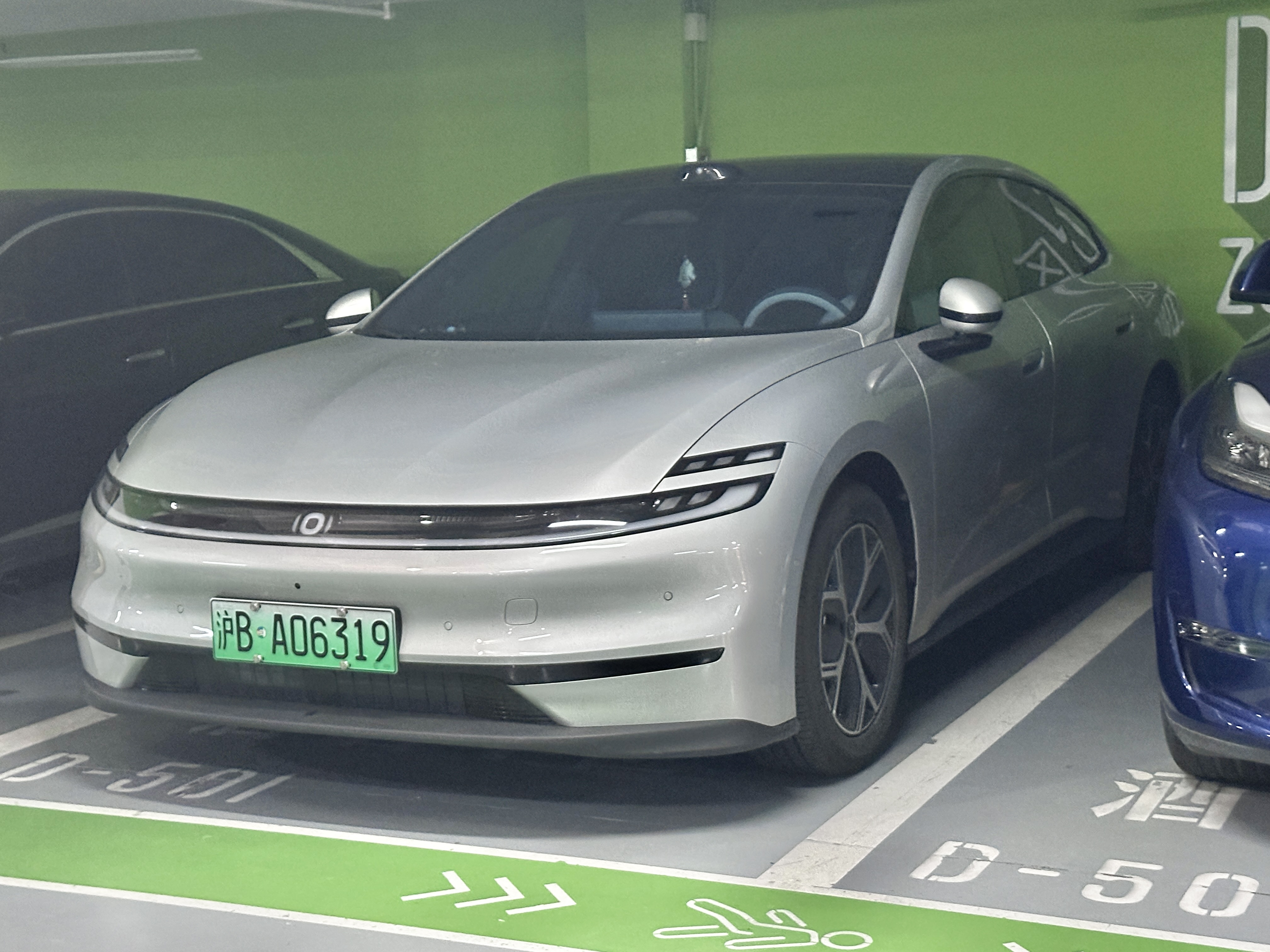
Changan Nevo A06

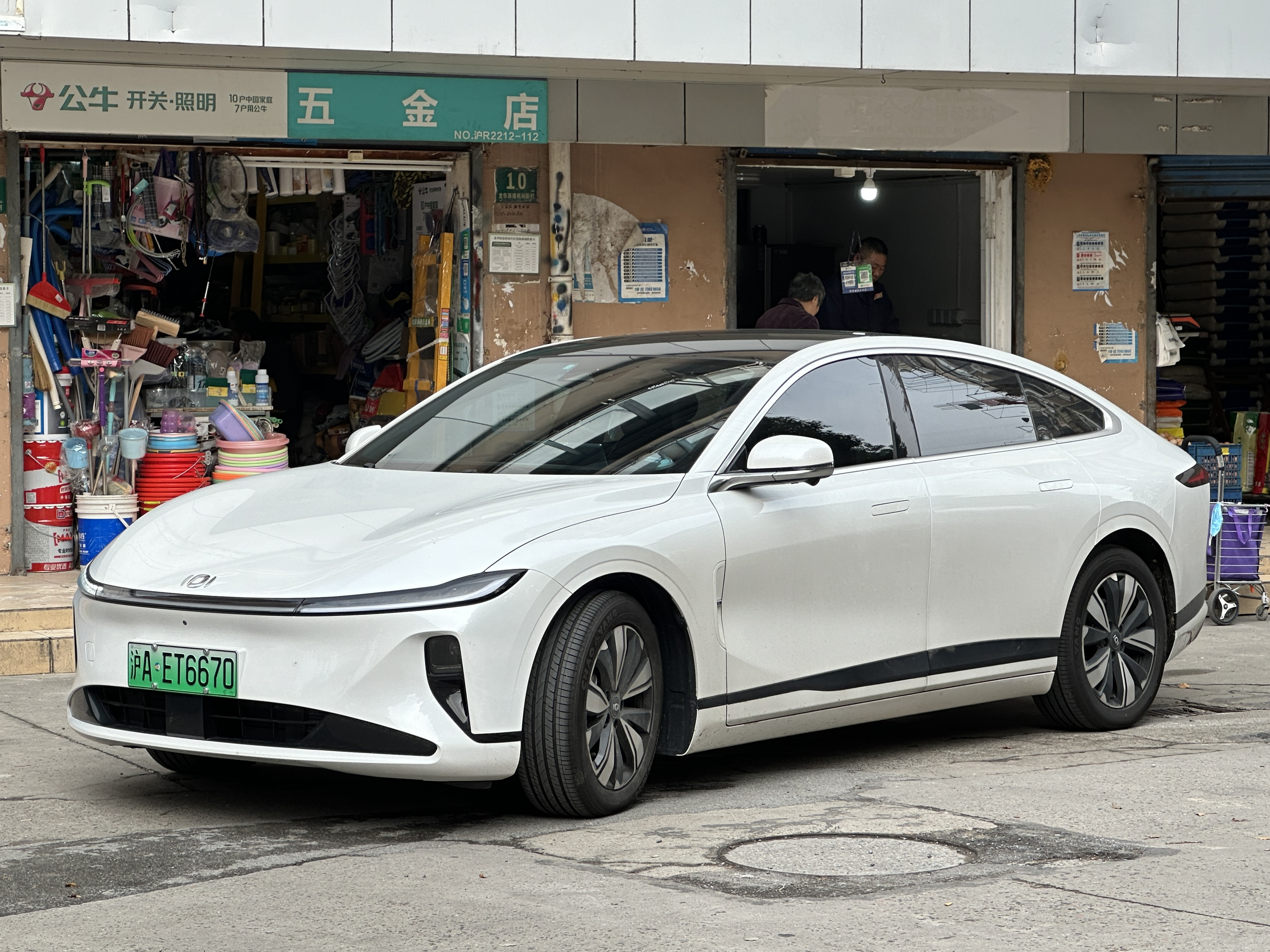
Changan Nevo A07

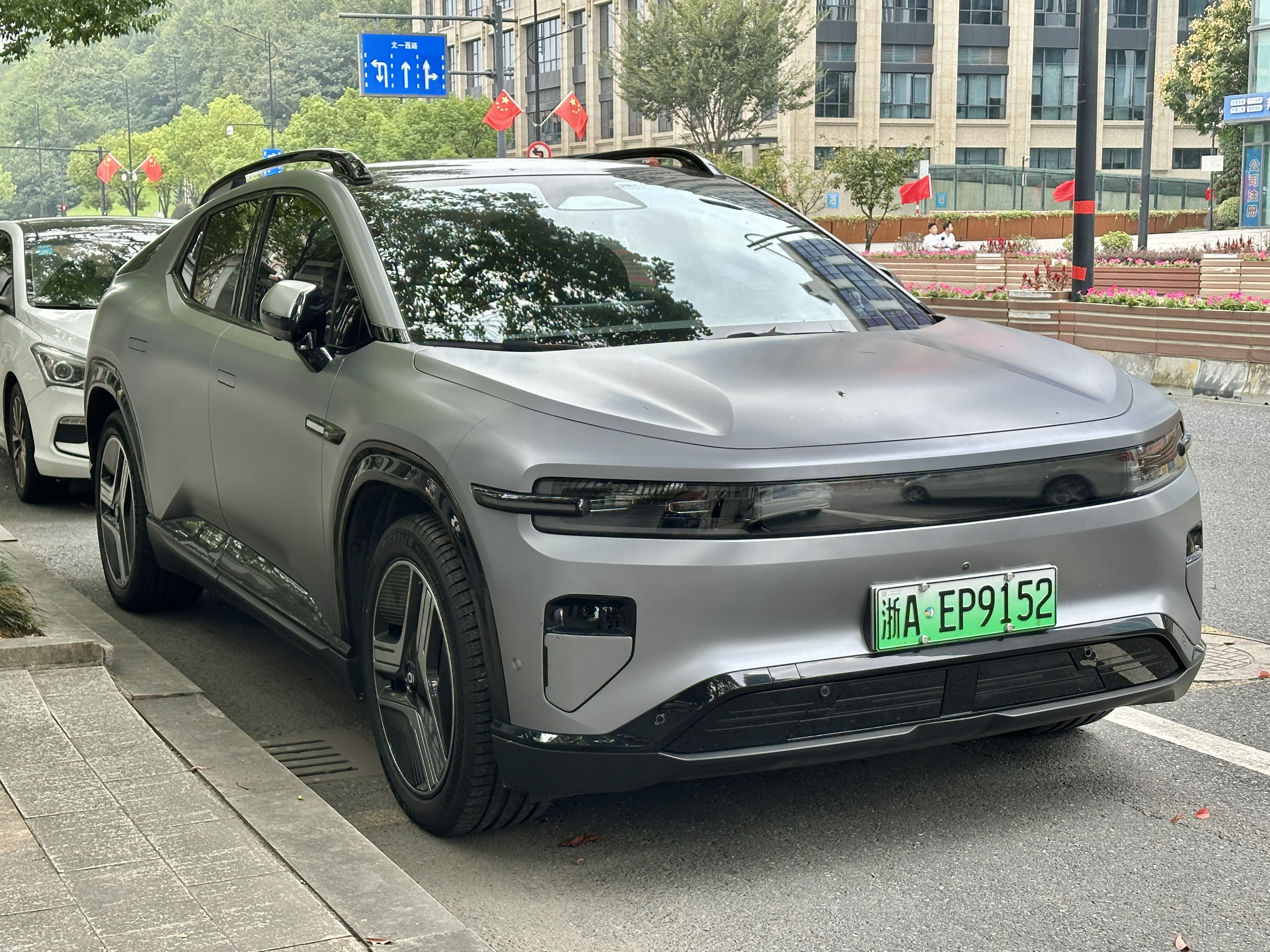
Changan Nevo E07

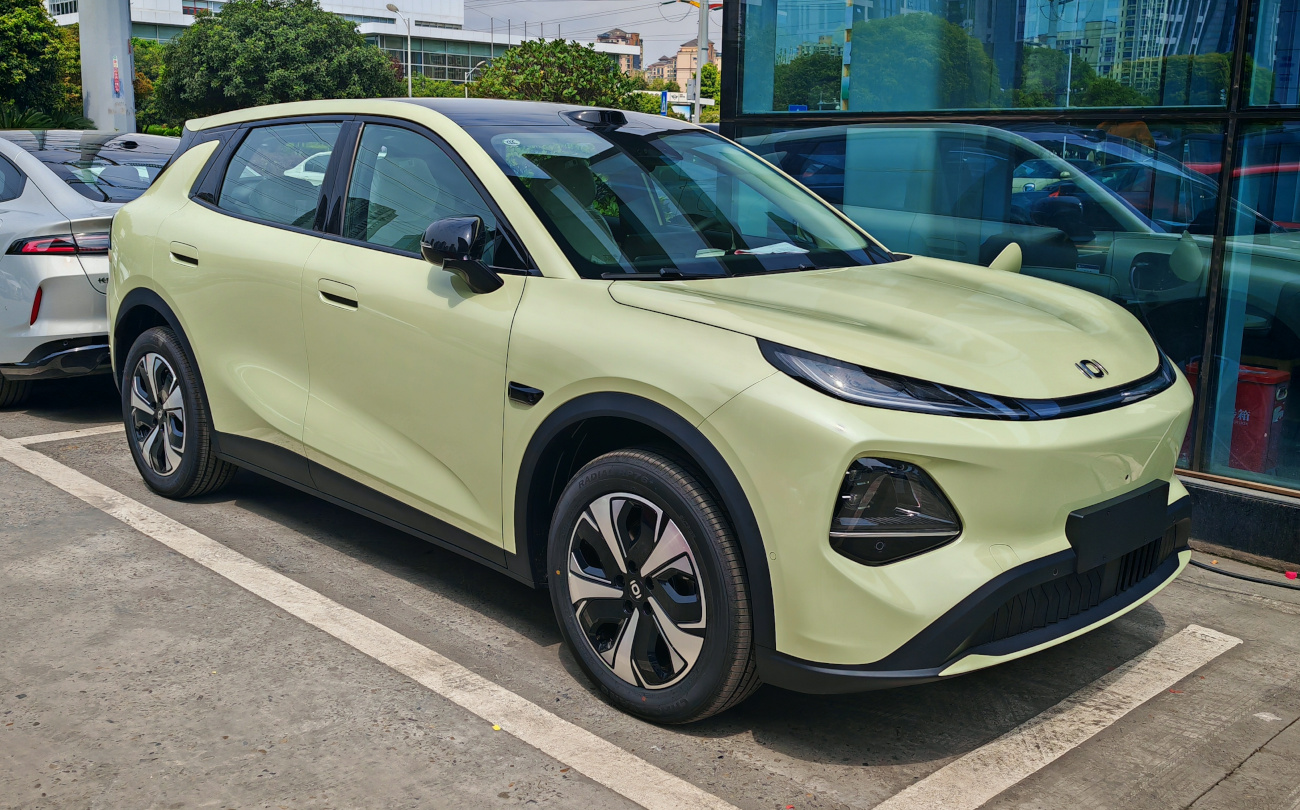
Changan Nevo Q05 (second generation)

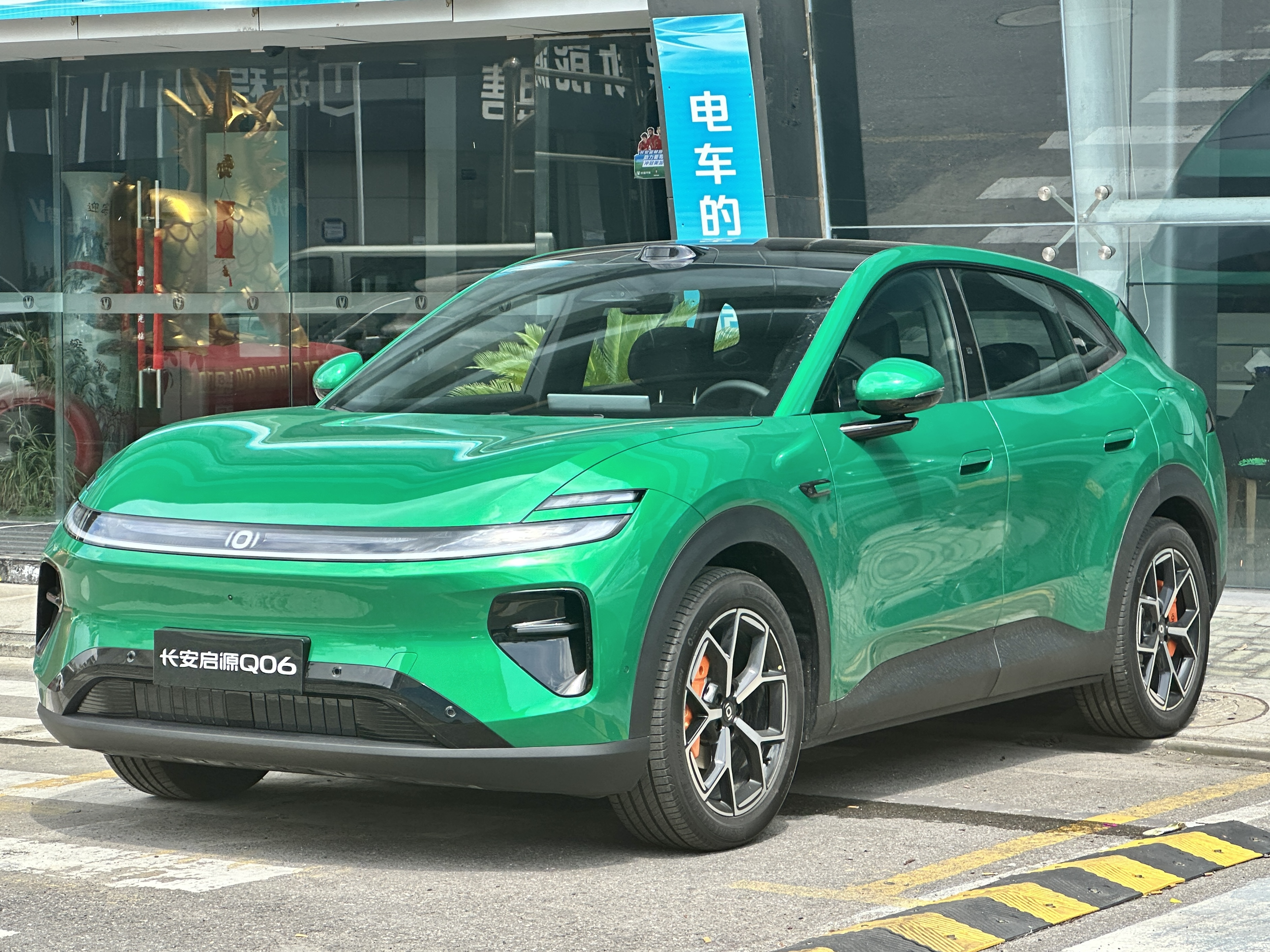
Changan Nevo Q06

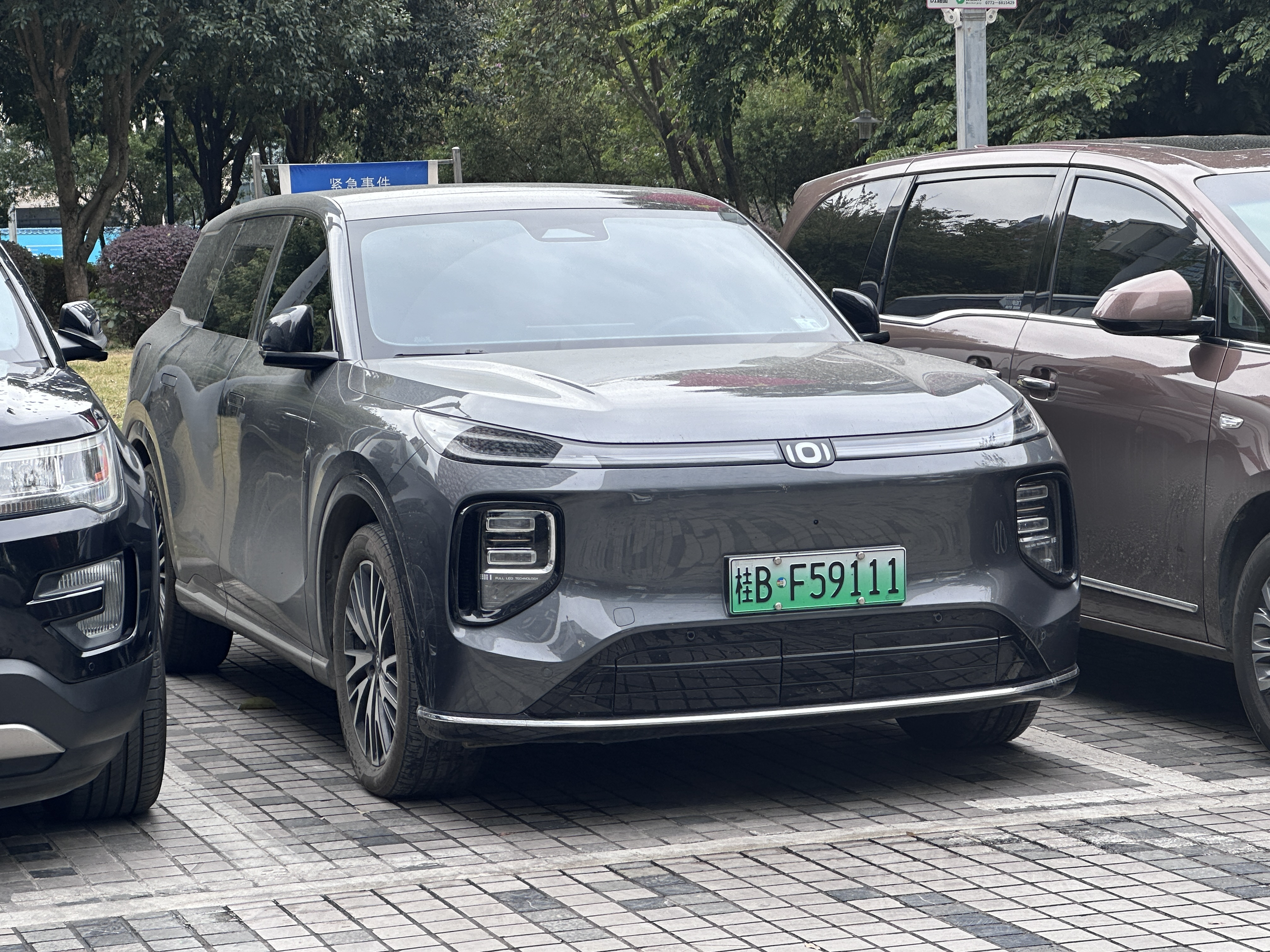
Changan Nevo Q07

== Discontinued models ==
- Changan Nevo A05
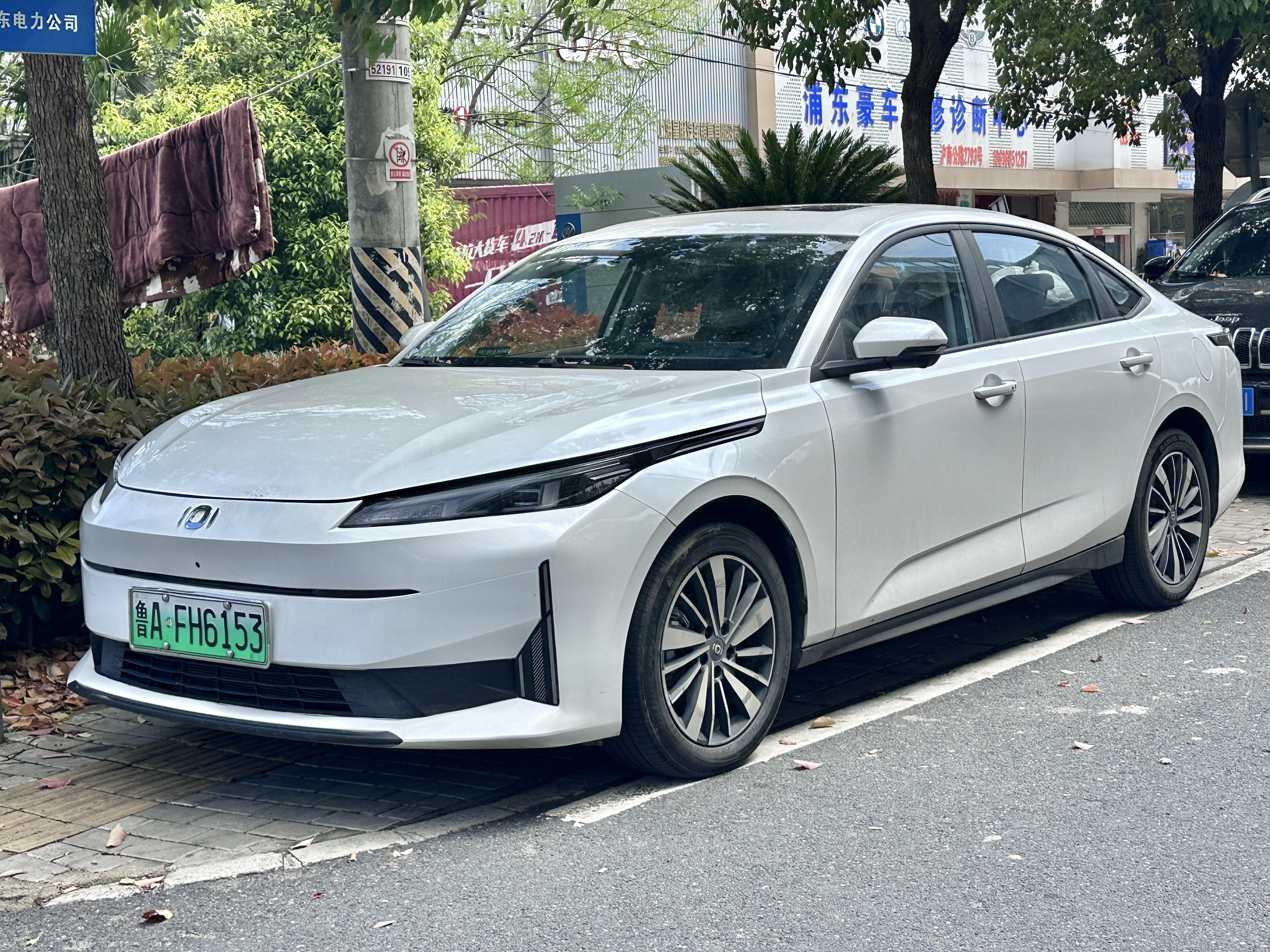
Changan Nevo A05

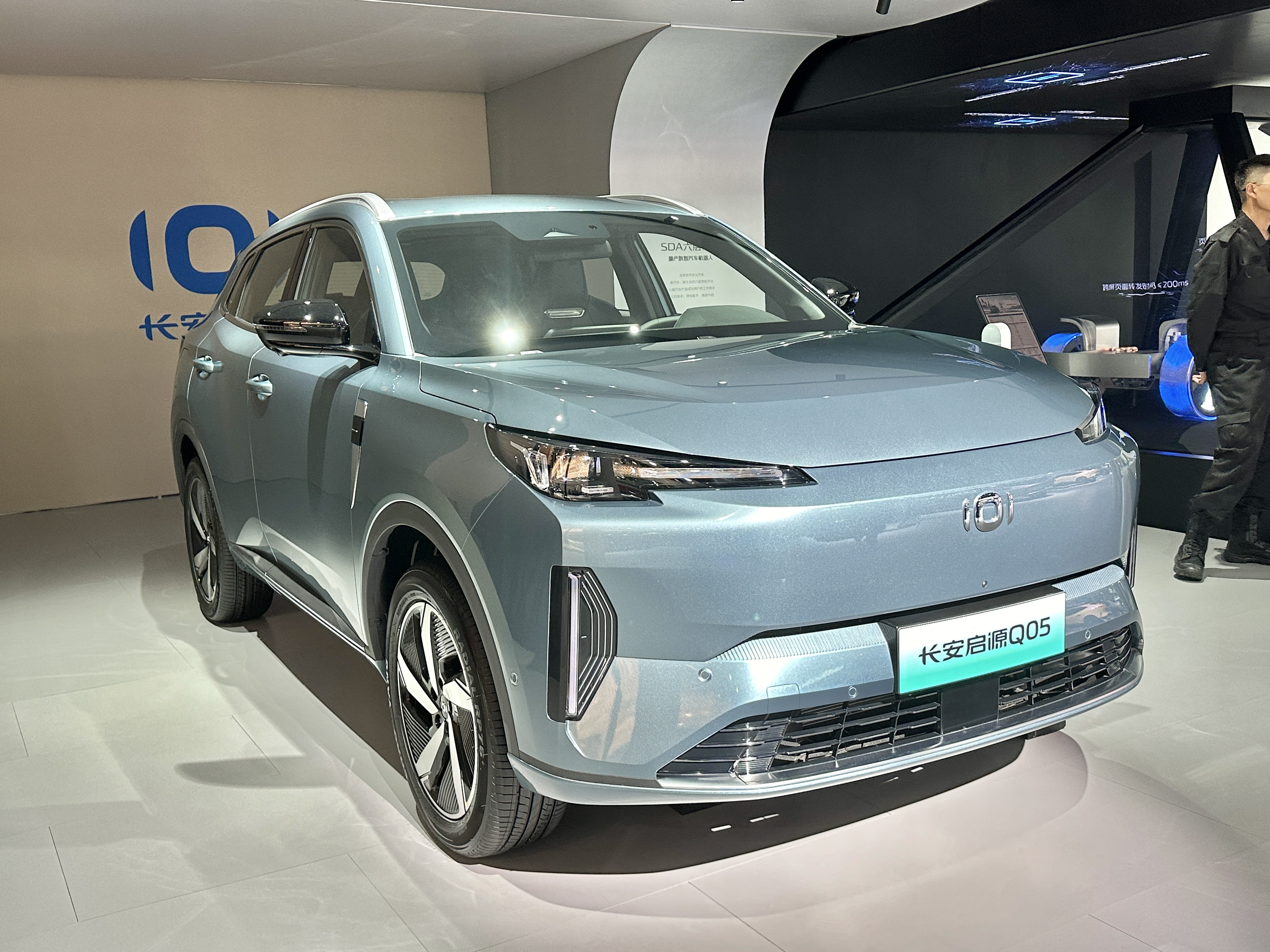
Changan Nevo Q05 (first generation)
