= Lamore =

Lamore' may refer to:

- Clara LaMore, American swimmer
- Changan Lamore, compact car produced by Chinese auto manufacturer Changan
- François Lamore (born 1952), French and American artist
- Uèle Lamore (born 1993), French orchestra conductor, composer and music arranger

== See also ==
- James McLamore, American entrepreneur, the founder and first CEO of the Burger King
- L'amore
