= Changan Nevo Q07 =

Plug-in hybrid mid-size crossover SUV

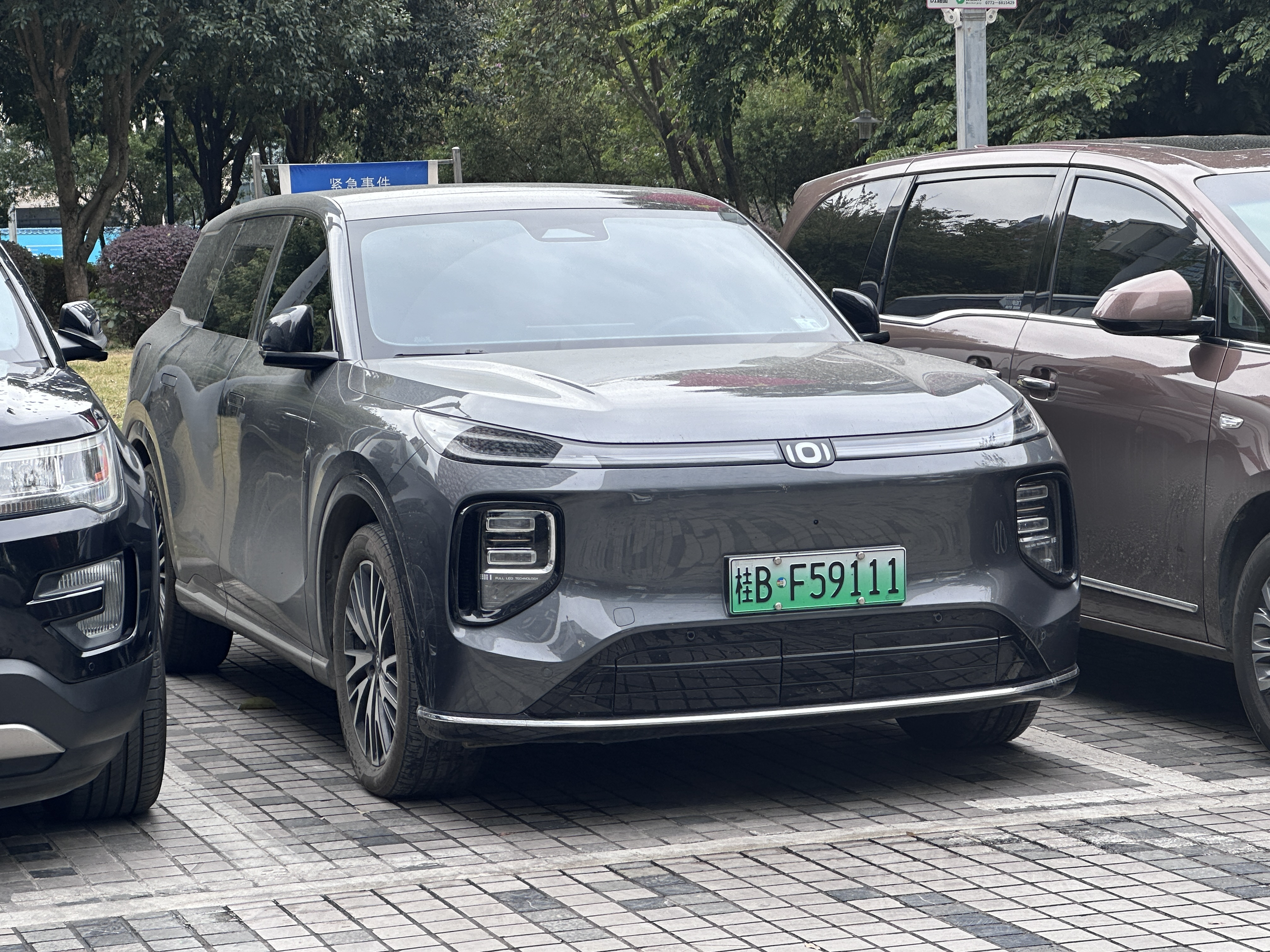

Overview
- Manufacturer: Changan (Nevo)
- Model code: C798
- Production: 2025–present
- Assembly: China: Nanchang
- Designer: Klaus Zyciora

Body and chassis
- Class: Mid-size crossover SUV
- Body style: 5-door SUV
- Layout: Front-engine, rear-motor, rear-wheel-drive (EREV); Front-engine, dual-motor, all-wheel-drive (EREV)
- Platform: Changan SDA platform

Powertrain
- Engine: Petrol plug-in hybrid: 1.5 L JL469Q1 I4; 1.5 L JL469ZQ1 I4 turbo
- Power output: 318–389 hp (237–290 kW; 322–394 PS)
- Transmission: eCVT
- Battery: 21.5 kWh LFP Freevoy CATL; 31.7 kWh LFP Freevoy CATL
- Range: 1,345–1,400 km (836–870 mi) (CLTC)
- Electric range: 111–166 km (69–103 mi) (WLTP); 145–215 km (90–134 mi) (CLTC)
- Plug-in charging: DC: 70–97 kW; 30–80%: 15 min

Dimensions
- Wheelbase: 2,905 mm (114.4 in)
- Length: 4,837 mm (190.4 in)
- Width: 1,920 mm (75.6 in)
- Height: 1,690 mm (66.5 in)
- Curb weight: 1,785–1,935 kg (3,935–4,266 lb)

The Changan Nevo Q07 (Chinese: 长安启源Q07; pinyin: Cháng'ān Qǐyuán Q07) is a plug-in hybrid mid-size crossover SUV produced by Chinese auto manufacturer Changan under the Changan Nevo brand since 2025.

== Overview ==
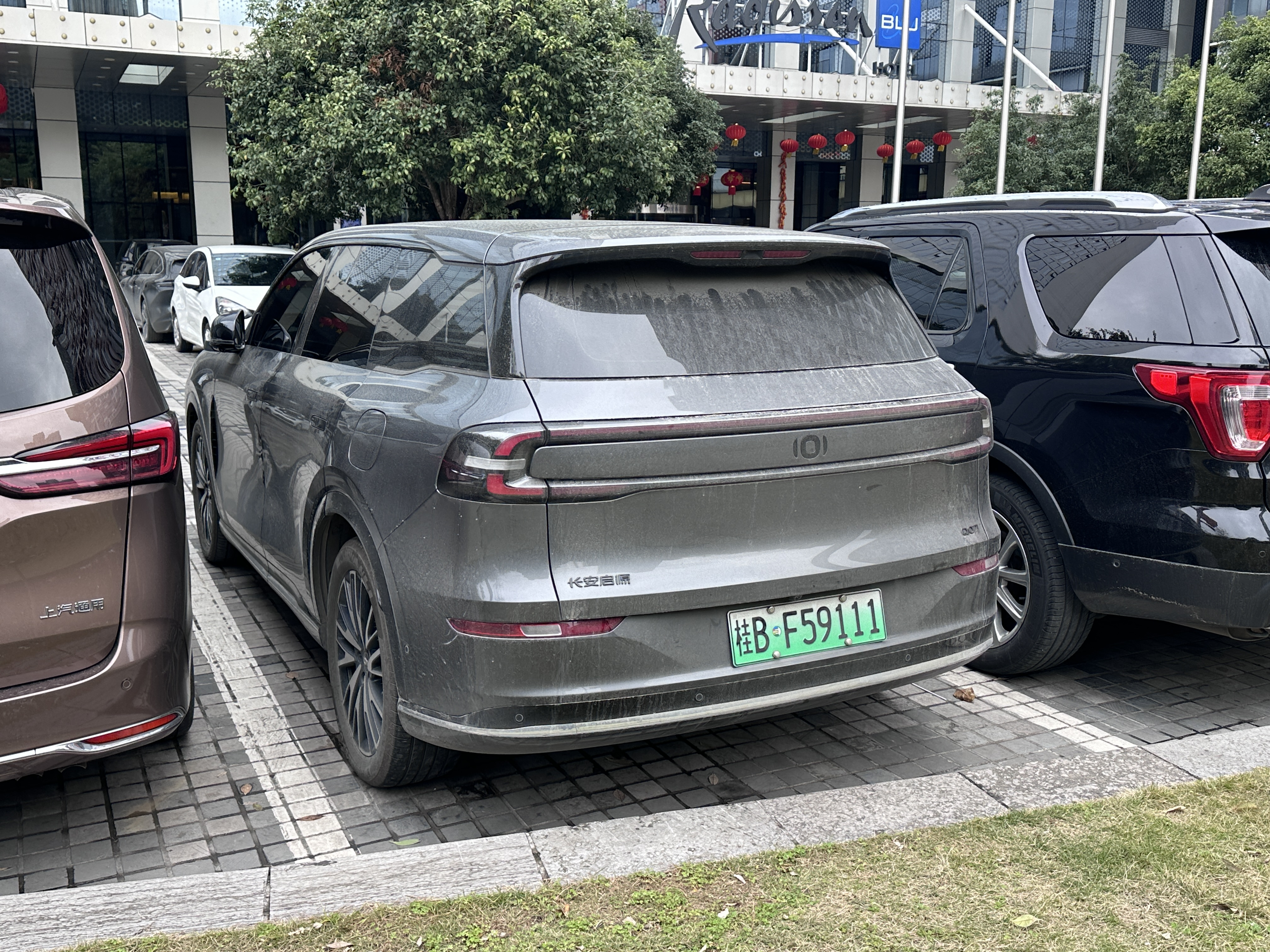
Rear view

The Nevo Q07 is a two-row 5-seater mid-size crossover SUV which was first known as the Changan Nevo C798 before its name was changed to Q07 in January 2025. It was launched in April 2025, with deliveries starting in April 2025.

The Q07 is Changan’s first product to be integrated with the DeepSeek AI model.

The Q07 has a 2.5K-resolution 15.4-inch central infotainment touchscreen, and is equipped with a 49-inch AR-HUD rather than having an instrument panel; t also has an optional 12.8-inch passenger entertainment display. The infotainment systems are powered by a Qualcomm Snapdragon 8155 for lower models, while higher trims use a SiEngine SE1000 SoC. It uses a column shifter and has dual 50-watt active-cooled wireless charging pads on the center console. It has a 1.2 m^{2} (13 sq ft) panoramic sunroof and is equipped with a 16-speaker sound system. The driver's seat has heating, ventilation, and massage functions, and both front row seats have a 'zero-gravity' recline function.

The Q07 has MacPherson strut front and multilink independent rear suspension geometries, and is available with continuous damping control.

The Q07 is available with two different ADAS systems. The standard Tian Shu Navigator (Chinese: 天枢领航; pinyin: Tiānshū lǐngháng) Vision system uses a sensor suite consisting of 5 mmWave radars, 5 cameras, and 12 ultrasonic sensors, and is capable of Level 2 assisted autonomous driving in highway conditions. The optional Tian Shu Navigator LiDAR system has one roof-mounted LiDAR, 3 mmWave radars, 11 cameras, and 12 ultrasonic sensors, and is powered by a Horizon Robotics Journey 6M SoC capable of 128 TOPS, and is capable of L2 assisted autonomous driving in highway and urban conditions.

=== 2027 update ===
For 2027, the Nevo Q07 receives minor changes and equipment reconfigurations. The exterior is now available with a new Starry Purple paint option, while active grille shutters become standard. The interior gets a new Dawn Glow Beige upholstery option, and all versions now use the SiEngine SE1000 infotainment chip with 4G connectivity and 16GB of RAM and 128GB of storage, and the infotainment system now supports ICCOA Carlink. All variants are equipped with the LiDAR-based ADAS system as standard, which has been renamed to Tian Shu Navigator Pro.

== Powertrain ==
The Nevo Q07 is powered by Changan's smart BlueCore 3.0 plug-in hybrid system. The Q07 is available with either 1.5-liter naturally-aspirated or 1.5-liter turbocharged petrol engines exclusively in a front-wheel drive configuration. The 1.5-liter engine outputs 97 hp (72 kW; 98 PS) is paired with a 165 kW (221 hp; 224 PS) electric motor for a total of 318 hp (237 kW; 322 PS). The 1.5-liter turbocharged engine outputs 148 hp (110 kW; 150 PS) for a total of 369 hp (275 kW; 374 PS) with the same electric motor. Both engines are paired with an eCVT transmission.

The Q07 is available with a choice of LFP CATL Freevoy battery packs with 21.5 or 31.7 kWh capacities, providing CLTC EV range ratings of 145 km (90 mi) and 215 km (134 mi), respectively. The Golden Shield battery has 3C charging capabilities which enables a 30–80% charge time of 15 minutes.

For the 2027 model year, the smaller 21.5 kWh battery pack is discontinued and the electric motor has been upgraded. The new motor is codenamed ATDM09 and outputs 241 hp (180 kW; 244 PS) and 290 N⋅m (214 lb⋅ft) of torque, which generates a combined output of 338 hp (252 kW; 343 PS) and 415 N⋅m (306 lb⋅ft) of torque with the base engine and 389 hp (290 kW; 394 PS) and 510 N⋅m (376 lb⋅ft) of torque with the turbocharged engine. 0–100 km/h (62 mph) acceleration times decrease to 7.4 seconds for both models, while range ratings and top speed remain unchanged.

Specifications
Model year	Battery		Engine			Motor		Combined		Electric range		DC charging		0–100 km/h (62 mph) time	Weight
Model year	Type	Weight	Type	Power	Torque	Power	Torque	Power	Torque	WLTP	CLTC	Peak	30–80% time	0–100 km/h (62 mph) time	Weight
2025 1.5 L	21.5 kWh LFP Freevoy CATL	195 kg (430 lb)	JL469Q1 1.5 L I4 MPFI 16:1 CR	97 hp (72 kW; 98 PS) @5,600 rpm	125 N⋅m (92 lb⋅ft) @3,000 rpm	221 hp (165 kW; 224 PS)	330 N⋅m (243 lb⋅ft)	318 hp (237 kW; 322 PS)	455 N⋅m (336 lb⋅ft)	111 km (69 mi)	145 km (90 mi)	70 kW	15 min	7.36 s	1,785 kg (3,935 lb)
2025 Long-range 1.5 L	31.7 kWh LFP Freevoy CATL	260 kg (573 lb)	JL469Q1 1.5 L I4 MPFI 16:1 CR	97 hp (72 kW; 98 PS) @5,600 rpm	125 N⋅m (92 lb⋅ft) @3,000 rpm	221 hp (165 kW; 224 PS)	330 N⋅m (243 lb⋅ft)	318 hp (237 kW; 322 PS)	455 N⋅m (336 lb⋅ft)	166 km (103 mi)	215 km (134 mi)	97 kW	15 min	7.58 s	1,875 kg (4,134 lb)
2027 1.5 L	31.7 kWh LFP Freevoy CATL	260 kg (573 lb)	JL469Q1 1.5 L I4 MPFI 16:1 CR	97 hp (72 kW; 98 PS) @5,600 rpm	125 N⋅m (92 lb⋅ft) @3,000 rpm	241 hp (180 kW; 244 PS)	290 N⋅m (214 lb⋅ft)	338 hp (252 kW; 343 PS)	415 N⋅m (306 lb⋅ft)	166 km (103 mi)	215 km (134 mi)	97 kW	15 min	7.4 s	1,875 kg (4,134 lb)
2025 Long-range 1.5 T	31.7 kWh LFP Freevoy CATL	260 kg (573 lb)	JL469ZQ1 1.5 L I4 turbo DI 16:1 CR	148 hp (110 kW; 150 PS) @5,000 rpm	220 N⋅m (162 lb⋅ft) @3,200-4,200 rpm	221 hp (165 kW; 224 PS)	330 N⋅m (243 lb⋅ft)	369 hp (275 kW; 374 PS)	550 N⋅m (406 lb⋅ft)	163 km (101 mi)	215 km (134 mi)	97 kW	15 min	7.57 s	1,935 kg (4,266 lb)
2027 1.5 T	31.7 kWh LFP Freevoy CATL	260 kg (573 lb)	JL469ZQ1 1.5 L I4 turbo DI 16:1 CR	148 hp (110 kW; 150 PS) @5,000 rpm	220 N⋅m (162 lb⋅ft) @3,200-4,200 rpm	241 hp (180 kW; 244 PS)	290 N⋅m (214 lb⋅ft)	389 hp (290 kW; 394 PS)	510 N⋅m (376 lb⋅ft)	163 km (101 mi)	215 km (134 mi)	97 kW	15 min	7.41 s	1,935 kg (4,266 lb)

== Sales ==
Year	China
2025	60,706
