= Changan Nevo A06 =

Mid-size sedan

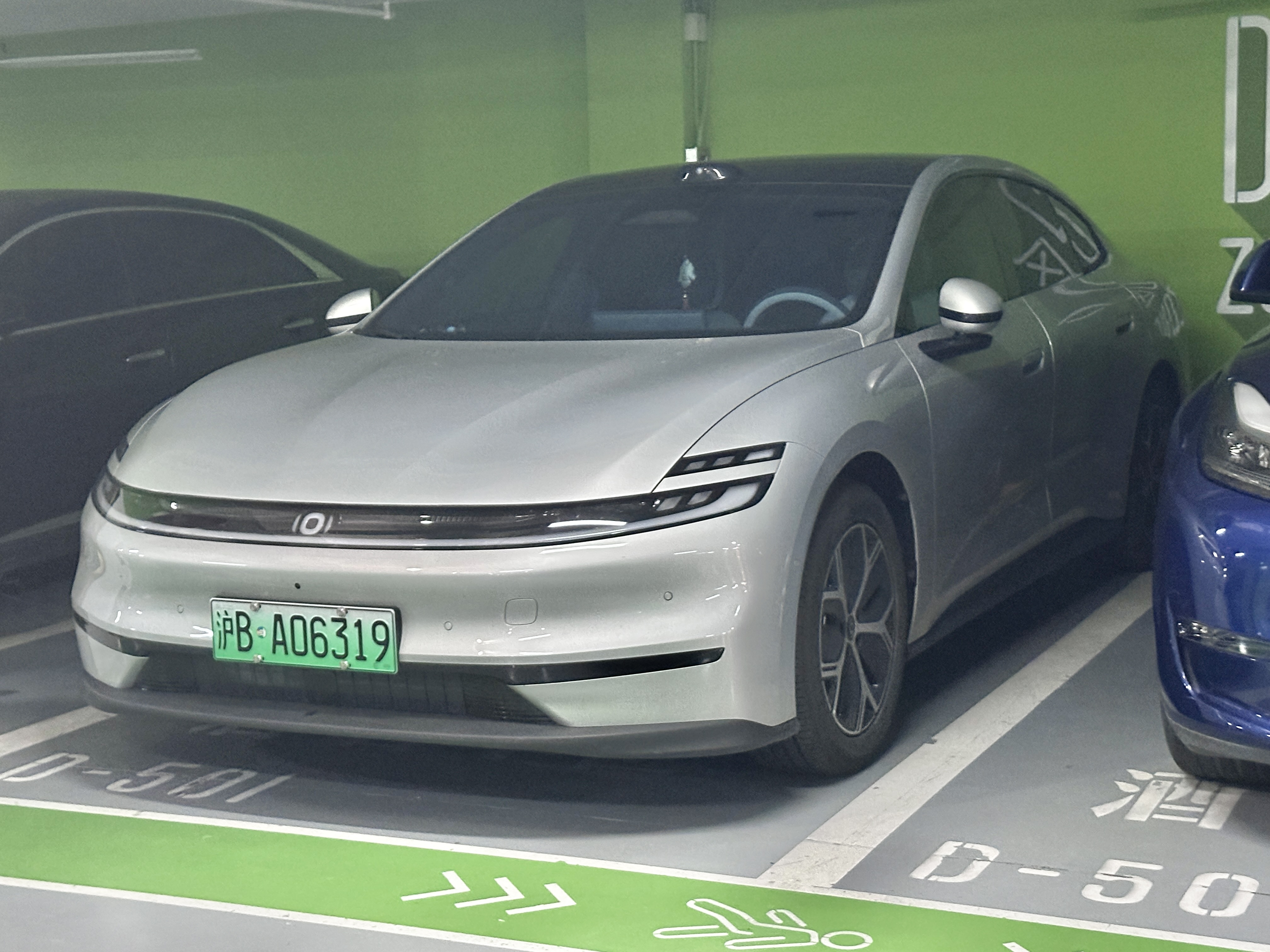

Overview
- Manufacturer: Changan (Nevo)
- Production: 2023–present
- Model years: 2025–present

Body and chassis
- Class: Mid-size car (D)
- Body style: 4-door sedan
- Layout: FR layout

The Changan Nevo A06 (Chinese: 长安启源A06) is a battery electric and range extender mid-size sedan produced by Chinese auto manufacturer Changan under the Changan Nevo.

== First generation (2023, cancelled) ==
The first generation Nevo A06 was originally planned to be launched in 2023 as a plug-in hybrid version of the Changan UNI-V sedan. Images of the A06 were published, but plans were changed before launch and was sold as a variant of the UNI-V called the UNI-V iDD instead in 2024. The iDD plug-in hybrid system powertrain of the UNI-V iDD is composed of a 1.5 liter engine and a front positioned electric motor, mated to an E-CVT gearbox. Several early production vehicles were built before the plan change.

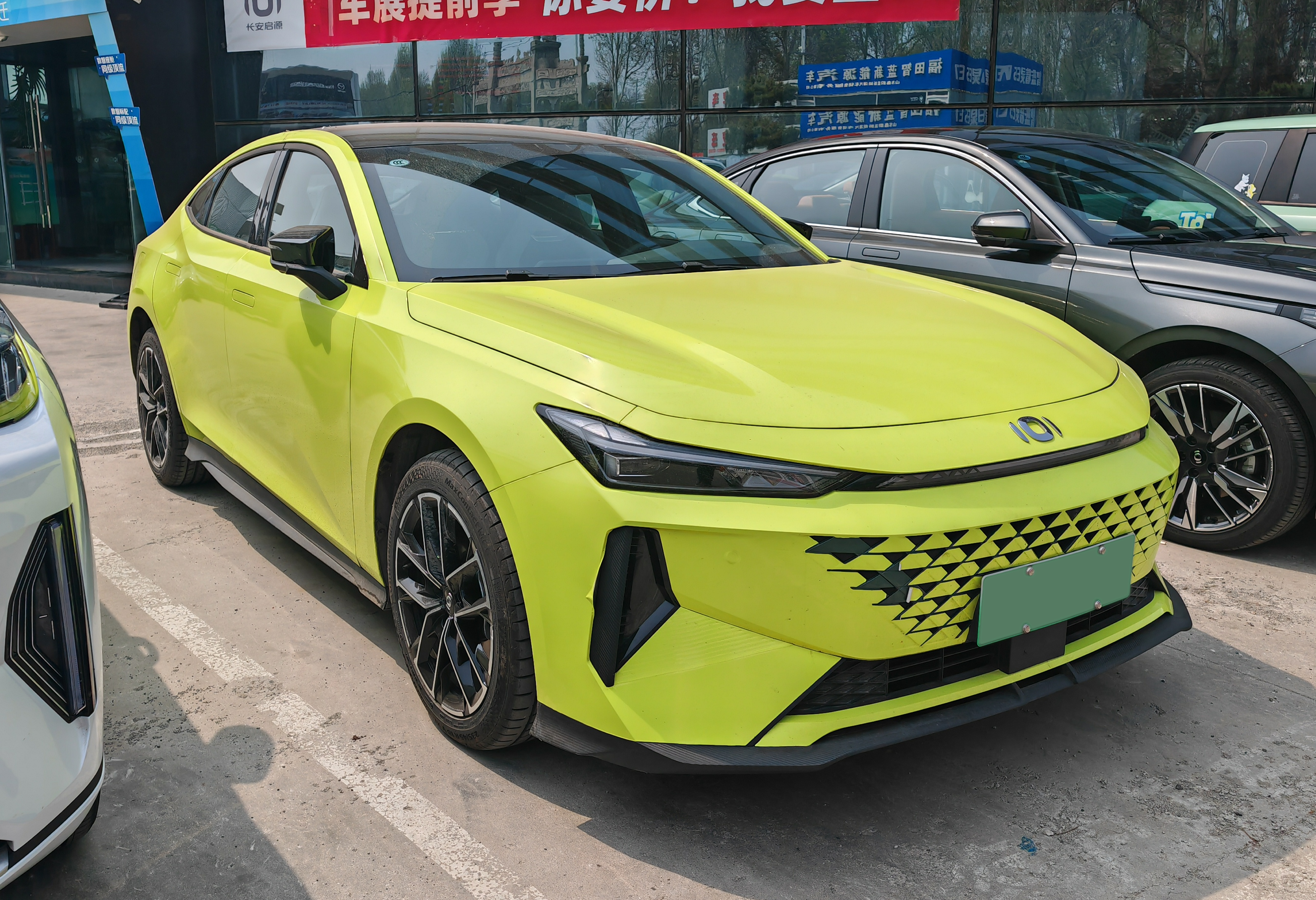
Changan Nevo A06 (cancelled)

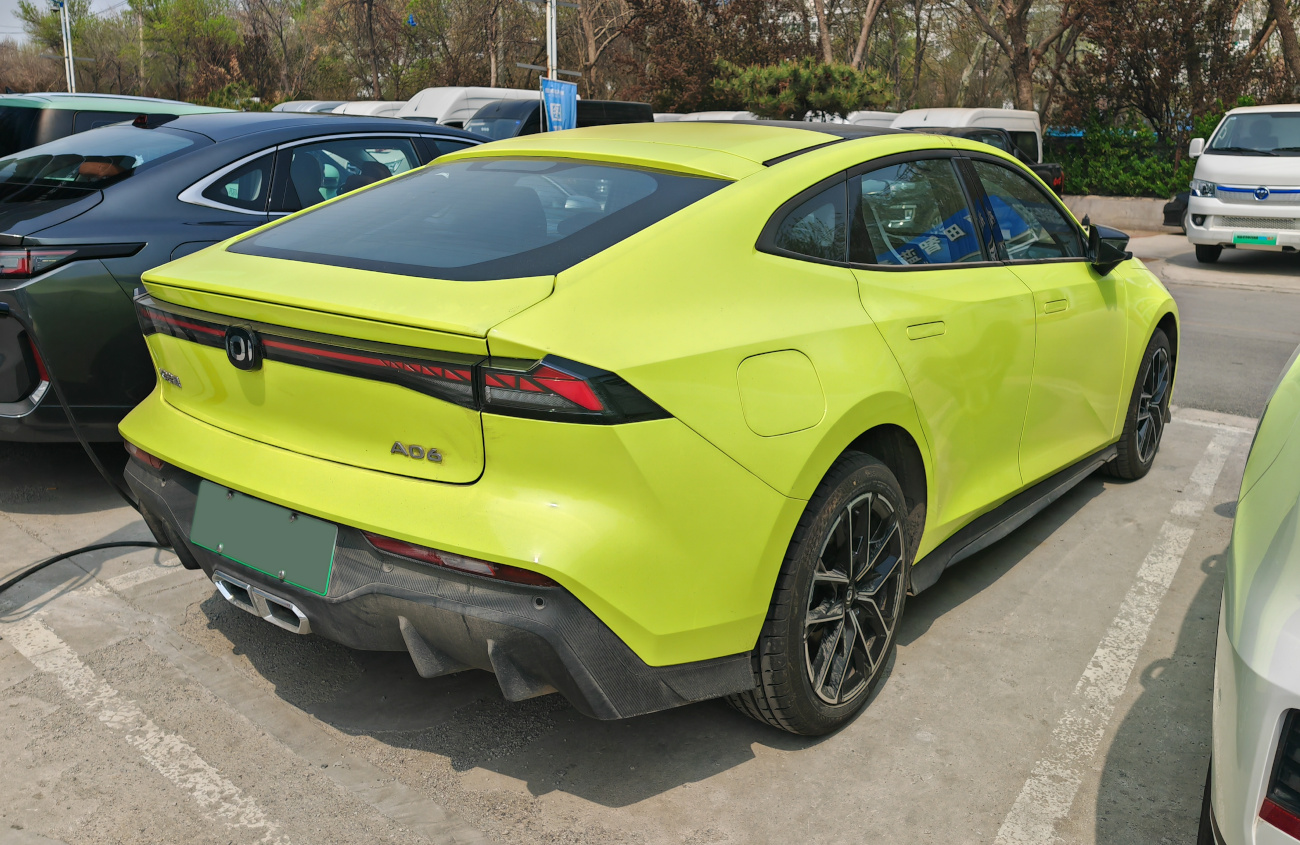
Rear view

== Second generation (2025) ==
Changan Nevo A06
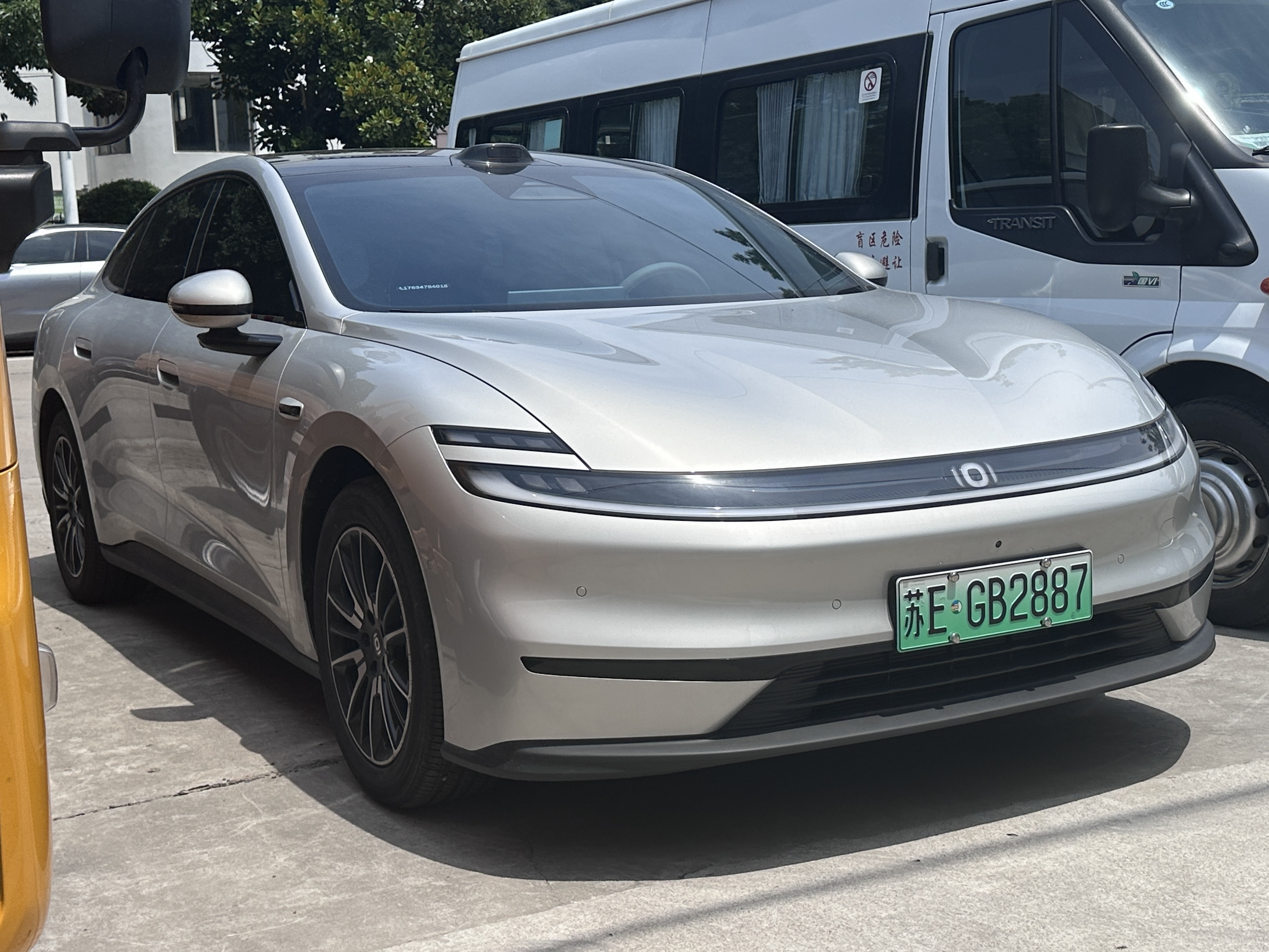

Overview
- Model code: C390
- Production: November 2025 – present
- Assembly: China: Nanchang
- Designer: Klaus Zyciora

Body and chassis
- Layout: Front-engine, rear-motor, rear-wheel-drive (EREV); Front-engine, dual-motor, all-wheel-drive (EREV)
- Platform: Changan SDA platform
- Related: Changan Nevo E07

Powertrain
- Engine: Petrol range extender: 1.5 L JL469Q1 I4
- Electric motor: Permanent magnet synchronous: 120 kW TZ180XS002; 210 kW ATDM04
- Power output: 163–286 PS (120–210 kW; 161–282 hp)
- Battery: 23.4 kWh LFP CATL; 51.5 kWh LFP Gotion; 63.2 kWh LFP Gotion
- Range: 2,120 km (1,317 mi) (EREV, CLTC)
- Electric range: 510–620 km (317–385 mi) (EV, CLTC); 180 km (112 mi) (EREV, WLTP); 240 km (149 mi) (EREV, CLTC)

Dimensions
- Wheelbase: 2,922 mm (115.0 in)
- Length: 4,885 mm (192.3 in)
- Width: 1,916 mm (75.4 in)
- Height: 1,496 mm (58.9 in)
- Curb weight: 1,750–1,887 kg (3,858–4,160 lb)

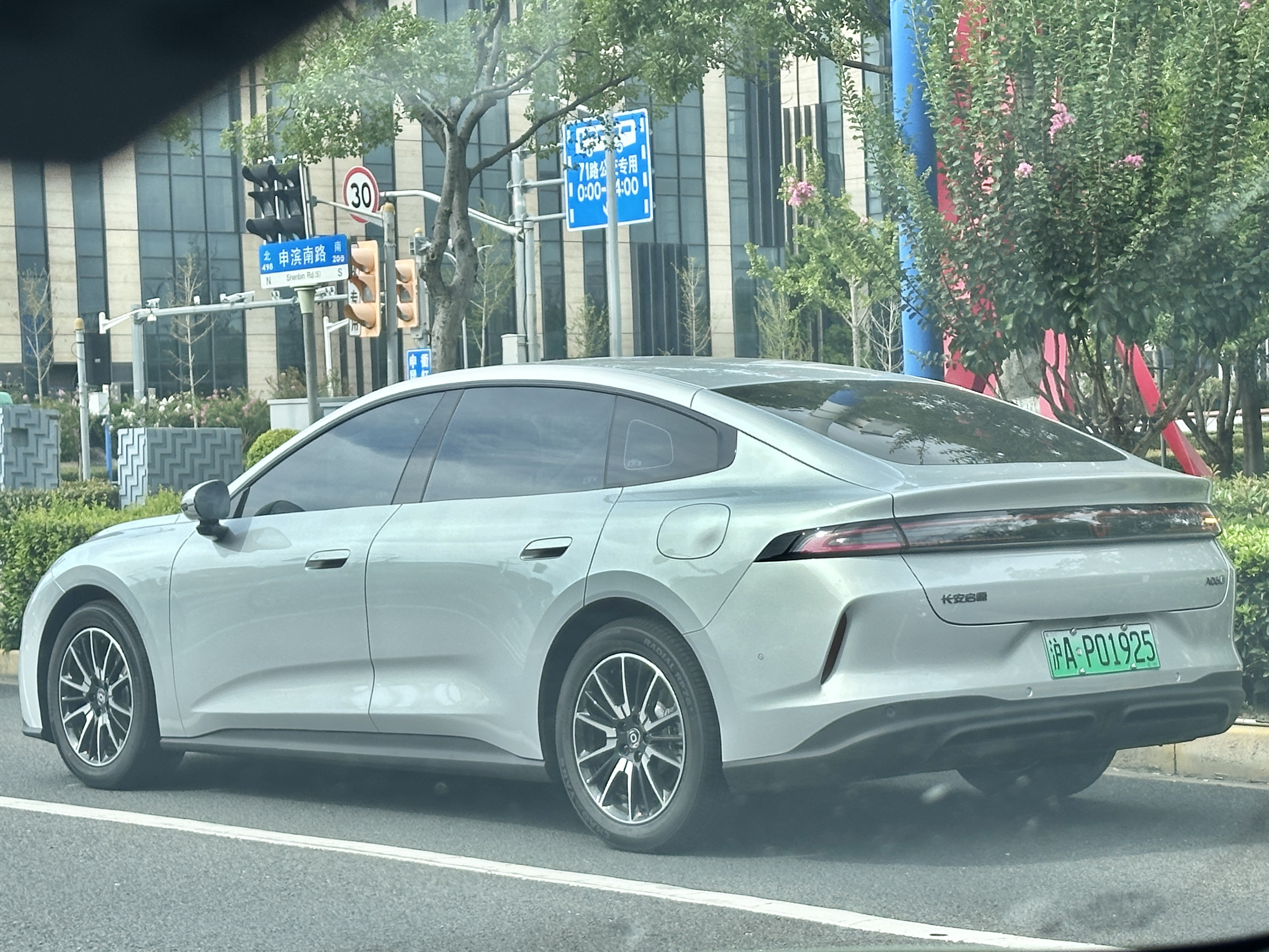
Rear view

The Nevo A06 was first officially revealed in China on 5 September 2025, with pre-sales opening later that month on 28 September and went on sale in the Chinese market on 9 November 2025. It is based on Changan's Super DNA (SDA) platform, and is available in both battery electric and range-extender powertrains. It aims to compete in the Chinese market against competitors such as the BYD Qin L and Geely Galaxy A7.

The front of the vehicle consists of a 2,258 mm (88.9 in) front light bar consisting of 236 LEDs, while the taillights consist of 274 LEDs which can show a customized design. It has a drag coefficient of 0.217 or 0.205 Cd.

The dashboard has a 10.17-inch digital gauge cluster and a 15.6-inch central infotainment touchscreen, both powered by a MediaTek MTK8676 4nm SoC. The center console contains an optional 9.5 L (0.34 cu ft) dual-compartment refrigerator with a temperature range of −5–50 °C (23–122 °F). It has a 20-speaker audio system and a 2.5 m^{2} (27 sq ft) panoramic sunroof. The front and outboard rear seats are equipped with heating, ventilation, and massaging functions. It has a 108 L (3.8 cu ft) frunk and a 656 L (23.2 cu ft) trunk, which expands to 1,770 L (63 cu ft) with the rear seats folded down.

The A06 uses an aluminium double wishbone front suspension and five-link multilink rear suspension. It has a turning radius of 5.5 m (18 ft).

It has an optional Changan Tianshu Level 2 ADAS system with a roof-mounted LiDAR sensor, 3 mmWave radars, 11 cameras and 12 ultrasonic sensors, powered by a single Horizon Robotics J6M SoC capable of 128 TOPS.

== Powertrain ==
The A06 is available with either a pure electric or range-extender powertrain.

The pure electric version is available with two rear-wheel drive powertrains. The standard variant uses a 161 hp (120 kW; 163 PS) motor outputting 190 N⋅m (140 lb⋅ft) of torque and uses 400 V power electronics paired with a 51.48 kWh LFP battery supplied by Gotion with a CLTC range rating of 510 km (317 mi). The high-power variant uses a 282 hp (210 kW; 286 PS) motor outputting 290 N⋅m (214 lb⋅ft) paired with a 63.18 kWh LFP pack also supplied by Gotion and uses 800 V SiC power electronics; this gives it a range of 630 km (391 mi) and allows it to get claimed 6C charge rates of 30–80% in 9 minutes, or 10–80% in 12 minutes (5C). It has a top speed of 188 km/h (117 mph) and a 0– [missing value] time of 6.2 seconds.

The range-extender version is equipped with a 1.5-liter naturally aspirated Atkinson cycle inline-four petrol engine which does not directly drive the wheels. The engine produces 94 hp (70 kW; 95 PS) and 125 N⋅m (92 lb⋅ft) of torque; it is equipped with port injection and has a compression ratio of 16:1. It shares the 161 hp (120 kW; 163 PS) motor with the standard electric variant, and is equipped with a 28.39 kWh LFP battery supplied by CATL and 400 V power electronics. This allows for a pure electric range of 180 and 240 km (112 and 149 mi) on the WLTP and CLTC cycles, respectively, a total CLTC range of 2,120 km (1,317 mi), and 3C charging with 10–80% in 18 minutes.

Specifications
Variant	Battery		Engine	Motor			Electric range		Total Range	10–80% DCFC time	Top speed	Weight
Variant	Spec	Supplier	Engine	Spec	Power	Torque	WLTP	CLTC	CLTC	10–80% DCFC time	Top speed	Weight
EV 510	51.48 kWh LFP 400 V	Gotion	—	ATDM04				510 km (317 mi)				1,750 kg (3,858 lb)
EV 630	63.18 kWh LFP 800 V	Gotion	—	ATDM04	282 hp (210 kW; 286 PS)	290 N⋅m (214 lb⋅ft)		630 km (391 mi)		12 min	188 km/h (117 mph)	1,887 kg (4,160 lb)
EREV	29.39 kWh LFP 400 V	CATL	1.5 L I4 94 hp (70 kW; 95 PS)	TZ180XS002	161 hp (120 kW; 163 PS)	190 N⋅m (140 lb⋅ft)	180 km (112 mi)	240 km (149 mi)	2,120 km (1,317 mi)	18 min	160 km/h (99 mph)	1,800 kg (3,968 lb)

== Sales ==
Year	China		
Year	EV	EREV	Total
2025	12,304	3,678	15,982
