= Changan Lamore =

Compact sedan

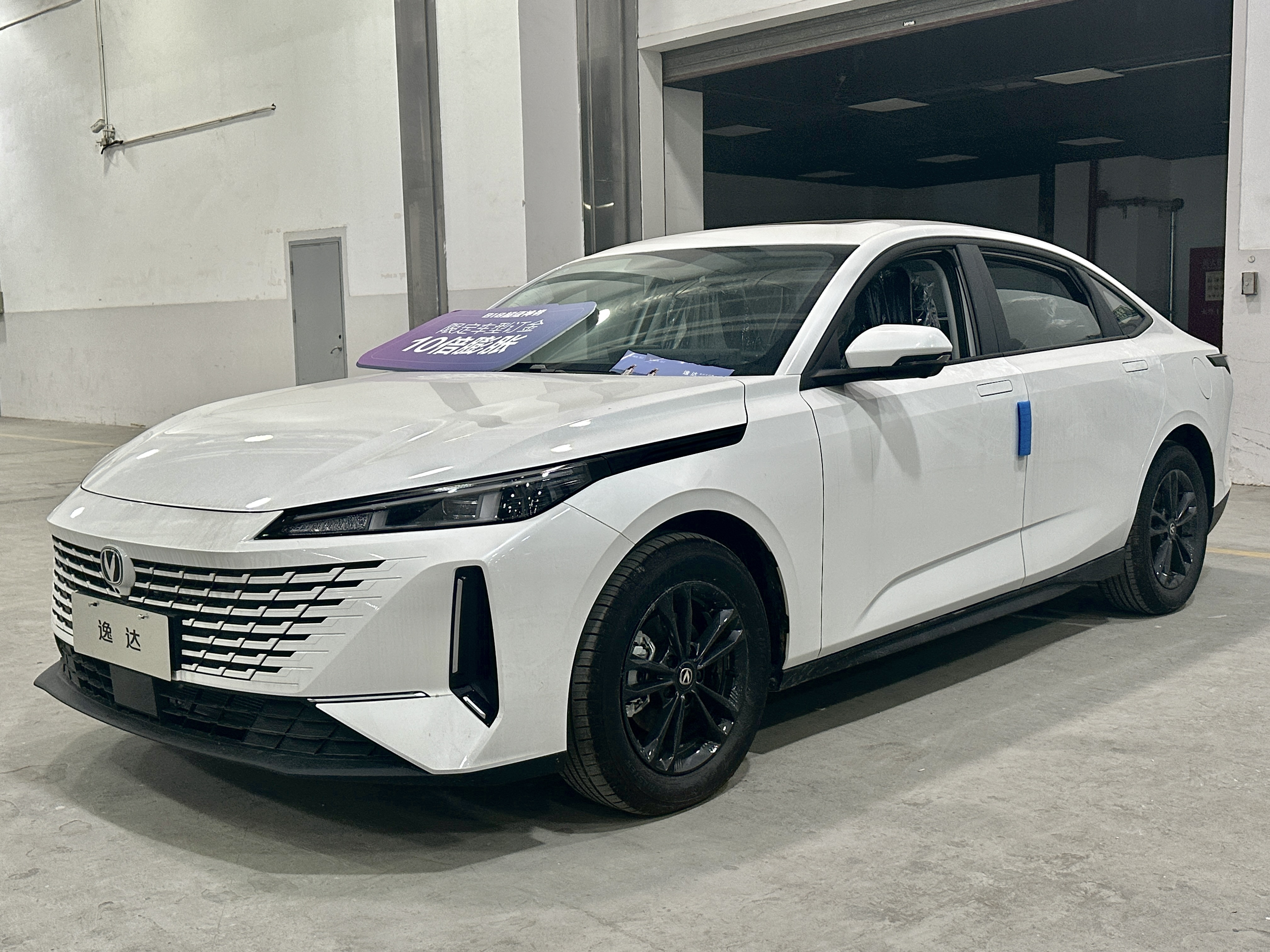

Overview
- Manufacturer: Changan
- Also called: Changan Nevo A05 (PHEV); Changan Eado (after renaming); Oshan 520 (2024); Changan UNI-L (Russia)
- Production: 2023–present (Lamore); 2024–present (Eado); 2023–2026 (Changan Nevo A05); 2024–present (Oshan 520)
- Assembly: China: Chongqing

Body and chassis
- Class: Compact car (C)
- Body style: 4-door sedan
- Layout: Front-engine, front-wheel-drive
- Platform: Ark platform

Powertrain
- Engine: Petrol: 1.5 L Blue Whale I4; Petrol PHEV: 1.5 L Blue Whale I4
- Electric motor: 140 kW (188 hp; 190 PS) or 158 kW (212 hp; 215 PS) permanent magnet (Changan Nevo A05)
- Transmission: 7-speed DCT
- Hybrid drivetrain: PHEV
- Battery: 9.07 kWh LFP; 18.99 kWh NMC

Dimensions
- Wheelbase: 2,765 mm (108.9 in)
- Length: 4,770 mm (187.8 in)
- Width: 1,840 mm (72.4 in)
- Height: 1,440 mm (56.7 in)
- Curb weight: 1,325–1,760 kg (2,921–3,880 lb)

The Changan Lamore (Chinese: 逸达) is a compact sedan produced by Chinese auto manufacturer Changan. It was renamed to the third-generation Changan Eado in March, 2024.

== Overview ==
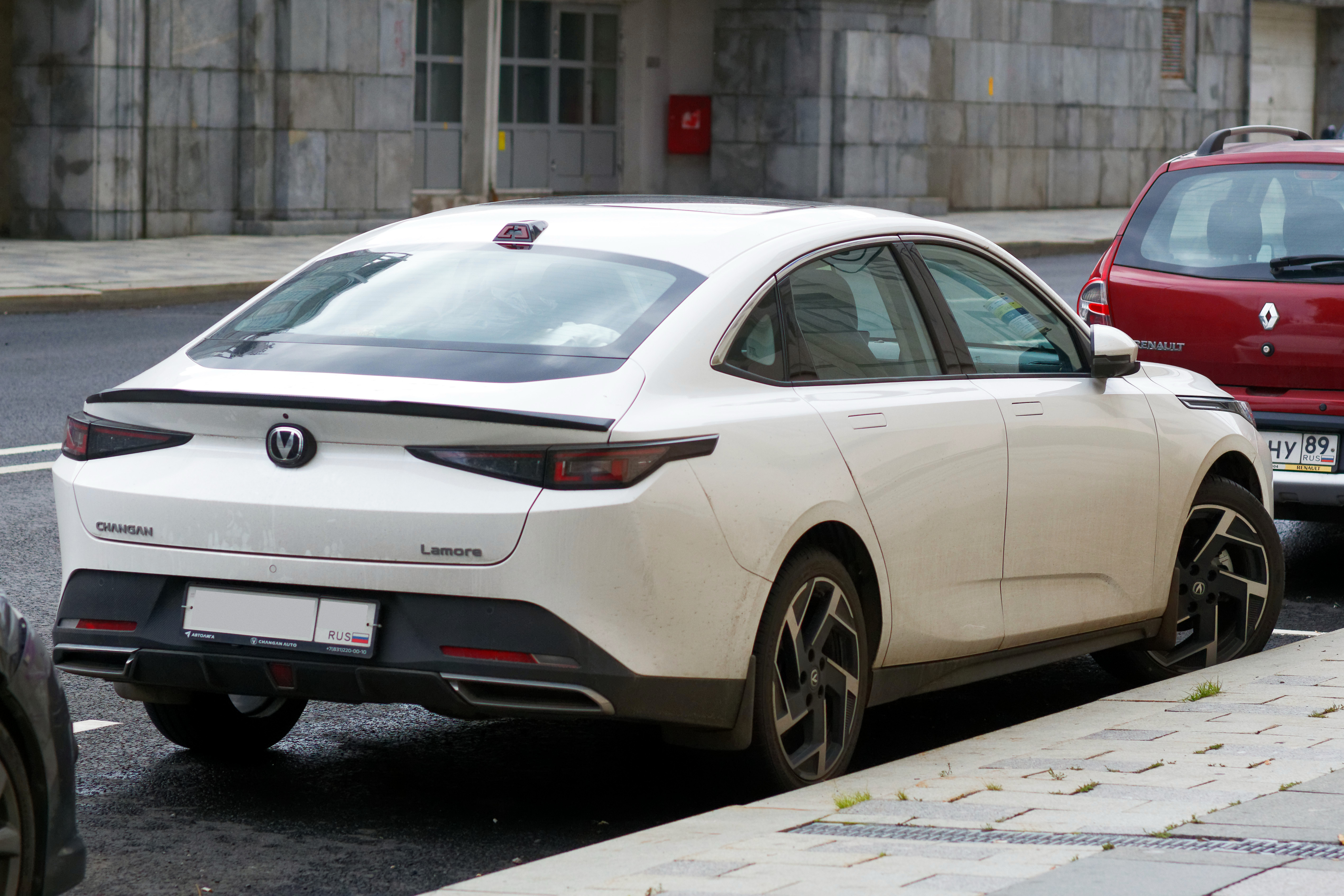
Rear view

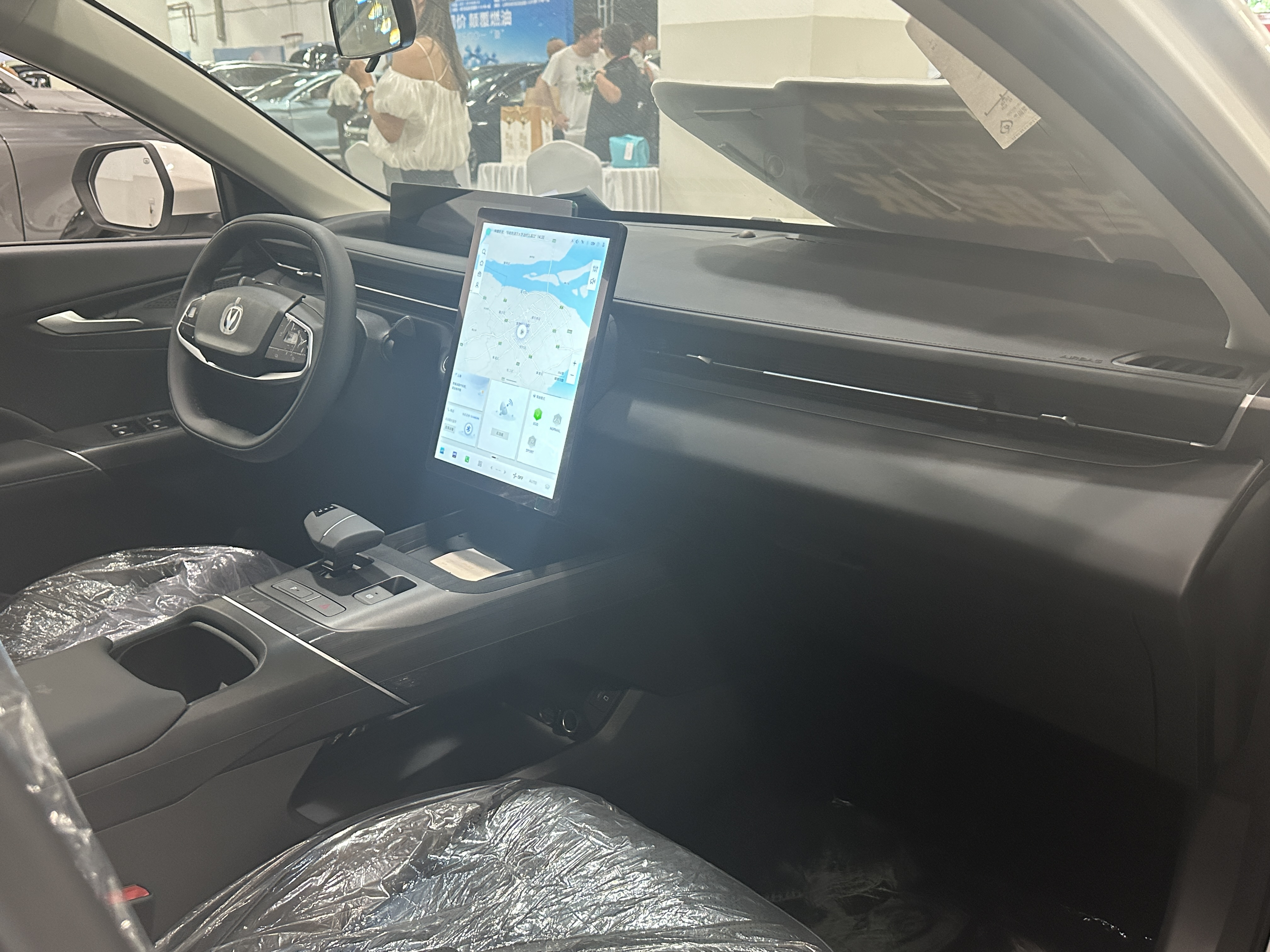
Interior

The Changan Lamore or Yida was launched on March 18, 2023. Positioned as a compact sedan, the model would sit just above the slightly smaller compact Eado sedan and below the UNI-V. The Lamore is the second car of Changan Automobile's Ark architecture following the UNI-V compact sedan.

The Lamore features powered pop-out exterior door handles. The exterior trunk release button is integrated into the Changan emblem.

The interior of the Lamore features a flat bottom steering wheel, a 13.2-inch portrait central infotainment screen and a 10.25-inch instrument panel. The displays are powered by an 8-core Mediatek 8666 SoC, which runs iFlytek Feiyu 4.0 infotainment software. The Lamore is also the first mass-produced model in China to have Ernie Bot, Baidu's version of ChatGPT on board.

The Changan Lamore is powered by a Changan Blue Whale 1.5-liter turbocharged petrol engine producing 170 hp (130 kW; 170 PS) and 260 N⋅m (190 lb⋅ft) of torque. The engine is paired with a 7-speed dual-clutch transmission. The top speed is limited to 200 km/h (120 mph) with a WLTC fuel consumption of 5.99 L/100 km (39.3 mpg_{‑US}).

In March 2024, Changan revealed the third generation Eado, which is a rebadged Changan Lamore.

== Oshan 520 ==
A battery-electric version of the Eado/Lamore capable of battery swapping sold under the Oshan marque was launched in November 2024 called the Oshan 520. The 520 features the same front fascia as the regular Eado/Lamore, but is 30 mm (1.2 in) taller, has a different rear trunklid, and wider LED taillights. It is based on the Changan Nevo A05, and is the first vehicle to use CATL's second generation Choco-SEB swappable battery packs. It is powered by a 105 kW (141 hp; 143 PS) motor and has a CLTC range rating of 515 kilometres (320 mi). According to Changan, the battery pack can be swapped in two minutes. It has a curb weight of 1,535 kg (3,384 lb) and a top speed of 135 km/h (84 mph).

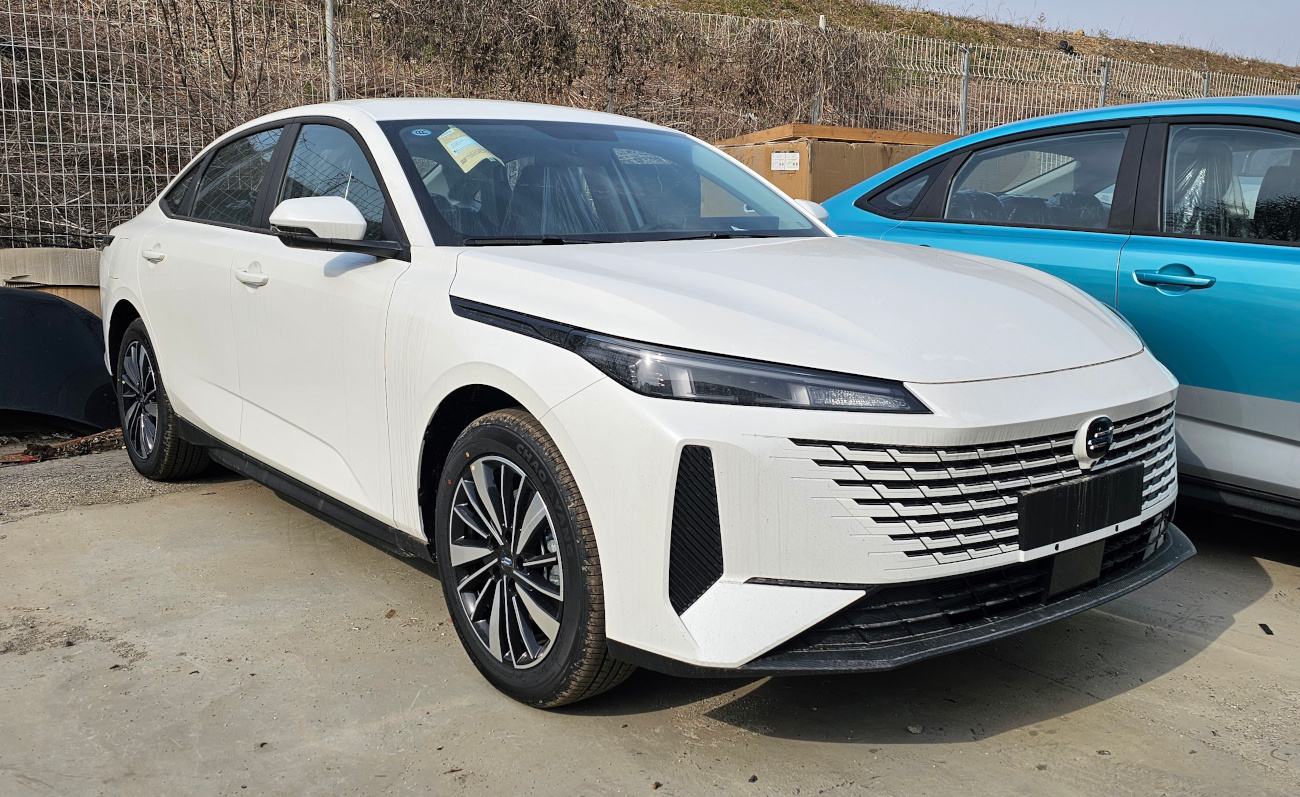
Oshan 520

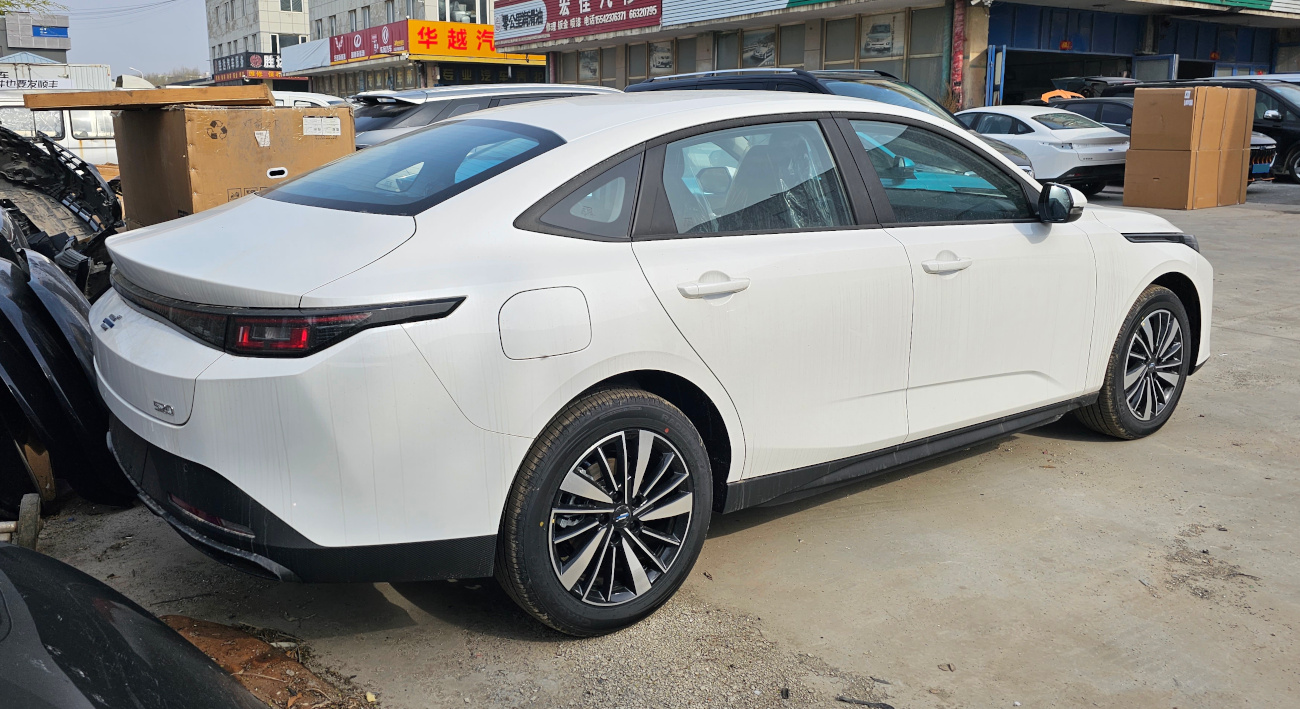
Rear view

== Changan Nevo A05 ==
The Changan Nevo A05 is a PHEV variant of the Lamore sold under Changan Nevo (长安启源). The A05 features restyled front and rear bumper compared to the original Lamore sedan, and is only offered as a plug-in hybrid vehicle. The A05 was launched in October 2023 with powertrains consisting of a 1.5-liter engine producing 81 kW (109 hp; 110 PS) and a selection of two different electric motors with the low output motor producing 140 kW (190 hp; 190 PS) and high output motor developing 158 kW (212 hp; 215 PS). The A05 could be had with either lithium iron phosphate batteries or ternary lithium batteries.

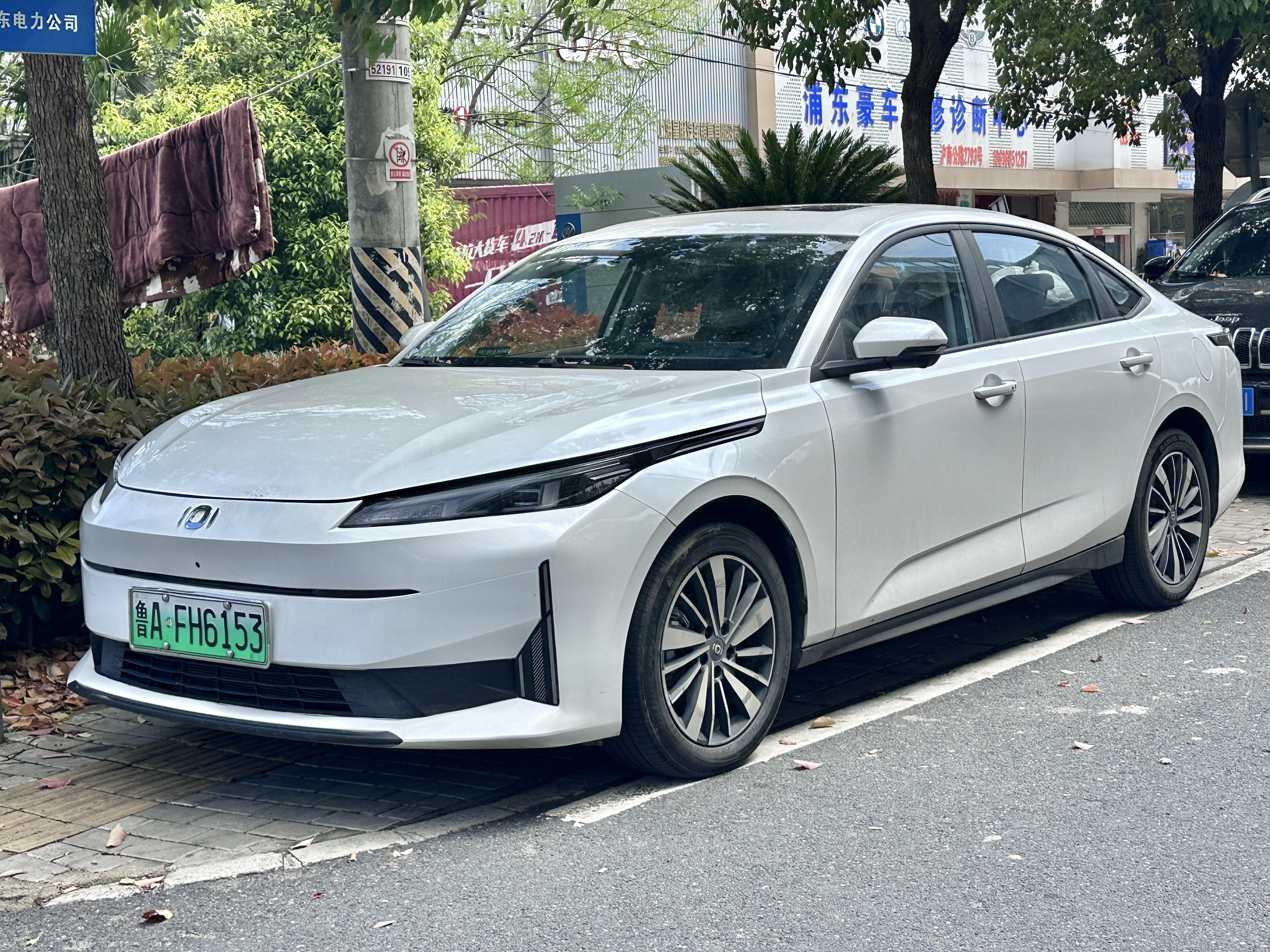
Changan Nevo A05

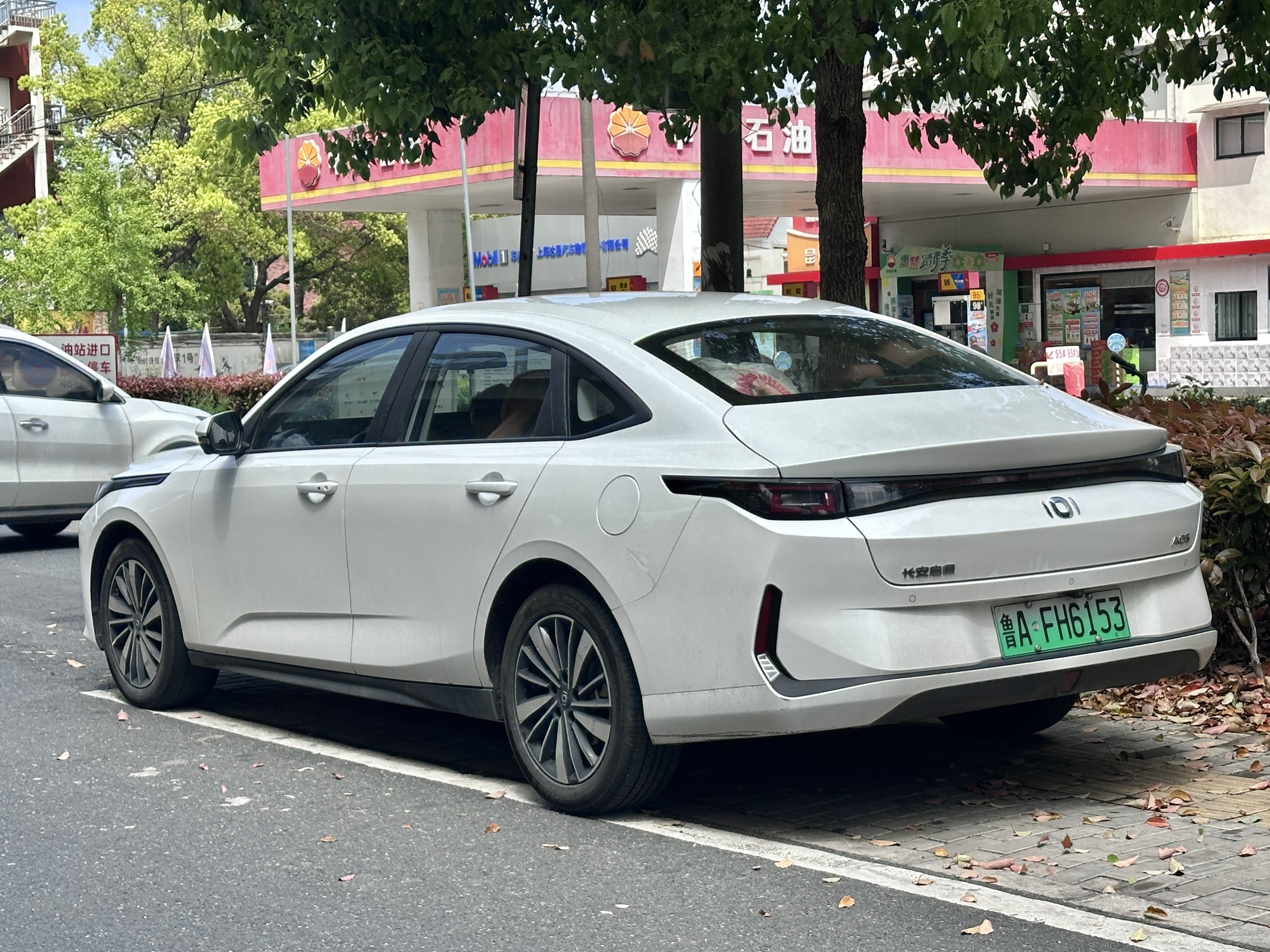
Rear view

== Sales ==
| Year | China | | Total production | |
| Year | Lamore | A05 | Lamore | A05 |
|---|---|---|---|---|
| 2023 | 43,959 | 5,025 | 54,670 | 13,253 |
| 2024 | 13,243 | 36,951 | 15,802 | 38,767 |
| 2025 | 47 | 10,411 | 11,153 | 10,682 |
