= Changan CS15 =

Chinese subcompact crossover SUV

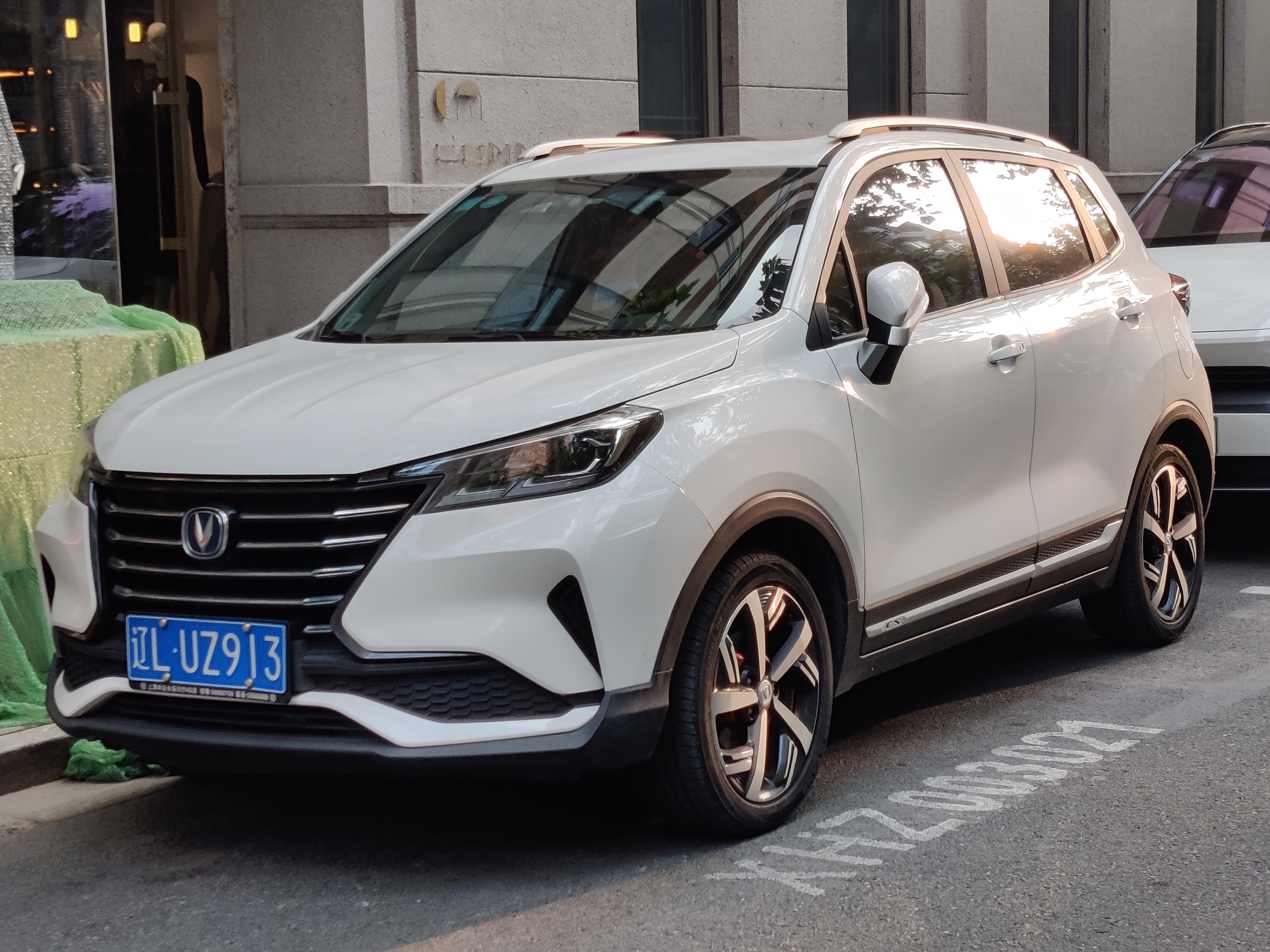
- Changan CS15 Plus

Overview
- Manufacturer: Changan Automobile
- Also called: Changan CS15 Plus; Changan CS35 Mini; Oshan COS3°
- Production: 2015–2023
- Model years: 2016–2023
- Assembly: China: Chongqing

Body and chassis
- Class: Subcompact crossover SUV (B)
- Body style: 5-door SUV
- Layout: Front-engine, front-wheel-drive

Powertrain
- Engine: Petrol: 1.5 L JL473QF I4 (petrol)
- Transmission: 5-speed manual 5-speed DCT

Dimensions
- Wheelbase: 2,510 mm (98.8 in)
- Length: 4,100 mm (161.4 in); 4,135 mm (162.8 in) (facelift)
- Width: 1,740 mm (68.5 in)
- Height: 1,635 mm (64.4 in)

Chronology
- Predecessor: Changan CX20

The Changan CS15 is a subcompact crossover SUV produced by Changan Automobile positioned under the similar-sized Changan CS35.

== Overview ==
The Changan CS15 debuted on the 2015 Guangzhou Auto Show with prices ranging from 53,900 yuan to 75,400 yuan and the official market launch in March 2016.

The Changan CS15 is powered by a 1.5 liter inline-4 with about 120 hp, mated to a six-speed manual transmission or a six-speed automatic transmission.

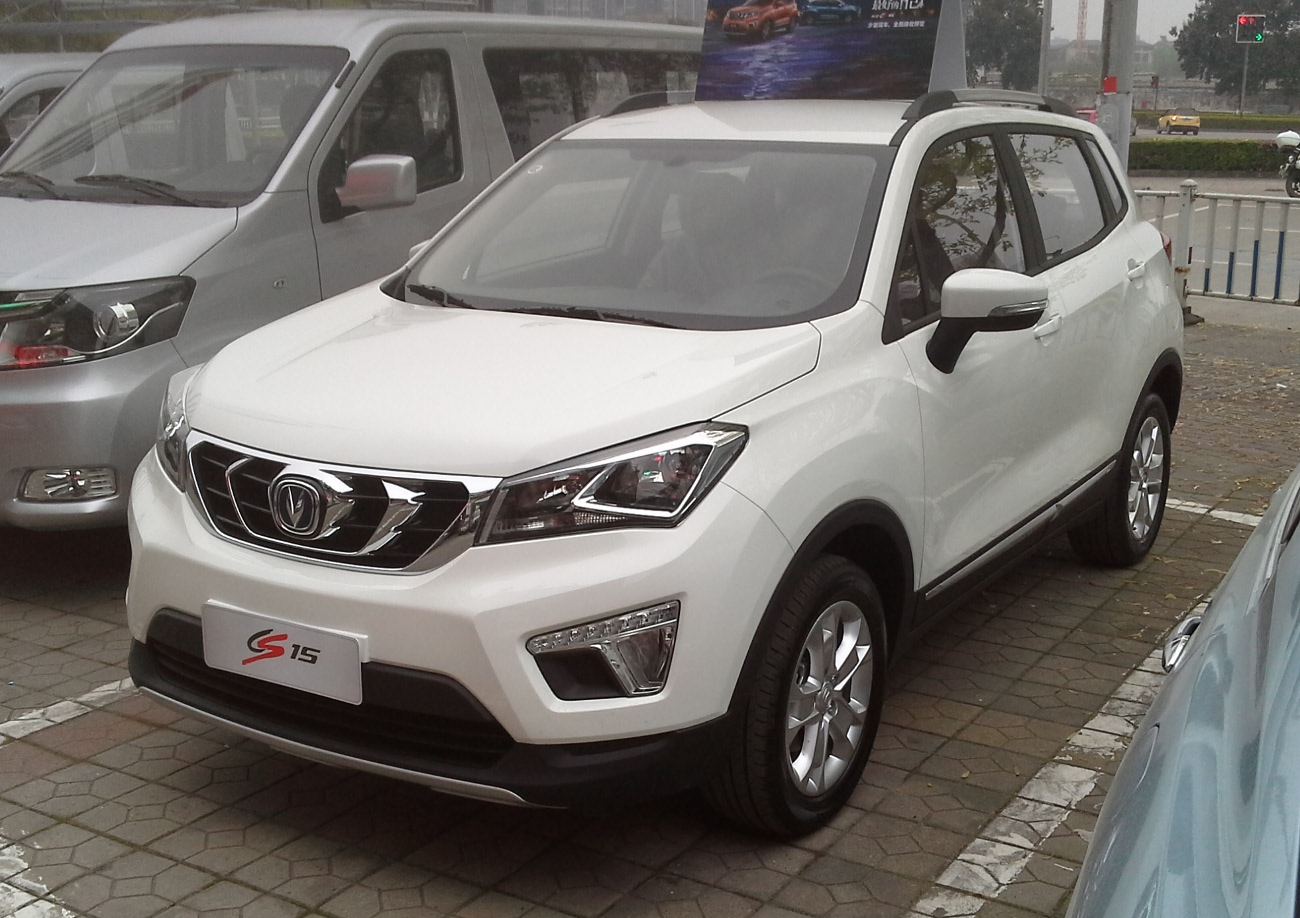
Changan CS15 (pre-facelift) front

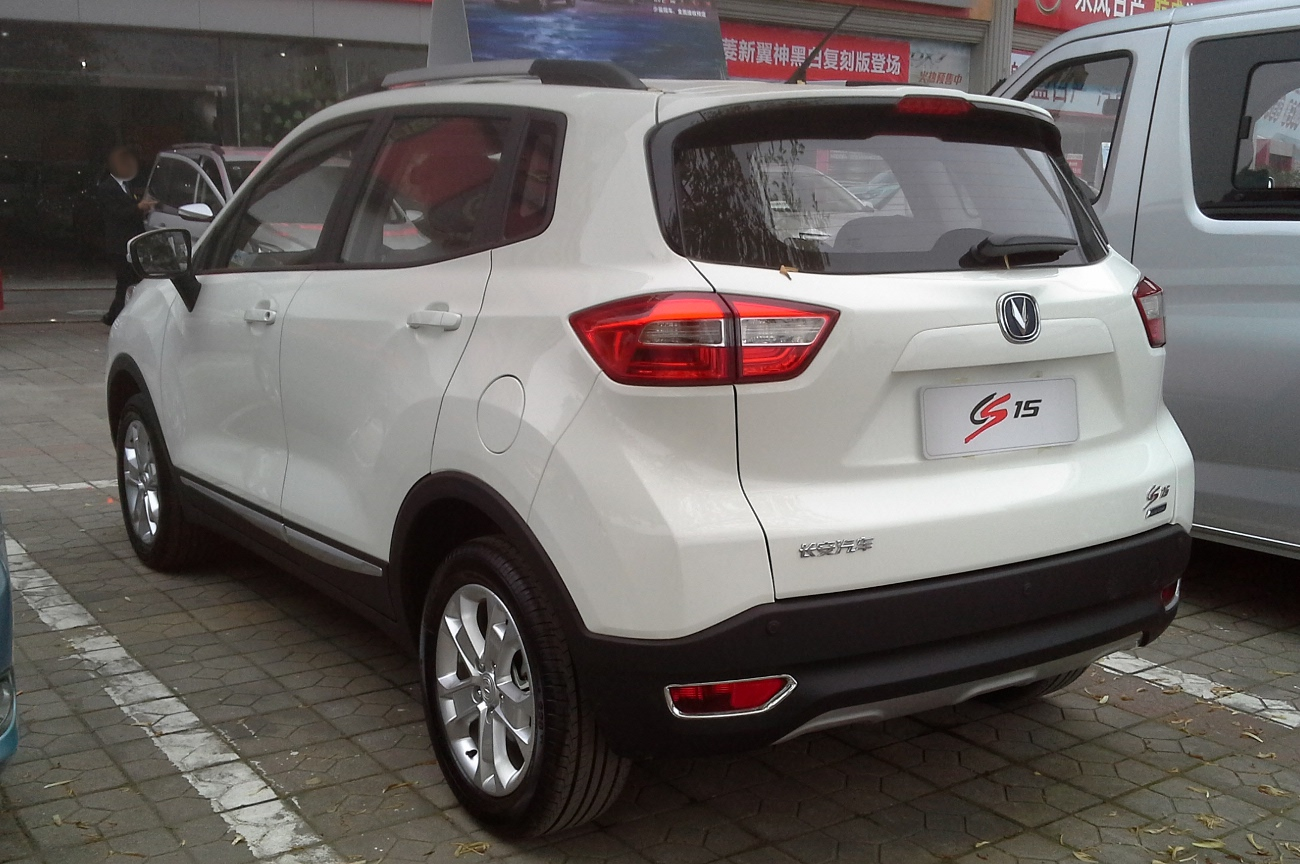
Changan CS15 (pre-facelift) rear

== 2019 facelift ==
The Changan CS15 received a facelift in 2019 with prices ranging from 55,900 yuan to 78,900 yuan and the official market launch in March 2019. The post-facelift model is sold as the Changan CS15 in Egypt and the Philippines, and as the Changan CS15 Plus and Changan CS35 Mini in China and Changan CS15 Pro in export markets.

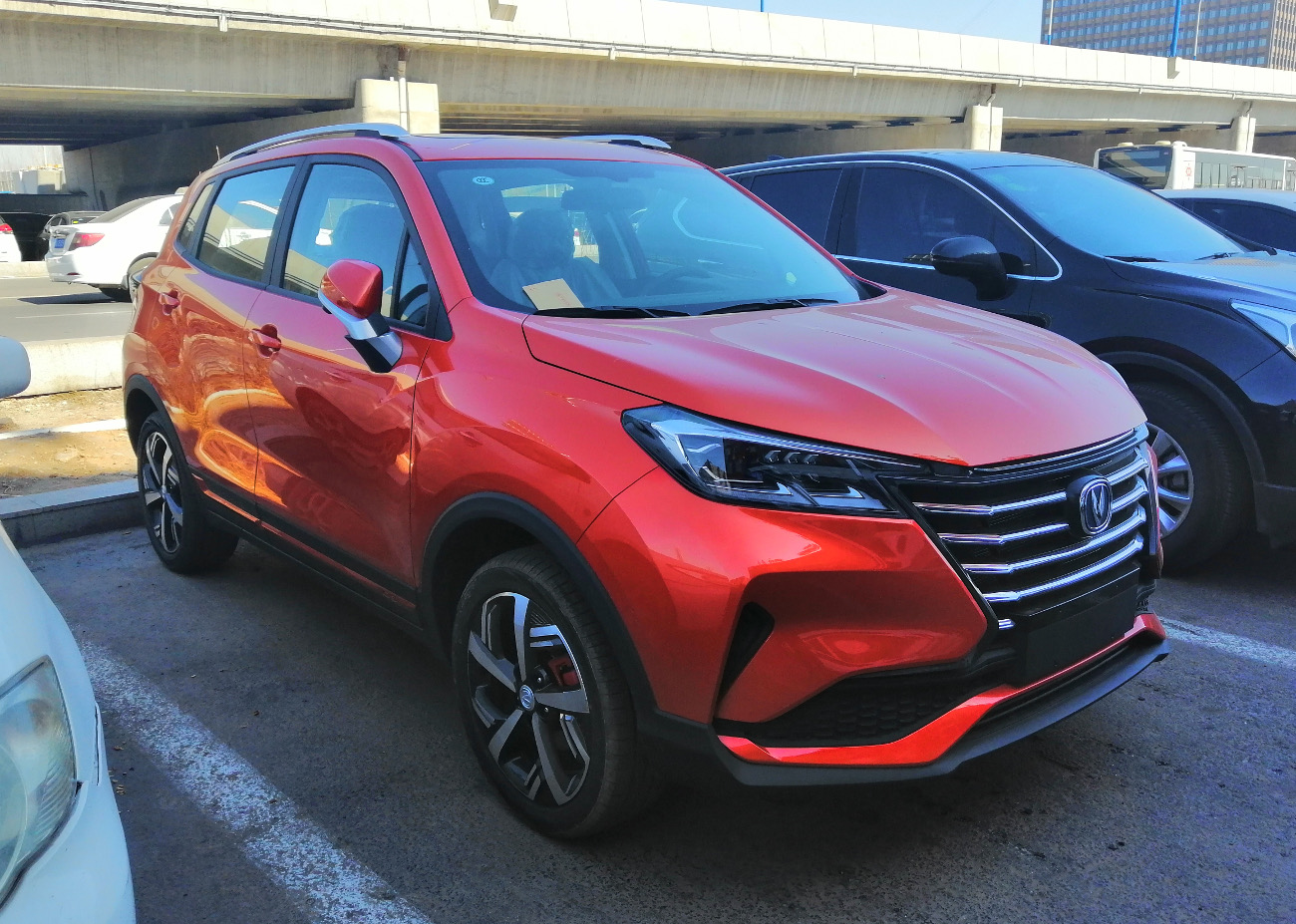
Changan CS15 (facelift) front

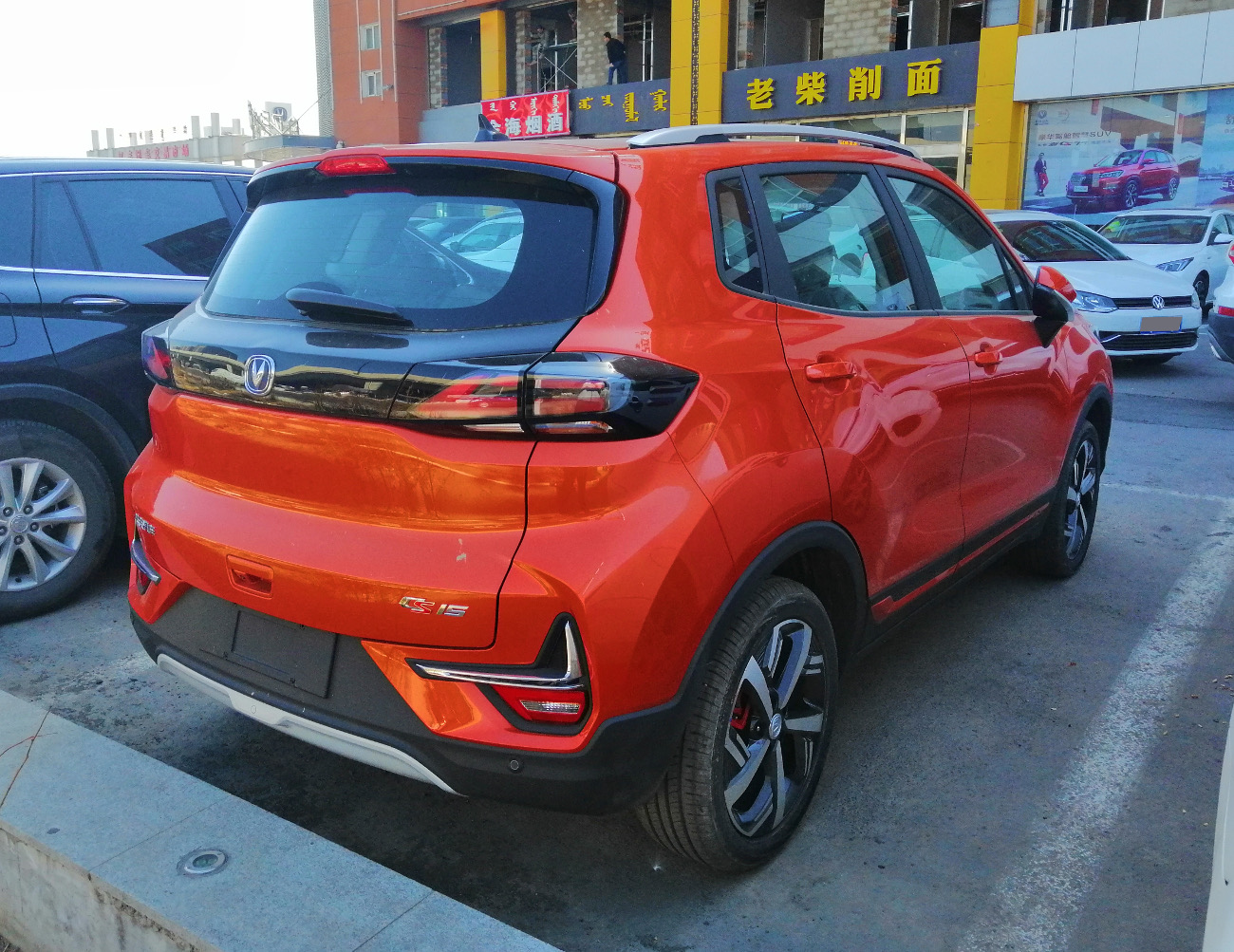
Changan CS15 (facelift) rear

== Changan CS15 EV ==
The Changan CS15 EV is an electric car based on the Changan CS15 subcompact crossover SUV. Power of the Changan CS15 EV comes from an electric motor producing 75 hp and 170 nm of torque, setting a 110 km/h top speed and a range of 300 kilometers. According to the official website, the prices of the Changan CS15 EV ranges from 189,400 yuan to 196,400 yuan.

== Changan CS15 E-Pro ==
The Changan CS15 E-Pro was revealed at the 2019 World Intelligent Network Automotive Conference and the 7th China International New Energy and Intelligent Networking Automotive Exhibition (IEEVChina 2019). It is essentially the facelift of the Changan CS15 EV with performance improvements included. The CS15 E-Pro is powered by an E-motor with maximum power of 120 kW (160 hp). The power battery capacity is 48.3 kWh. The Changan CS15 E-Pro was officially listed for sale in November 2019.

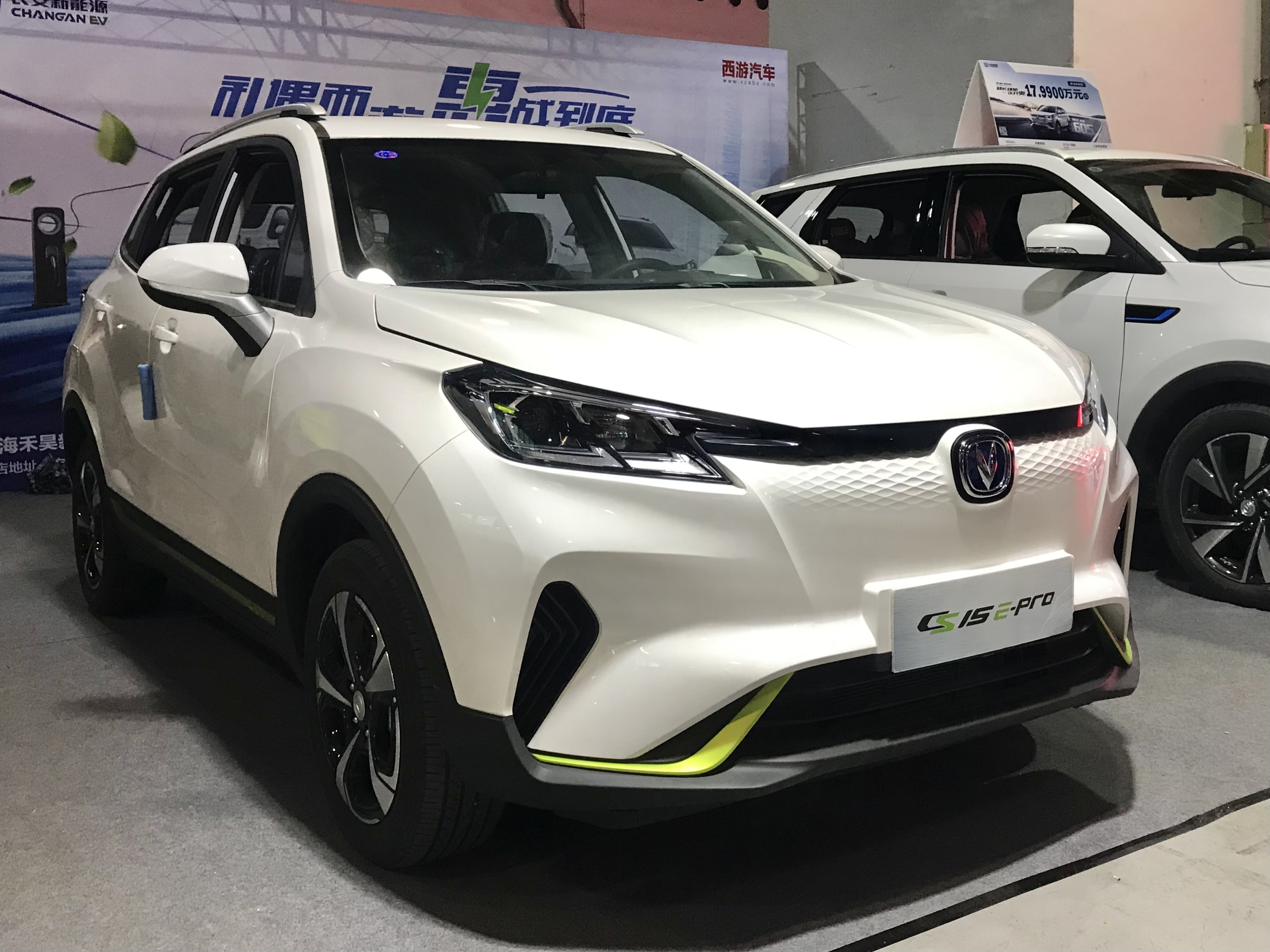
Changan CS15 E-Pro front

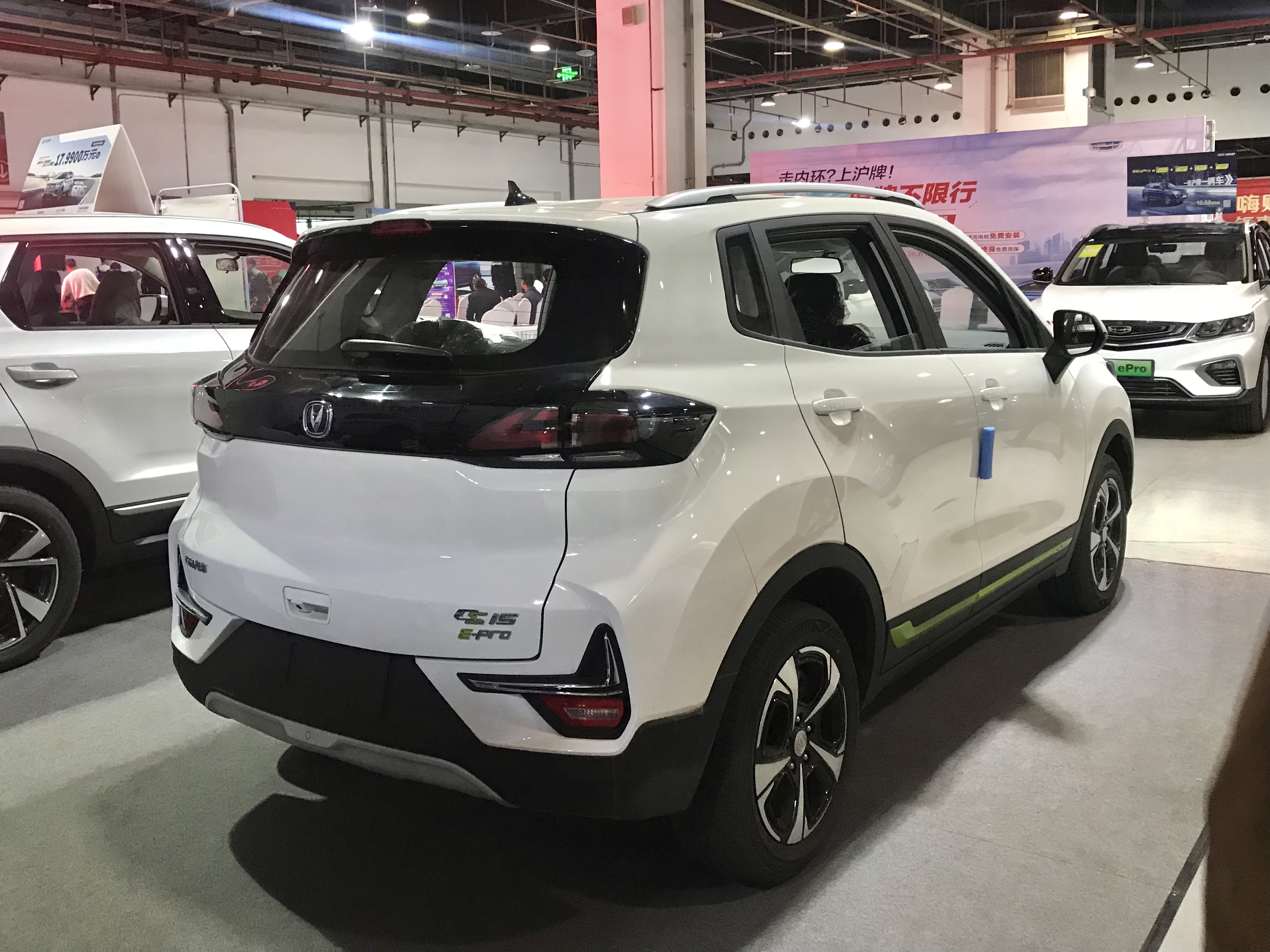
Changan CS15 E-Pro rear

== Oshan COS3° ==
The Oshan COS3°, pronounced as Oshan Kesai 3, is a rebadged variant of the Changan CS15 Plus sold under the Oshan brand. In addition to the redesign of the front face, the Oshan COS3° is basically identical to the Changan CS15 Plus. The COS3° is equipped with the same powertrain as Changan CS15, which is a 1.5 liter naturally aspirated engine with a maximum power of 78.5 kW (105 hp), mated to a DCT and manual gearbox from the same power combination on the Changan CS15.

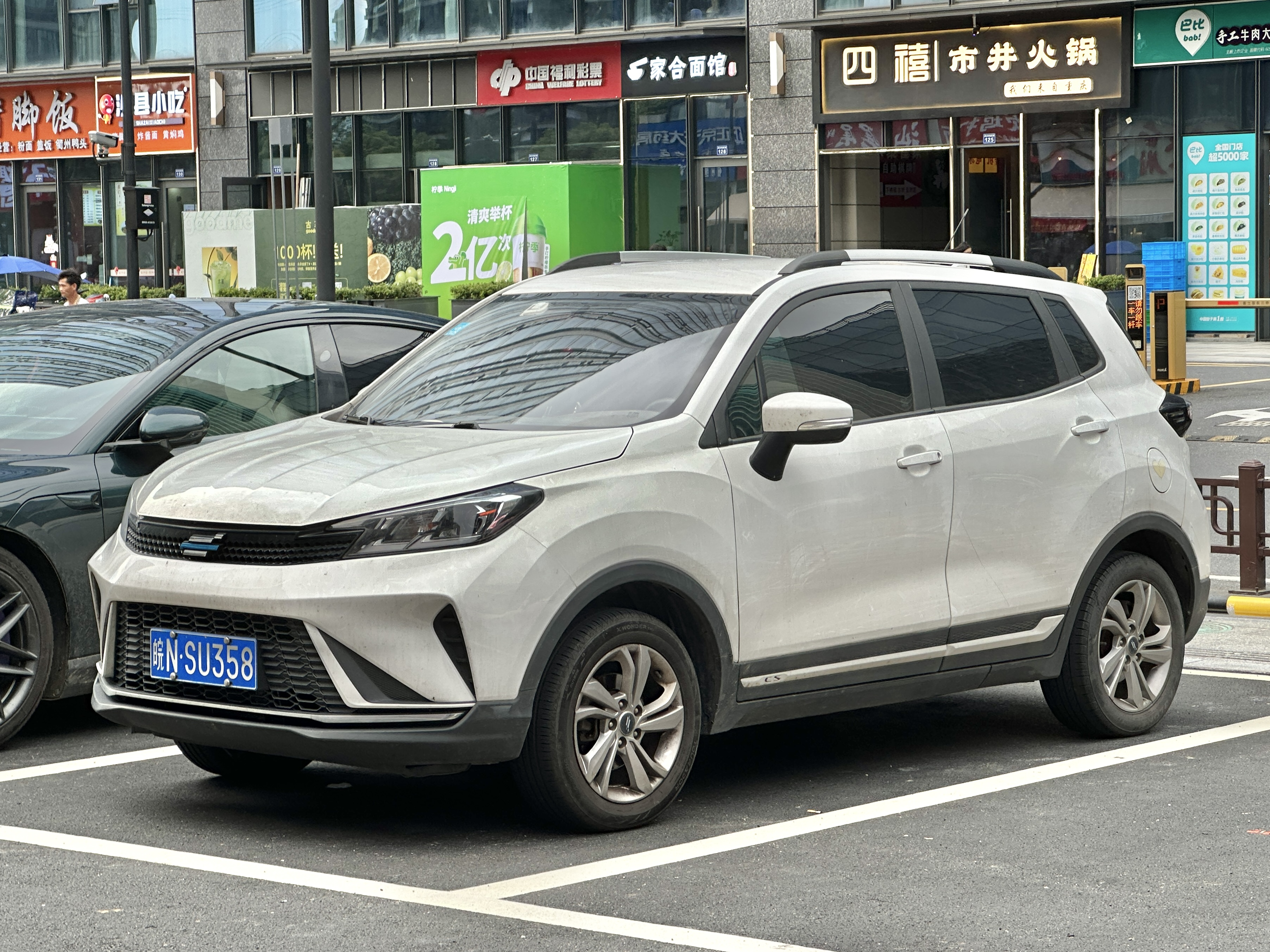
Oshan COS3° front

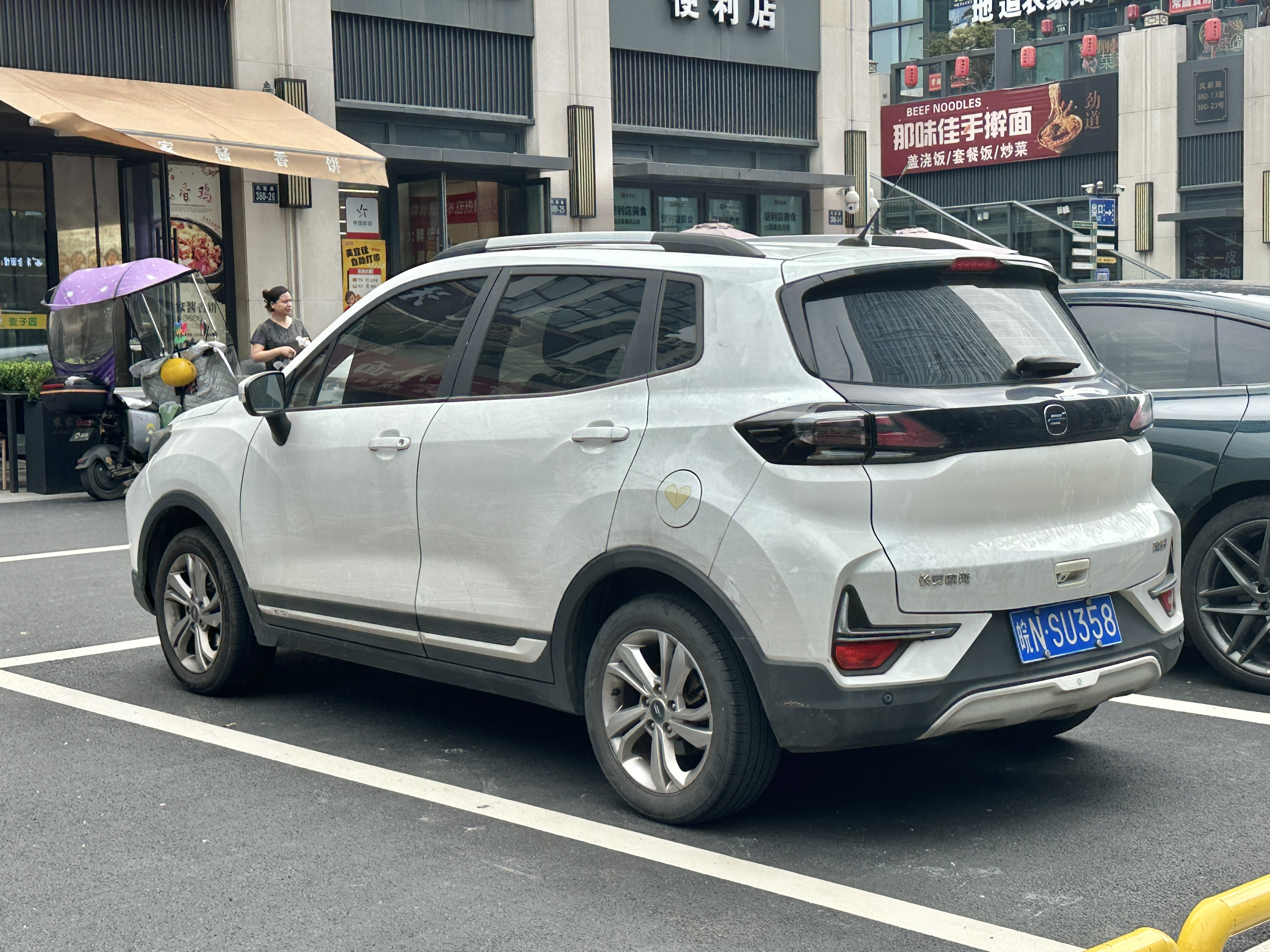
Oshan COS3° rear
