= Changan CX20 =

Chinese mini MPV

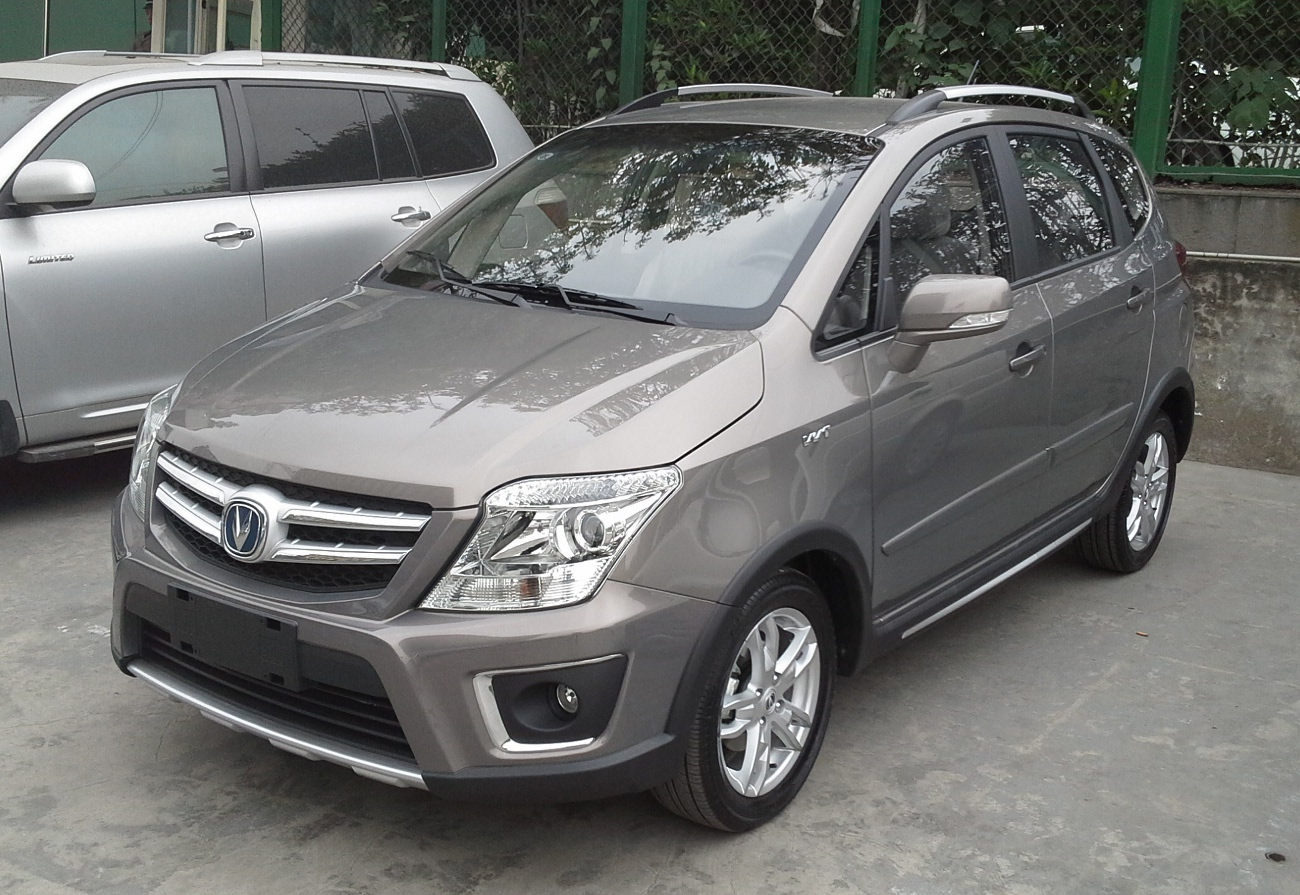
- Changan CX20 facelift

Overview
- Manufacturer: Changan Automobile
- Also called: Changan CX20 Cross; Youngman Lotus CX20; Lark Q1; Changan CS1 (Chile); Rayen R3 (Iran)
- Production: 2010–2016
- Model years: 2010–2016

Body and chassis
- Class: mini MPV
- Body style: 5-door hatchback
- Layout: Front-engine, front-wheel-drive

Powertrain
- Engine: 1.3 L JL474QL I4 (petrol) (Before 2013); 1.4 L EA14 I4 (petrol) (After 2013)
- Transmission: 5-speed manual 4-speed automatic (Before 2013); 5-speed automatic (After 2013)

Dimensions
- Wheelbase: 2,450 mm (96.5 in)
- Length: 3,970 mm (156.3 in)(CX20 Cross)
- Width: 1,730 mm (68.1 in)(CX20 Cross)
- Height: 2,450 mm (96.5 in)(CX20 Cross)

Chronology
- Successor: Youngman Lotus CX20; Changan CS15

The Changan CX20 is a mini MPV produced by Changan Automobile.

== Overview ==
Pricing for the CX20 starts at 49,900 yuan and ends at 70,900 yuan with a 1.3 liter four-cylinder engine producing 86hp. A facelifted CX20 was revealed during the 2013 Shanghai Auto Show with a new 1.4 liter engine producing 101hp and prices ranging from 55,900 yuan to 64,900 yuan.

== CX20 Cross ==
The Changan CX20 Cross is a crossover version of the regular Changan CX20. It debuted during the 2010 Chongqing Auto Show in Chongqing, China, where Changan Automobile's headquarters is based.

== Gallery ==
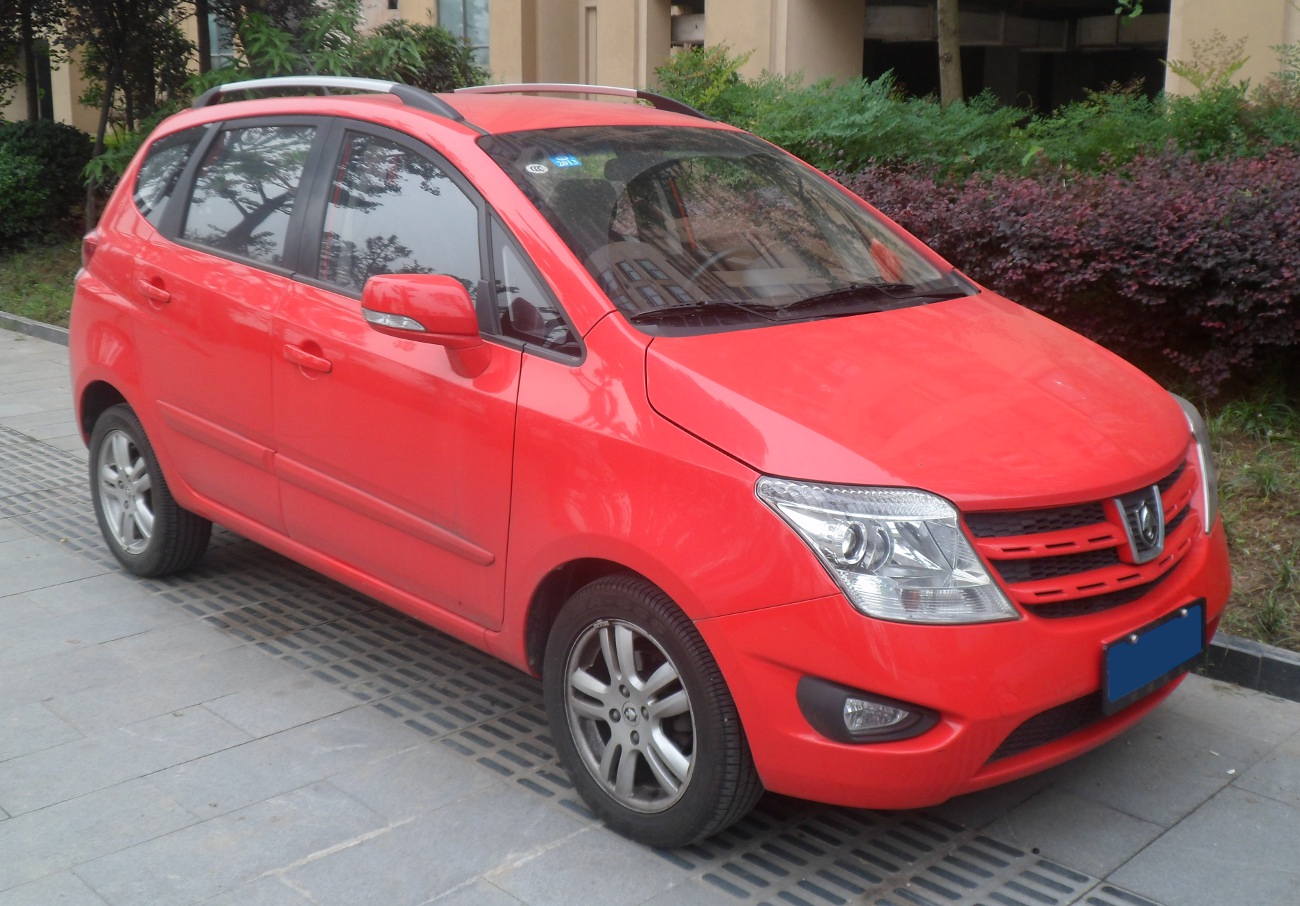
Changan CX20 front.

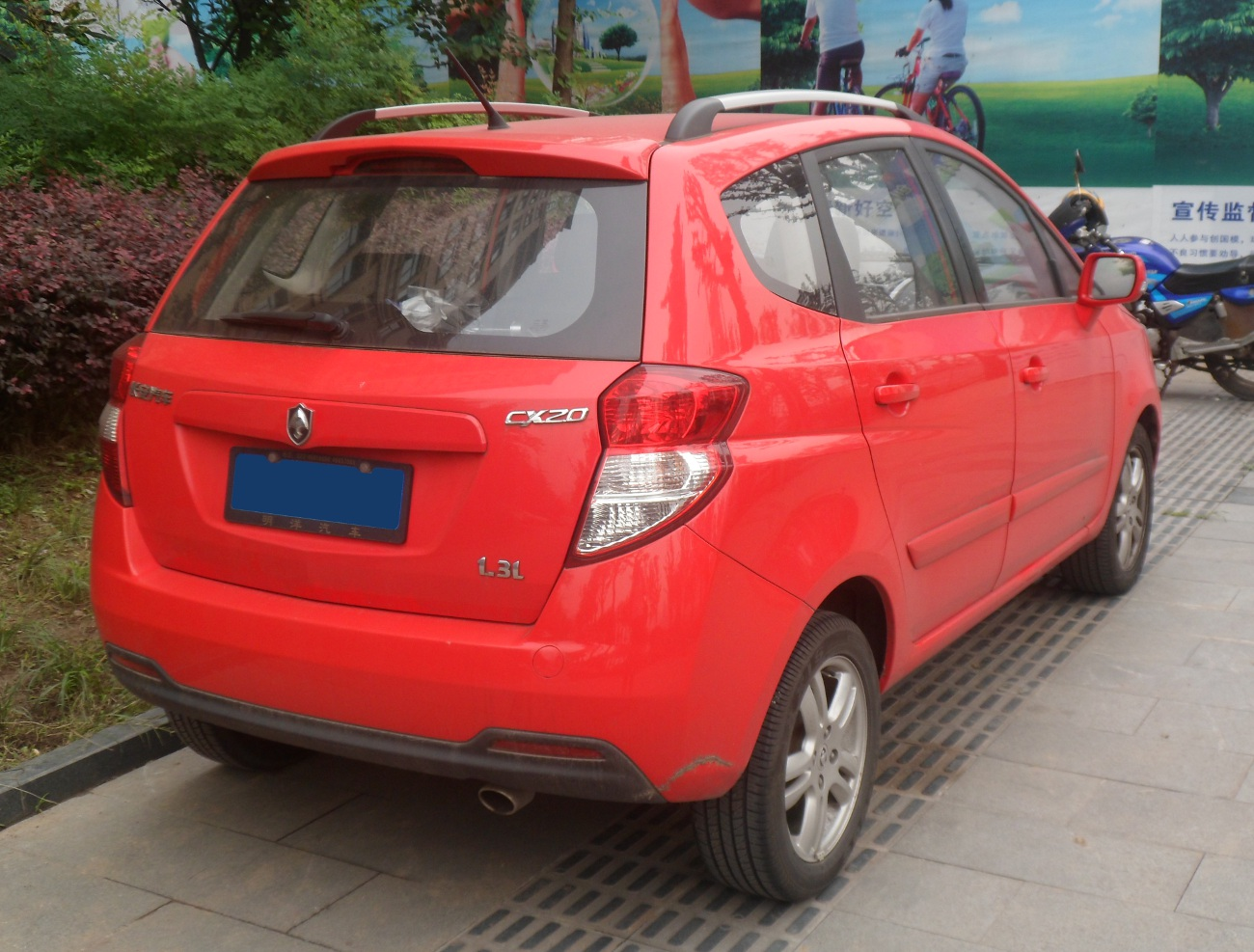
Changan CX20 rear.

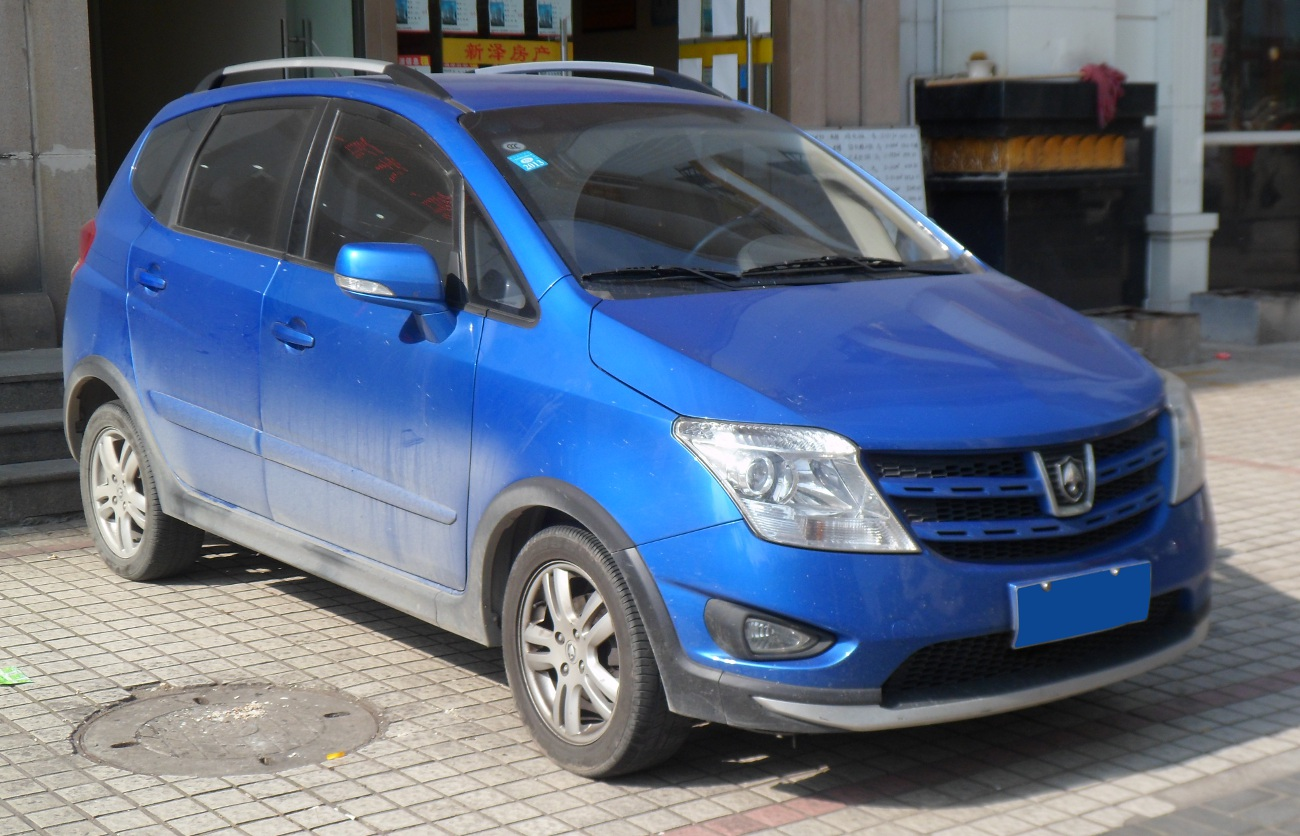
Changan CX20 Cross front.

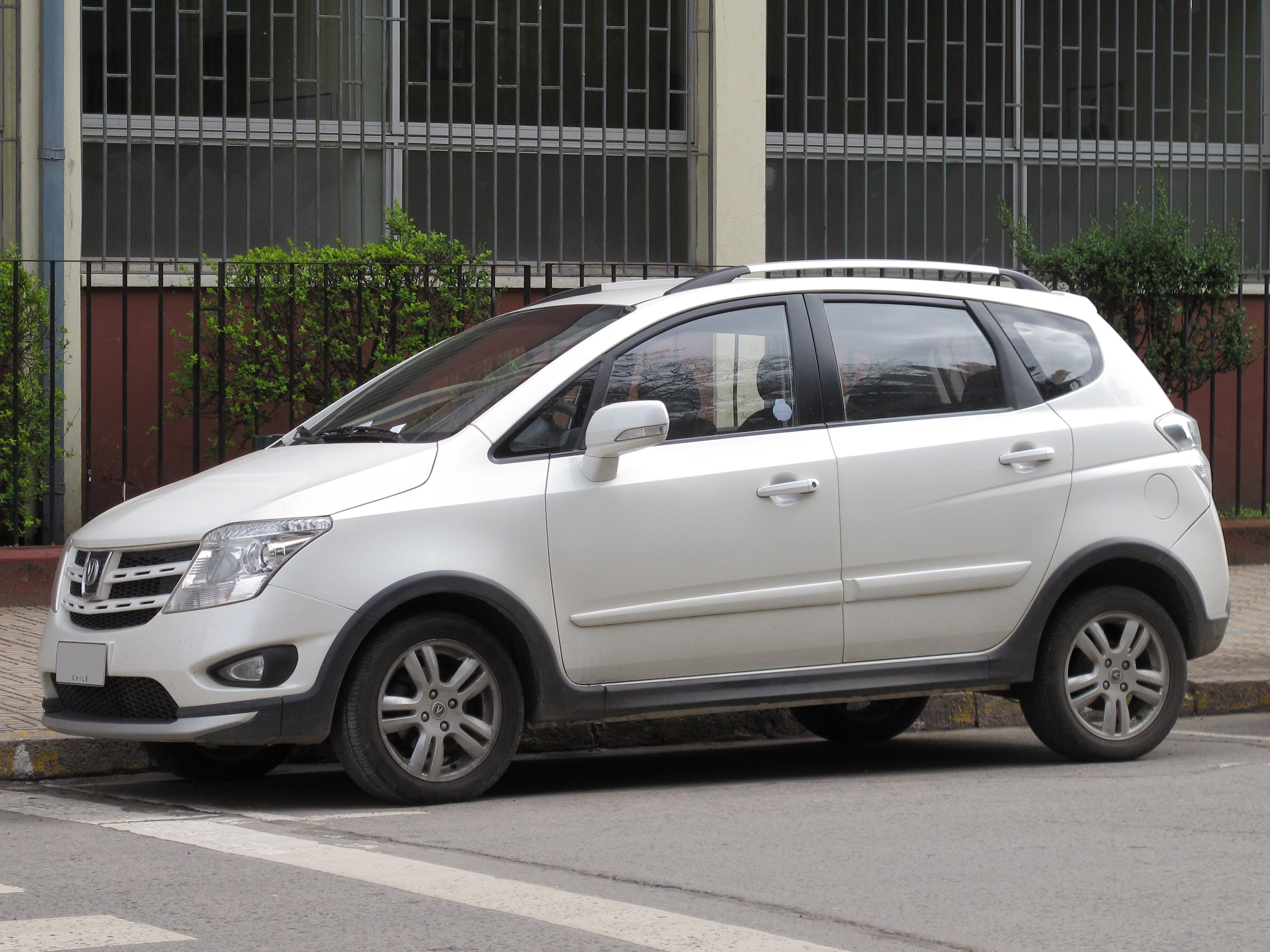
Changan CS1 front (Chile).

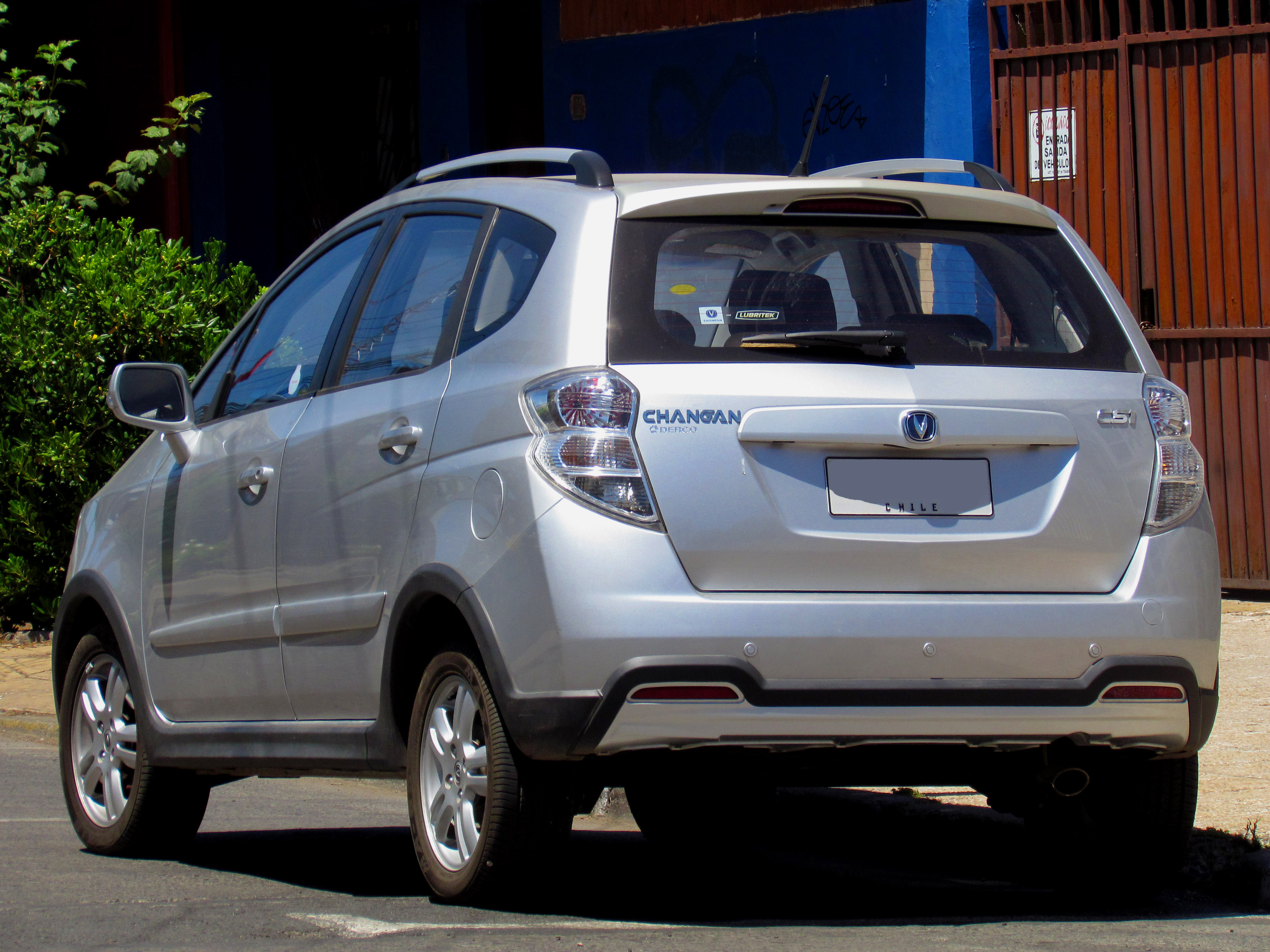
Changan CS1 rear (Chile).
