= Allview =

Romanian electronics re-branded cheap asian products

- Product type: Consumer electronics
- Current owner: Visual Fan
- Country: Romania
- Introduced: 2002
- Website: allview.ro

Allview is a Romanian brand of electronics. It was founded in 2002 and is owned by the Visual Fan company, based in Braşov, Romania. Its main products include smartphones, tablets, notebooks, smart TVs and accessories. Its phones are manufactured in China by various OEM partners. Allview was ranked second in the Romanian smartphones market share at the end of 2015, behind Samsung and ahead of Huawei. Its parent company had a turnover of € 68.2 million at the end of 2016, and its owner and CEO is Lucian Peticilă.

== Notable products ==
In September 2017, the brand launched the Allview X4 Soul Infinity smartphone, which introduced the first virtual assistant that supports the Romanian language, called AVI.

In June 2018, the brand launched the Allview X5 Soul Pro smartphone, its first model to feature rounded screen corners and a dual camera.

In December 2023, Visual Fan launched the Allview Auto business line together with the CityZEN model, being the first product.

In August 2014, the brand launched the Allview Impera I smartphone, being the first Windows Phone device made by a romanian company.
