= Qishi =

Qishi may refer to:

- Qishi, Dongguan, Guangdong, China, a town
- BAW Qishi, a 2009–2014 Chinese compact SUV
- Li Qishi (born 1998), Chinese speed-skater
- Naito Ehara (江原 騎士, pinyin: Jiāngyuán Qíshì; born 1993), Japanese competitive swimmer
