= 212 X03 =

Mid-size SUV

Overview
- Manufacturer: BAW
- Production: 2026 (to commence)
- Assembly: China

Body and chassis
- Class: Mid-size SUV
- Body style: 5-door SUV
- Platform: Xpedition

Powertrain
- Engine: Diesel: 2.3 L DDi23-500B turbo I4; Petrol PHEV: 2.0 L I4

Dimensions
- Wheelbase: 2,950 mm (116.1 in)
- Length: 5,095 mm (200.6 in)
- Width: 2,038 mm (80.2 in)
- Height: 1,945 mm (76.6 in)
- Curb weight: 2,570 kg (5,666 lb)

The 212 X03 is a mid-size SUV manufactured by BAW under the 212 brand.

== Overview ==
The X03 was first revealed on 7 August 2026 in MIIT regulatory filings. It is a five-seater vehicle.

== Specifications ==
The X03 has ground clearance of 235 mm (9.3 in) with approach and departure angles of 33° and 30° respectively. It is built on a body-on-frame platform. It has 18-inch wheels, a full-size spare wheel mounted to the double-door tailgate, and maximum towing capacity of 2,500 kg (2.5 t; 5,500 lb).

== Powertrain ==
The X03 is available with a 2.3-liter turbodiesel outputting 188 hp (140 kW; 191 PS) (185 hp (138 kW; 188 PS) net power) and has a top speed of 170 km/h (106 mph).
