= BAW Luba =

Chinese full-size SUV

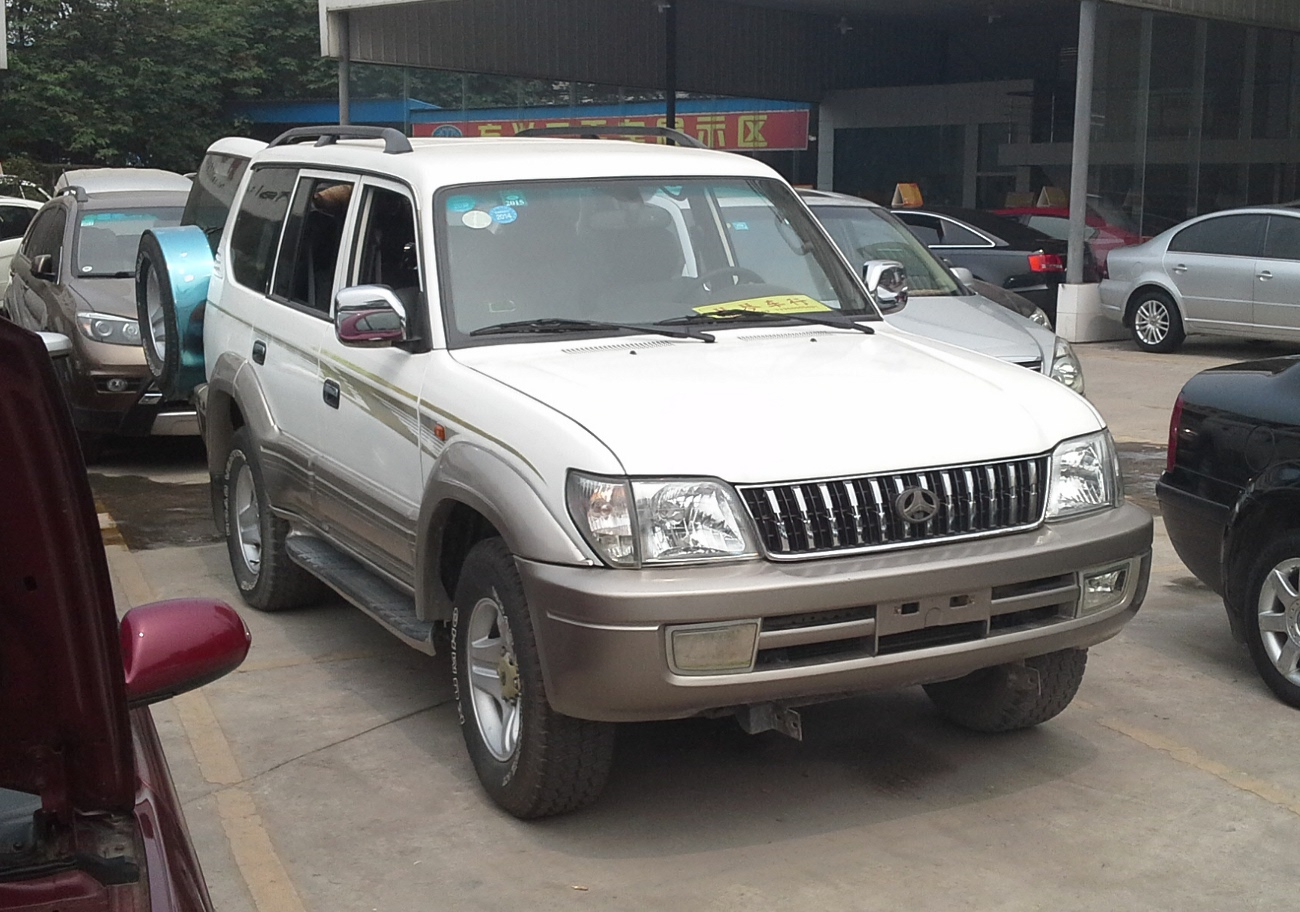

Overview
- Manufacturer: BAW
- Also called: BAW BJ1021 (pickup); BAW BJ2032; BAW Land King (Russia); BAW Luba S100 (since 2009); BAW Youxian; BAW Yueling (pickup)
- Production: 2001–2017
- Model years: 2002–2017

Body and chassis
- Class: Full-size SUV; Full-size pickup truck (Yueling)
- Body style: 5-door SUV; 4-door pickup truck (Yueling)
- Layout: Front-engine, four-wheel drive
- Related: Toyota 4Runner/Hilux Surf (N180); Toyota Land Cruiser Prado (J90)

Powertrain
- Engine: Petrol: 2.4 L 2RZ-FE I4; 2.4 L G4CA I4; 2.7 L 3RZ-FE I4; 2.2 L I4 (Yueling); Diesel: 2.8 L turbo I4 (Yueling)
- Transmission: 5-speed manual

Dimensions
- Wheelbase: 2,675 mm (105.3 in)
- Length: 4,795 mm (188.8 in)
- Width: 1,835 mm (72.2 in)
- Height: 1,925 mm (75.8 in)
- Kerb weight: 1,950 kg (4,299 lb)

The BAW Luba (Chinese: 陆霸) is a full-size SUV produced by the Chinese manufacturer BAW from 2001 to 2017. It was a licensed rebadge of the Toyota Land Cruiser Prado J90.

== Overview ==
The BAW Luba debuted in 2001 and is based on the platform of the Toyota Land Cruiser Prado (J90) or the Land Cruiser Prado produced from 1996 to 2002. Toyota ceased production of the Toyota Land Cruiser Prado J90 in Japan in 2003 and sold the production line and platform to BAW. Initially, power of the BAW Luba came from an imported 3.4 liter 6-cylinder Toyota 5VZ engine producing 136 kW (182 hp) and 294 N⋅m (217 lb⋅ft). However, later in the market from 2010 to 2012, engines of the BAW Luba was changed and the updated options include a 2.4 liter engine and a G4BA 2.7-liter four-cylinder engine produced by Shenyang Xinguang Huaxiang Automobile Engine Manufacturing (XG Engine) producing 110 kW (150 hp) and 160 lb⋅ft (217 N⋅m) and a 2.7 liter producing 107 kW (143 hp) and 235 N⋅m (173 lb⋅ft). Price range of the BAW Luba starts from 152,800 yuan and ends at 172,800 yuan before discontinuation.

News of a facelift was revealed in 2017 updating the front end design to be inline with the BAW Yusheng compact SUV.

== Foreign markets ==
A version called the BAW Luba S100 was produced since 2009 with a pickup version of the BAW Luba called BAW Yueling launched. In Russia, the BAW Luba was sold under the name BAW Land King.

== BAW Yueling pickup ==
The BAW Yueling pickup (越铃) is a pickup based on the BAW Luba SUV with a price range of 51,700 yuan to 75,800 yuan. The BAW Yueling pickup was available in two versions, including a standard version and a long version. The standard version features a 2.2 liter engine with a length of 5165 mm, a width of 1840 mm and a height of 1850 mm. The wheelbase is longer than the Luba at 3035 mm. The long version shares the width and height while being longer with a length of 5480 mm and a wheelbase of 3350 mm. Curb weight of the BAW Yueling pickup is 1,700 kg (3,748 lb) with the long version weighing 50 kg (110 lb) more.

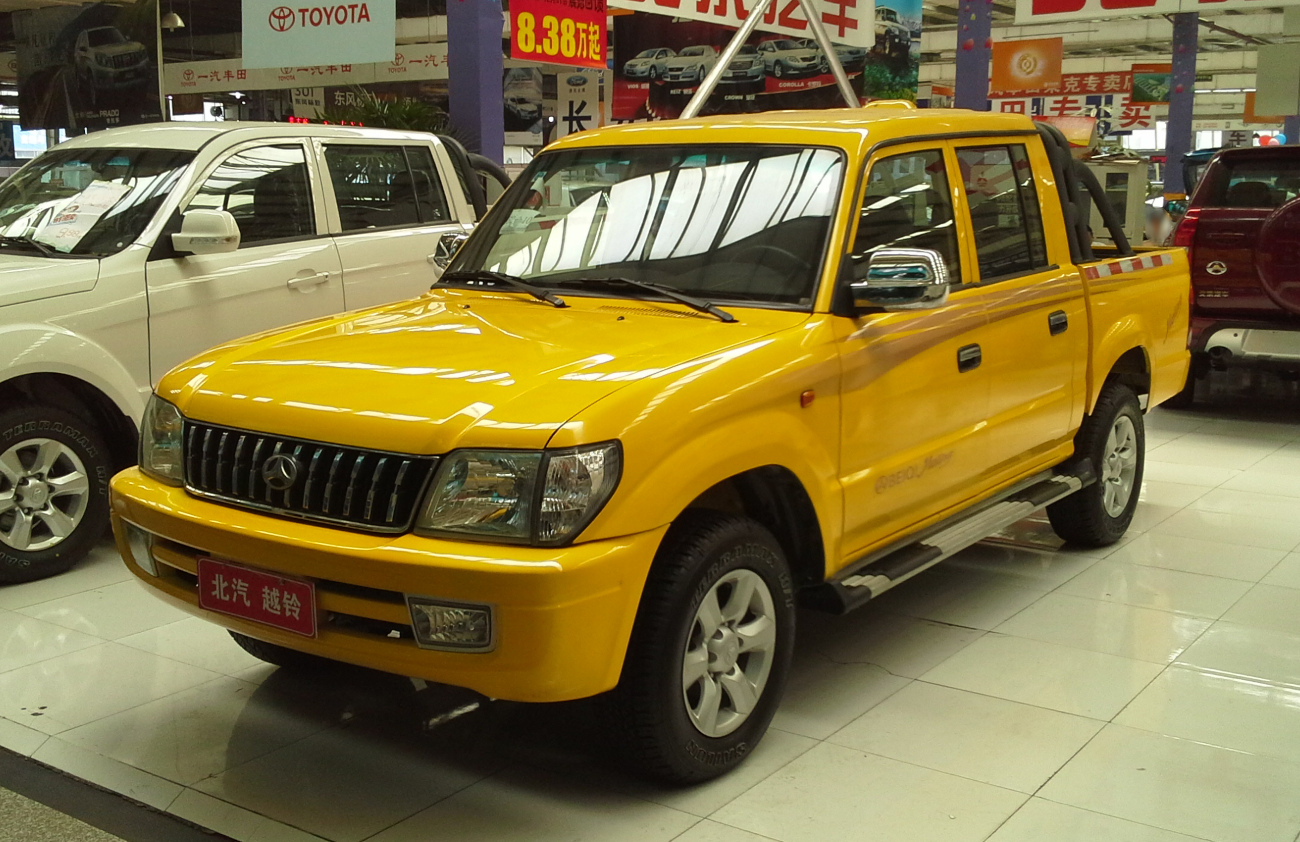
BAW Yueling pickup

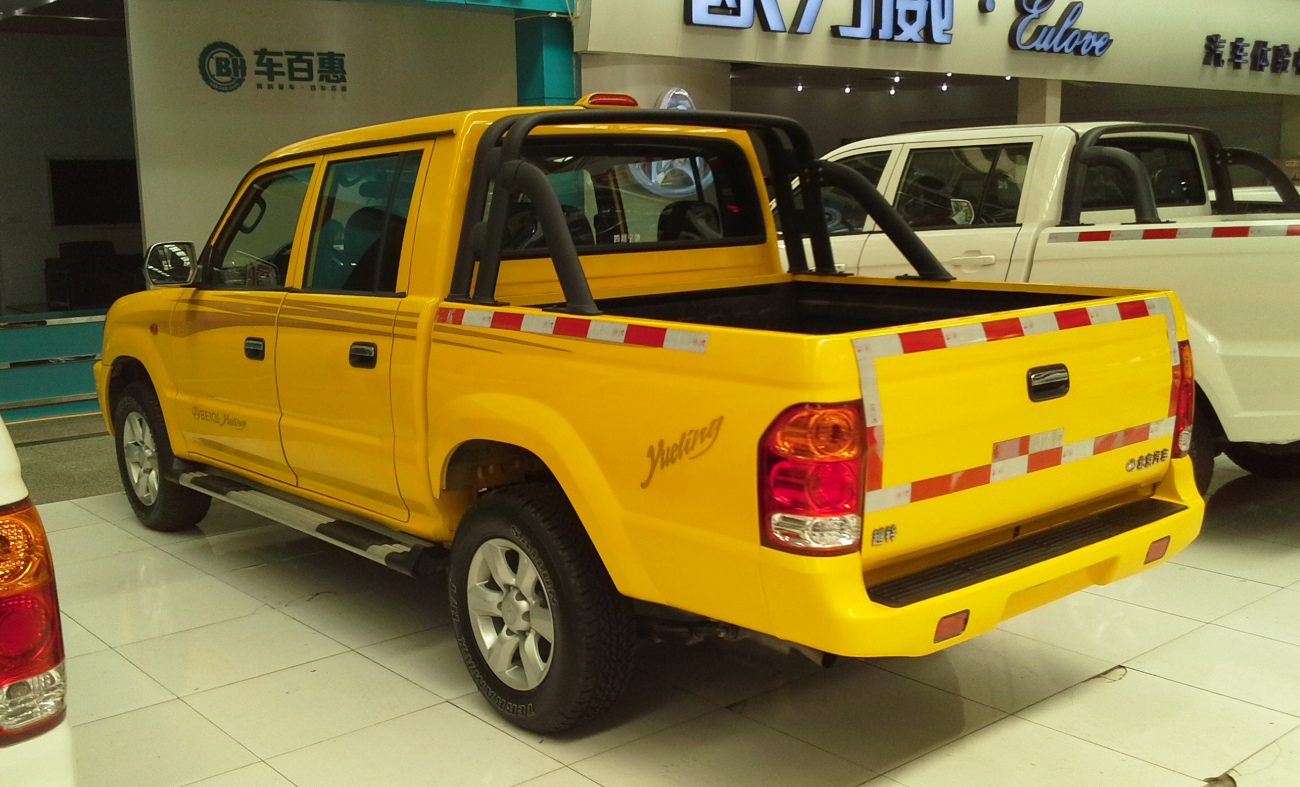
BAW Yueling pickup rear
