= BAW =

Chinese car manufacturer

Beijing Automobile Works Co., Ltd.
- Type: Private
- Industry: Automotive
- Founded: 1953; 73 years ago
- Headquarters: Qingdao, Shandong, China
- Products: Automobiles, commercial vehicles
- Parent: Shandong Weiqiao Pioneering Group
- Website: baw.com.cn

Beijing Automobile Works Co., Ltd. (BAW) (Chinese: 北京汽车制造厂有限公司, short form: 北汽制造) is a Chinese car manufacturer based in Qingdao. It used to be a subsidiary of state-owned BAIC Group but was sold to private sector since 2015. BAW started off producing light off-road vehicles and trucks, and nowadays, BAW produces civilian as well as military vehicles.

== History ==
Beijing Automobile Works was founded in 1953 as The First Accessory Factory and was renamed to Beijing Automobile Works in 1958. In 1987 the company merged with Beijing Motorcycle Company to become the Automobile and Motorcycle United Company (BAM).

The modern company, Beijing Automobile Works Co., Ltd (BAW), was founded in 2001 and incorporates the original Beijing Automobile Works, as well as the first Chinese automobile joint venture Beijing Jeep, Beijing Automobile Assembly and Foton Motor.

In 2010, BAW became a subsidiary of Beijing Automotive Group(BAIC).

In May 2020, BAIC Group sold its stake of BAW to Qingdao Fulu Investment Holding Group, a private company specializes in producing low-speed electric vehicles. BAW was officially disengaging from BAIC Group and transitioning from a state-owned enterprise to a private enterprise. The headquarters of BAW was moved from Beijing to Qingdao, Shandong.

In April 2023, BAW was acquired by Shandong Weiqiao Pioneering Group, a private company active in the textiles and aluminium industry.

In March 2024, BAW launched the 212 brand as an independent brand focusing on off-road vehicles. With the existing BAW BJ212 now being sold as the 212 classic, and a brand new vehicle called the 212 T01.

In June 2024, BAIC Group issued a clarification statement. The statement mentioned that Beijing Automobile Works Co., Ltd. and BAIC Group have no equity or property rights relationships.

== Product ==
=== 212 brand ===
- 212 T01 (2024–present), mid-size SUV
  - 212 T01 Explorer (2025–present), pickup truck variant
  - 212 T10 (to commence), three-door variant
- 212 X03 (to commence), mid-size SUV
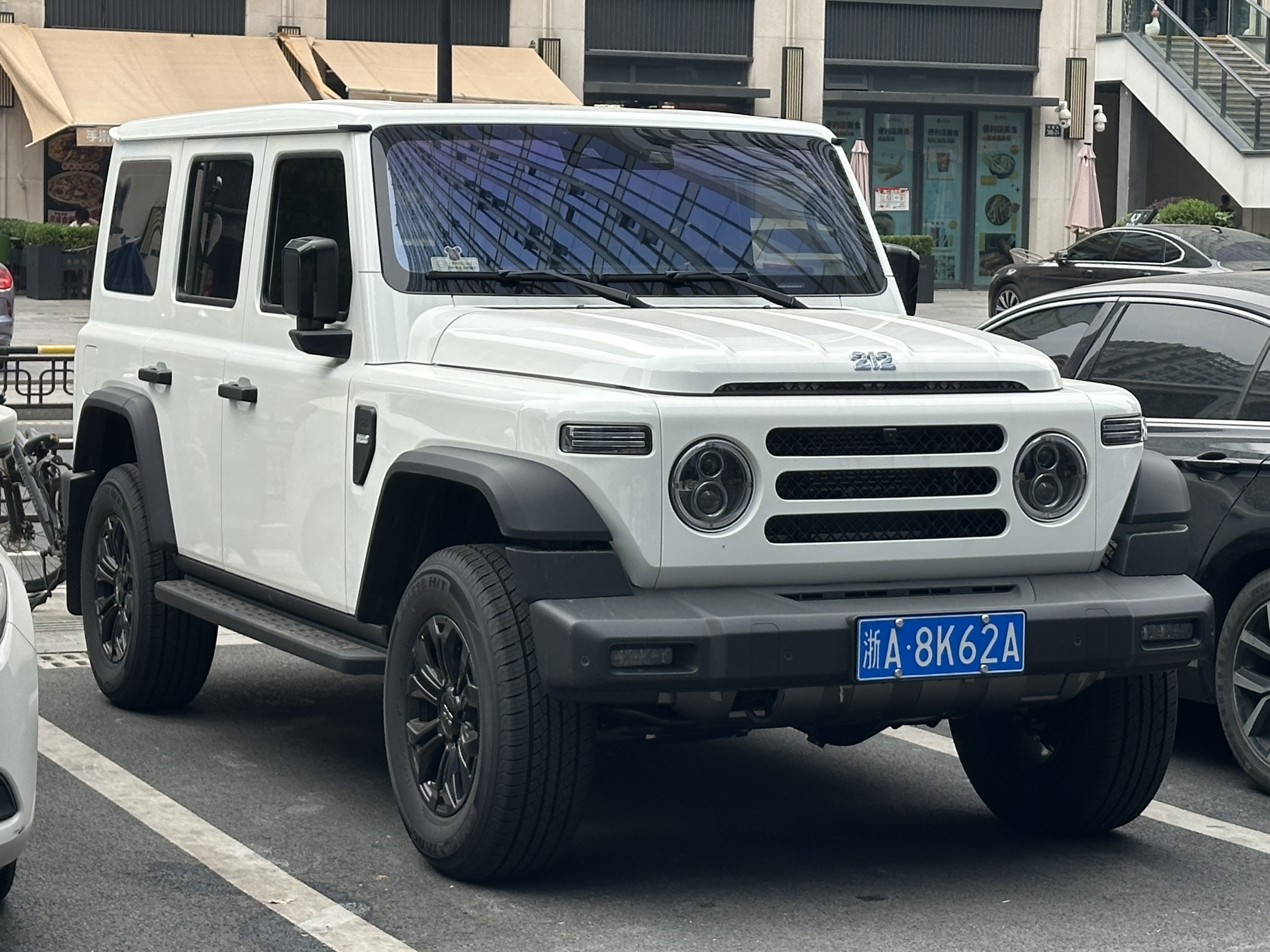
212 T01

212 X03

=== Reach ===
Reach (北汽雷驰) is a new energy light commercial vehicle brand established in January 2011 focusing on the urban new energy logistics vehicle market. It is a brand under Shandong Reach New Energy Vehicle Co., Ltd., co-invested and established jointly by Shandong Weiqiao Pioneering Group, BAW, and Linyi City Development Group. Products are new energy micro trucks and vans:

- REACH Ren T10
- REACH Ren T30
- REACH Xin V70
- REACH Xin V80/ V90
Ren T30

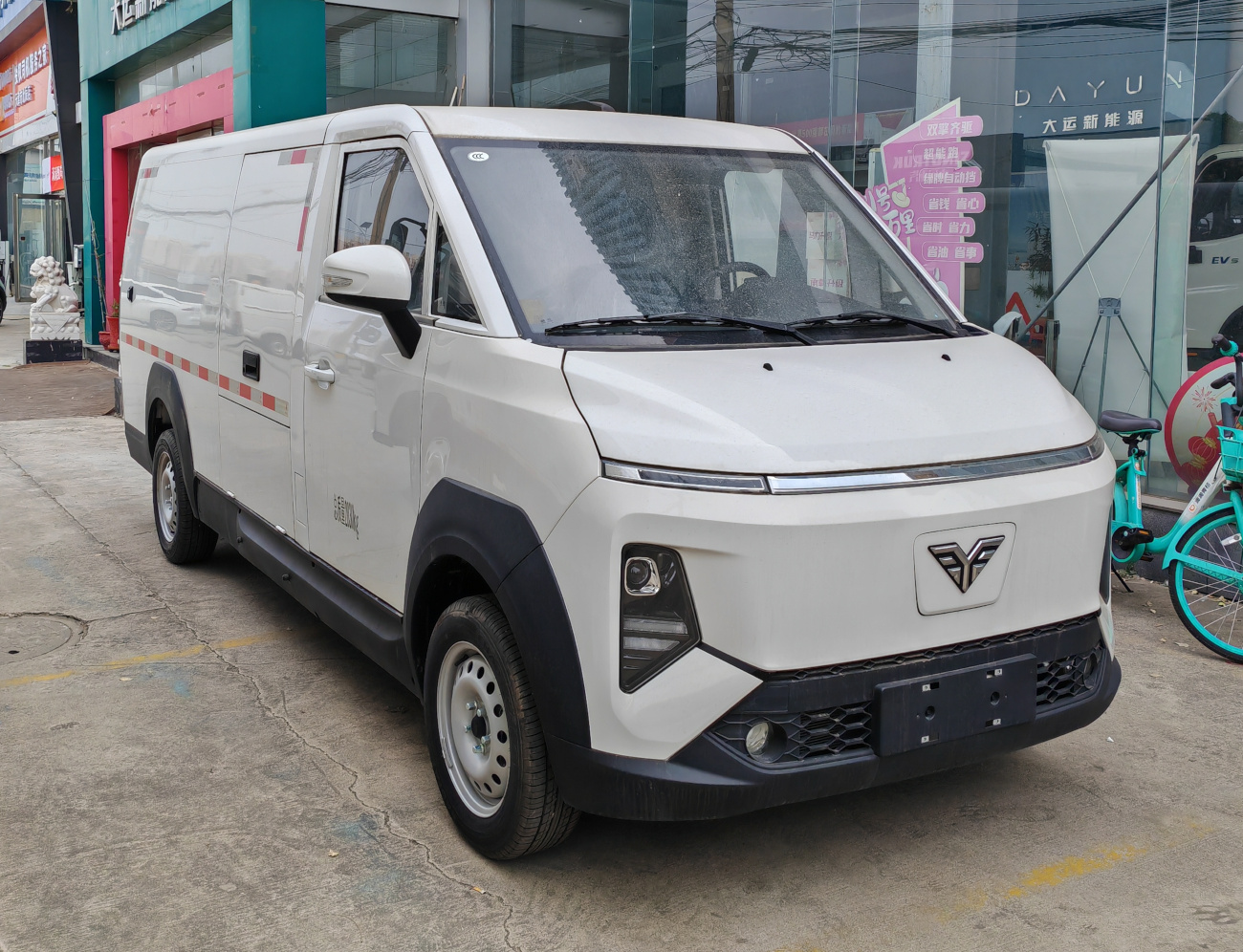
Reach Xin V70

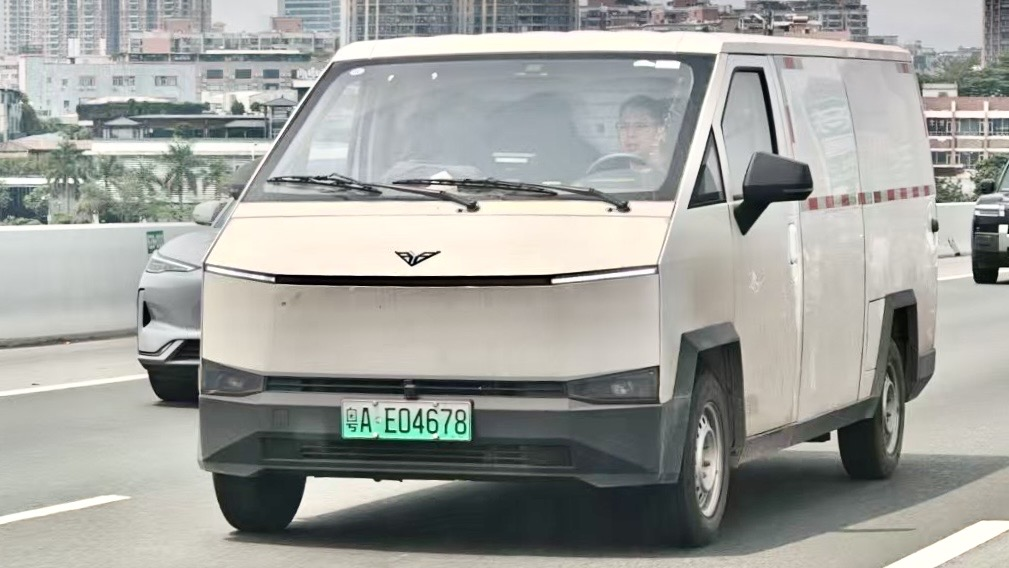
REACH Xin V80

=== BAW brand ===
- BAW Yuanbao (2021–present), city car, BEV
- BAW Damao/E6 Pudding (2020–present), city car, BEV
- BAW BJ212 (1965–present), subcompact SUV
- BAW Kaluli/F7 (2023–present), full-size pick-up
- BAW Xiaohema (2020–present), microvan, BEV, rebadged Wuling EV50
- BAW Ruisheng Ace M7 (2022–present), compact van, ICE/BEV
  - BAW Vala (2024–present), campervan variant of Ruisheng Ace 007
- BAW Ruisheng M8 (2025–present), mid-size van, ICE/BEV
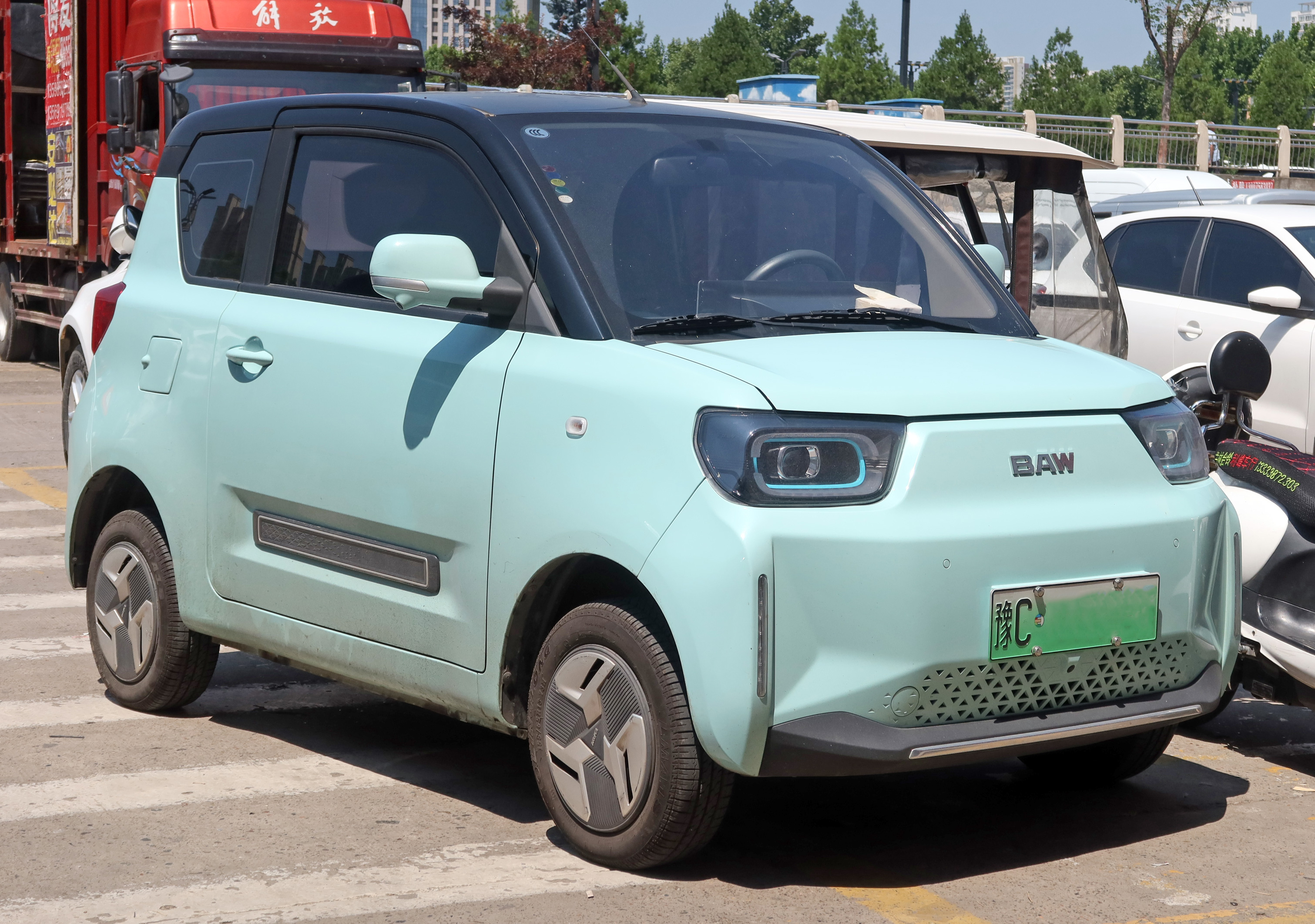
BAW Yuanbao

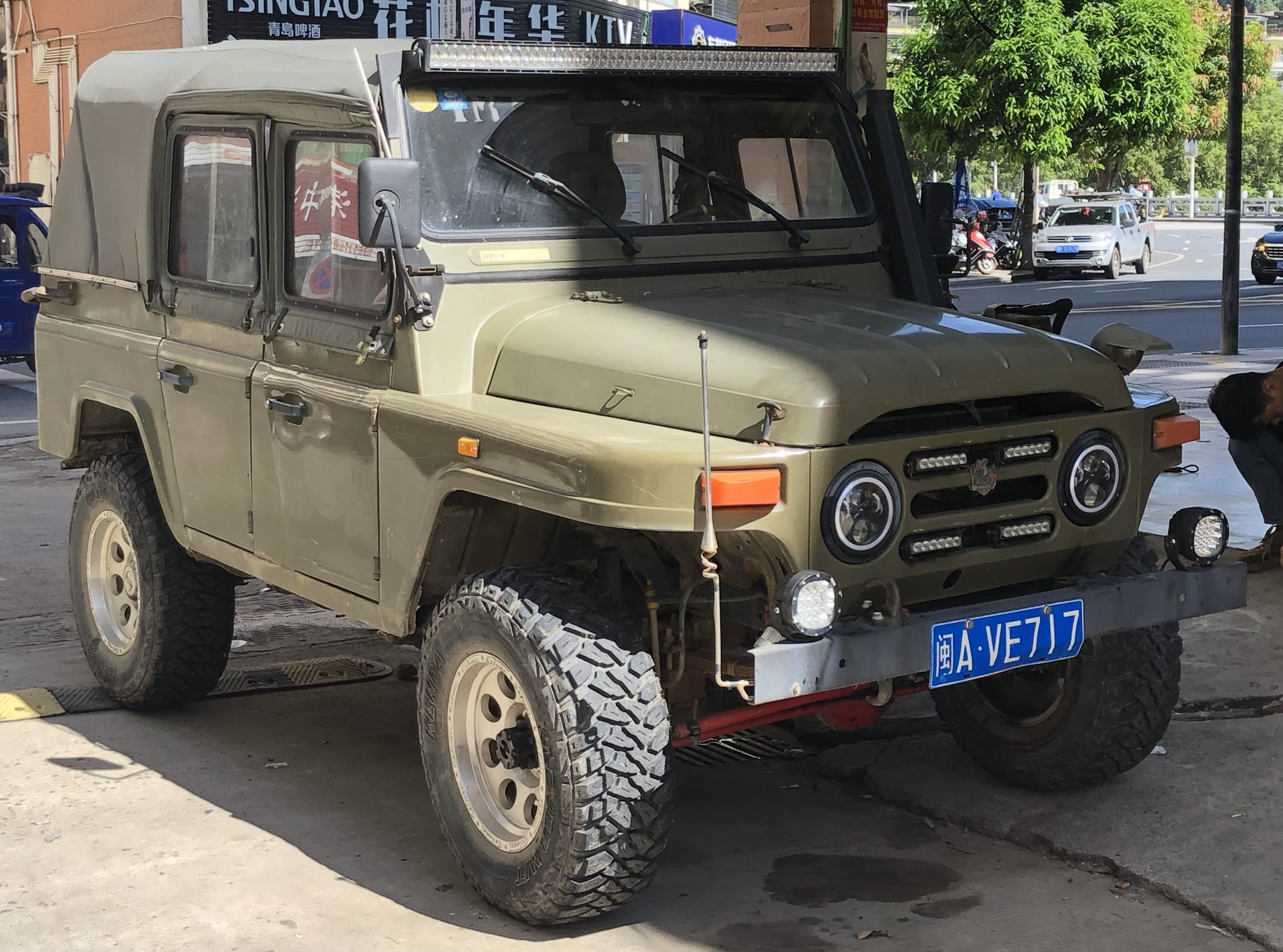
BAW BJ212

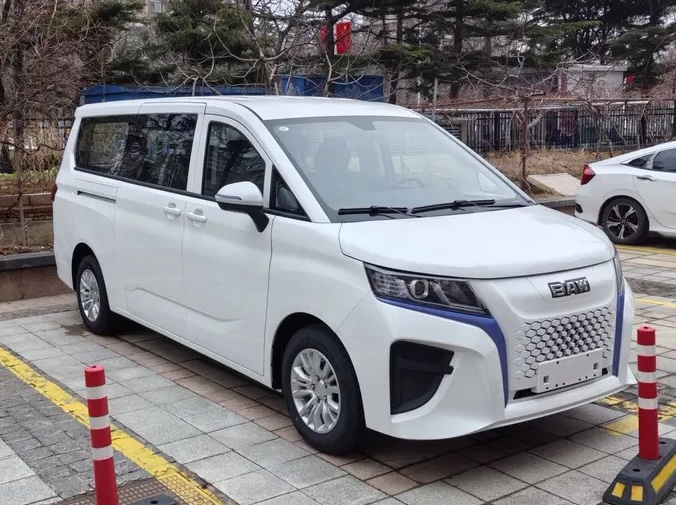
BAW Ruisheng Wangpai M7

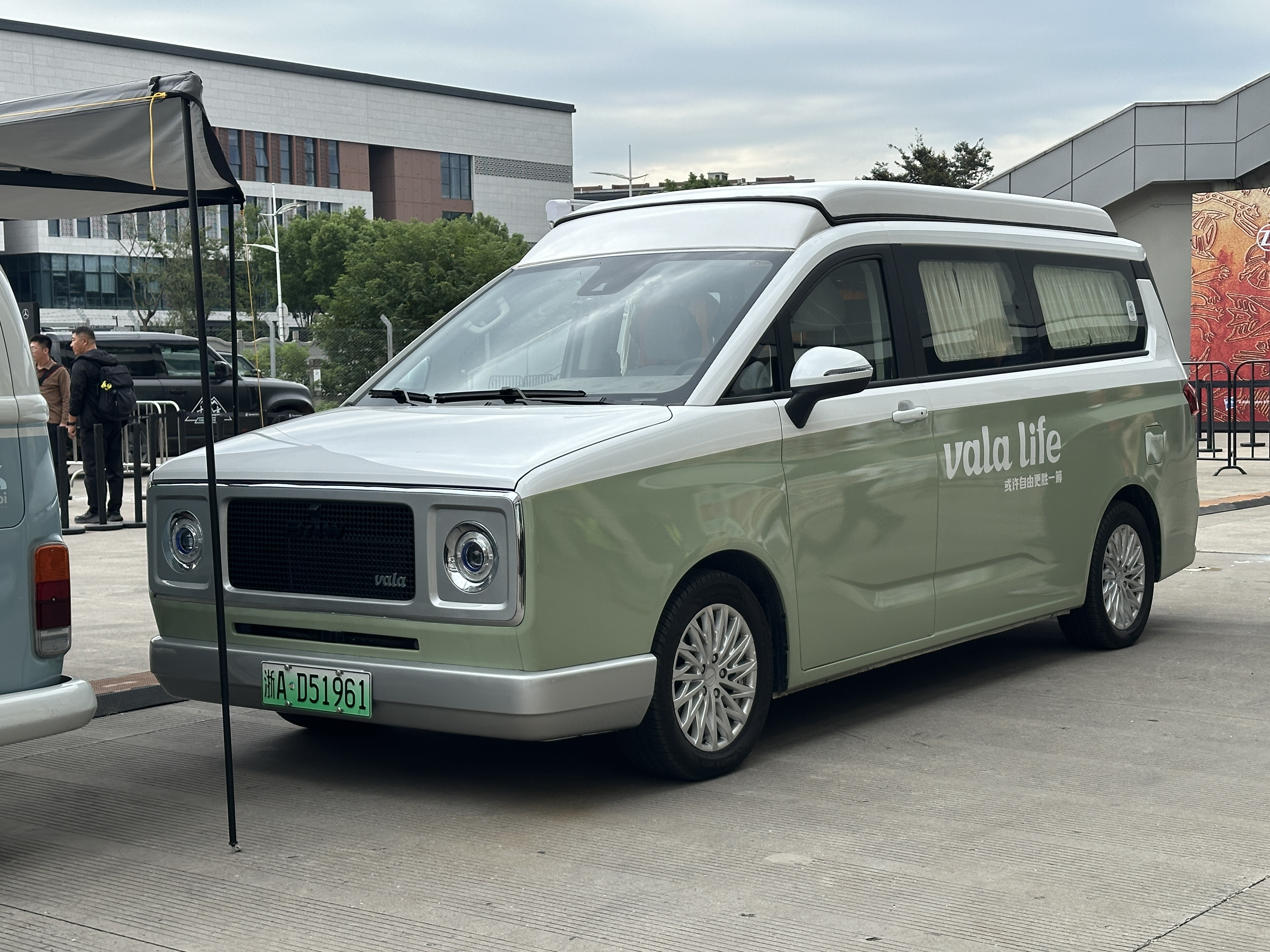
BAW Vala

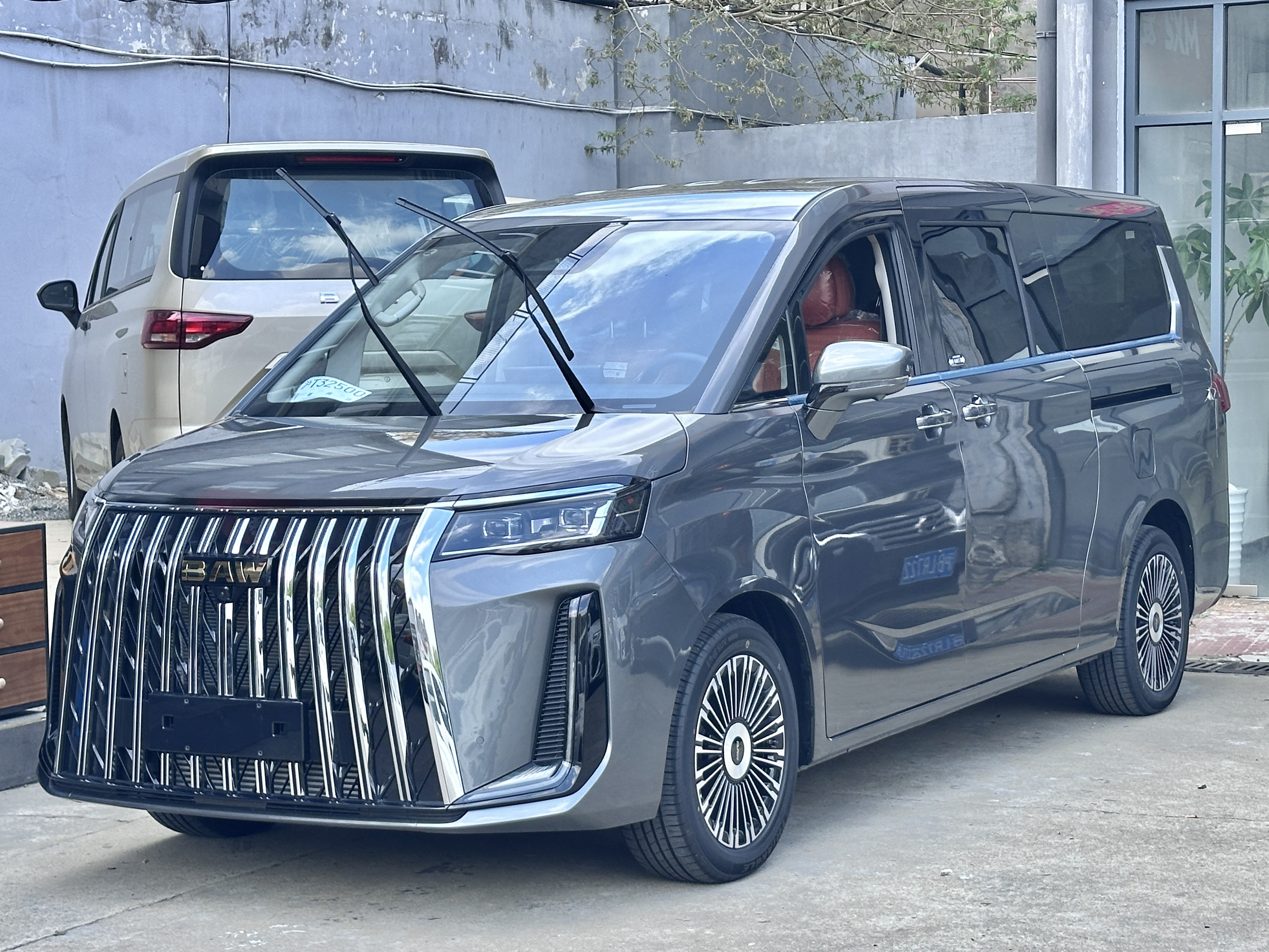
BAW Ruisheng M8

=== Former models ===
- BAW Jiabao/E7 Bagel (2023–2024), city car, BEV
- BAW Yusheng/BW007 (2010–2017), compact SUV
  - BAW Ruiling (2013–2017), pick-up variant of Yusheng
- BAW Luling (2012–2013), compact pick-up truck
- BAW Luba/BJ2032 (2002–2017), full-size SUV
  - BAW Yueling/BJ1021 (2021–2015), pick-up variant of Luba
- BAW Qishi (2009-2014), compact SUV
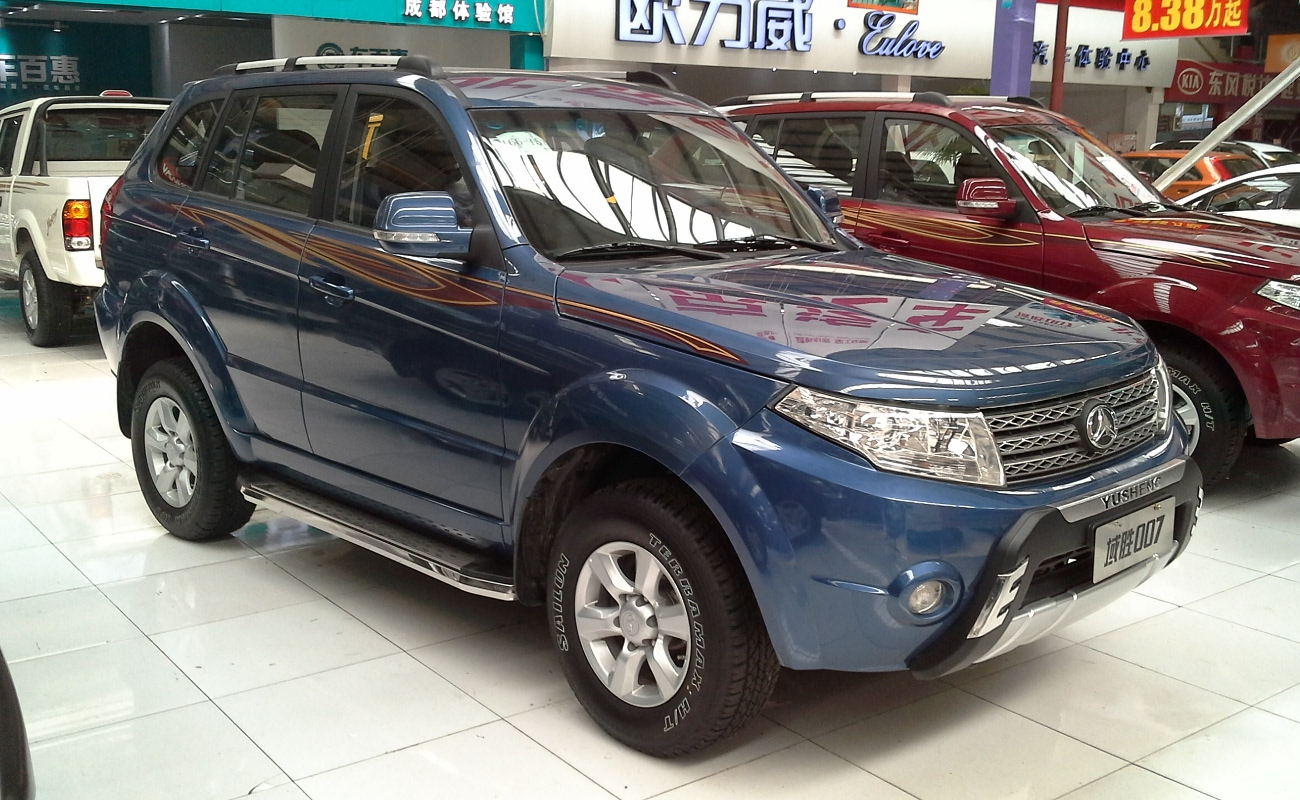
BAW Yusheng

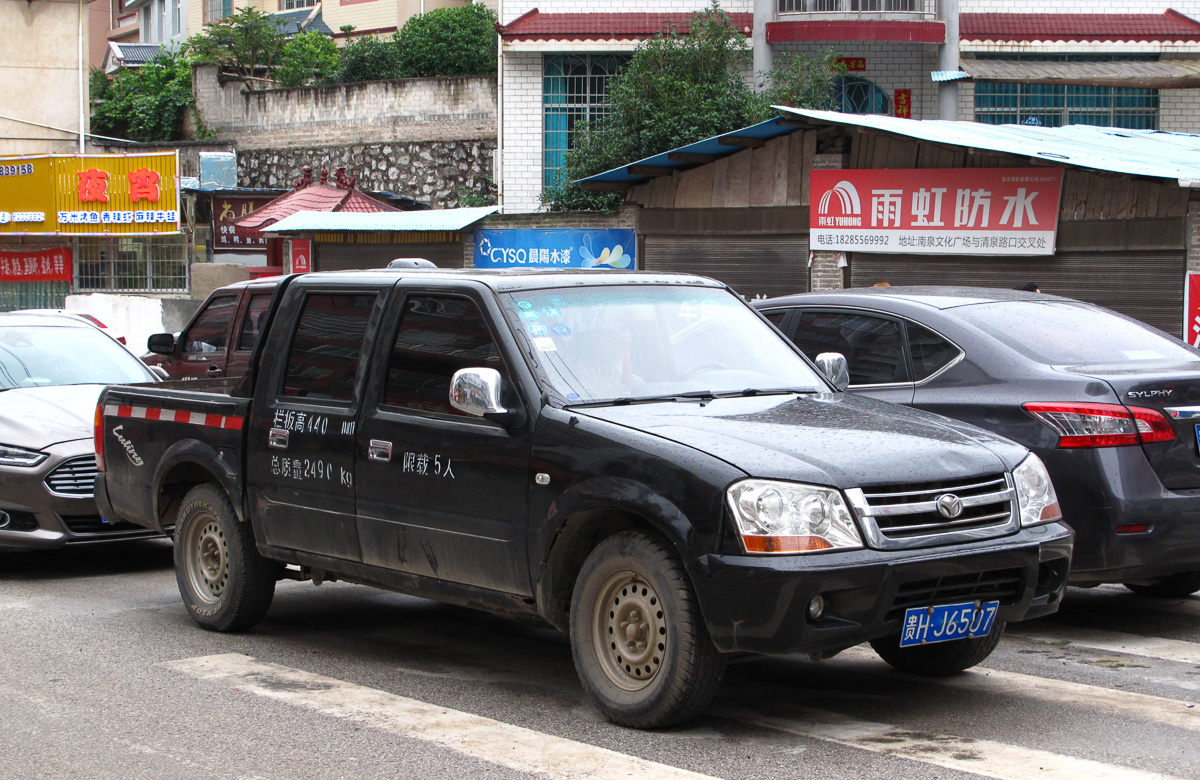
BAW Luling

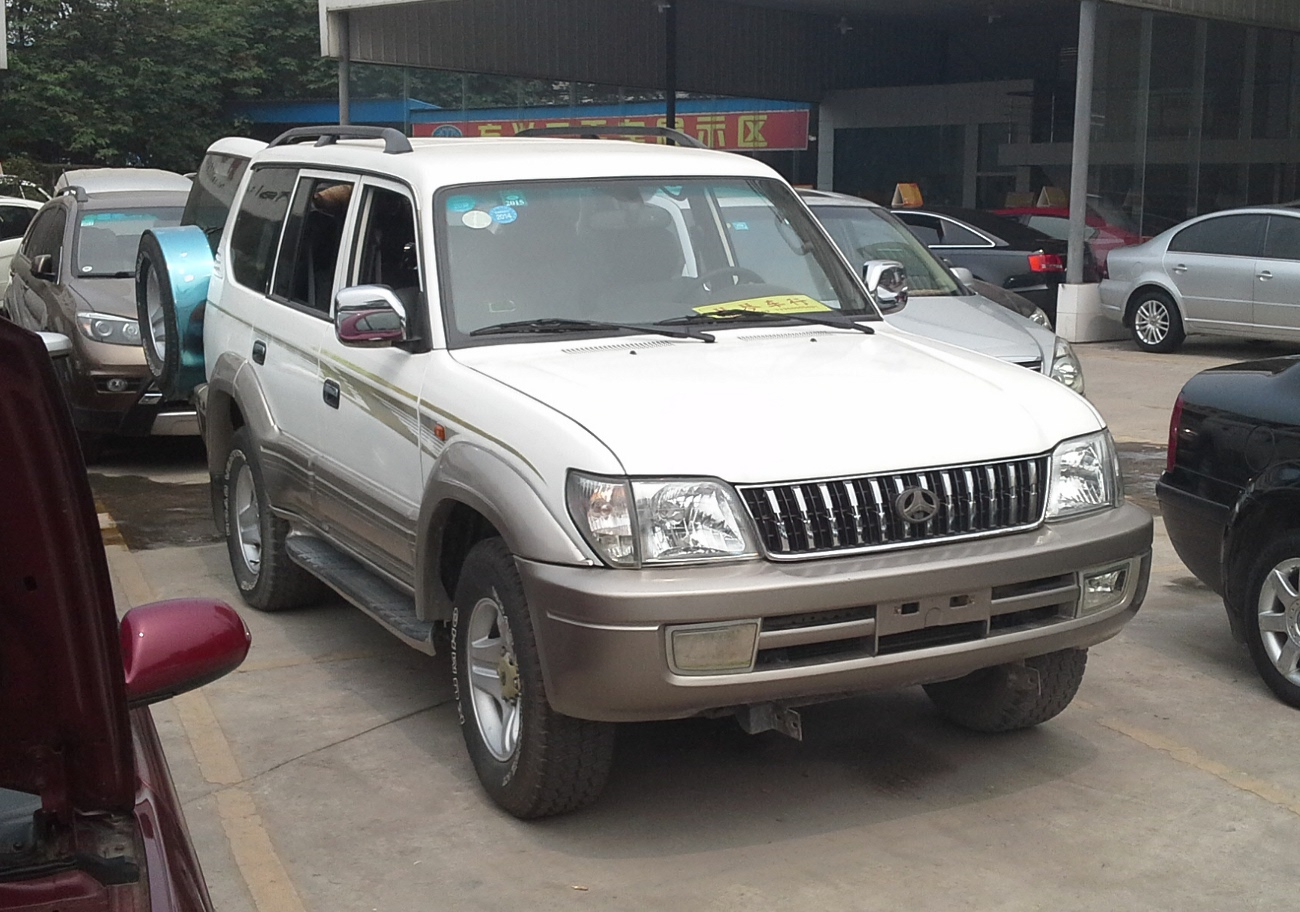
BAW Luba

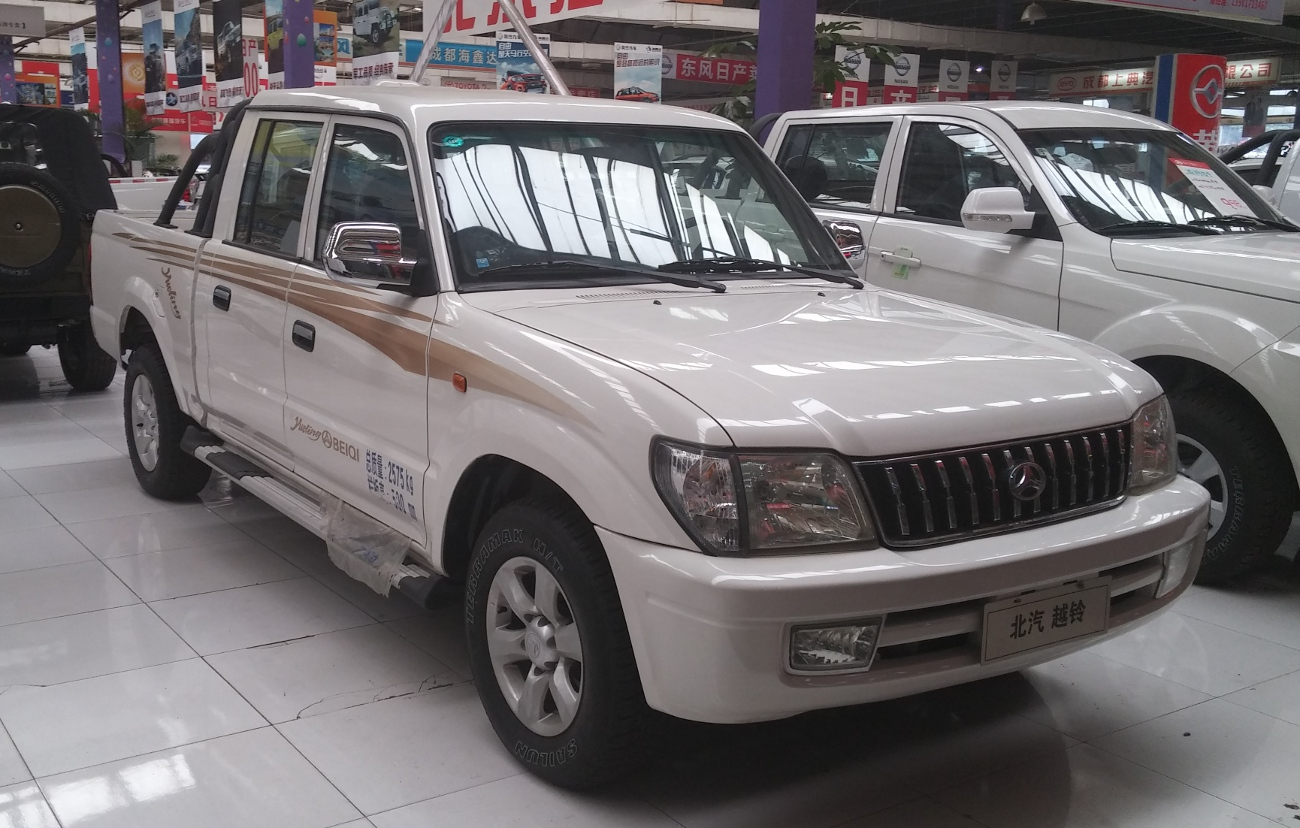
BAW Yueling

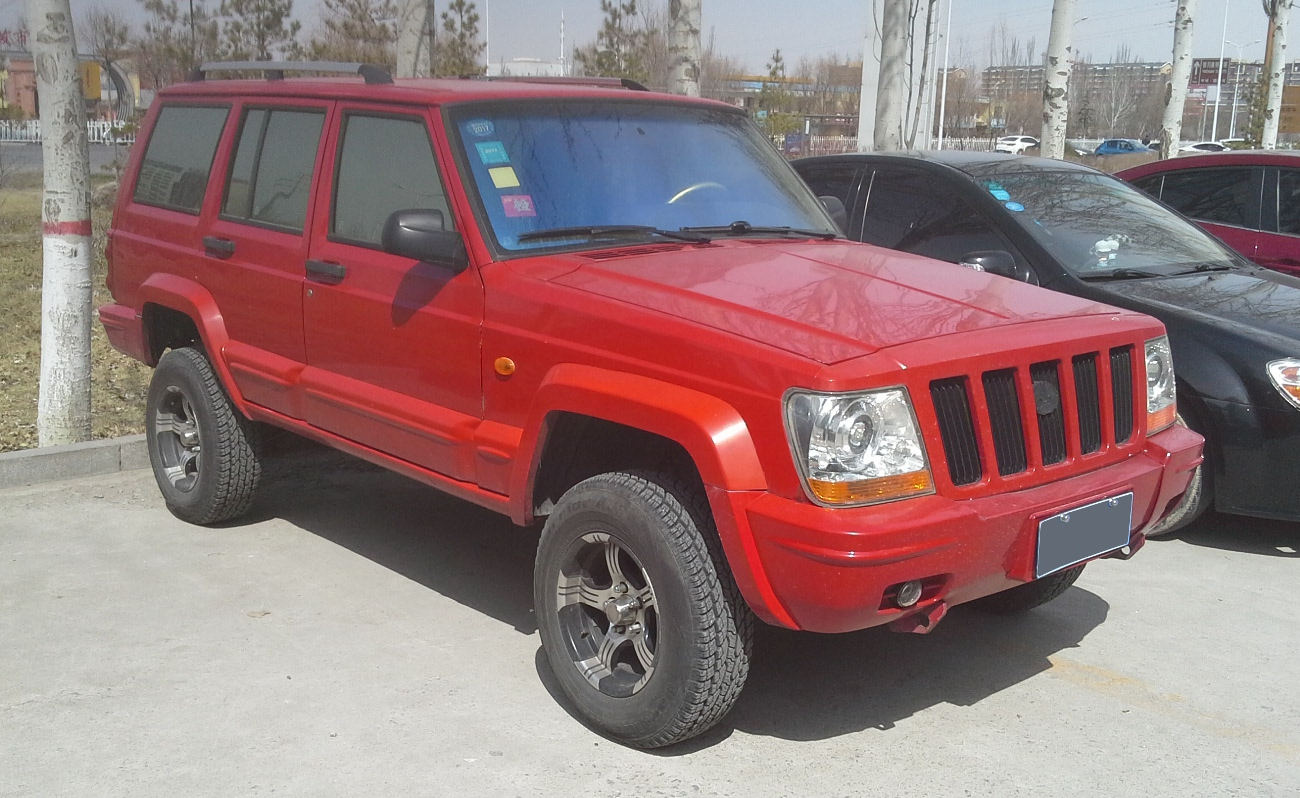
BAW Qishi

=== Historic BAIC/Beijing vehicles ===
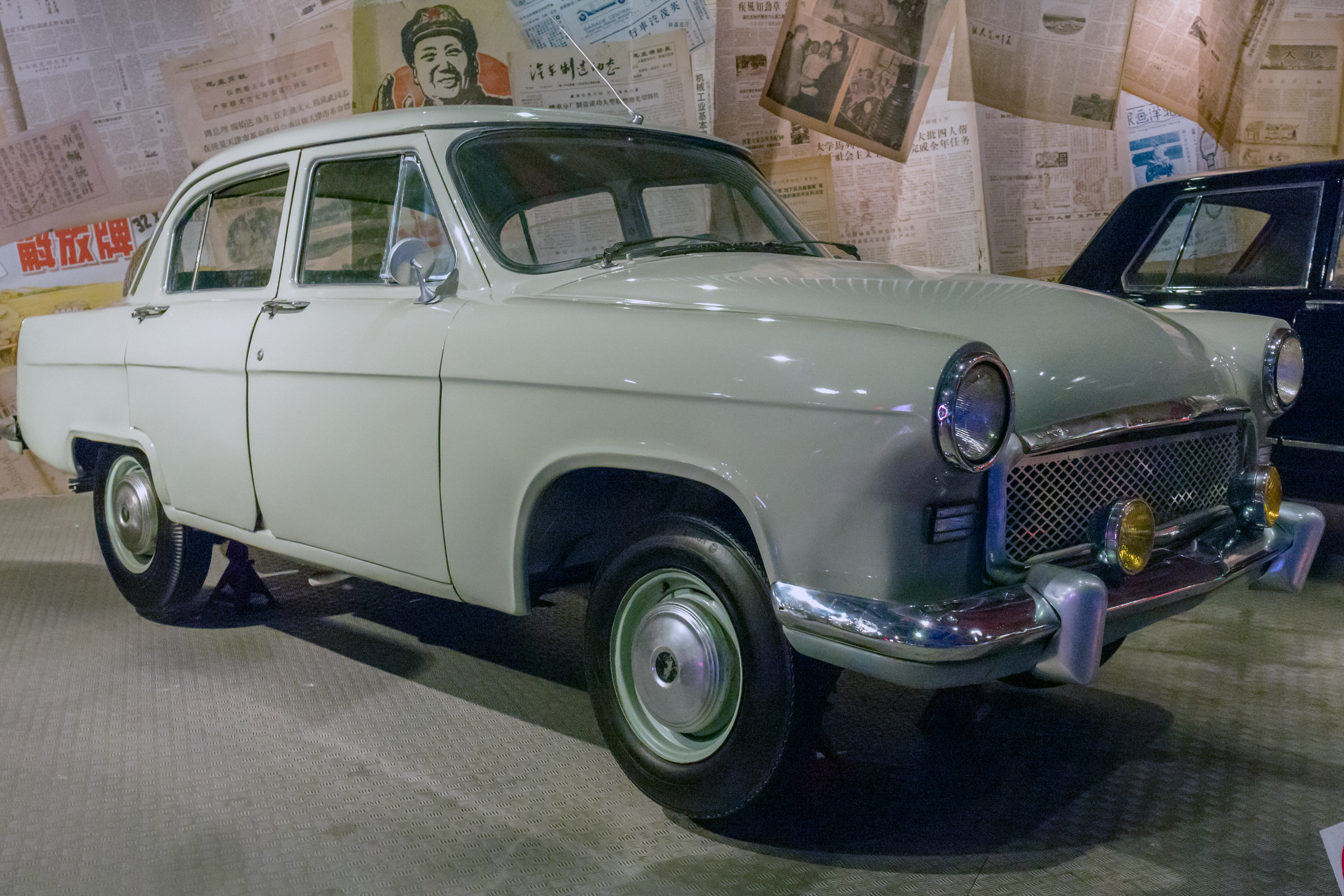
Recreation of a Dongfanghong

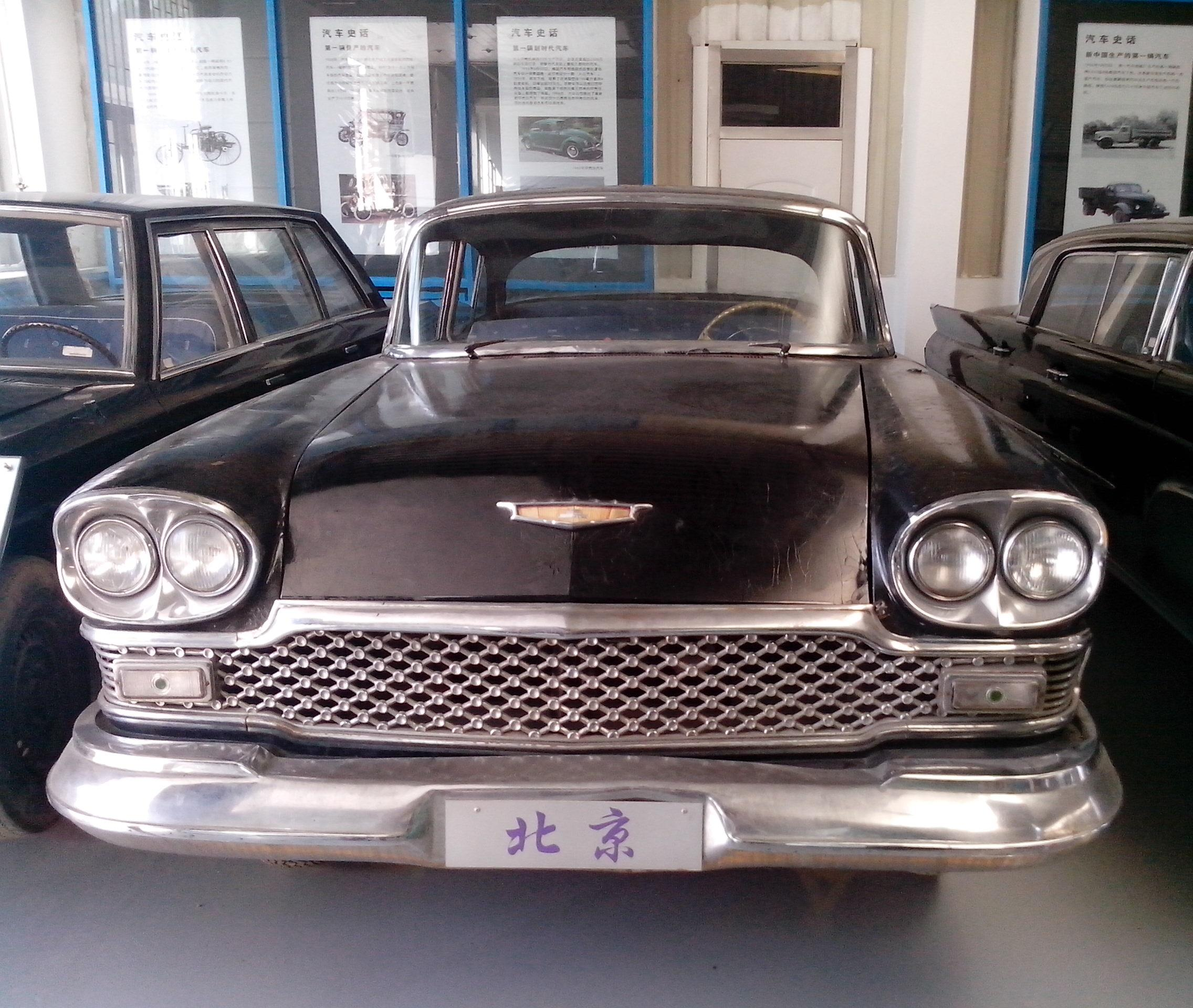
Beijing Automobile Works produced this 1960 Chinese luxury car CB4 heavily inspired by the 1956 Buick with a Cadillac front

- Jinggangshan (1958–1960), compact sedan
- Beijing CB4 (1959–1962), full-size sedan
- Dongfanghong BJ760 (1959–1962), mid-size sedan
- Dongfanghong BJ761 (1960–?) , mid-size sedan
  - Hongwei BJ761, station wagon variant of the Dongfanghong BJ761
- Beijing BJ750/751/752 (1974–1982), mid-size sedan
- BJ5020 (2005–?), mid-size van
- Beijing BJ6410, compact MPV, license-built Renault Scenic
- Beijing BJ6470 (1996–?) ,full-size sedan, license-built Mazda 929)
- Beijing BJ6490 (1996–?),full-size sedan, based on the Holden Commodore (VN)
- Beijing BJ130 (1973–2002), light truck
- BJ136 (based on Toyota Dyna)
- Beijing Qiling/Fenix (based on the Isuzu N series)
- Qilong/Tonik/BL1 (based on the Isuzu N series)
- Haice/Haise/B6/009 - a license built fourth generation Toyota Hiace
- BJ6490A – Mitsubishi L300 with a different front end
- BD6

=== Military vehicles ===
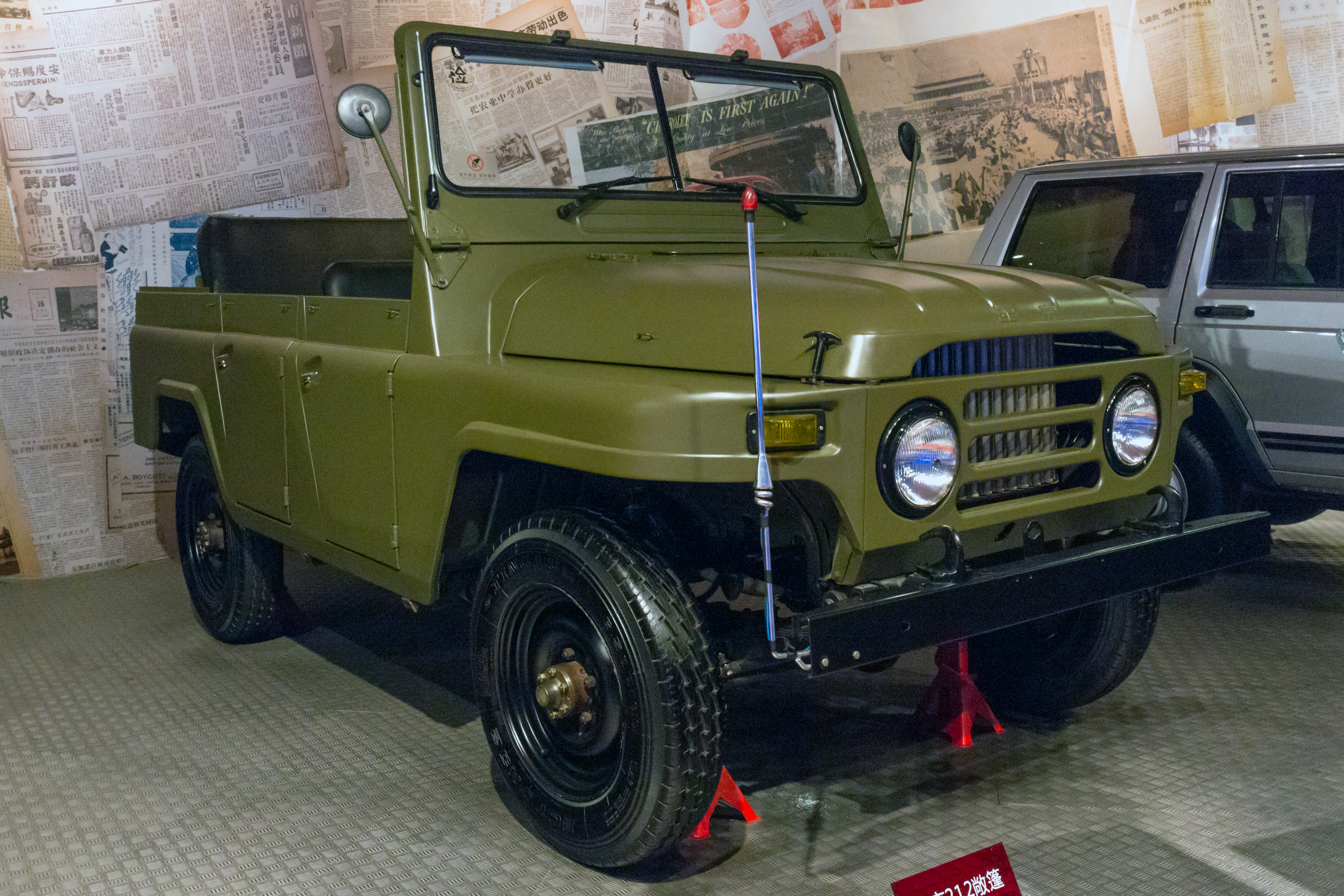
The 1974 Beijing BJ212

- BJ210 (based on the Jeep M-170)
- BJ212(4X4)
- BJ2020VJ(4X4)
- BJ2022(4X4)(Brave Warrior)
- BJ2020VAJ(4X4)
- BJ20203(4X4)
- BJ2032VJ(4X4)

== Sales ==
Sales of Beijing Automobile Works
Year	Total	BAW	212
2020	2,248	2,248	-
2021	3,057	3,057	-
2022	9,759	9,759	-
2023	16,676	16,676	-
2024	20,916	16,654	4,262
2025	36,724	19,718	17,006
