= BAW Ruisheng Wangpai M7 =

Compact MPV

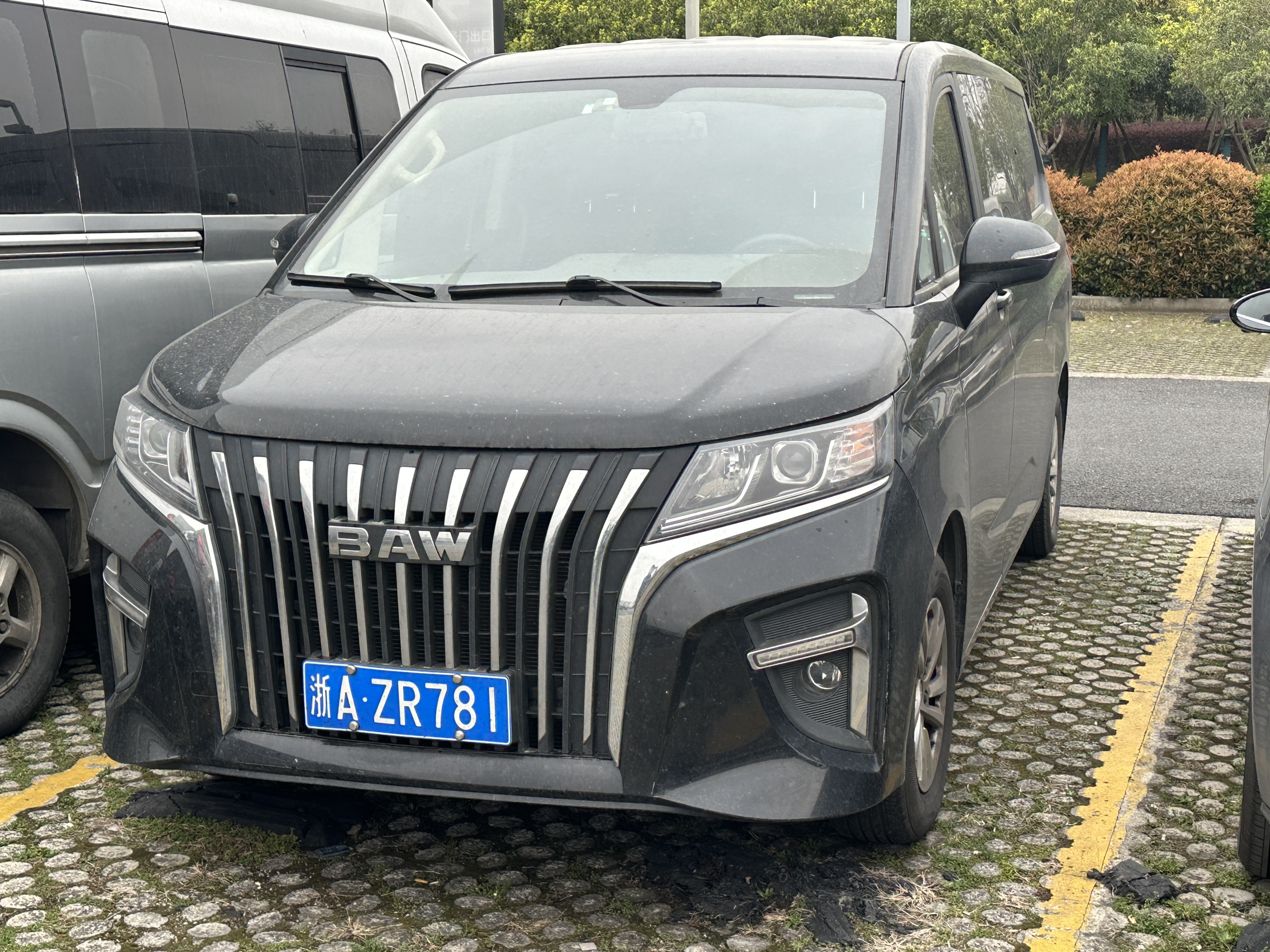

Overview
- Manufacturer: BAW
- Also called: Link Tour M8/E-M8 (2024–2026); EMC 9 (Italy)
- Production: 2022–present
- Assembly: China: Qingdao, Shandong

Body and chassis
- Class: Compact MPV (M)
- Body style: 5-door minivan
- Layout: Front-engine, rear-wheel-drive
- Related: BAW Ruisheng M8

Powertrain
- Engine: Petrol: 1.6 L 4A15J2 turbo I4; 2.0 L LQ481QFB I4
- Transmission: 5-speed manual; 8-speed automatic

Dimensions
- Wheelbase: 2,880 mm (113.4 in); 3,200 mm (126.0 in) (9-seat layout model)
- Length: 4,880 mm (192.1 in); 5,230 mm (205.9 in) (9-seat layout model)
- Width: 1,870 mm (73.6 in)
- Height: 1,950 mm (76.8 in)

The BAW Ruisheng Wangpai M7 (Chinese: 锐胜王牌M7, Ruisheng Ace M7) is a compact MPV manufactured by BAW since 2022.

== Overview ==
The standard length Ruisheng Wangpai M7 is available as a 2, 5, 7-seat MPV, while a longer variant is available as a 9-seater MPV. The seat layouts are in a configuration of 2-seat, 5-seat (2+3), 7-seat (2+2+3), and 9-seat (2+2+2+3).

The Ruisheng Wangpai M7 is available in four powertrain options: gasoline, gasoline with CNG, battery electric, and range extended. The gasoline variant comes with either a 1.6-liter engine producing 92 kW (124 hp) and 161 N⋅m (119 lb⋅ft) of torque, or a 2.0-liter engine producing 107 kW (144 hp) and 200 N⋅m (148 lb⋅ft). Both the pure electric and extended-range variants are equipped with lithium iron phosphate batteries that support fast charging, allowing the state of charge to increase from 30% to 80% in just 45 minutes. The pure electric version offers a maximum driving range of 310 km, while the extended-range model can reach up to 600 km.

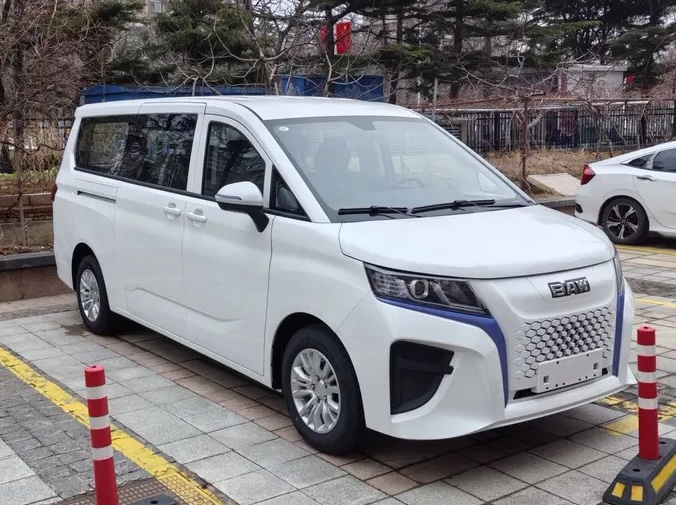
BAW Ruisheng Wangpai E-M7

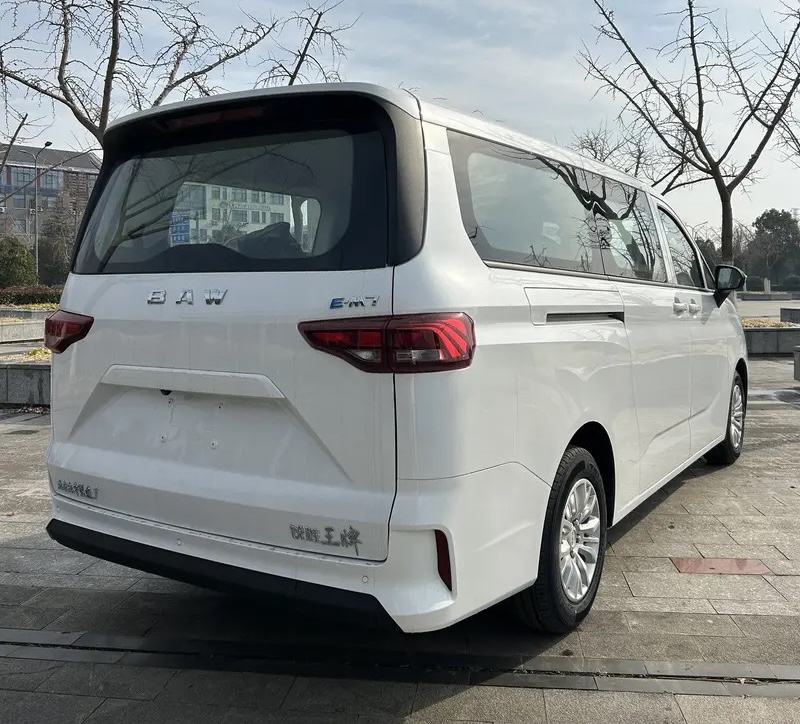
Rear view

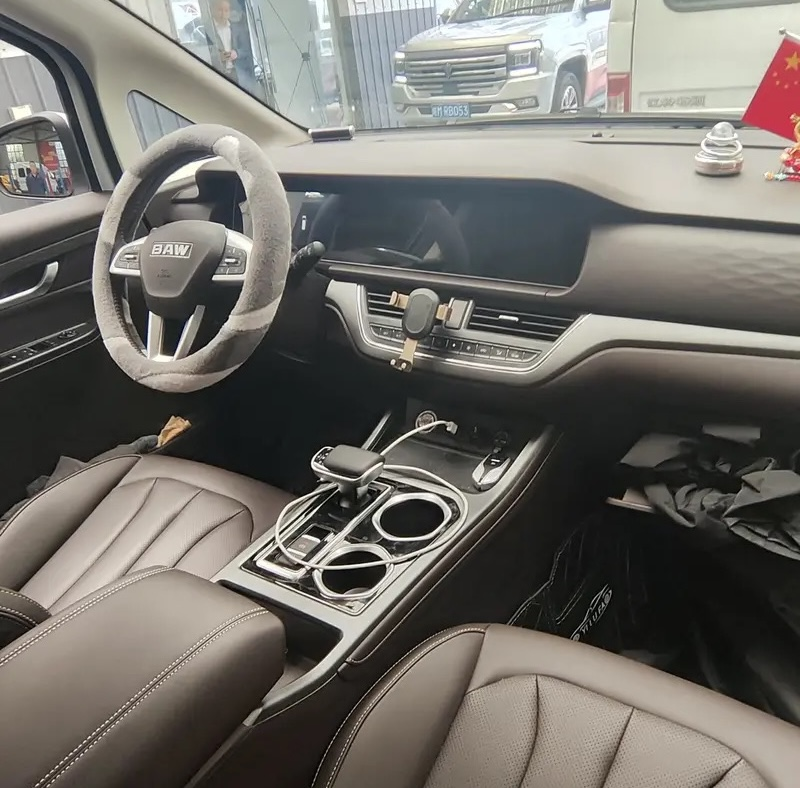
Interior

== BAW Vala ==
A camper van variant based on the Ruisheng Wangpai E-M7 was launched in 2024 called the BAW Vala (自由王国), featuring a restyled retro-style front end and two-tone paint job.

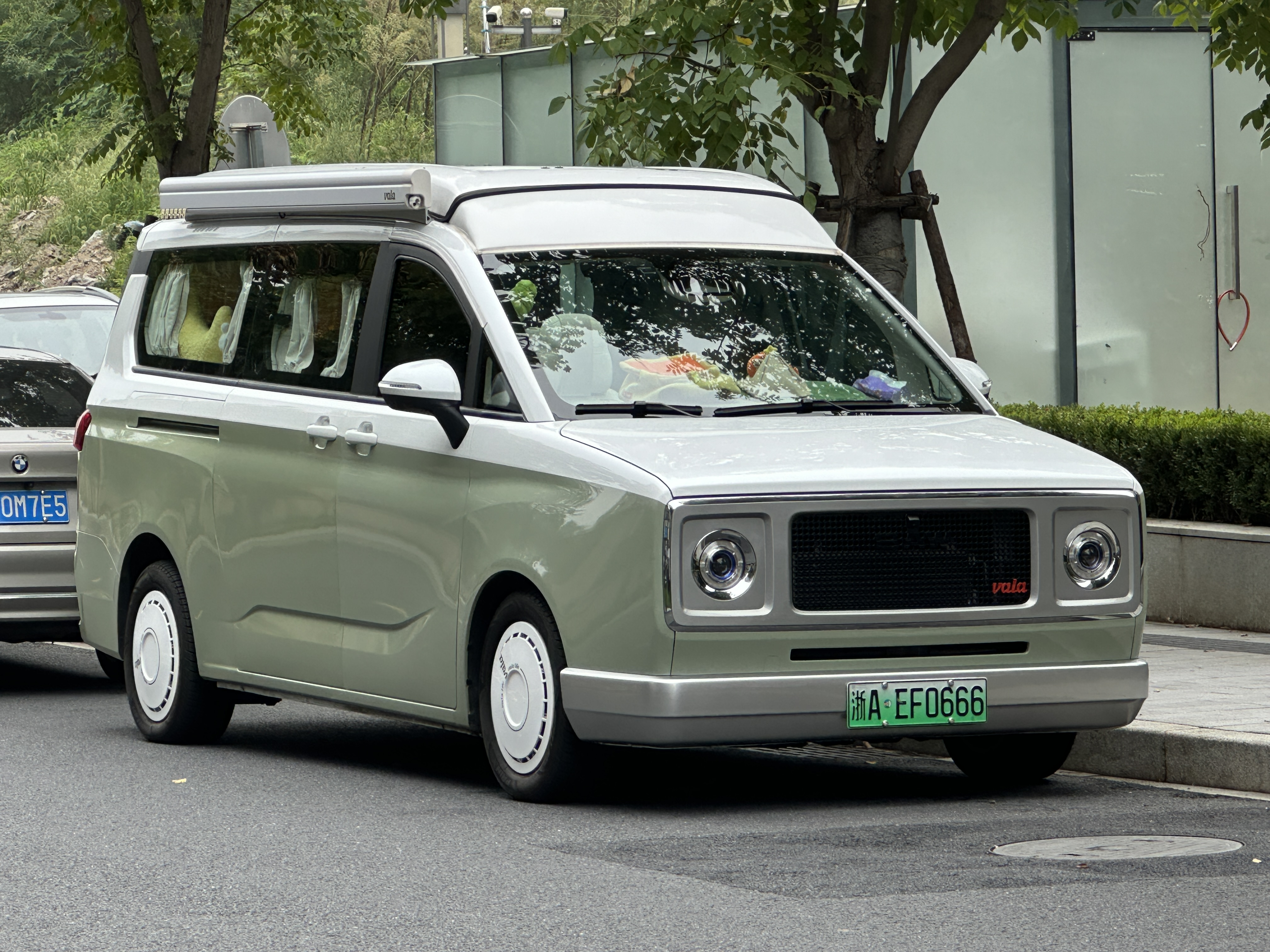
BAW Vala

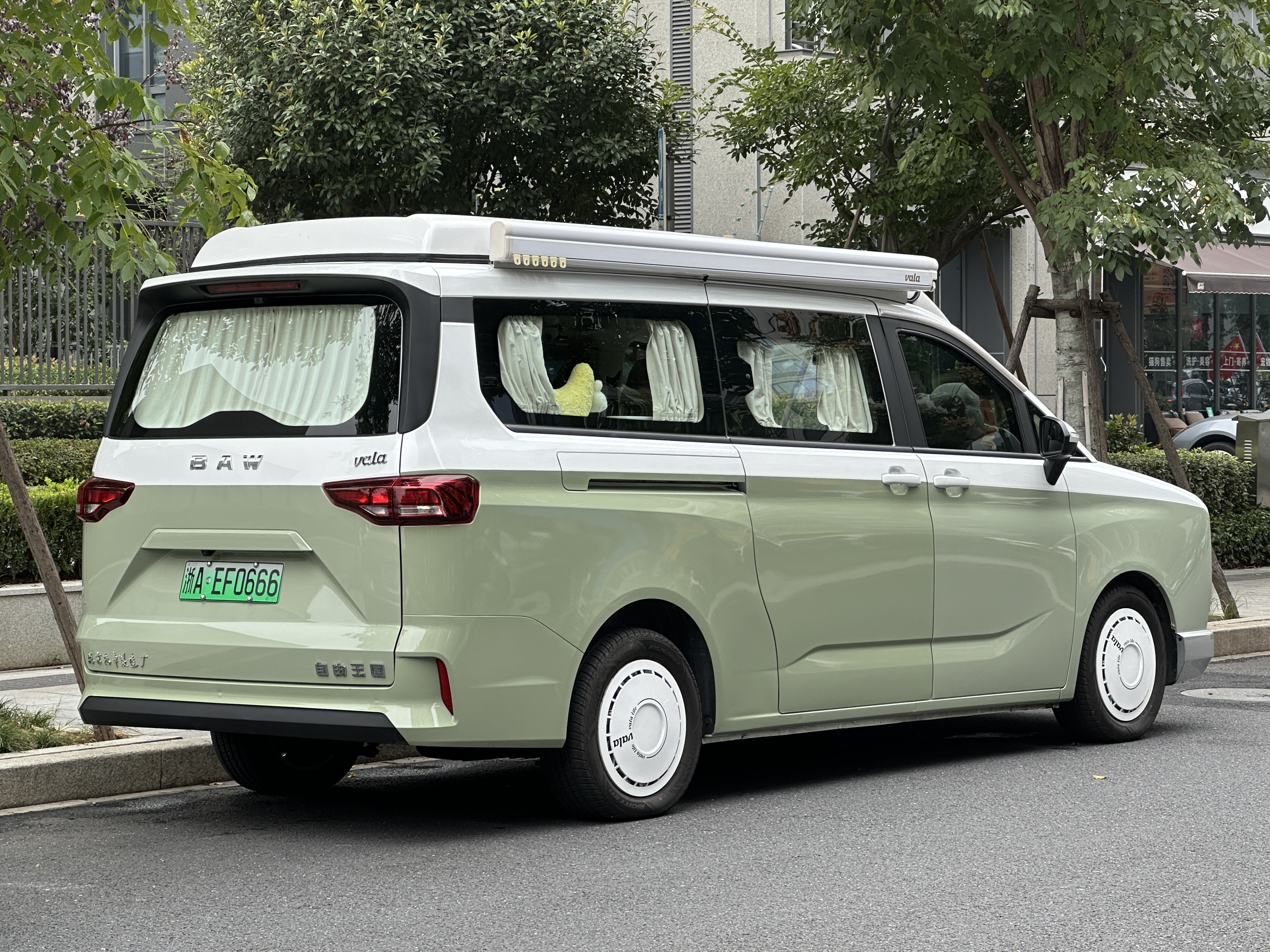
Rear view
