= Foton Smart Smurf E7 =

Battery electric van

Foton Smart Smurf E7/E5
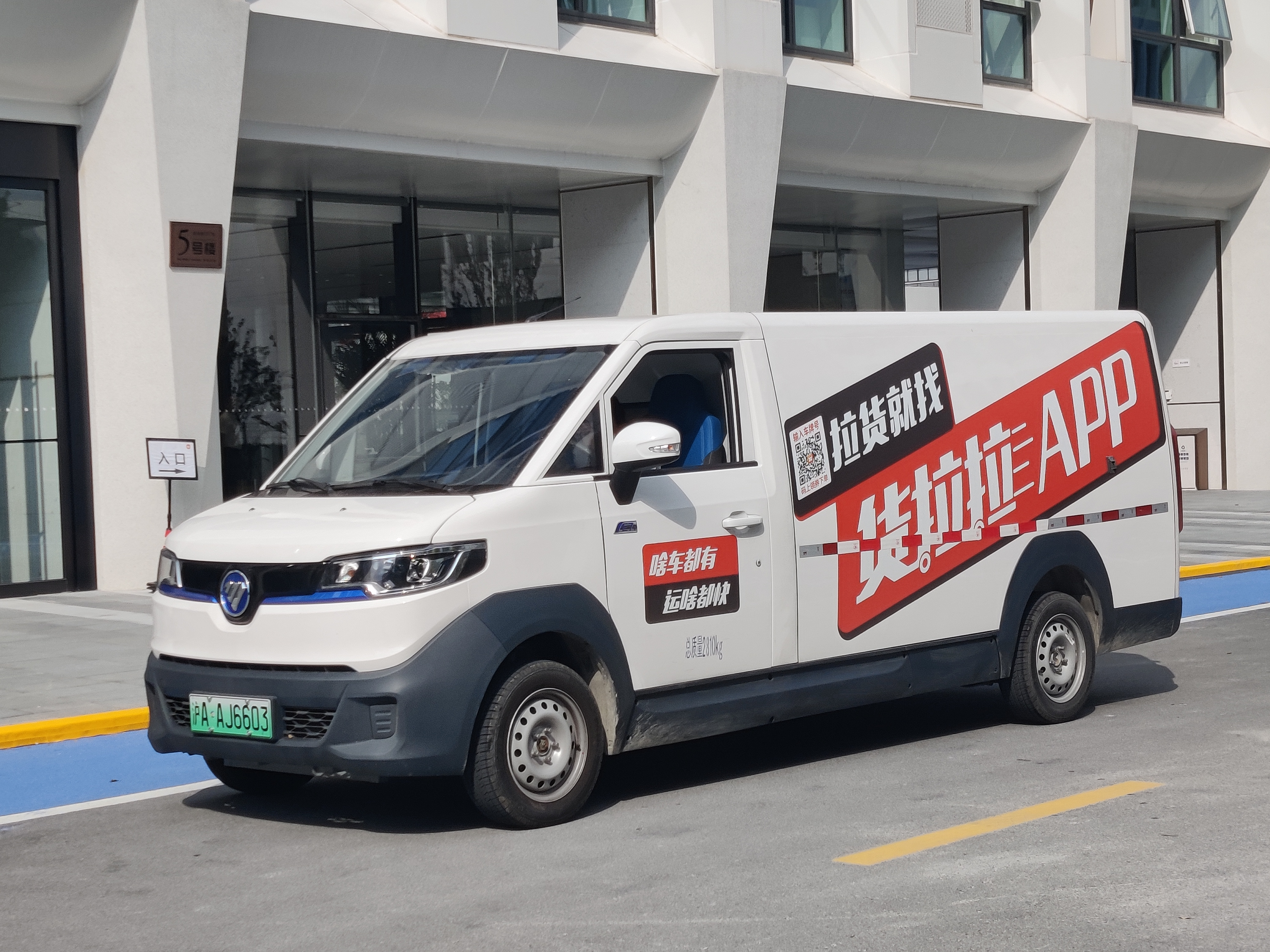
- The Foton Smart Smurf E7 in Shanghai.

Overview
- Manufacturer: Foton Motor
- Also called: JMC E-Lushun; REACH Xin V70; Gonow Aoteng
- Production: 2022–present
- Assembly: China

Body and chassis
- Class: Light commercial vehicle (M)
- Body style: 4/5-door van
- Layout: Front-engine, front-wheel-drive

Powertrain
- Electric motor: Permanent magnet synchronous motor

Dimensions
- Wheelbase: 3,350 mm (131.9 in) (E7 / JMC E-Lushun); 2,950 mm (116.1 in) (E5)
- Length: 5,395 mm (212.4 in) (E7); 4,535 mm (178.5 in) (E5); 5,418 mm (213.3 in) (JMC E-Lushun); 5,428 mm (213.7 in) (Gonow Aoteng)
- Width: 1,780 mm (70.1 in)
- Height: 1,950 mm (76.8 in) (E7 / JMC E-Lushun / Gonow Aoteng); 1,955 mm (77.0 in) (E5)

The Foton Smart Smurf E7 and the shorter Foton Smart Smurf E5 is a battery electric van produced by the Chinese automaker Foton since 2022.

== Overview ==
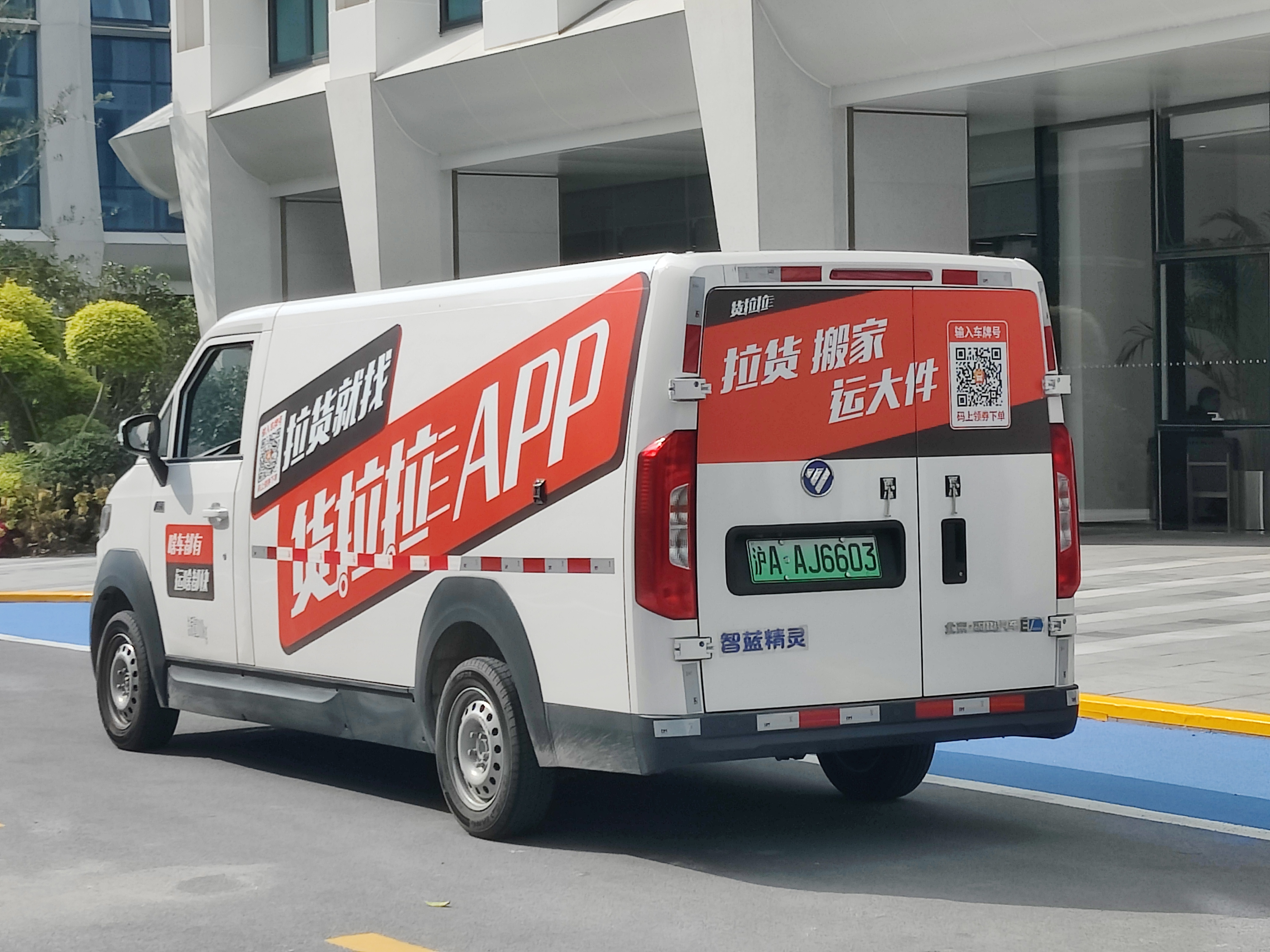
Rear view

The Smart Smurf E7 and E5 was launched in China on 1 June 2022. The Smart Smurf E7 and E5 is an fully electric urban logistics van by Foton, specially designed for the needs of urban logistics and distribution.

== Specifications ==
The Smart Smurf E7 has two CATL supplied battery variants with 48.36kWh and 38.64kWh capacity respectively supporting a range of 341 km (212 mi) and 290 km (180 mi). The Smart Smurf E5 has a 38.64kWh battery and a range of 321 km (199 mi).

== JMC E-Lushun ==
The JMC E-Lushun by Jiangling Motors is a rebadged variant of the Foton Smart Smurf E7. Launched in November 2022 for the 2023 model year, It features a 41.86 kW battery by CATL and ABS plus EBD. The electric motor has a maximum output of 110 kW and 225N·m of torque with the top speed being 90 km/h (56 mph). Maximum CLTC range is 270 km (170 mi).

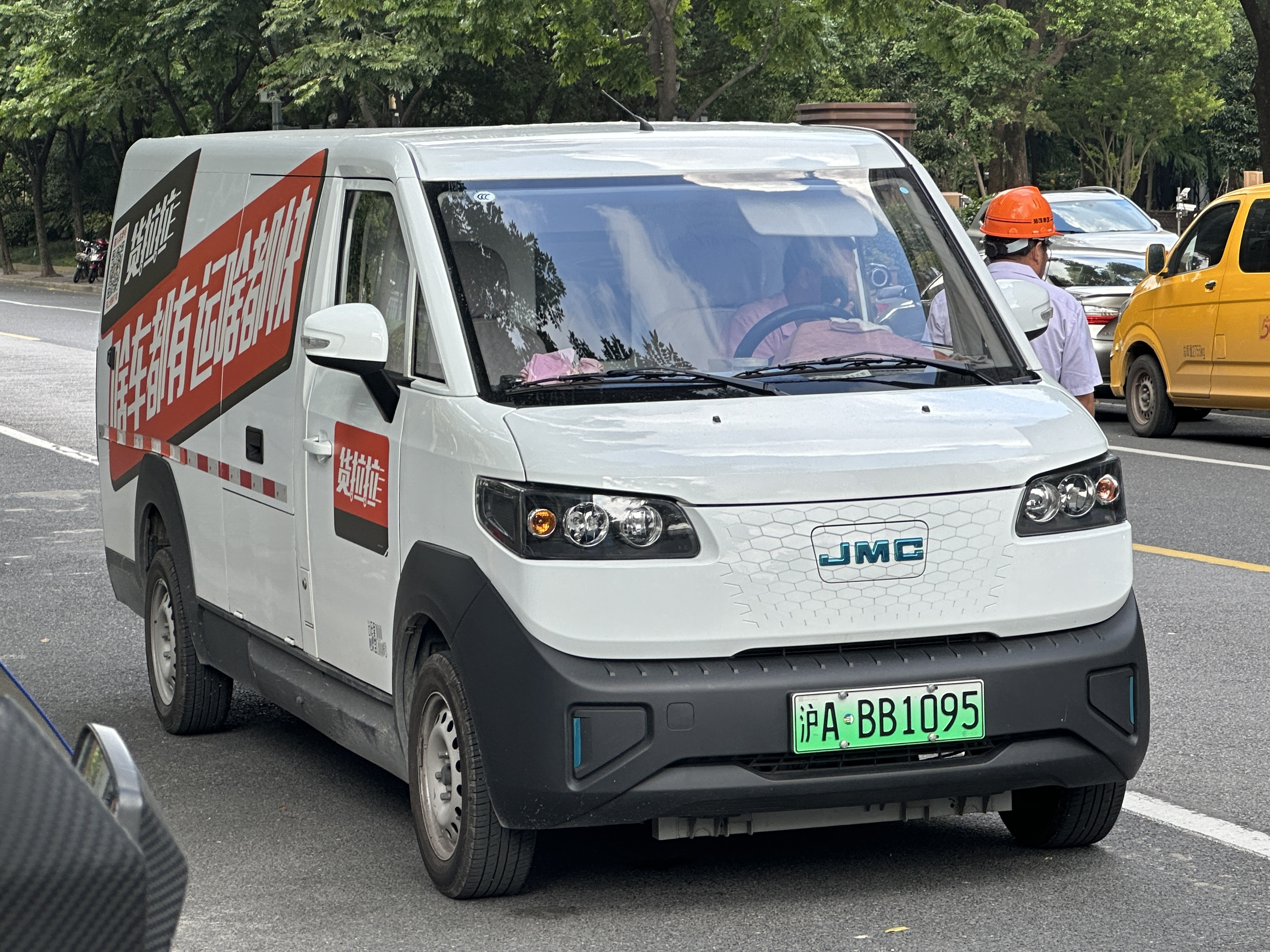
JMC E-Lushun

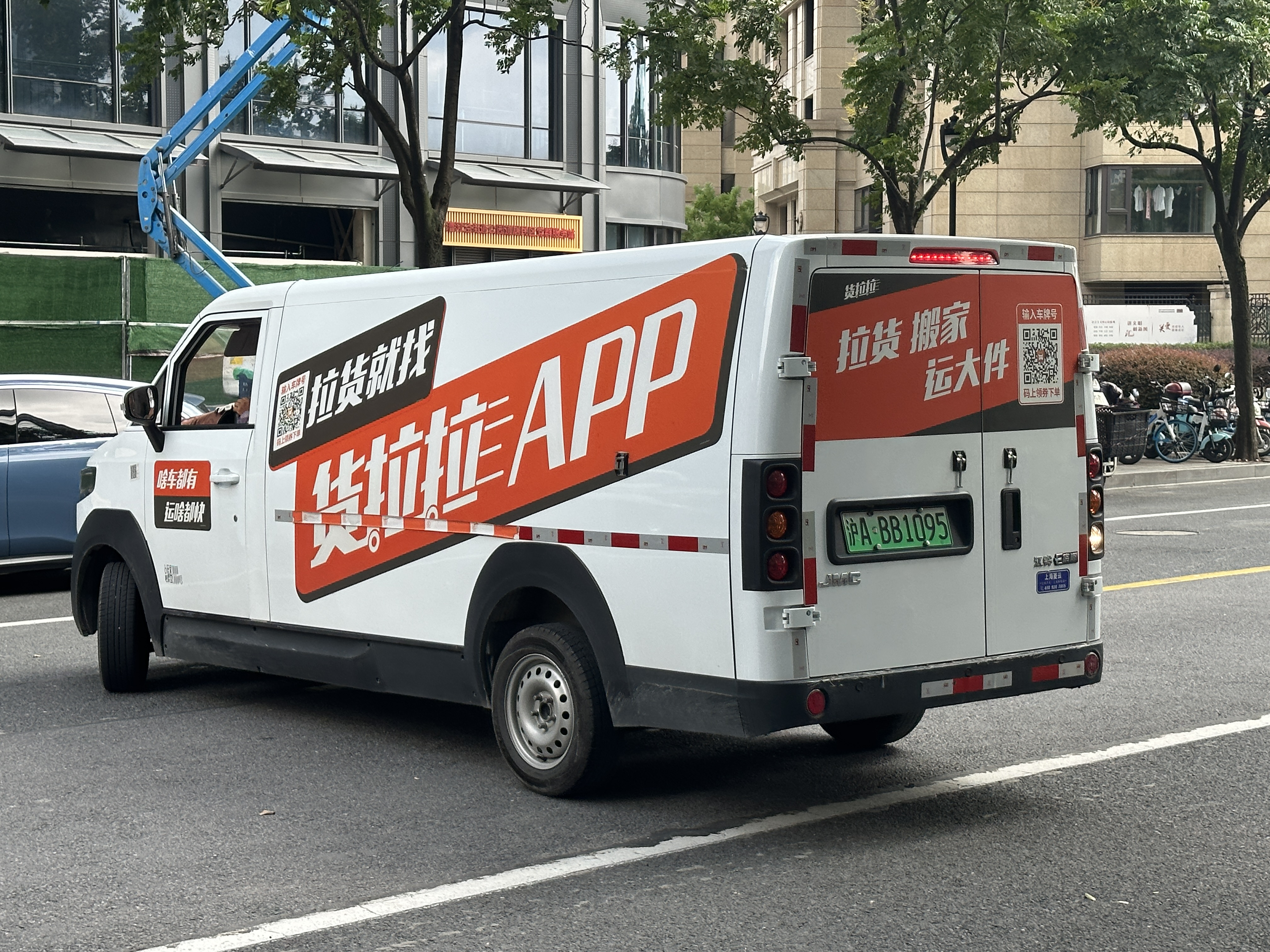
Rear view

== REACH Xin V70 ==
The REACH Xin V70 (信V70) of BAIC REACH produced by Weiqiao Pioneering Group is a rebadged variant of the Foton Smart Smurf E7. Launched in May 2024, It features a fully aluminum body. The BAIC REACH (北汽雷驰) is a new energy light commercial vehicle brand established in January 2011 focusing on the urban new energy logistics vehicle market. It is a brand under Shandong Reach New Energy Vehicle Co., Ltd., co-invested and established jointly by Shandong Weiqiao Pioneering Group, Beijing Automotive Manufacturing Factory, and Linyi City Development Group.

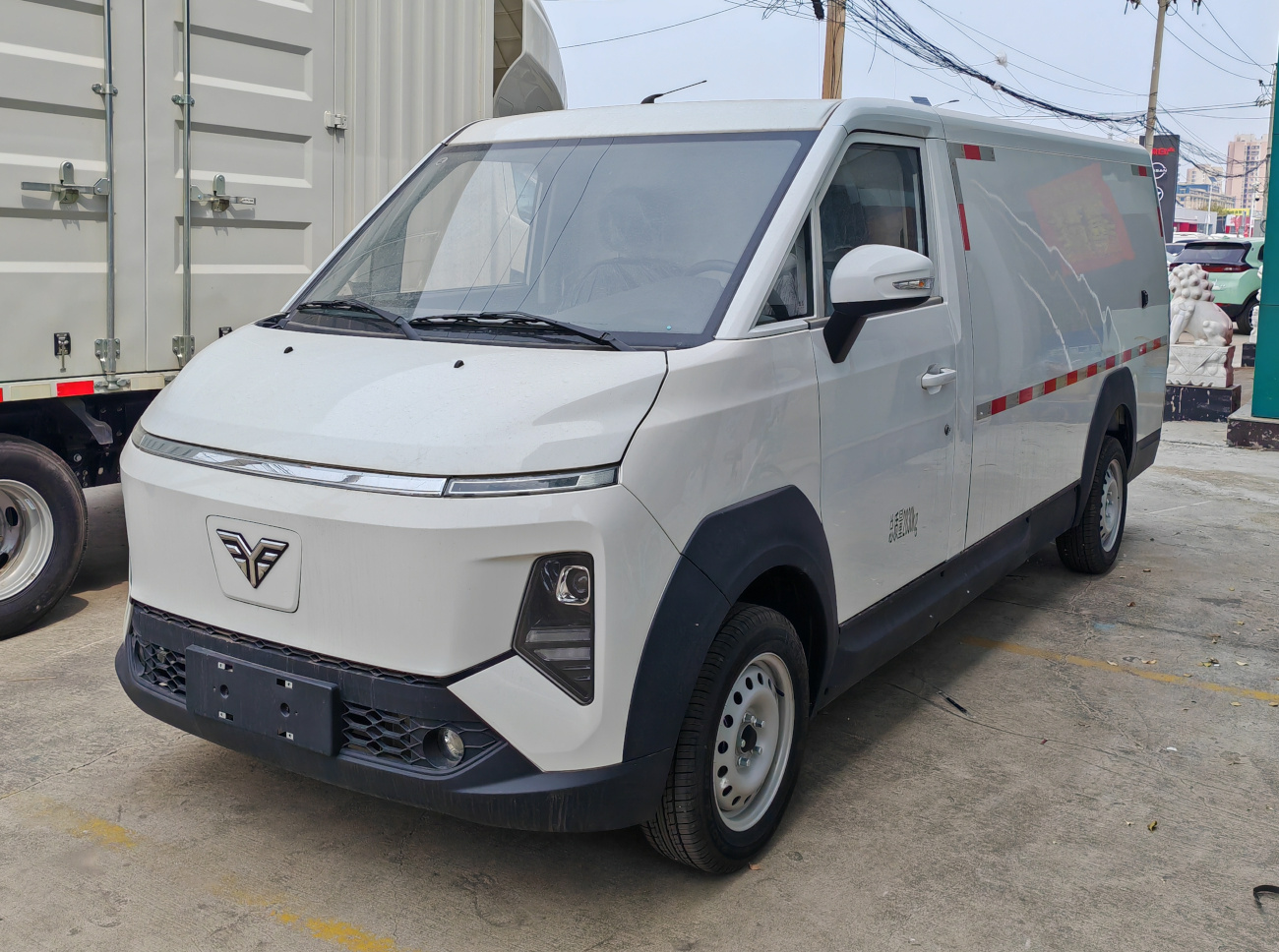
REACH Xin V70

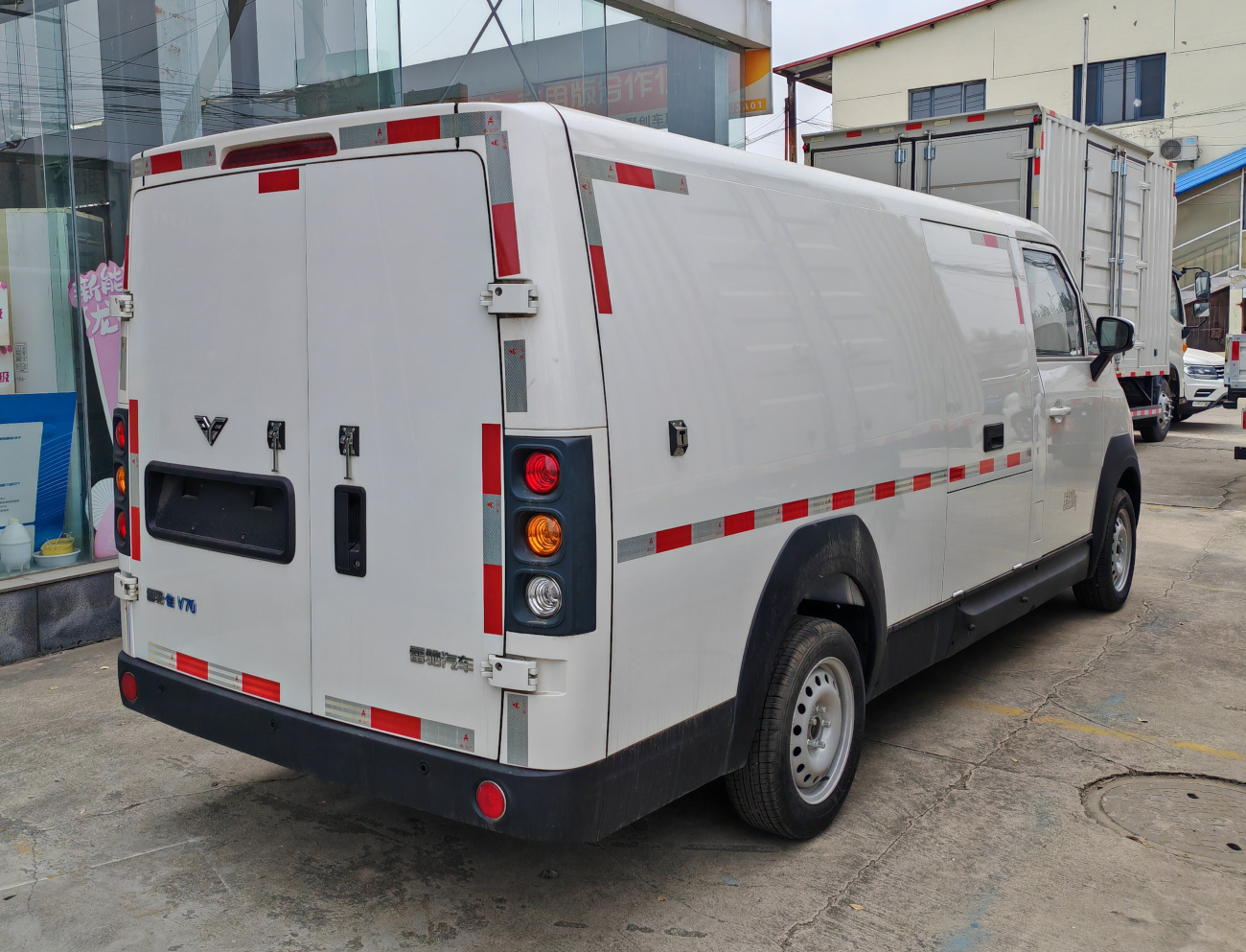
Rear view

== Gonow Aoteng ==
The Gonow Aoteng (新吉奥 奥腾) is a pure electric logistics panel van sold by New Gonow is another rebadged electric variant of the Foton Smart Smurf E7. The Aoteng battery options are CATL supplied 50.23kWh, Suzhou Yuliang Battery Co., Ltd. supplied 45.33kWh, and Gotion High tech Co Ltd supplied 41.93kWh Lithium Iron Phosphate Batteries with the maximum pure electric CLTC range of 305km.
