= BAW Yusheng =

Chinese compact sports utility vehicle

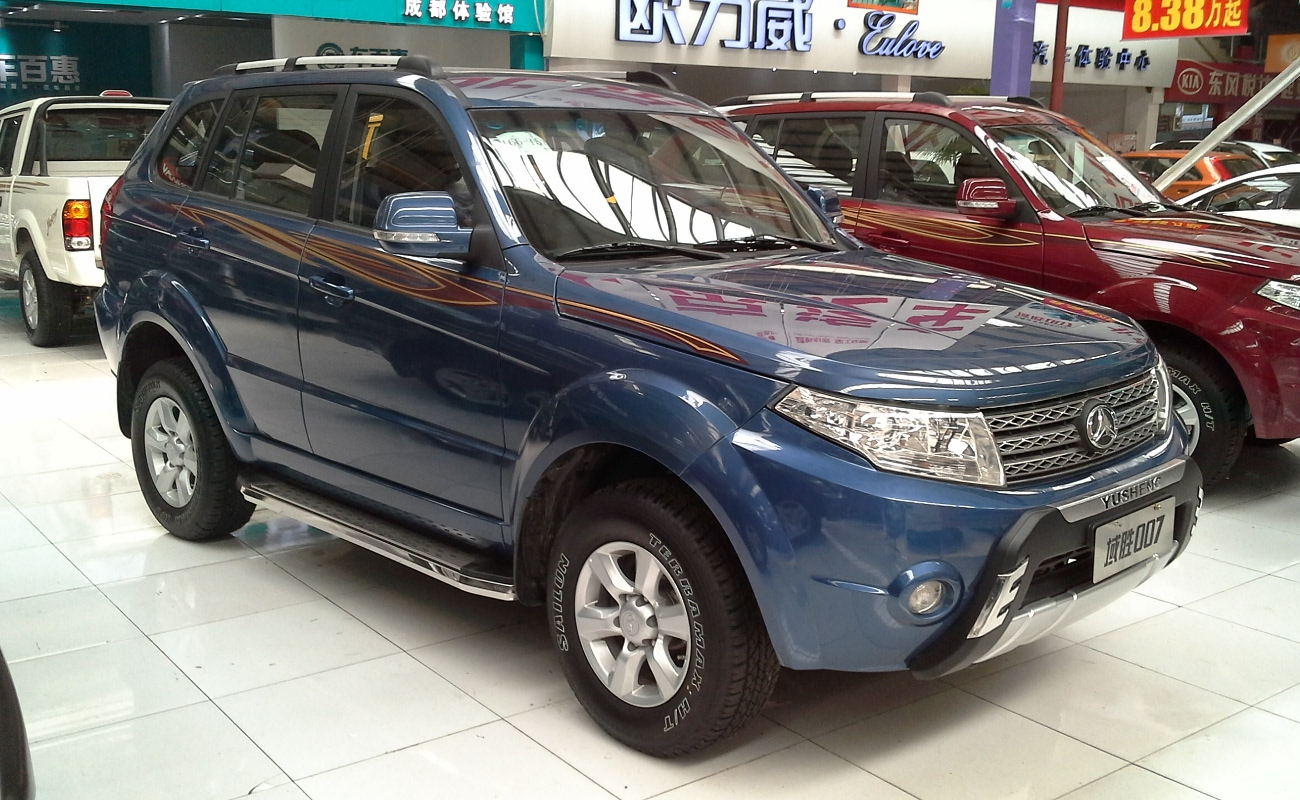

Overview
- Manufacturer: BAW
- Also called: BAW BW007; BAW Ruiling (pickup)
- Production: 2010–2017
- Model years: 2010–2017

Body and chassis
- Class: Compact SUV pickup
- Body style: 5-door wagon 4-door pickup

Powertrain
- Engine: 2.0 L 4G20 I4 (petrol); 2.0 L 4G63 I4 (turbo petrol); 2.4 L G4CA I4 (petrol)
- Transmission: 6 speed manual 5 speed manual 4 speed automatic

Dimensions
- Wheelbase: 2,600 mm (102.4 in)
- Length: 4,595 mm (180.9 in)
- Width: 1,828 mm (72.0 in)
- Height: 1,804 mm (71.0 in)

Chronology
- Predecessor: BAW Luba

The BAW Yusheng (北汽BAW 域胜007) or BAW BW007 (Chinese: 北京汽车制造厂-北京BW007), is a compact sports utility vehicle (SUV) produced by the Chinese manufacturer BAW from September 2010, and launched in 2011.

== Overview ==
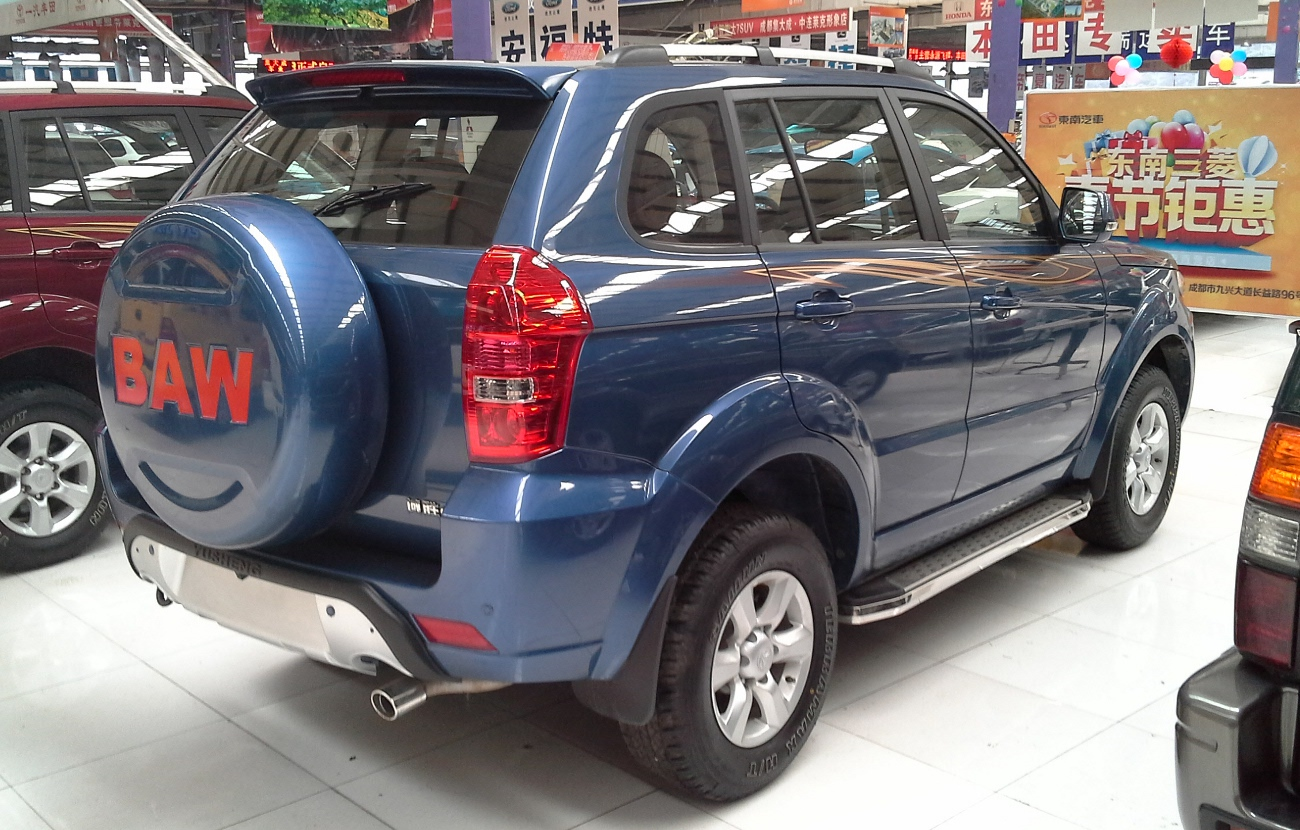
BAW Yusheng 007 rear

Debuting during the 2010 Beijing Auto Show, price range of the BAW BW007 ranges from 89,800 yuan to 12,800 yuan at launch, and was adjusted to 82,800 yuan to 107,800 yuan later in the market.

The BAW BW007 was developed from 2007 when BAW still produce Jeeps in the Beijing-Jeep joint venture. Early prototypes were based on Jeep platforms, and initial styling of the prototypes resembles Jeep-branded vehicles. It has a 2.4 liter engine producing 105 kW (141 hp) and 217 N⋅m (160 lb⋅ft).

News of a facelift was revealed in 2013. Known updates for the BAW BW007 facelift are mainly focused on the interior, with the center console updated to resemble that of the Range Rovers.

== BAW Ruiling pickup ==
The BAW Ruiling pickup (锐铃) is a pickup based on the BW007 SUV. It was revealed during the 2012 Beijing Auto Show with a length of 5088mm, a width of 1820mm and a height of 1804mm. The wheelbase is longer than the BW007 at 2735mm. Curb weight of the BAW Ruiling pickup is 2735kg, and max load is 1910kg.

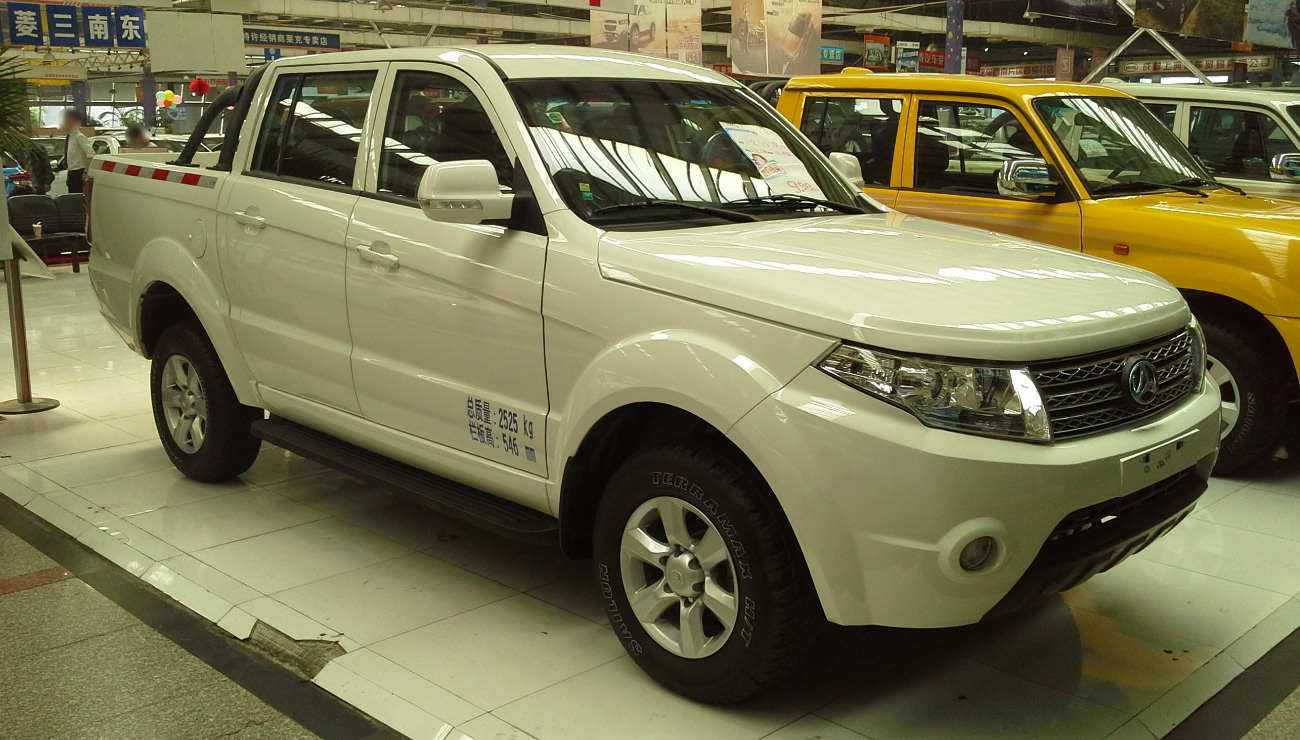
BAW Ruiling

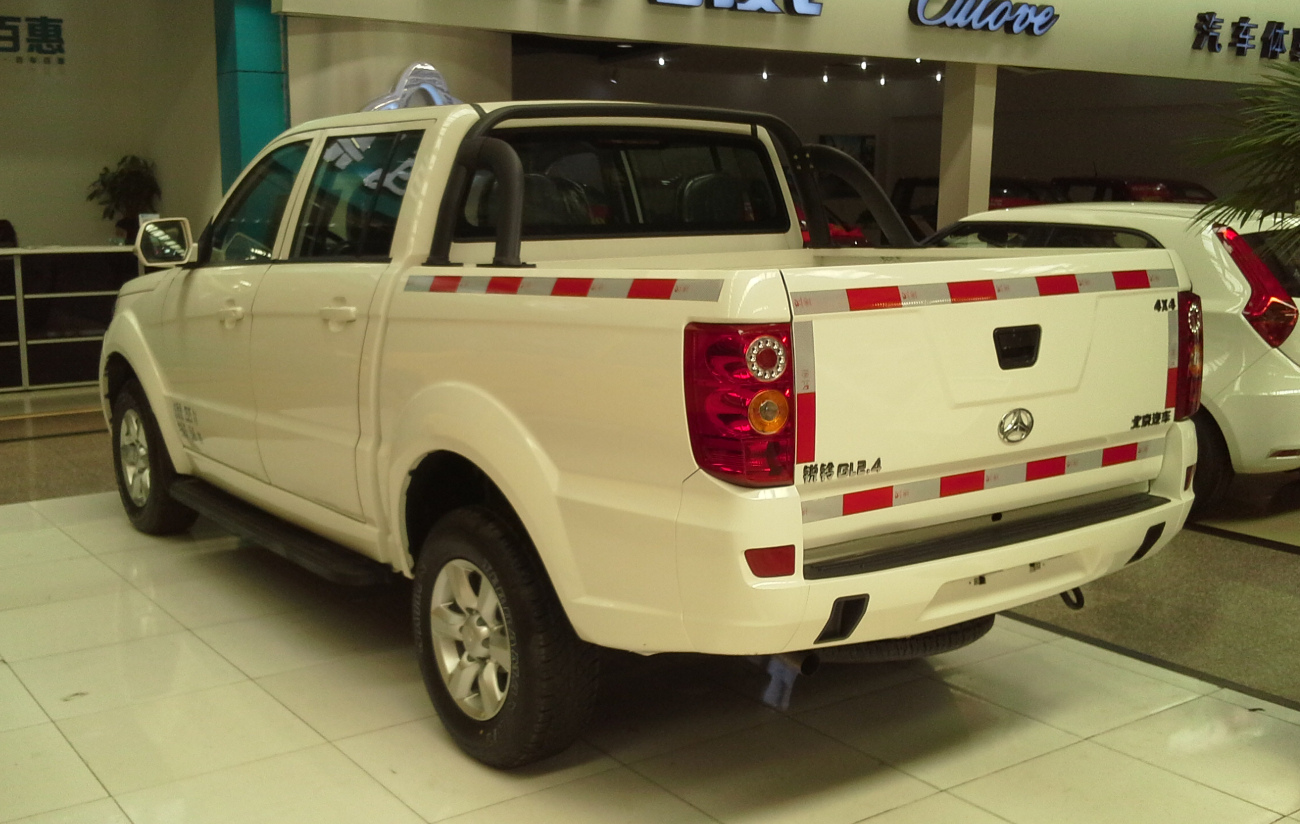
BAW Ruiling rear
