= BAW Yuanbao =

Battery electric city car

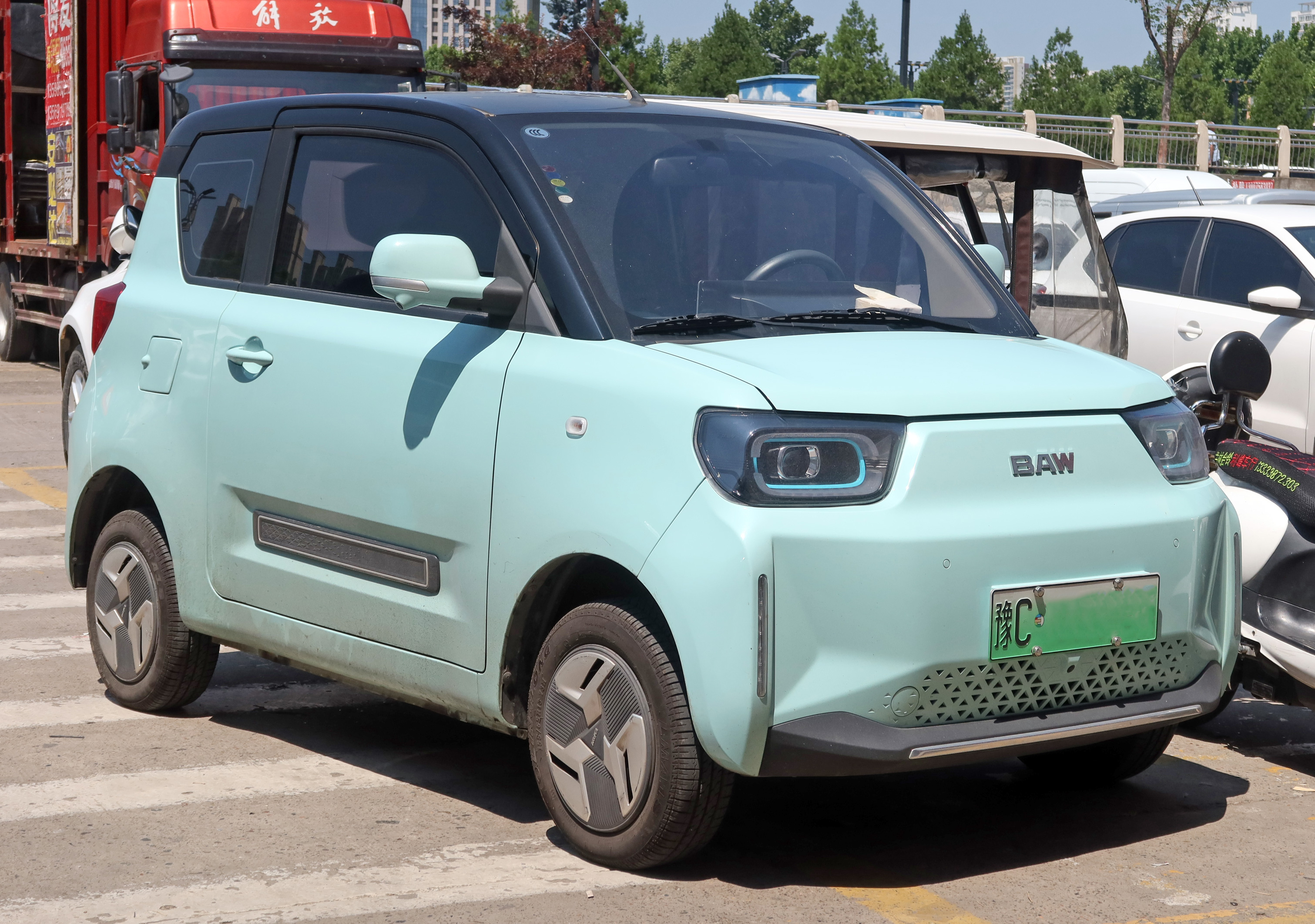

Overview
- Manufacturer: BAW
- Also called: BAW Change Mini EV; BAW Yanling S3; BAW S3; BAW Pony (Europe); BAW 1 (Italy); Allview CityZEN (Romania); Invicta Pony (Spain); ElBlesk Pony (Czech Republic); Relive N1 (Turkey); Swipp (Norway)
- Production: 2021–present
- Assembly: China

Body and chassis
- Class: City car (A)
- Body style: 3-door hatchback
- Layout: Rear-motor, rear-wheel-drive

Powertrain
- Electric motor: Permanent magnet synchronous motor
- Power output: 20 kW (27 hp; 27 PS)
- Transmission: 1-speed direct-drive
- Battery: Li-ion phosphate battery: 9.6-13.6 kWh

Dimensions
- Wheelbase: 2,050 mm (80.7 in)
- Length: 3,162 mm (124.5 in)
- Width: 1,498 mm (59.0 in)
- Height: 1,585 mm (62.4 in)

The BAW Yuanbao (Chinese: 北汽制造 元宝) is a battery electric city car manufactured by BAW since 2021. Originally launched as the Change Mini EV, the model was later relaunched as the Yanling S3 and later, as the Yuanbao in 2022.

== Overview ==
The Yuanbao was first launched in September 2021 as the BAW Change Mini EV, named after Chinese moon goddess Chang'e. It was discovered that the Change Mini EV was later renamed as the BAW Yanling S3 by April 2022 despite already being sold as the Change Mini EV in the Chinese market. At the same time, the official marketing campaign continue to tease as the upcoming model as the BAW S3 and BAW Yuanbao. The Yuanbao was intended to be a competitor of the slightly smaller and similarly shaped Wuling Hongguang Mini EV and Chery QQ Ice Cream.

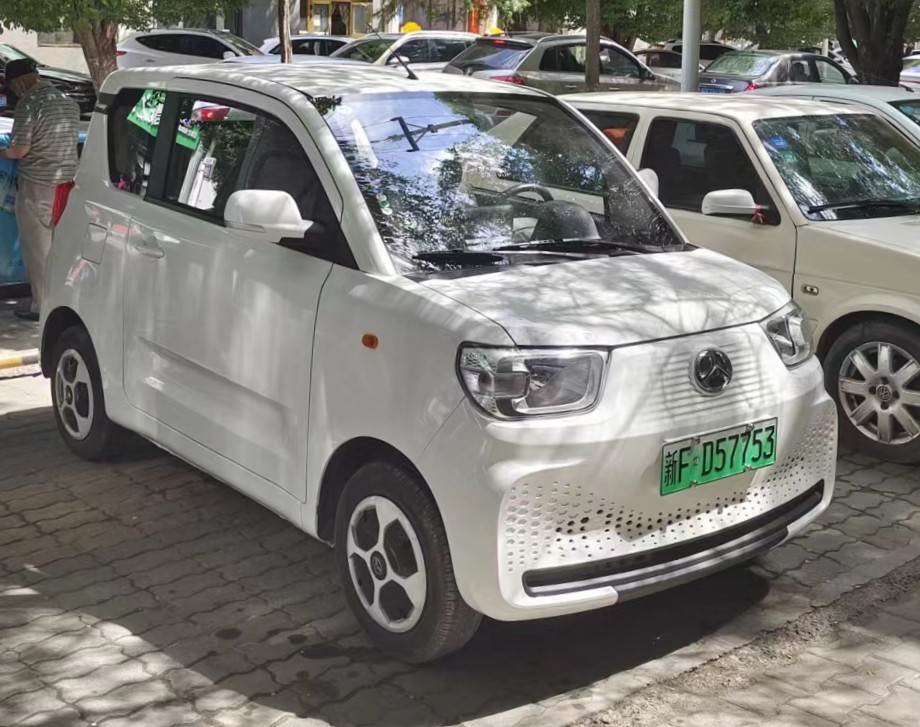
BAW Change Mini EV

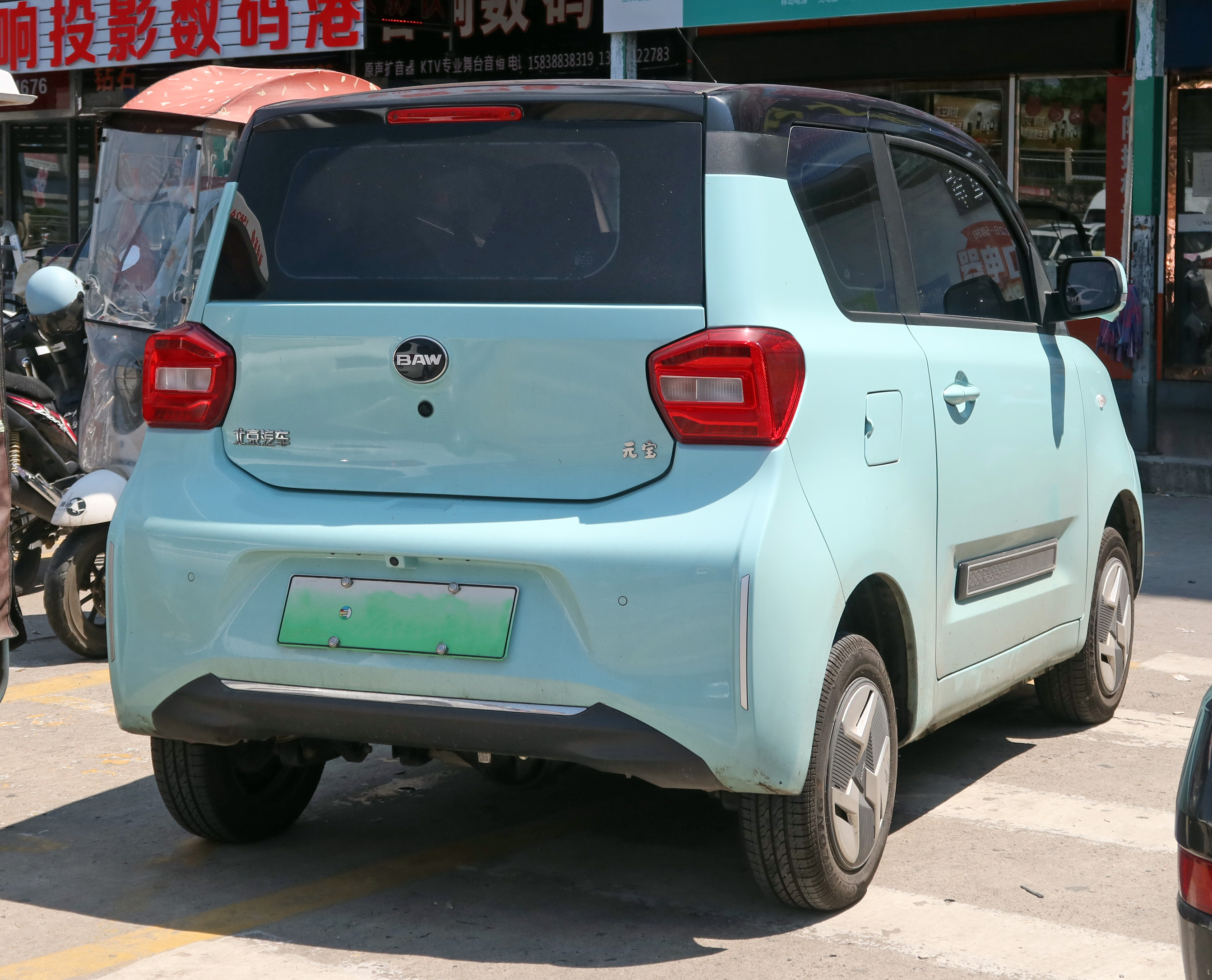
Rear view

== Specifications ==
The Yuanbao is equipped with a li-ion battery with two electric range variants capable of a range of 120 km (75 mi) and 170 km (110 mi) respectively. The front suspensions are MacPherson struts and the rear suspensions are multi-link suspensions.
