= BAW Qishi =

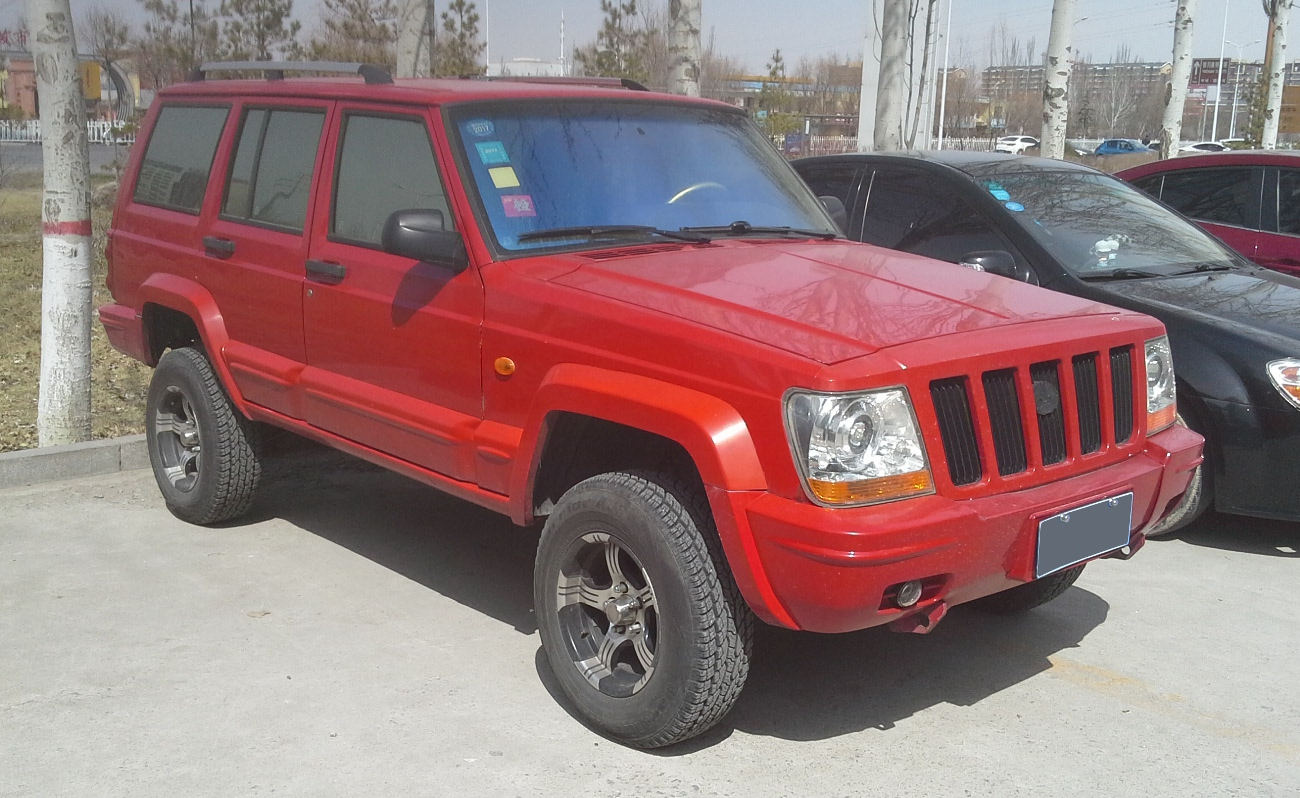

Overview
- Manufacturer: BAW
- Production: 2009–2014
- Assembly: China: Beijing

Body and chassis
- Class: Compact SUV
- Body style: 4-door SUV
- Layout: Front-engine, rear-wheel drive / Four-wheel drive
- Related: Jeep Cherokee

Powertrain
- Engine: 2.0 L I4 (petrol); 2.2 L I4 (diesel)
- Power output: 90–104 kW (121–139 hp)
- Transmission: 5-speed manual

Dimensions
- Wheelbase: 2,575 mm (101.4 in)
- Length: 4,300 mm (169.3 in)
- Width: 1,790 mm (70.5 in)
- Height: 1,700 mm (66.9 in)
- Curb weight: 1,545–1,610 kg (3,406–3,549 lb)

The BAW Qishi is a compact SUV that was produced by the Chinese manufacturer BAW from 2009 to 2014. It was based on the Jeep 2500/2700, which was manufactured at the Beijing Jeep Corporation from 2003 to about 2008.

== Overview ==
The main differences between the Jeep 2500 and BAW Qishi is that the Jeep 2500 features a 7-slot grille while the Qishi has a 5-slot grille. The technical basis for both the BAW Qishi and Jeep 2500 was the Jeep Cherokee. From its predecessor, the Qishi differed externally, especially by the differently designed radiator grille.

The vehicle was available with two-wheel and four-wheel drive.

As part of a facelift 2011, the Qishi S-12 was presented. In addition to lighter retouching at the front and rear, the suspension came from Isuzu for reasons of cost reduction.
