= LS5 =

LS5 may refer to:

- CS/LS5, a Chinese submachine gun
- Hongqi LS5, a 2015–2017 Chinese government-only full-size SUV
- Panasonic Lumix DMC-LS5, a digital camera
- Rolladen-Schneider LS5, a German single seat glider
- LS5, callsign of Radio Rivadavia, Argentina
