= Beijing Auto Museum =

Automotive museum in Beijing, China

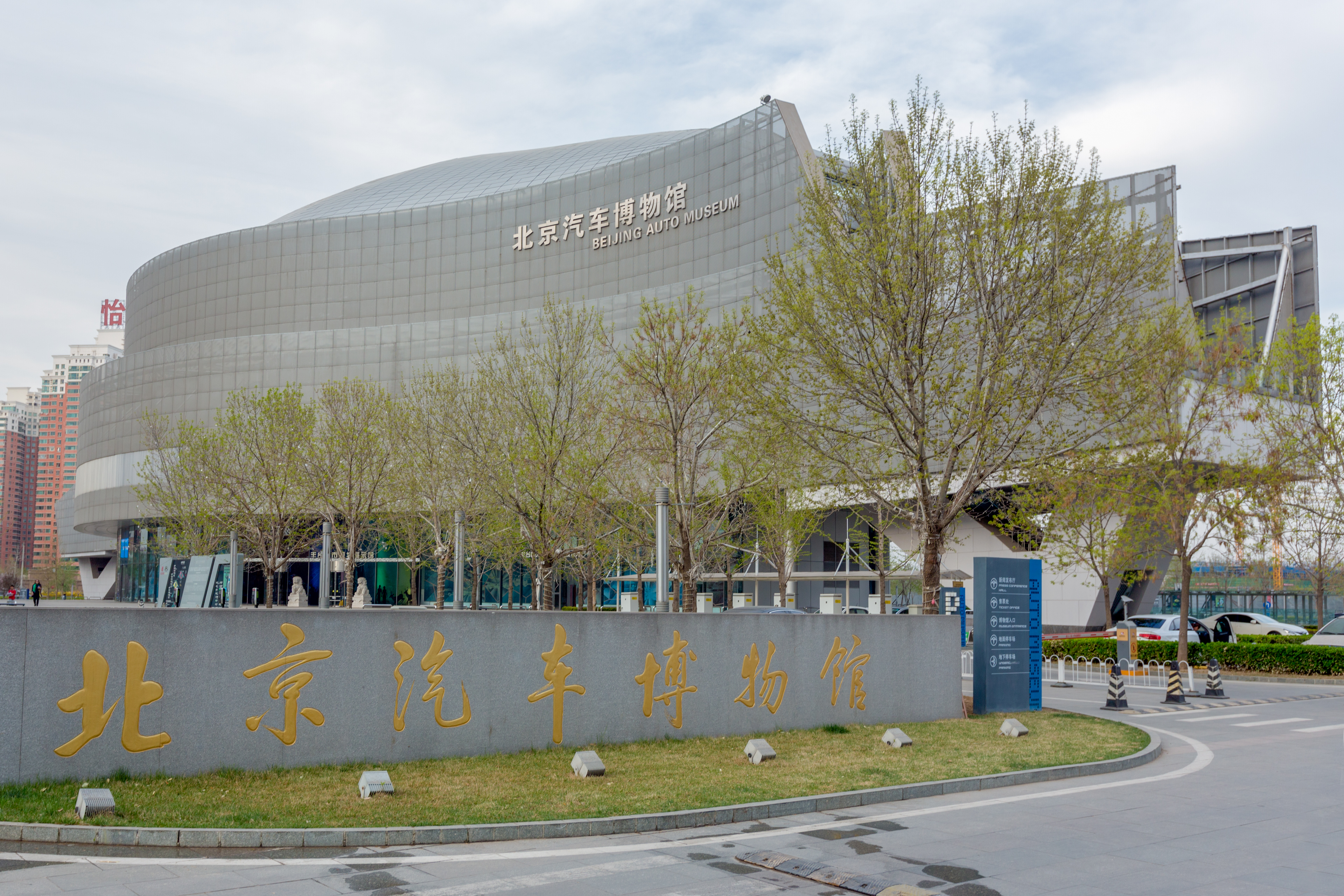
- Beijing Auto Museum in April 2016
- Established: 2011; 15 years ago
- Location: Beijing, China
- Type: Car museum
- Collections: Automobiles, motorcycles, trucks and buses
- Collection size: 80 (2014)

The Beijing Auto Museum is an automotive museum in Beijing, China, which opened in 2011. With 50,000 square meters (540,000 sq ft) and 5 floors, it is the largest auto museum in China.

== History ==
The Beijing Auto Museum began construction in 2006, and the building was completed in 2010. It was officially opened to the public the next year, in 2011.

On May 18, 2019, the Beijing Auto Museum was recognized by the Chinese Museums Association out of over 5,000 other museums in the country as the "most innovative museum in China".

== Collection ==
In 2014, the collection of cars in the Beijing Auto Museum numbered 80. However, several of the cars in the collection are replicas, such as the Benz Patent-Motorwagen. Domestic vehicles on display include state cars from Hongqi, military jeeps from Beijing Automobile Works, and replica Dongfanghong and Dongfeng civilian cars.

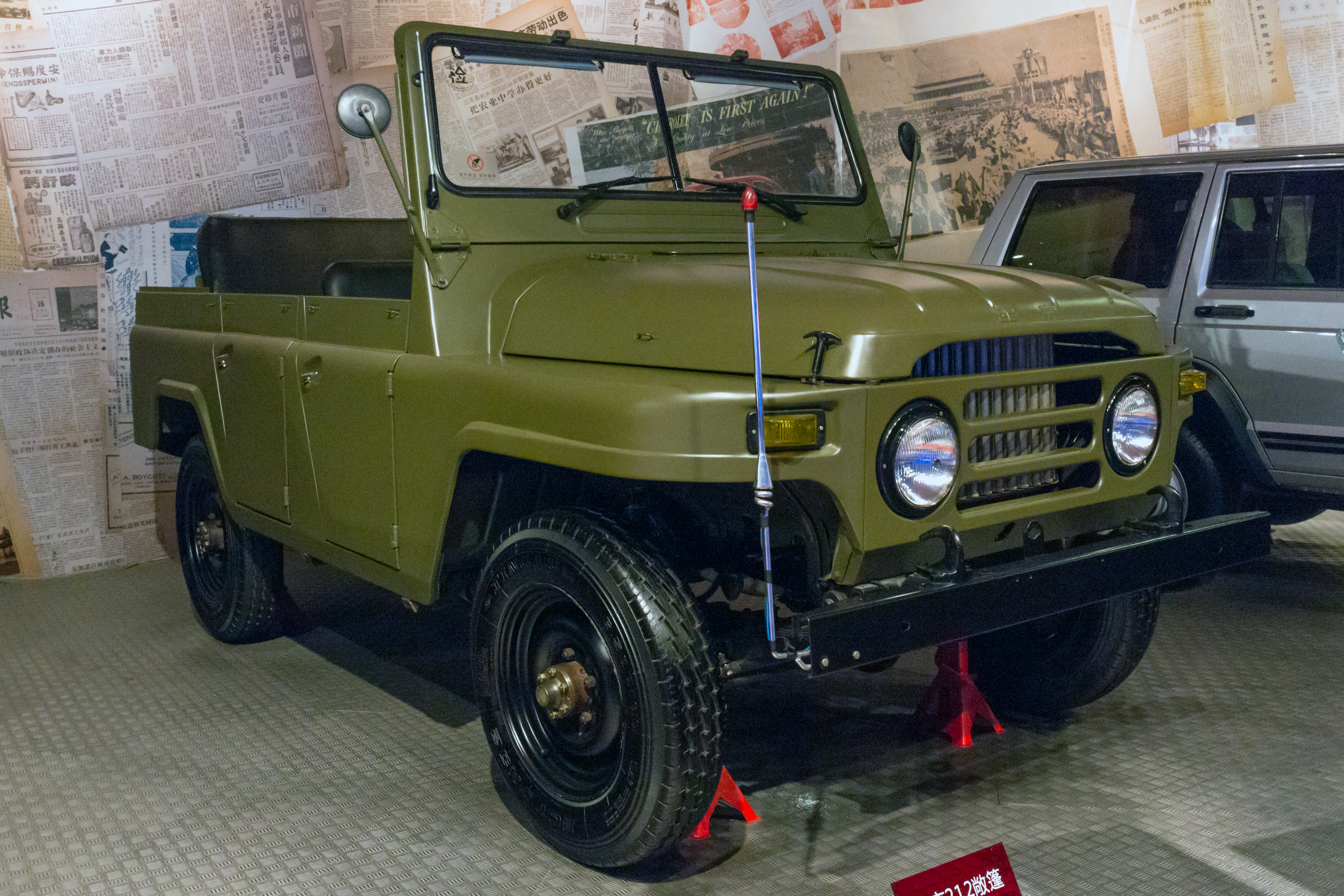
1974 Beijing BJ212

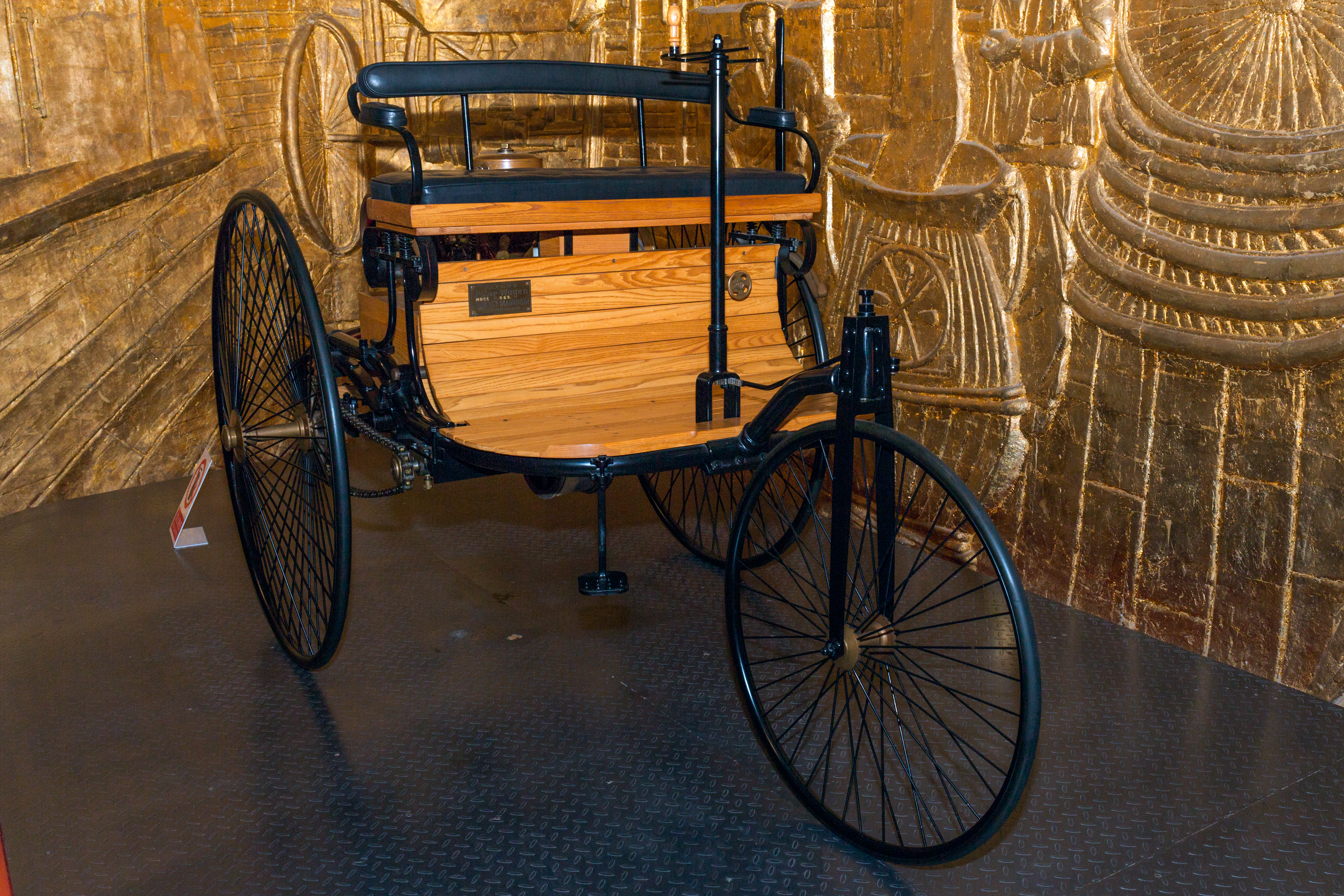
1886 Benz Patent-Motorwagen (replica)

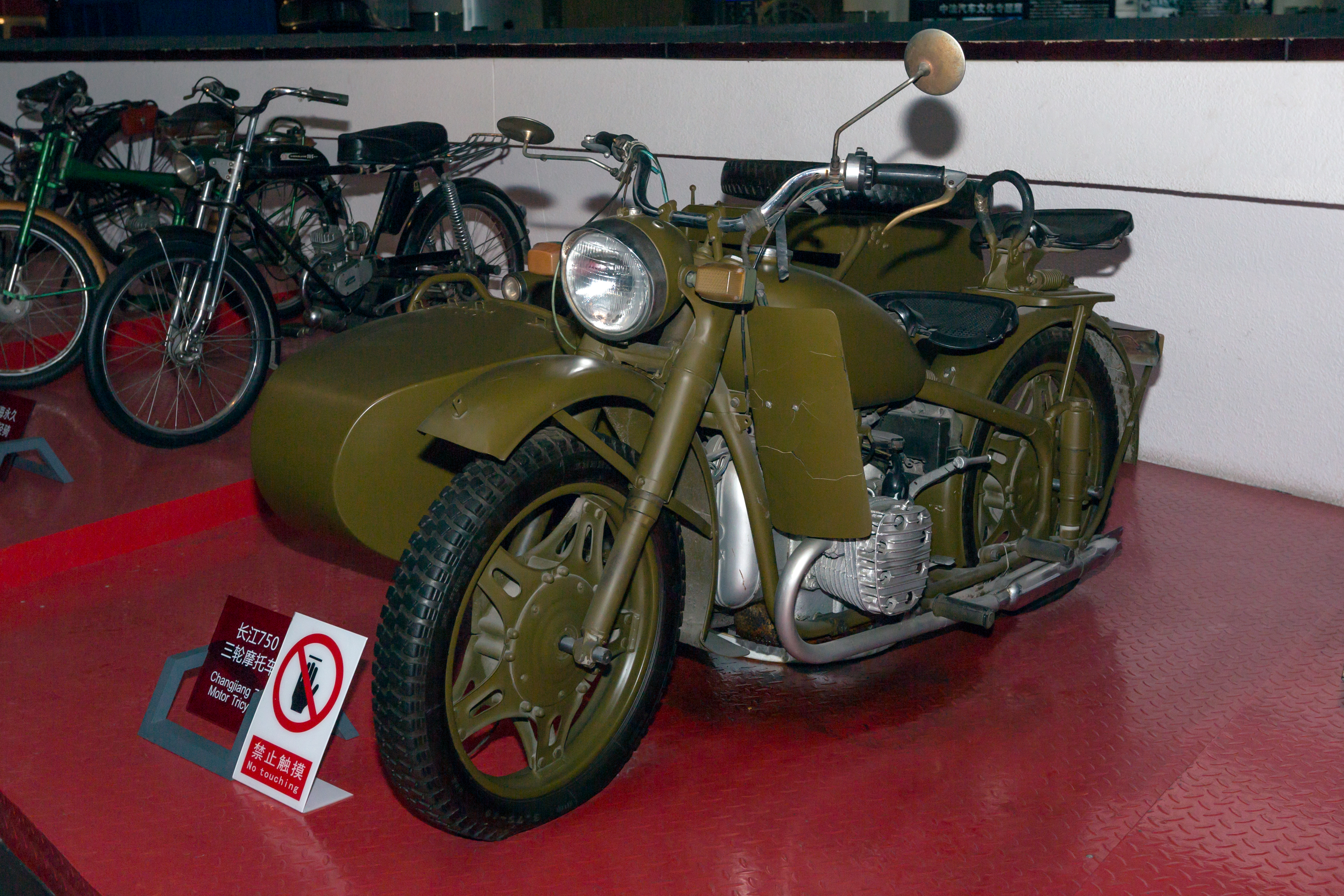
1957 Chang Jiang CJ750

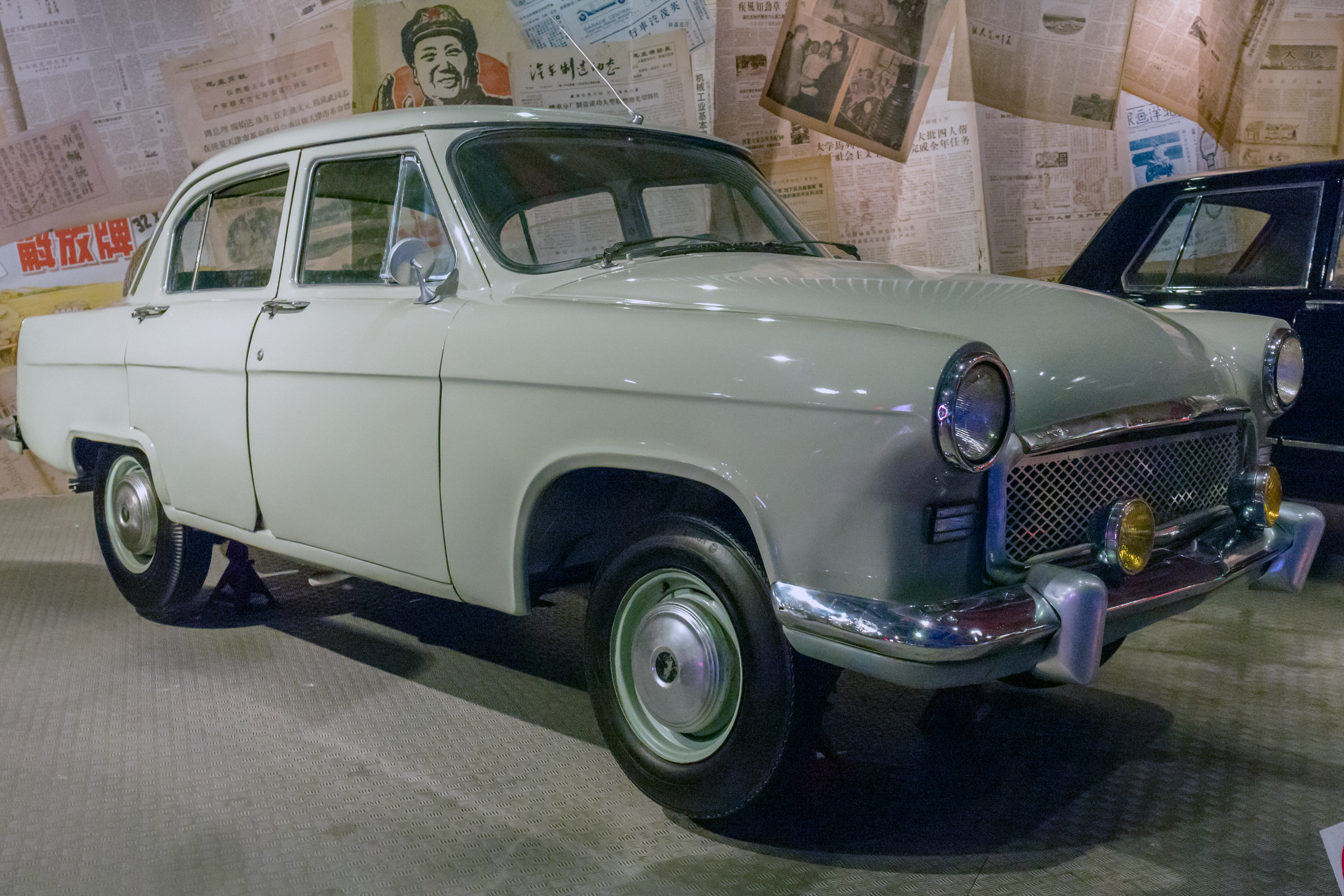
1960 Dongfanghong BJ760 (replica)

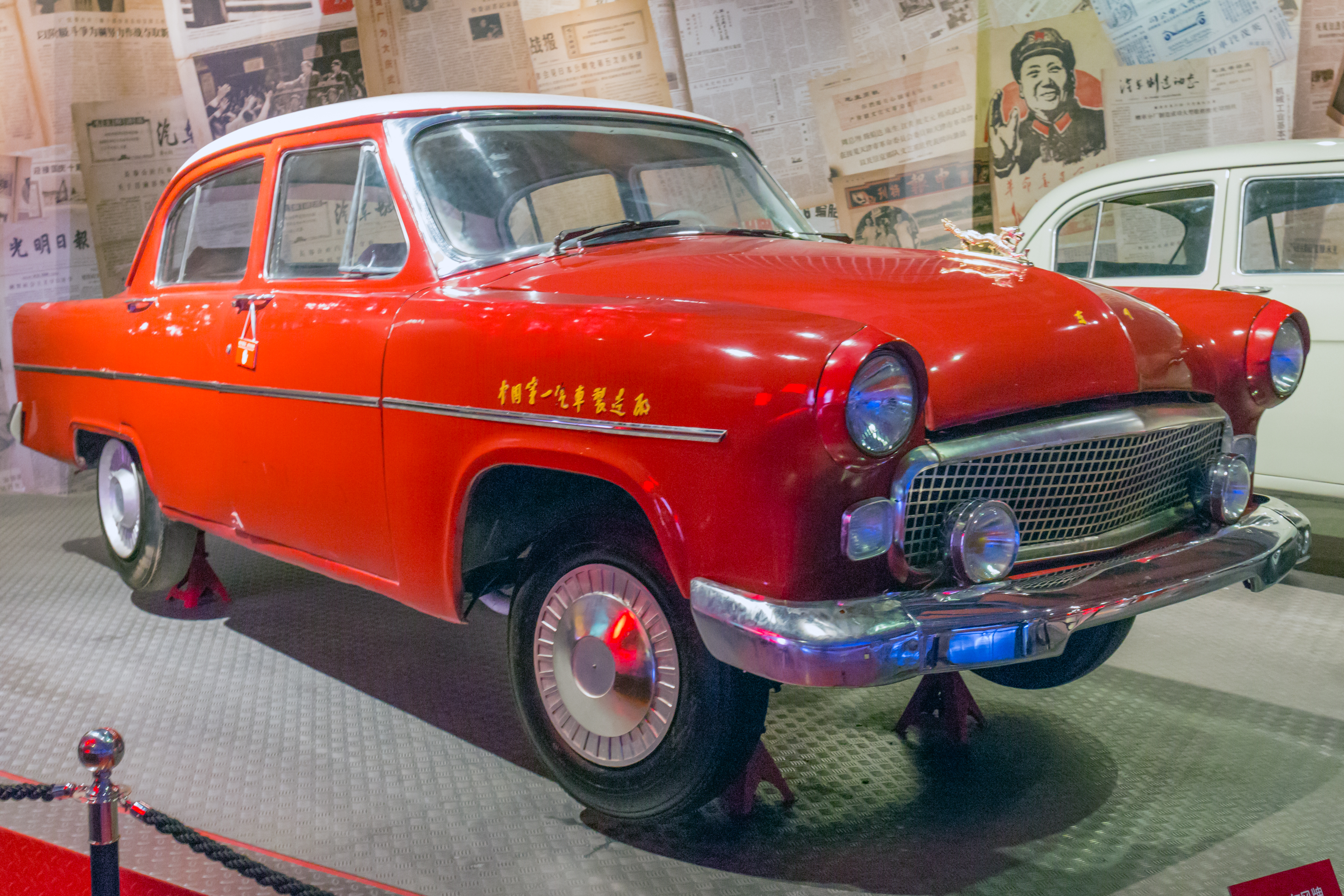
1958 Dongfeng CA71 (replica)

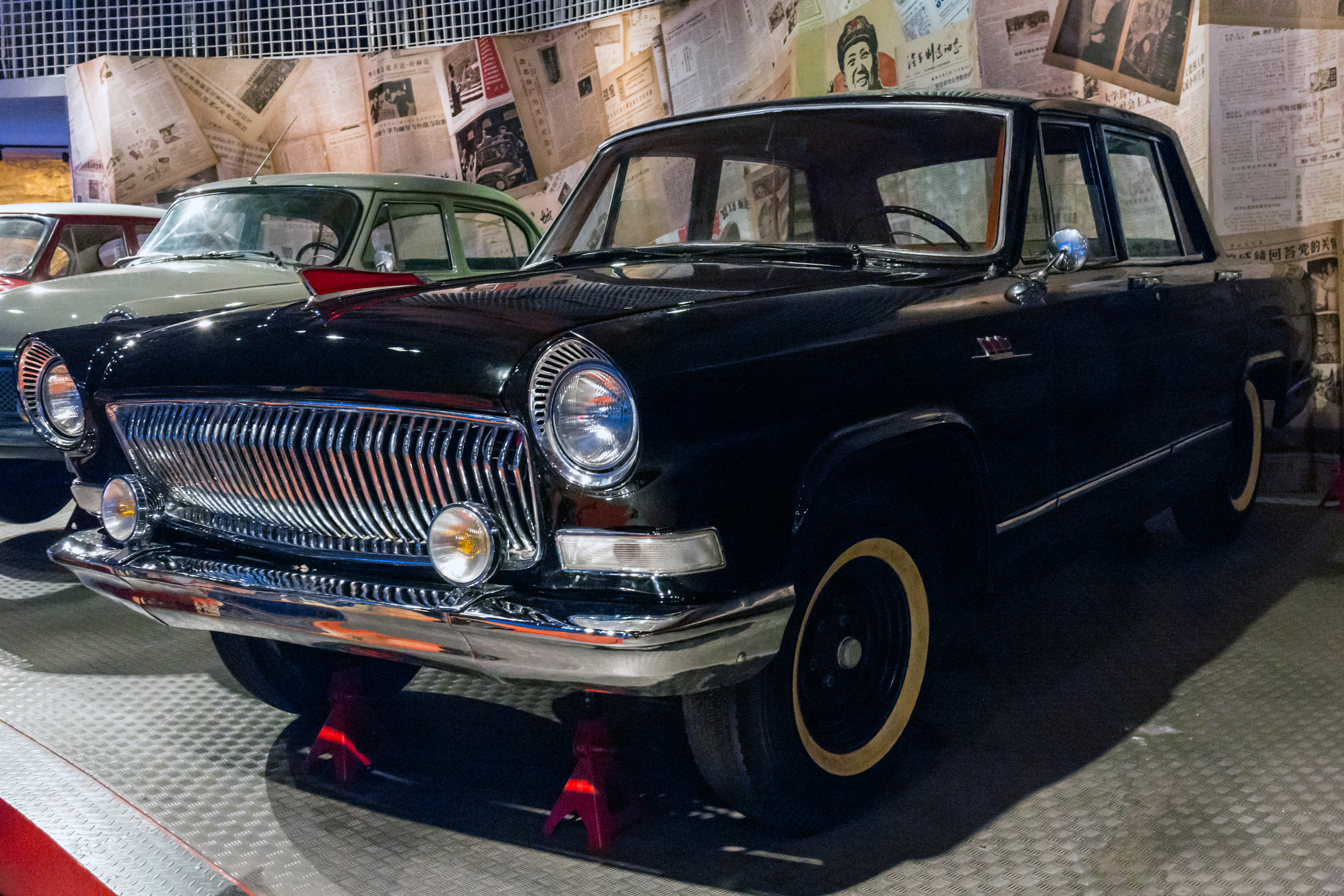
1968 Hongqi CA773

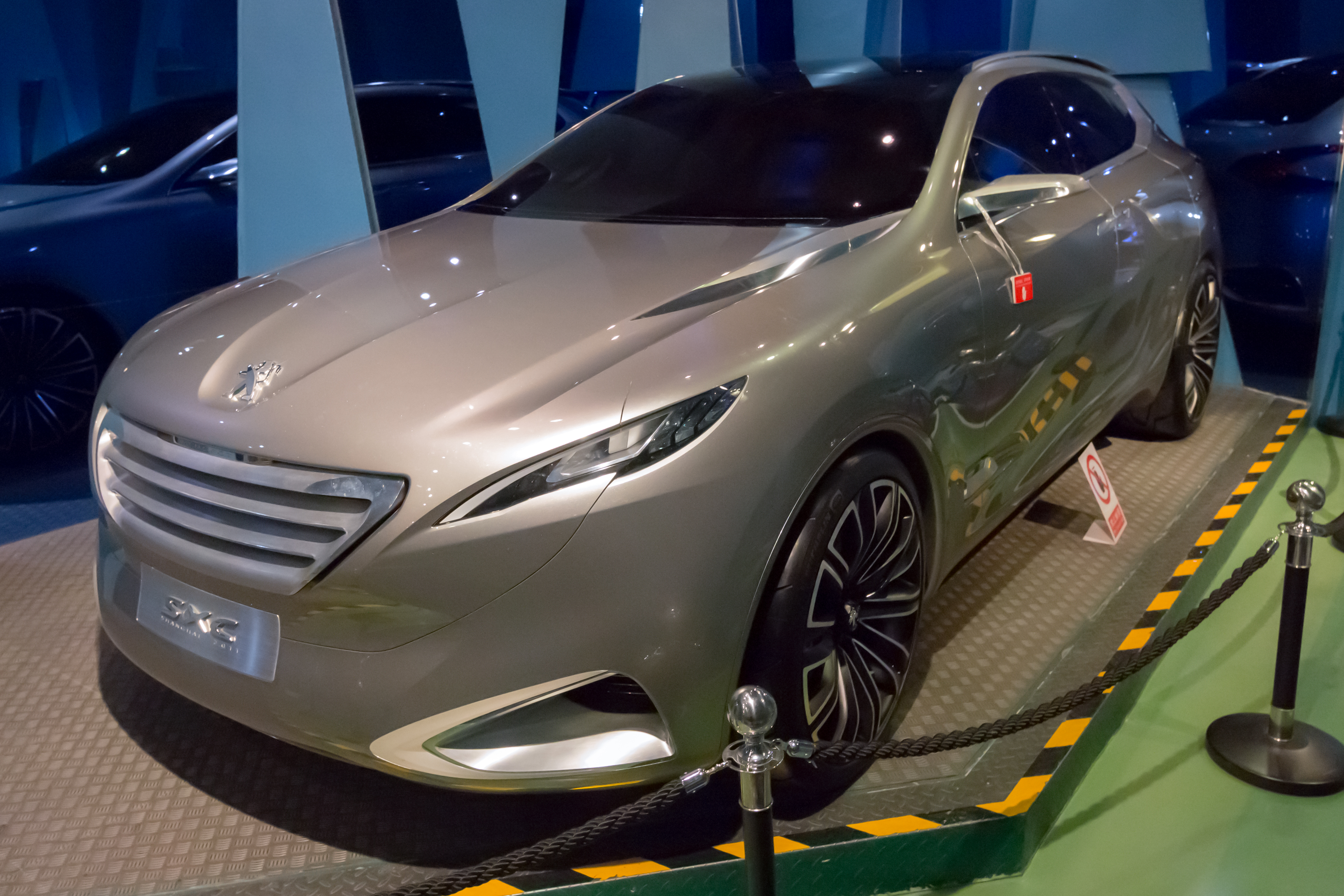
2011 Peugeot SxC concept

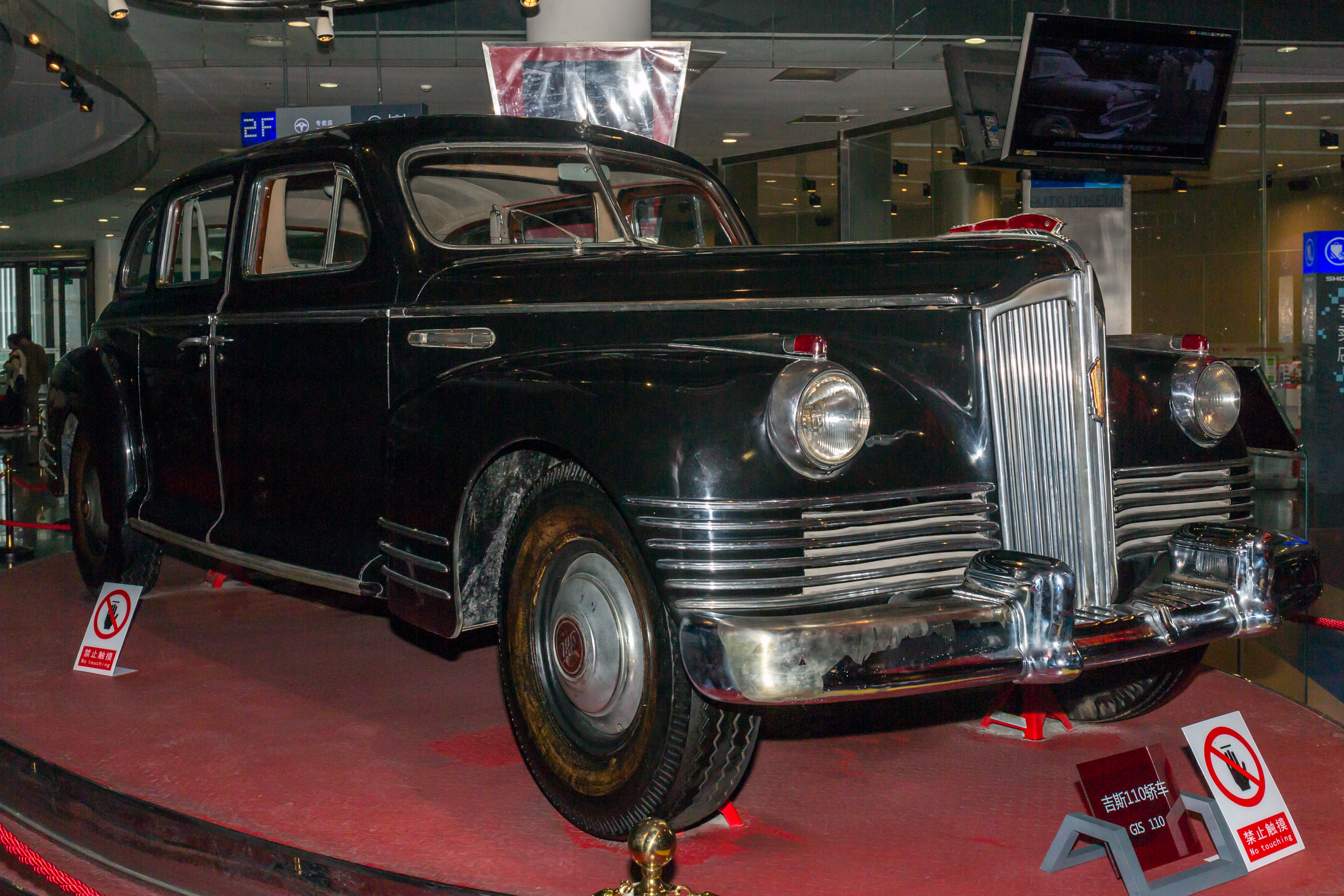
1946 ZIS-110
