= Hongqi LS5 =

Chinese full-size luxury SUV

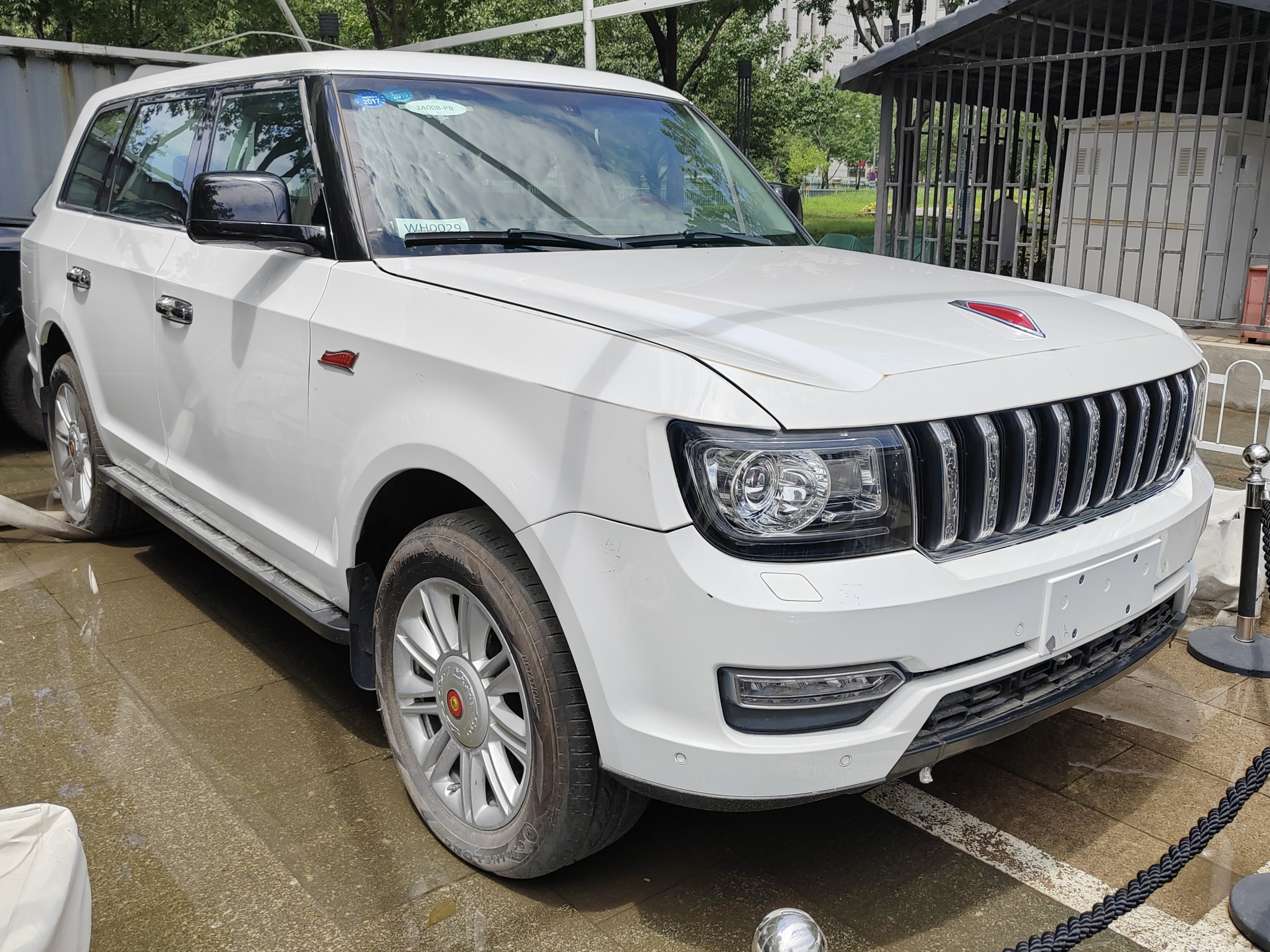

Overview
- Manufacturer: Hongqi
- Also called: Hongqi P504 (development codename)
- Production: 2015–2017
- Model years: 2016–2017
- Assembly: China: Changchun

Body and chassis
- Class: Full-size luxury SUV
- Body style: 5-door SUV
- Layout: Front-engine, four-wheel drive

Powertrain
- Engine: Petrol: 4.0 L twin-turbo V8
- Transmission: 8-speed automatic

Dimensions
- Wheelbase: 3,060 mm (120.5 in)
- Length: 5,198 mm (204.6 in)
- Width: 2,098 mm (82.6 in)
- Height: 1,890 mm (74.4 in)
- Kerb weight: 2,850 kg (6,283 lb)

Chronology
- Successor: Hongqi Guoyao

The Hongqi LS5 is a full-size luxury SUV that was manufactured by Chinese automobile manufacturer Hongqi, a subsidiary of FAW Group, from 2015 to 2017 for use by the Chinese government only.

== Overview ==
The Hongqi LS5, initially codenamed the P504 during development in 2014, was first revealed at Auto Shanghai on April 22, 2015 in Shanghai, China as a prototype and the first production-designed Hongqi SUV, An updated prototype featuring redesigned headlights and taillights, bumpers, and side mirrors among other minor updates, was shown at the 2016 Auto China in Beijing.

Hongqi had been preparing for the launch of an SUV since 2009 with the Hongqi SUV concept. It was not until 2012 that Hongqi had confirmed that it would release an SUV, planned to go into production in 2014. However, the first SUV, the LS5, began production the next year in September 2015 at the Hongqi factory in Changchun, Jilin. It was never produced for civilian use. Instead, it was produced as a low-volume limousine for Government of China, Chinese Communist Party, and People's Liberation Army officials, similar to the initially government-only BAIC BJ90. The first civilian-use Hongqi SUV is the HS5 compact crossover, launched in 2019. Hongqi also revealed a civilian-use 'LS' series SUV in 2021, the LS7.

Multiple examples of the Hongqi LS5 were produced, all in three different colors; black, white, and military green. A white example of the LS5 is displayed at the Beijing Auto Museum.

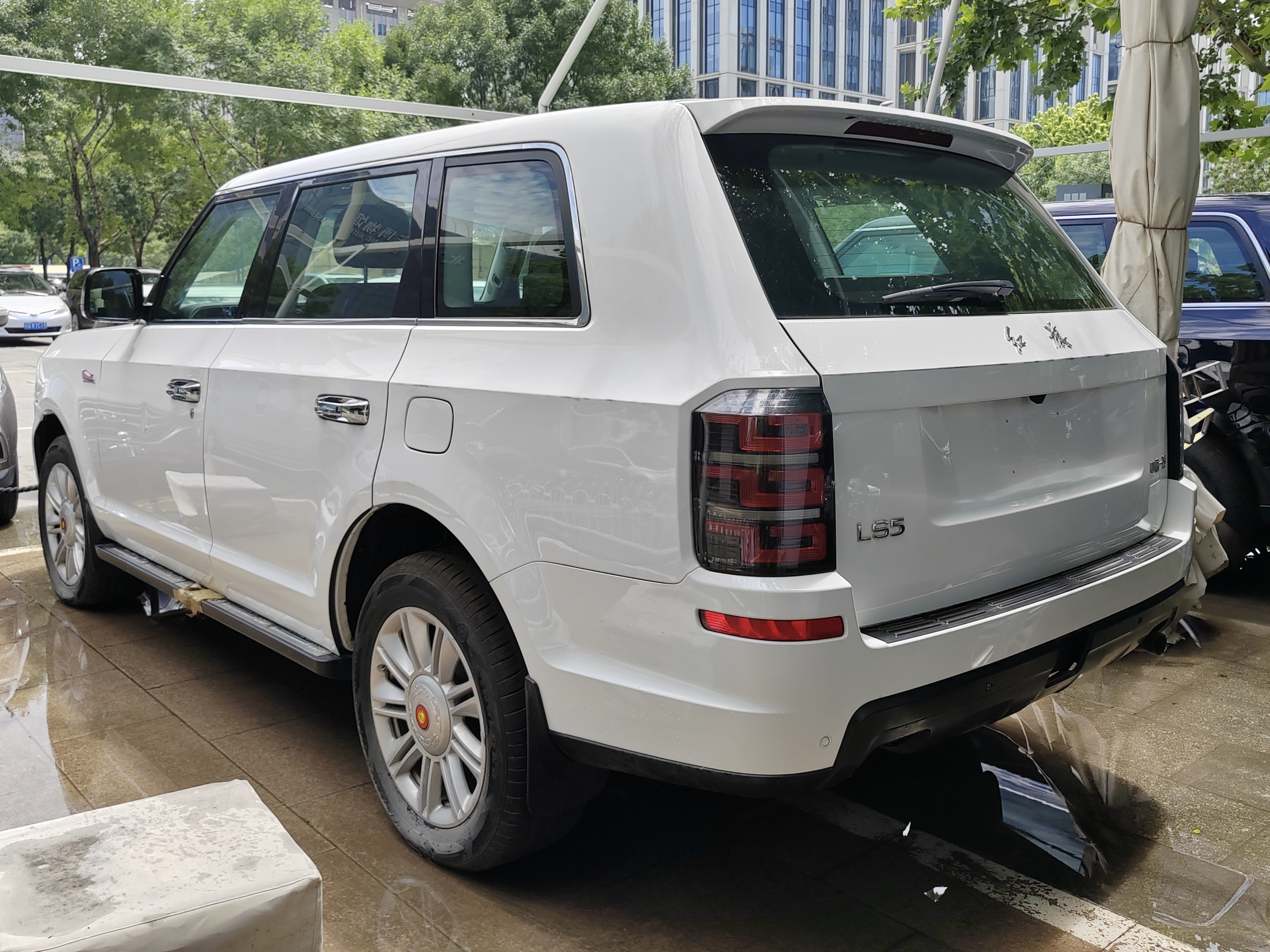
Rear view

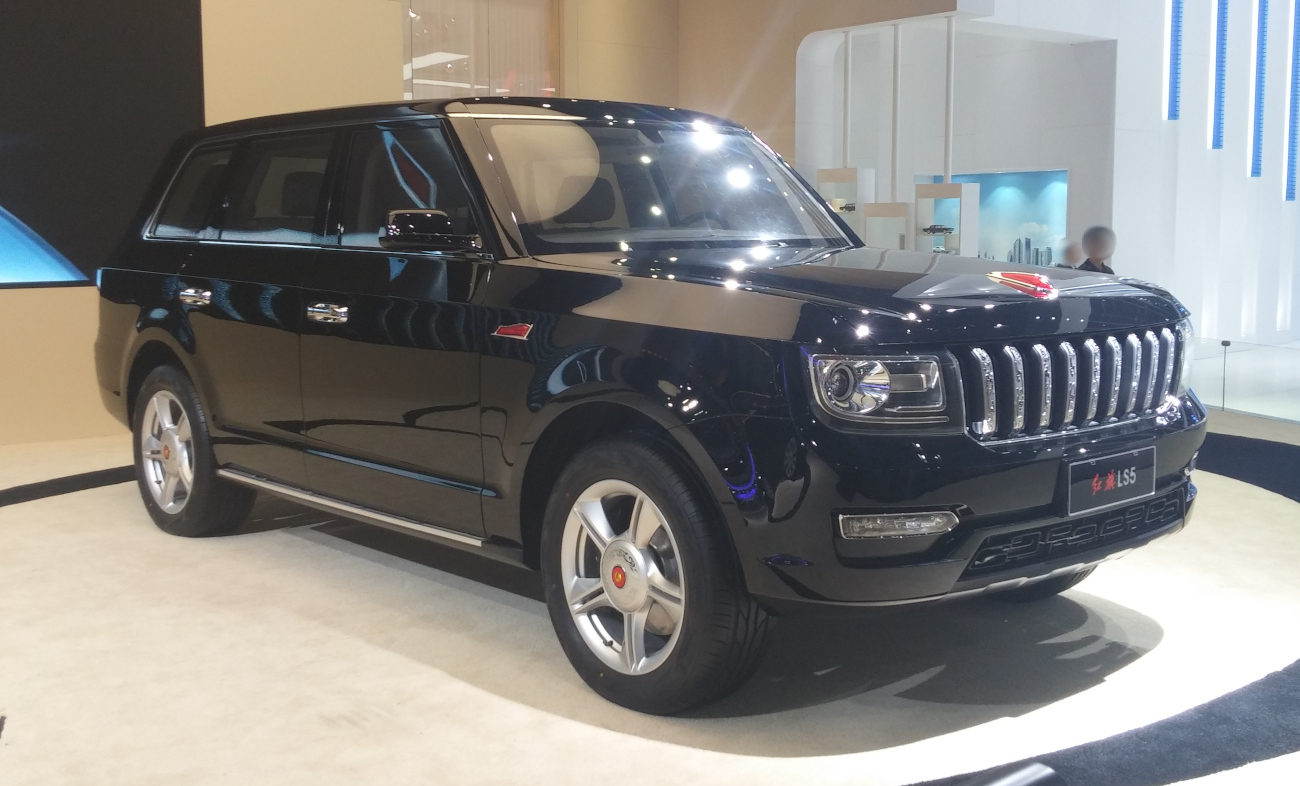
Hongqi LS5 concept at the 2015 Auto Shanghai

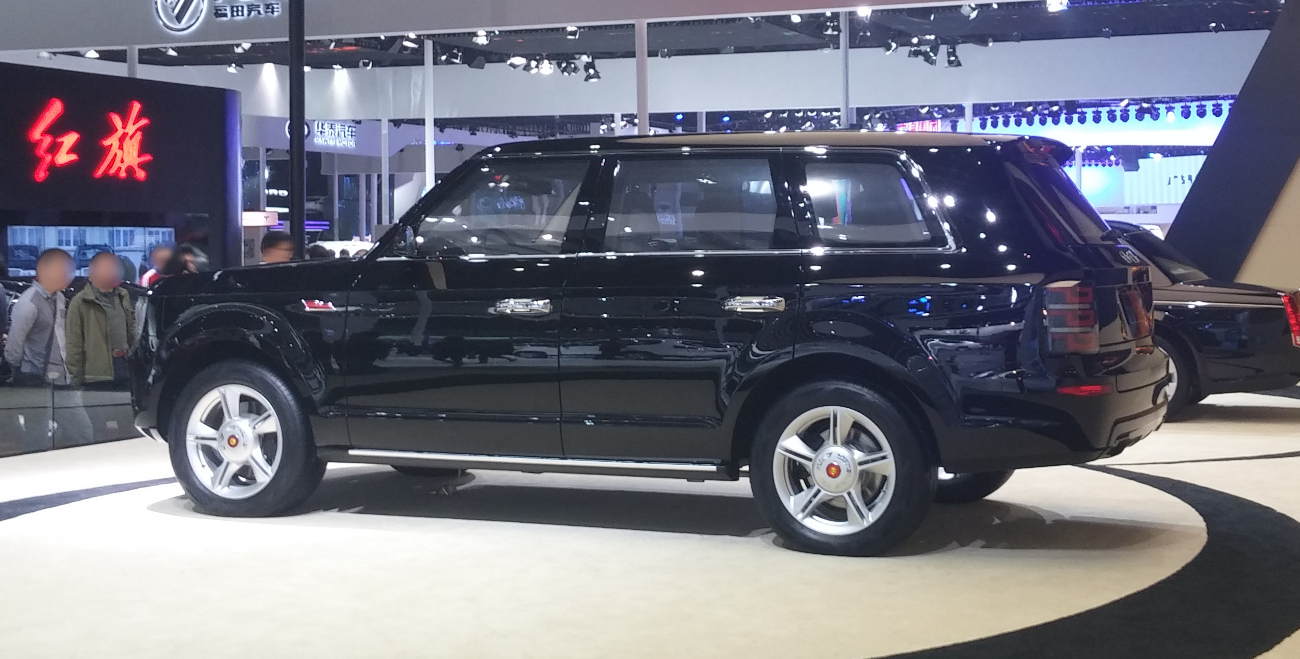
Rear view

== Specifications ==
=== Engine ===
The Hongqi LS5 is powered by a 4.0L twin turbo V8 engine, producing 381 hp and 530 Nm (Note: Later example shown with only 500 Nm of torque (1)) of torque. The engine gives the LS5 a 0-100 km/h (62 mph) time of 8.1 seconds and a top speed of 220 km/h (137 mph).

=== Interior ===
The interior of the production Hongqi LS5 features a different, more modern steering wheel than the one seen in the 2015 concept, as well as a large center touchscreen and a digital instrument cluster.
