= Hongqi LS7 =

Full-size luxury SUV

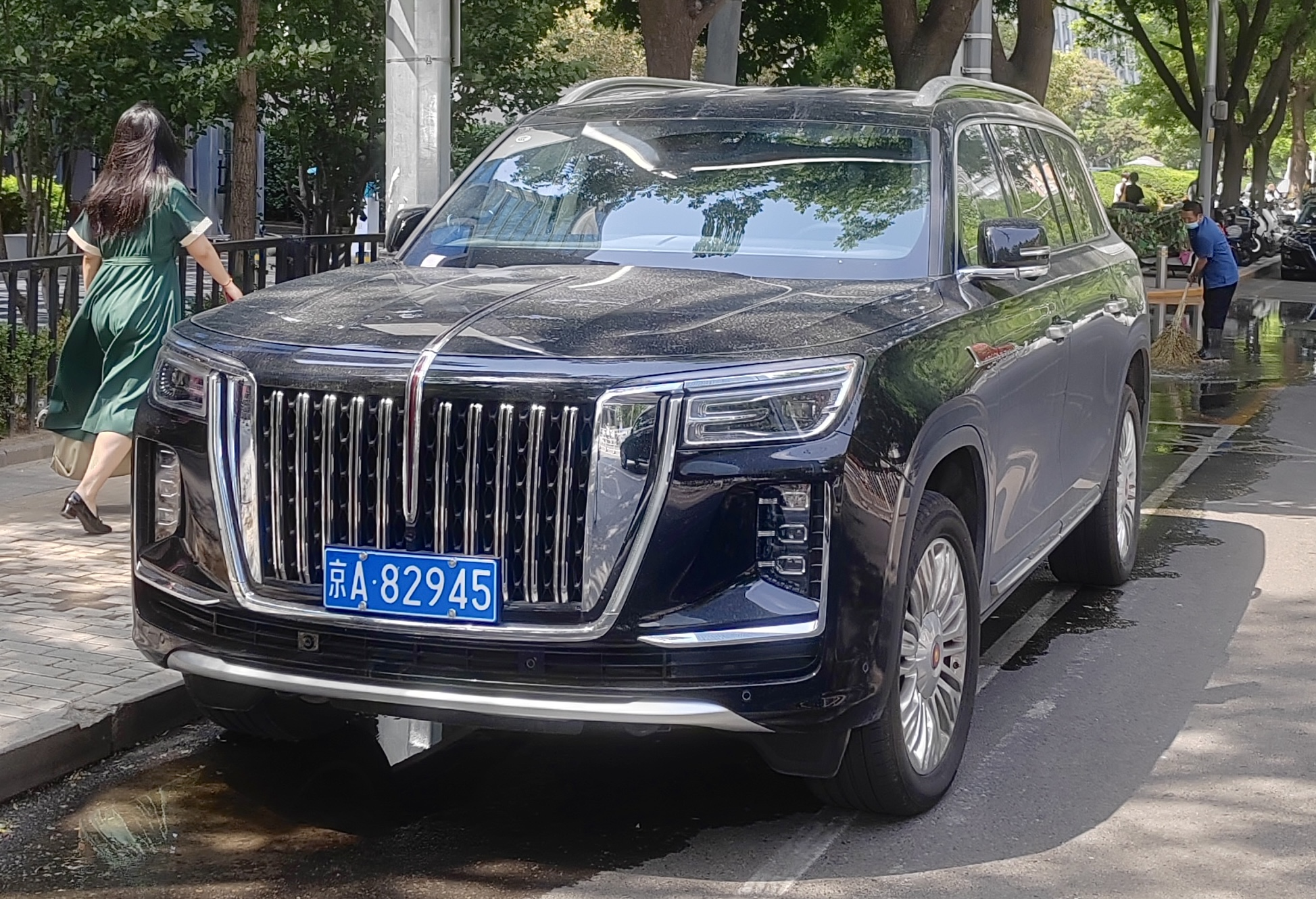

Overview
- Manufacturer: Hongqi (FAW Group)
- Also called: Hongqi Guoyao
- Production: 2022–present
- Assembly: China: Changchun, Jilin
- Designer: Giles Taylor

Body and chassis
- Class: Full-size luxury SUV (F)
- Body style: 5-door SUV
- Layout: Front-engine, four-wheel-drive

Powertrain
- Engine: 4.0 L CA8GV40T-02 turbo V8 (2022–2025); 4.0 L CA8GV40TD-03 twin-turbo V8 (2026–present)
- Transmission: 8-speed ZF8HP automatic transmission

Dimensions
- Wheelbase: 3,309 mm (130.3 in)
- Length: 5,695 mm (224.2 in)
- Width: 2,095 mm (82.5 in)
- Height: 1,985 mm (78.1 in)
- Curb weight: 3,100 kg (6,834 lb)

Chronology
- Predecessor: Hongqi LS5

The Hongqi LS7 is a full-size luxury SUV produced by Chinese automobile manufacturer Hongqi, a subsidiary of FAW Group.

== Overview ==
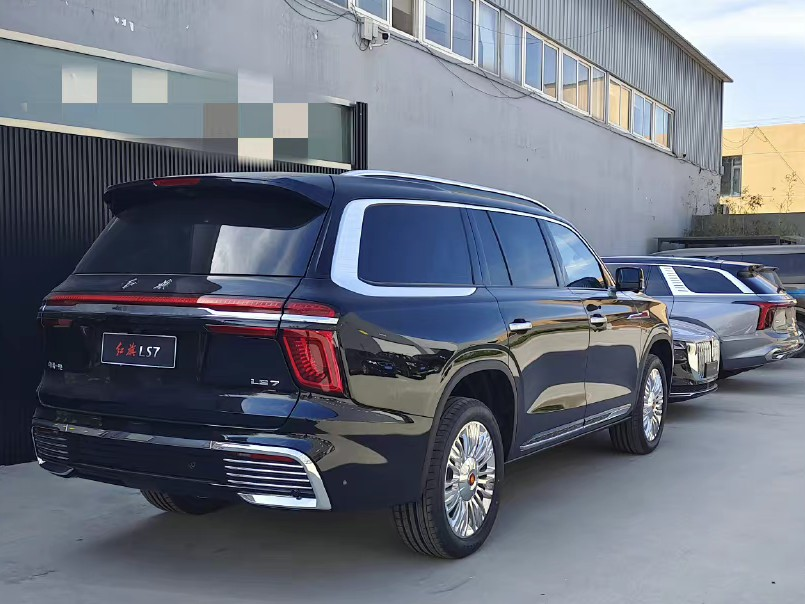
Rear view

The LS7 was officially revealed online on 25 October 2021, as the largest SUV by a Chinese manufacturer and a direct competitor to domestic full-size luxury SUVs such as the BAIC BJ90 and foreign import models including as the Cadillac Escalade, Lincoln Navigator, and Mercedes-Benz GLS.

In 2024, the LS7 was renamed as the Hongqi Guoyao (红旗国耀) in Chinese market.

== Specifications ==
The LS7 uses a 4.0 L turbocharged V8 engine that outputs 265 kW (355 hp; 360 PS) and 500 N⋅m (369 lb⋅ft; 51 kg⋅m) of torque. Matched with an 8-speed automatic transmission and a four-wheel drive system, the official 0-100km/h acceleration time is 9.1 seconds, and the top speed is 200km/h.

The 2026 model year received an all new 4.0 L twin-turbo V8 engine, with outputs increased to 400 kW (536 hp; 544 PS) and 725 N⋅m (535 lb⋅ft; 74 kg⋅m) of torque. The 0-100km/h acceleration time has improved to 6.1 seconds.

== Sales ==
Year	China
2023	197
2024	79
2025	83
