= Jinggangshan =

Jinggangshan or Jinggang Shan (Chinese: 井冈山; pinyin: Jǐnggāngshān) may refer to:

- Jinggangshan Mountains
- Jinggangshan City, named after the mountains
- Jinggang Shan (999), a Chinese military Type 071 amphibious transport dock
- BAW Jinggangshan, a car model produced by BAW
