= Jinggangshan (automobile) =

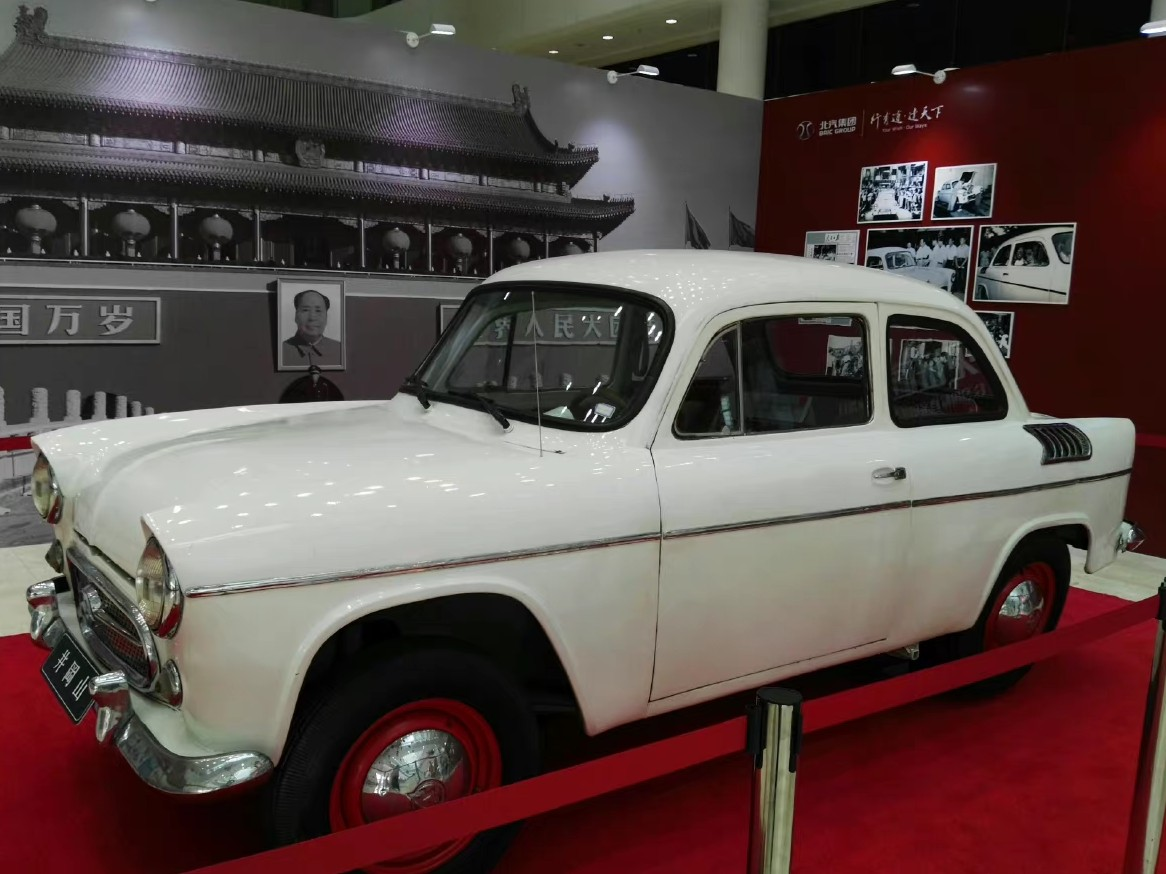

Overview
- Manufacturer: BAW
- Production: 1958–1960
- Assembly: China: Beijing

Body and chassis
- Body style: 4-door saloon

Powertrain
- Engine: 1.2 L I4 (petrol)
- Transmission: 4 speed manual

Dimensions
- Length: 4,100 mm (161.4 in)
- Width: 1,560 mm (61.4 in)
- Height: 1,450 mm (57.1 in)

The Jinggangshan (simplified Chinese: 井冈山; traditional Chinese: 井岡山; pinyin: Jǐnggāngshān) was the first passenger car produced by the Chinese automobile manufacturer Beijing Automobile Works (BAW) and sold under the Jinggangshan brand from 1958 to 1960.

== History ==
The Beijing-based company BAW was founded in 1953 with Soviet assistance. BAW initially manufactured accessories for Chinese vehicles, mainly carburetors, fuel pumps, headlights and smaller sheet metal parts.

China's automotive industry was affected by the industrialization initiatives of the country's Great Leap Forward. Beginning in 1958, several Chinese plants began to construct passenger cars for civil use. For the mid-range segment, three different designs were created in three plants. Shanghai Auto Works developed the Fenghuang, later known as Shanghai SH760, and First Automotive Works (FAW) developed the Dongfeng CA71.

BAW joined this process, with the first model being the small Jinggangshan, later supplemented by the luxury Beijing CB4 sedan. Initial plans provided for the Jinggangshan to be mass-produced—there was talk of 10,000 copies per year— to meet the demand for cars in the country. Due to economic difficulties, the goal could not even begin to be achieved. Jinggangshan did not stay long in the program. After only two years, it was replaced by the Dongfanghong BJ760, a significantly larger front-engined sedan that was based on the GAZ-21 Volga and was produced for ten years.

== Model description ==
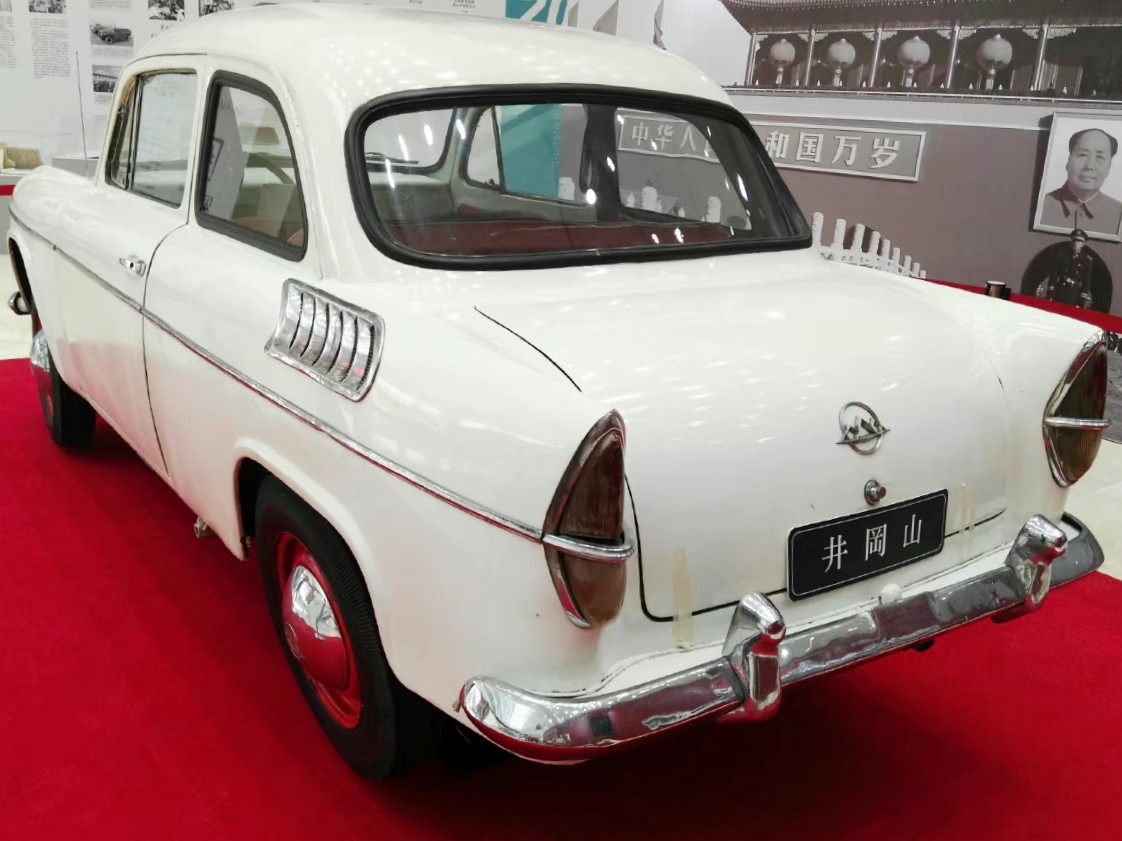
Jinggangshan sedan by BAW (rear)

The Jinggangshan was not an independent Chinese construction. It was common practice in China at the time to take apart Soviet, European or American cars, to examine them and to recreate the respective components according to the template in their own factories. This is probably how the BAW technicians proceeded with Jinggangshan. According to one source, the Jinggangshan had a four-cylinder boxer engine with a displacement of 1.2 liters and an output of 26 kW (35 PS; 35 bhp) located in the rear.

The few available sources agree that the Jinggangshan was technically based on the Volkswagen Beetle. The body of the Jinggangshan, however, bore no resemblance to the Beetle; it was completely independent. It was in the pontoon style and had a notchback. Formally there were similarities to the NSU Prinz. A special feature were three large, round ventilation openings in the rear fenders. Ironically, Volkswagen's own Beetle based notchback built three years later - the Type 3 - would strongly resemble the prototype two door Jinggangshan in many ways, though this resemblance is true only for the two door prototype and not the four-door production models.
