= Black Volga =

Polish urban legend

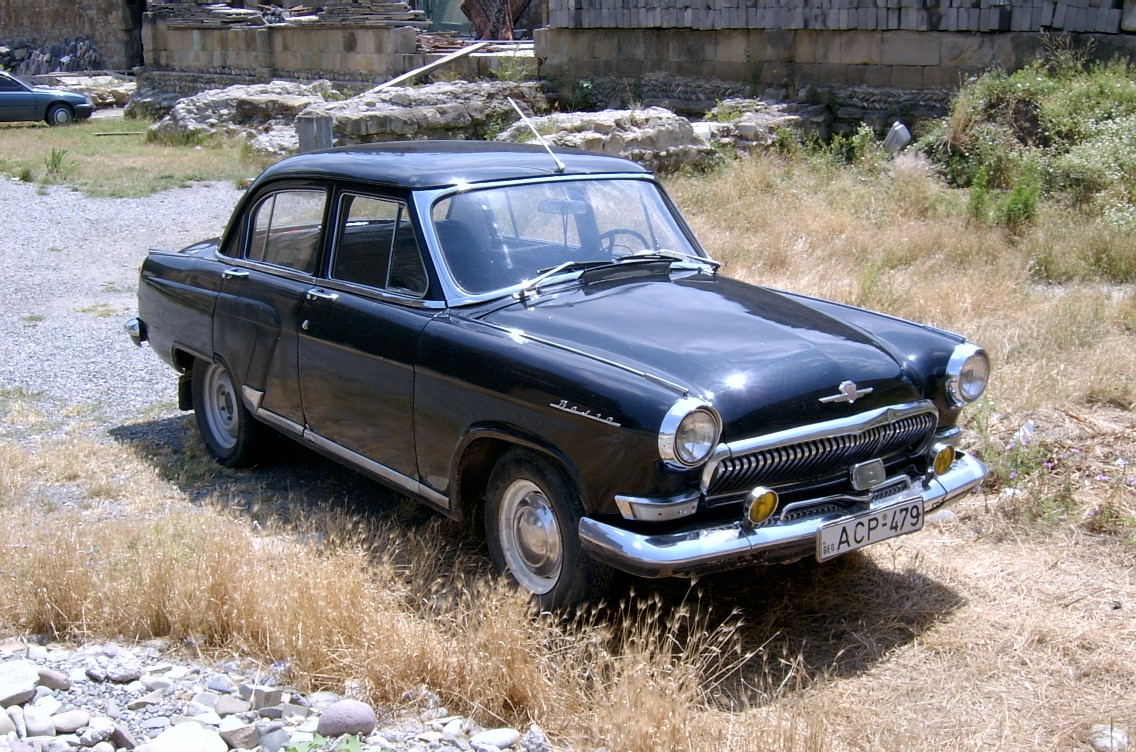
A black GAZ-21 Volga

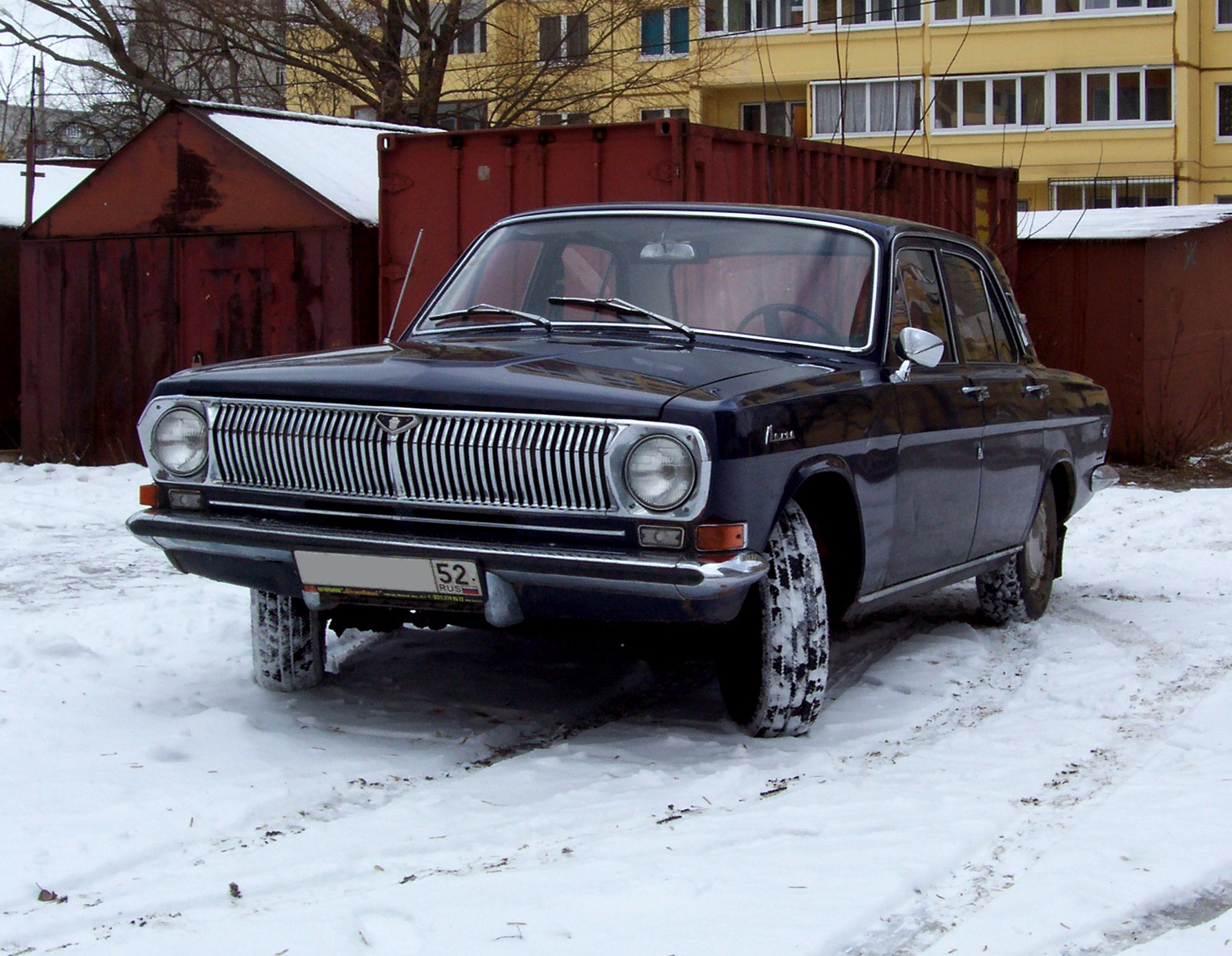
A black GAZ-24 Volga

Black Volga (Polish: czarna wołga) refers to an urban legend widespread in Italy, Poland, Romania, Hungary, Russia, Belarus, Ukraine, Greece and Mongolia, mainly in the 1960s and 1970s. The legend refers to a black (or in some versions red) GAZ-21 or GAZ-24 vehicle that was allegedly used to abduct and murder people. According to different versions, it was driven by communist secret police, Russian mafia, Satanists or Satan himself. The car is described as having white wheel rims, white curtains or other white elements.

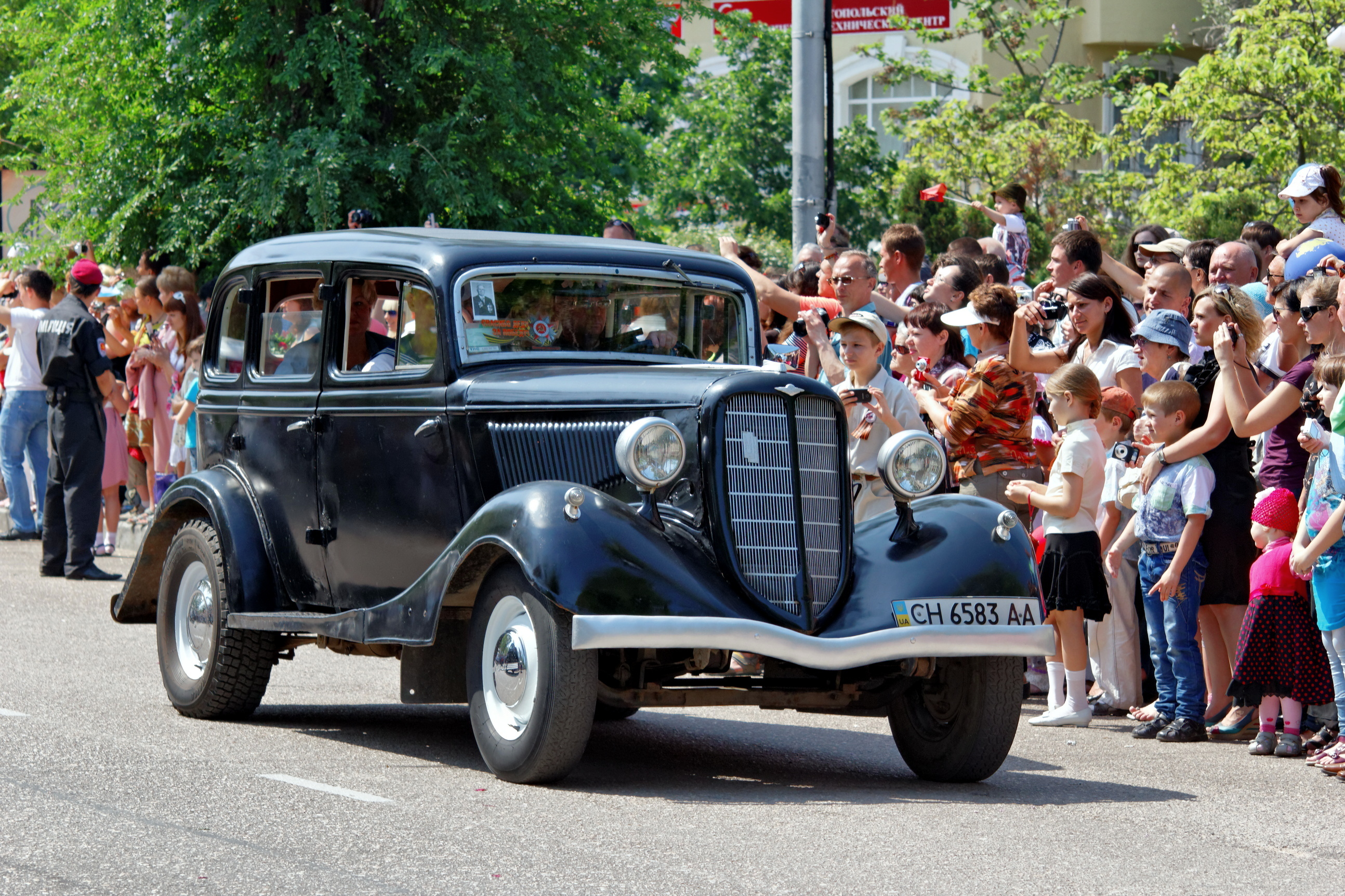
A black GAZ-M1

This impression was also caused by the active use of the passenger car of the Gorky Automobile Plant GAZ-M1 (Emka) by the NKVD bodies during the years of mass repression. For the sake of saving money, during almost all the time of its release, the M1 was only available with black paint, which emphasized the ominous image of the car.

Supposedly, victims were kidnapped and then murdered by the perpetrators to use their blood as a cure for rich Westerners or Arabs suffering from leukemia. Other variants used organ theft as the motive, combining it with another infamous legend of kidney theft by the KGB. The legend surfaced again in the late 20th century, with a BMW or Mercedes car taking the Volga's place. The Black Volga was sometimes depicted with horns instead of wing mirrors. It could also have the number "666" on the license plate, as well as having white windows or curtains. In this version, the driver (allegedly the devil) would ask passers-by for the time and kill them when they approached the car to answer. In another version of the legend, the victim would die at the same time a day later (the driver would say: "Tomorrow you will die at this hour"). However, there was an effective defence method—when the potential victim answered "It is God's time", the car would quickly vanish.

In Czechoslovakia, the story appeared in the late 1970s as the black ambulance, while in Romania, the Volgas were replaced in the 1970s with Dacia 1301s, a modified version of the Dacia 1300 with several features not available to the public, which were eventually replaced by ambulances as well in the 1990s.

== See also ==
- Black helicopter
- Phantom social workers
- Men in Black
