= Phantom social workers =

Claim that people are posing as social workers to abduct children

The term "phantom social workers" (also known as "bogus social workers") arose in the United Kingdom and United States following sporadic reports to police and media about people claiming to be social workers and attempting to abduct children from their parents. Police investigations into these reports failed to find any substantial evidence or locate any suspects.

The phenomenon was initially and most frequently reported in the early 1990s.

== Media coverage ==
In the early 1990s, reports emerged in the UK media concerning the purported conduct of persons claiming to be social workers. Most witnesses reported being visited by one or two women in their late twenties to early thirties who were dressed professionally. In some versions of the story, the visits included a woman accompanied by a man who seemed to be acting in a supervisory role. Visits consisted of an inspection of the children in the household, during which the "social workers" displayed strange behaviour. Claims about the nature of the "examinations" fed concerns that children were being sexually abused.

== Police investigation ==
Police in South Yorkshire launched a major investigation into the phantom social worker phenomenon in 1990, known as "Operation Childcare." The investigation became one of the largest in UK history, with 23 separate police forces participating. After a year of investigating, police had gathered 250 reports – of these, police believed only two cases were genuine and 18 deserved to be taken seriously. Criminologists speculated that even genuine cases may have involved self-appointed child abuse investigators, or individuals seeking to make false accusations, rather than child sexual abusers. No arrests were made and Operation Childcare has since been disbanded.

Lothian and Borders Police set up a special unit to investigate the subject, but disbanded it in 1994 with no arrests.

== Speculated origins ==
It is thought that reports of unidentified "social workers" attempting to take children away from their parents were merely scare stories or urban legends fuelled by the story of Marietta Higgs, a paediatrician from Cleveland, England, who diagnosed 121 children as being victims of sexual abuse from their parents without any evidence or reason.

Police believe some of the visits were made by vigilante citizens conducting their own child abuse investigations. Other reported visits can be explained by the misidentification of door-to-door salesmen, canvassers, and religious missionaries.

== See also ==
- Satanic ritual abuse
- Khapper
- Men in black
- Black Volga
- Child abduction scare of 2002
