= Dongfanghong BJ760 =

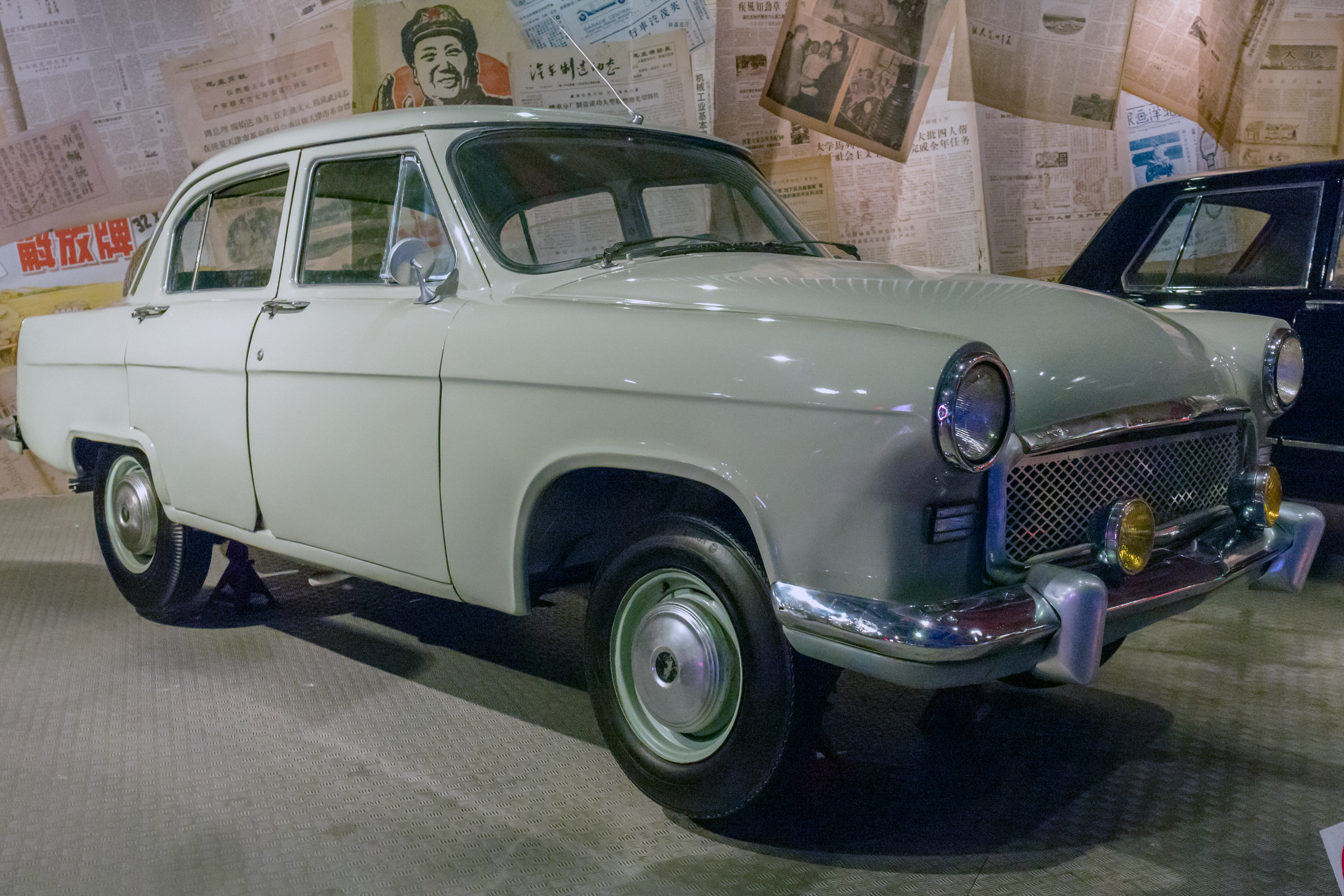

Overview
- Manufacturer: BAW
- Production: 1960–1969
- Assembly: China: Beijing

Body and chassis
- Class: Executive car (E)
- Body style: 4-door sedan

Powertrain
- Engine: 2.5 L ZMZ M-21 I4
- Transmission: 3-speed manual

Dimensions
- Wheelbase: 2,700 mm (110 in)
- Length: 4,810 mm (189 in)
- Width: 1,800 mm (71 in)
- Height: 1,610 mm (63 in)

Chronology
- Predecessor: Jinggangshan

The Dongfanghong BJ760 (Chinese: 东方红) is an executive sedan produced by BAW. Development started as a licensed copy of the GAZ-21 Volga with assistance from the Soviets sharing chassis units, drawings and blueprints for reference, and was produced from 1960 to 1969 with a total of 238 units produced. It replaced the Jinggangshan sedan by BAW. During development, the car was named Xinghuo 76 (Spark 76), but was later changed to Dongfanghong for the production version. The name Dongfanghong means "The East is Red" and refers to a patriotic song of the Chinese Communist Party. The name has been used by multiple companies for branding and product names.

Five years after the discontinuation of the BJ760, BAW presented the Beijing BJ750 in 1974, a contemporary successor, of which only a few were produced.

== History ==
In 1958, the Great Leap Forward campaign began in China, the goal of which was to catch up with China's lagging behind Western countries. The consequences of this initiative also affected the automotive sector and since 1958, several Chinese factories began to produce passenger cars with the most well-known being the Dongfanghong BJ760 (based on the GAZ-21), Dongfeng CA71 (based on the Simca Vedette), Hongqi CA72 (based on the ZiL-111) and the mass-produced Shanghai SH760. A lot of the models were built based on Soviet vehicles and the design of the Dongfanghong BJ760 is similar to the Soviet GAZ-21 in general yet distinctive with minor redesigns around the body.

In November 1959, the State Council of China tasked the factory with imitating the Soviet GAZ-21, and provided a real car as an example, in the early 1960s, a group of five Soviet experts arrived at the factory with a set of car drawings, and then in April of the same year, the plant assembled the first three samples of the redesigned prototype, which passed 25,000 km of road tests by May 1965. At the end of 1966, the plant received an annual plan for the production of 600 cars, but at that time the deterioration of Sino-Soviet relations began, and by the time of the 106th unit, an order was received from the chairman of the Beijing Revolutionary Committee, Xie Fuzhi, to stop production in order "to prevent the bourgeois way of life." Technical support from the USSR was curtailed, but small scale production continued until the end of 1969. In total, 238 units were produced, although some sources state 600 units of the BJ760 were built.

== Powertrain ==
The engine of the Dongfanghong BJ760 was shared with the Soviet GAZ-21 Volga which is a 2.4-litre (2,445 cc) four-cylinder petrol engine producing about 70 hp (51 kW) and 167 N⋅m (123 lb⋅ft), developed and manufactured by the Soviet Zavolzhye Motorni Zavod (ZMZ, Zavolzhye Engine Factory) and was mated to a four-speed manual transmission. The top speed of the Dongfanghong BJ769 is 125 km/h (78 mph). Later on in the 1960's, BAW started to manufacture this engine in factories located in Beijing and in Tianjin, where it was designated 492. The engine was later shared in many other BAW products, including the Beijing BJ212 off-roader.
