= Panasonic Lumix DMC-LS5 =

Overview
- Maker: Panasonic Lumix
- Type: Compact
- F-numbers: 2.8 - 6.5

Sensor/medium
- Sensor type: CCD
- Sensor size: 14.1 megapixels
- Storage media: SD, SDHC, SDXC

Focusing
- Focus modes: Normal
- Focus areas: Normal: Wide 15 cm - infinity / Tele 60 cm - infinity

Flash
- Flash: built-in

Shutter
- Frame rate: 0.8
- Shutter speeds: 8 - 1/2,000

General
- LCD screen: 2.7" TFT Screen LCD
- Battery: Alkaline AA Battery x 2
- Dimensions: 96.5×62.0×27.2 mm (3.80×2.44×1.07 in)
- Weight: 0.38 lb with AA Battery and SD Memory Card

Panasonic Lumix DMC-LS5 is a digital camera by Panasonic Lumix. The highest-resolution pictures it records is 14.1 megapixels, through its 26mm Ultra Wide-Angle.

== Property ==
- HD Movie Recording: 1,280 x 720 pixels, 30 fps
- Continuous shooting mode: full-resolution image, 0.8 frames/sec
