= Zavolzhye Engine Factory =

Russian automotive company

Zavolzhye Motor Plant
- Native name: Заволжский моторный завод
- Type: Open joint-stock company
- Traded as: MCX: ZMZN
- Industry: Automotive
- Founded: 1958
- Headquarters: Zavolzhye, Nizhny Novgorod Oblast, Russia
- Owner: UAZ (94.9%)
- Parent: Sollers PJSC
- Website: zmz.ru

The Zavolzhye Engine Factory (Russian: Заволжский моторный завод, ЗМЗ, romanized: Zavolzhskiy Motornyy Zavod, ZMZ) is a Russian automotive engine producer.

The plant was founded in April 1958 to provide GAZ with engines, in particular for its new GAZ-21 Volga.

The factory's first product was a brand-new 2,445 cc (149.2 cu in) OHV engine. Unusual for the era, it had aluminum block and head, with chain-driven camshaft and compression ratio of 6.6:1; it produced 70 hp (51 kW) at 4,000 rpm and 167 N⋅m (123 lb⋅ft) at 2,200 rpm. The first engine was assembled 4 November 1959; by December 1968, ZMZ had produced one million units.

ZMZ became independent in 1961, and was bought by UAZ in 2001. It produces spare parts for many vehicles of Soviet origin, as well as for some Ford models.

== Engines Produced ==
- ZMZ-409051.10, ZMZ-409052.10 (gasoline/CNG) — used in UAZ Cargo, UAZ Profi
- ZMZ-40906.10 — used in UAZ Patriot
- ZMZ-40905.10 — used in UAZ Hunter
- ZMZ-409.10 (Euro-0) — used in UAZ vehicles
- ZMZ-40911.10 — used in UAZ "Bukhanka"
- ZMZ-409061.10 — used in BAW-RUS
- ZMZ-51432.10 (diesel), ZMZ-5143.10 (turbo diesel) — used in UAZ vehicles
- ZMZ-52342.10, ZMZ-5245.10 (fuel-injected V8, gasoline/CNG) — used in PAZ-3205
- ZMZ-5231.10, ZMZ-5233.10 — used in GAZ-3308
- ZMZ-40522.10 (Euro-2), ZMZ-40524.10 (Euro-3) — used in GAZelle
- ZMZ-40525.10 (Euro-3) — used in GAZ-31105
- ZMZ-4062.10 — used in Volga
- ZMZ-4063.10 (Euro-0) — used in GAZelle
- ZMZ Pro (a variation of ZMZ-409)

== Sources ==
- Thompson, Andy. Cars of the Soviet Union. Somerset, UK: Haynes Publishing, 2008.
