= BAIC BJ90 =

Chinese full-size luxury SUV

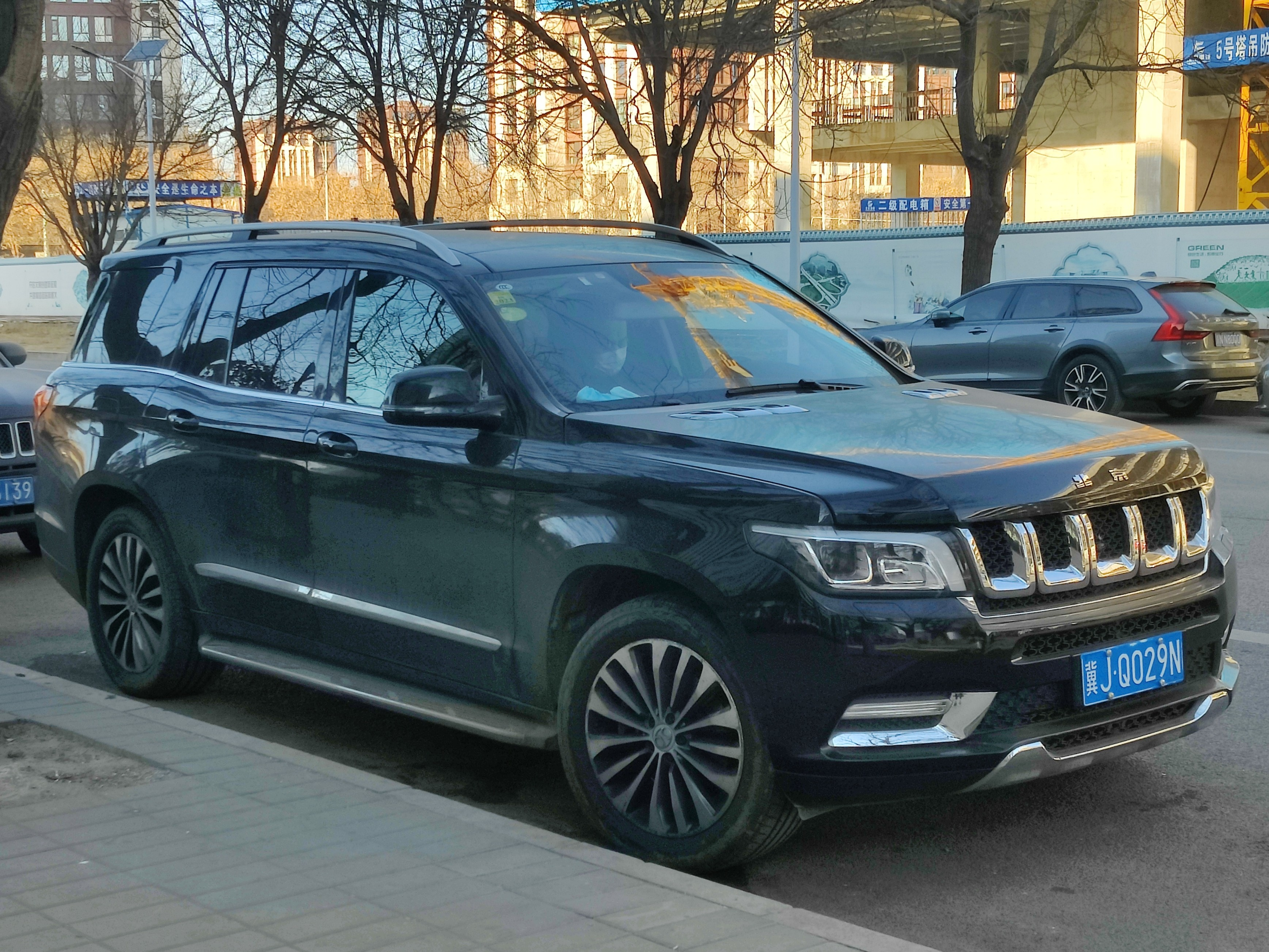
- BAIC BJ90

Overview
- Manufacturer: BAIC Motor
- Also called: Beijing BJ90
- Production: 2016–2023
- Model years: 2017–2023

Body and chassis
- Class: Full-size luxury SUV
- Body style: 5-door SUV
- Layout: Front-engine, four-wheel drive
- Related: Mercedes-Benz GL-Class (X166)

Powertrain
- Engine: Petrol: 3.0 L M276 DE 30 LA twin-turbo V6; 4.0 L M176 twin-turbo V8
- Transmission: 7-speed 7G-Tronic automatic; 9-speed 9G-Tronic automatic (2020–2023)

Dimensions
- Wheelbase: 3,100 mm (122.0 in)
- Length: 5,171 mm (203.6 in)
- Width: 1,995 mm (78.5 in)
- Height: 1,860 mm (73.2 in)
- Kerb weight: 2,515–2,590 kg (5,545–5,710 lb)

The BAIC BJ90 or Beijing BJ90 is a full-size luxury SUV produced from 2016. It is based on the second generation Mercedes-Benz GL-Class which has been renamed to GLS-Class as of the 2016 facelift.

Due to the Beijing-Benz joint venture BAIC Group and Daimler AG has, and Daimler owns a 12% stake in BAIC Motor, the parent company of the Beijing Automobiles brand, BAIC was able to acquire the specs of the Mercedes-Benz SUV as the foundation for the BJ90.

The SUV retails at around 988,000 yuan (US$141,870).

== Overview ==
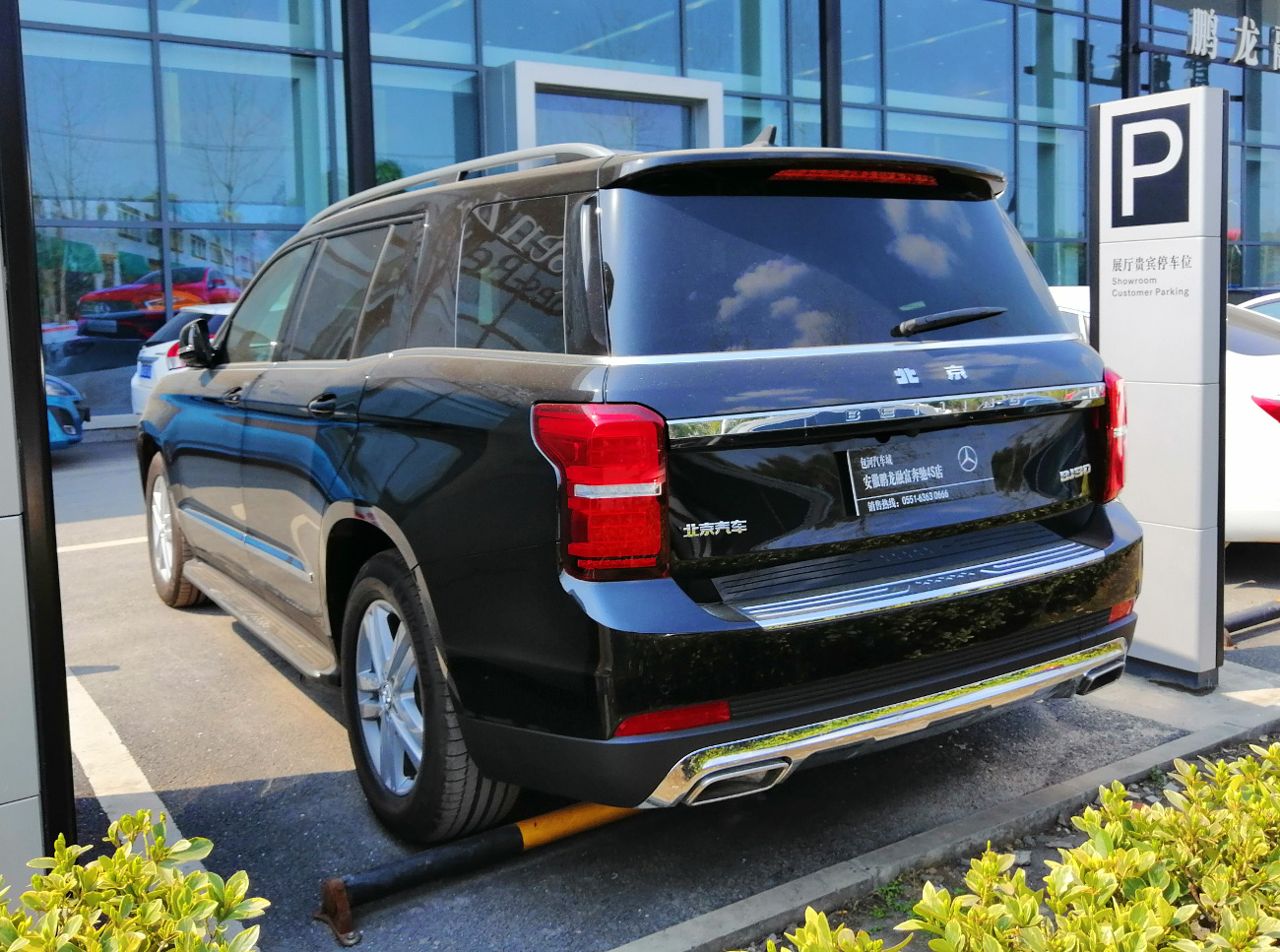
BAIC BJ90 rear

Originally seen in 2015, the BJ90 debuted at an event in Beijing in August 2017 and later went on sale in 2018.

Offered in five trim levels, the BJ90 is currently priced from 710,800 yuan to 998,000 yuan (US$101,600 to US$142,780 - July 2020 exchange rate).

The drivetrain of the BJ90 is sourced from Mercedes-Benz with two engines including a 3.0-litre M276 DE 30 LA twin-turbo V6 engine producing 333 hp (248 kW; 338 PS) and 480 N⋅m (350 lb⋅ft) from the GL 400, and a 4.0-litre M176 twin-turbo V8 engine with 421 hp (314 kW; 427 PS) and 600 N⋅m (440 lb⋅ft). Compared to the GL-Class, the BJ90 is 1,902 mm (74.9 in) taller, 1,995 mm (78.5 in) wider and 5,171 mm (203.6 in) longer.

Transmission is the Mercedes-sourced seven-speed automatic gearbox sending power to all four wheels via the Mercedes-Benz 4Matic four-wheel-drive system. Its accessories are also sources from Mercedes.

=== Facelift ===
The BJ90 was made available from 2020 onwards with a 9G-Tronic option. This version is known as the BJ90 Shanhe Edition, a cheaper version of the BJ90 that is sold with black color only.

== Sales ==
In 2019, 258 BJ90s were sold. 267 BJ90s were sold in 2020 and 1,563 BJ90s were sold in 2021.

Year	China
2023	3,695
2024	906
2025	5
