= GAZ-21 =

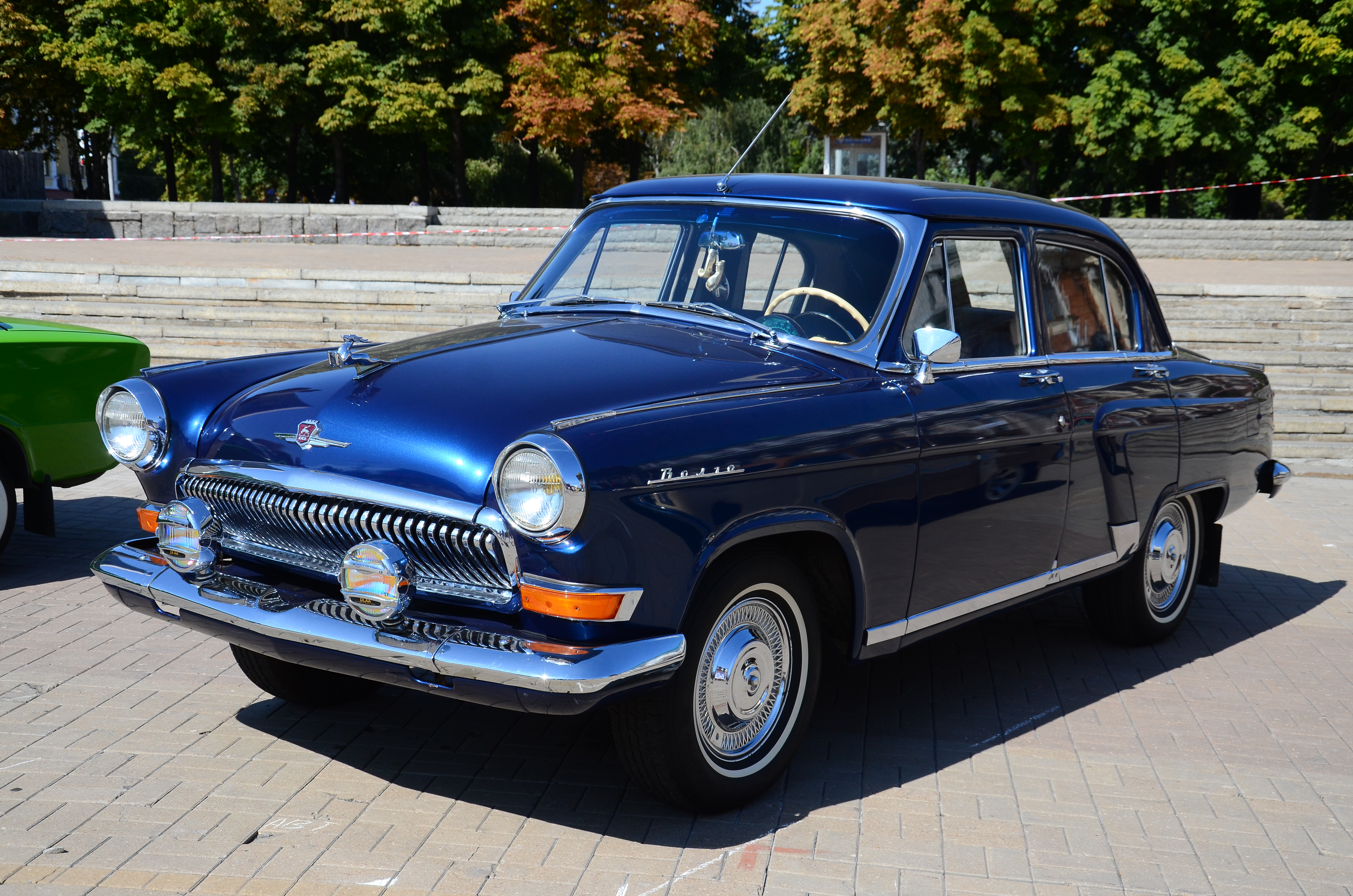

Overview
- Manufacturer: GAZ
- Also called: Scaldia-Volga M21 (export markets); Dongfanghong BJ760 (China)
- Production: 1956–1970
- Assembly: Soviet Union: Gorky; Belgium: Antwerp (Sobimpex N.V.)

Body and chassis
- Class: Executive car (E)
- Body style: 4-door saloon (GAZ-21, GAZ-23); 5-door wagon (GAZ-22)

Powertrain
- Engine: 2.5 L M-21 I4 (GAZ-21/22); 5.5 L M-13 V8 (GAZ-23)
- Transmission: 3-speed automatic (initially); 3-speed manual

Dimensions
- Wheelbase: 2,700 mm (110 in)
- Length: 4,810 mm (189 in)
- Width: 1,800 mm (71 in)
- Height: 1,610 mm (63 in)
- Curb weight: 1,460–1,523 kg (3,219–3,358 lb)

Chronology
- Predecessor: GAZ-M20 Pobeda
- Successor: GAZ-24 Volga

The GAZ M21 Volga is an automobile produced in the Soviet Union by GAZ (Gorkovsky Avtomobilniy Zavod, in English "Gorky Automobile Factory") from 1956 to 1970. The first car to carry the Volga name, it was developed in the early 1950s. Volgas were built with high ground clearance (which gives it a specific "high" look, contrary to "low-long-sleek" look of Western cars of similar design), rugged suspension, strong and forgiving engine, and rustproofing on a scale unheard of in the 1950s.

The Volga was stylistically in line with the major American manufacturers of the period in which it was introduced, and incorporated such then-luxury features as the reclining front seat, cigarette lighter, heater, windshield washer and three-wave radio.

The GAZ M-21 Volga became the biggest and most luxurious car officially sold to individual owners in the USSR in large quantities; though its very high price made it unavailable for most car buyers, 639,478 cars were produced in total.

== The three series of GAZ-21 ==
Three series GAZ-21 were released, most easily distinguished by the grille. The first series (1956–58), known as the Star, featured a lattice of three large horizontal bars in the centre of which was a medallion with a star. Vehicles of the second series (1958–1962), known as the Shark, featured a grille with 16 vertical slits. Finally, the third series (1962–1970), known as the Baleen, featured a grille with 34 thin vertical rods.

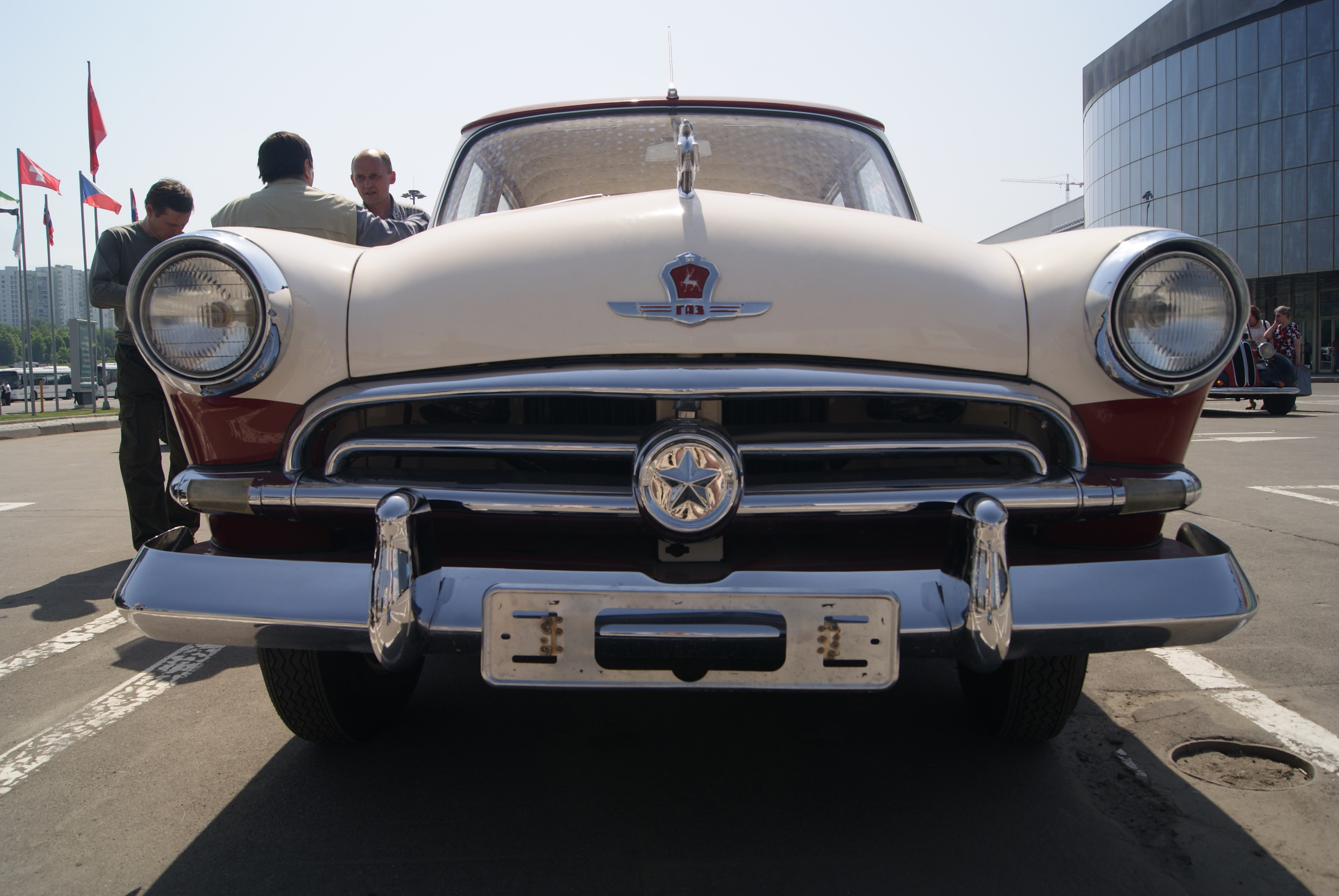
First series (1956–58)

=== First series (1956–1958) ===
The design process leading to the GAZ-21 began in November 1953. Alexander Nevzorov, head of the design team, was given a free hand to develop whatever he wanted to reach the objective of competing with American automobiles. Designer Lev Eremeyev decided to follow the fashion set by the Chevrolet Bel Air, Plymouth Savoy, and Ford Mainline; the finished product bears a resemblance to the 1952 Mainline, although according to archive documents, the GAZ-21 was just stylistically inspired by the American Ford and was not mechanically reverse engineered and developed from it. In addition, the two cars are almost completely different mechanically and their dimensions are also slightly different. The prototype appeared in the first quarter of 1954, powered by an inline four with overhead camshaft (driven by chain) and cross-flow hemispherical head. Since the OHV engine was not ready in time, production M21s had a 65 PS (48 kW; 64 hp) 2,432 cc (148 cu in) sidevalve four, based on the GAZ-20's. The Volga was offered with a three-speed transmission, either manual (with synchronized second and third gears) or automatic. Front suspension was independent, while the rear was a live axle with semielliptical springs; lever shock absorbers were on all four corners. Lubrication was by a central oiling system, from a drum and foot-operated pump; the oil lines were prone to puncturing, and not all of the 19 lubricated points were supplied equally. The Volga offered front seats able to fold flat (not unlike a contemporary Nash option) and came standard with cigarette lighter and a radio (still optional on most U.S. cars). The three variants were the standard M21G, an M21B taxi (with a taximeter in place of the radio and bucket seats in front instead of a bench), and a tropical model, the M21GYU, all with the GAZ leaping deer hood ornament. Drag coefficient was a surprisingly good 0.42. The only thing that the Volga and Mainline had in common was the Ford-O-Matic automatic transmission, which the GAZ plant licensed for use in their vehicles. However, only a few early Volgas had this transmission, and only for a limited time, before a manual transmission was made the only option.

The Volga made its public debut in 1955, with a three cars on a demonstration drive from Moscow to the Crimea, two automatic models and a manual. It was, however, still far from production-ready; in the first year, 1956, only five cars were assembled, the first on 10 October 1956. Full-scale production began in 1957, with a list price of 5,400 rubles. The new 1957 production cars, known as Series Ones, had a brand-new 2,445 cc (149.2 cu in) OHV engine, the first model produced by Zavolzhskiy Motornyy Zavod (Zavolzhye Engine Factory, ZMZ). Unusual for the era, it had aluminum block and head, with gear-driven camshaft and compression ratio of 6.6:1; it produced 70 PS (51 kW; 69 hp) at 4,000 rpm and 123 lb⋅ft (167 N⋅m) at 2,200 rpm.

The automatic transmission model was soon discontinued, with only 700 built: it was widely criticized as being too difficult for Soviet drivers to maintain, few service stations were available to do the work and few private mechanics were qualified, and a shortage of transmission oil existed. From 1958, a three-speed manual, with synchromesh on the top two gears, was the only transmission available; this was the M21V, while the taxi became the M21A. The automatic did go on to be used in the low-production GAZ-13 Chaika, which was also maintained by professionals. Standard equipment on all models included spare parts and two tool kits, with spanners, wrenches, screwdrivers, a tire pump, and a can of paint to fix minor dings.

Also, export models were built, M21D with the manual transmission and M21E with the automatic, both with a higher 7.2:1 compression engine, producing 80 PS (59 kW; 79 hp).

Cars produced in the fall of 1958 combined features of the first and second series.

=== Second series (1959–1962) ===
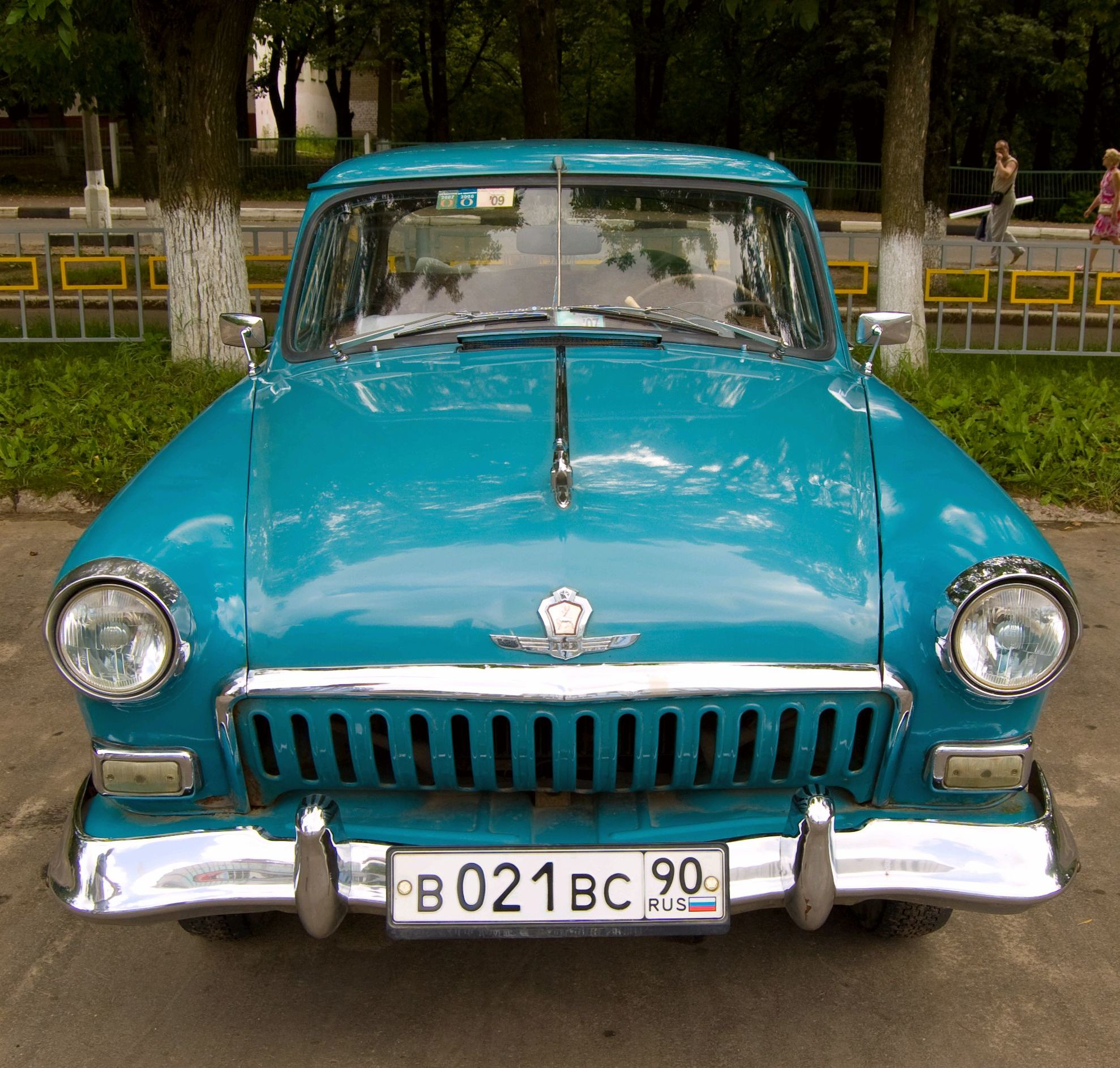
Second series (1959–62)

Second-series Volgas were introduced in 1959, with a new grille painted the body color or in chrome. Halfway through the 1959 production run (model year 1959 1/2), a vinyl cover was added to the dash. Added were windscreen washers and tubeless tires. Just before the second-series production concluded, telescopic shocks replaced the lever type. The 1961 Volgas were priced at 5,100 rubles.

Variants of this series included the M21I and M21A taxi with the 70 PS (51 kW; 69 hp) inline-four, and the M21K and right-hand drive M21H (for export) with the 80 PS (59 kW; 79 hp) engine.

The Volga was shown at the 1958 Brussels World's Fair and together with the GAZ-52 truck and the GAZ-13 Chaika it won the Grand Prize. In the same year, production for export began. The second-series Volgas became known for having no frills, but outstanding durability, helped by the 230 mm (9.1 in) ground clearance. In 1959, a Volga took a class win at the Thousand Lakes Rally in Finland, and third at the Acropolis Rally. That year, the central lubrication system was deleted, in favor of a more traditional local grease-application nipple.

In early 1962, a small number of cars were built that combined features of the second and third series.

=== Third series (1962–1970) ===
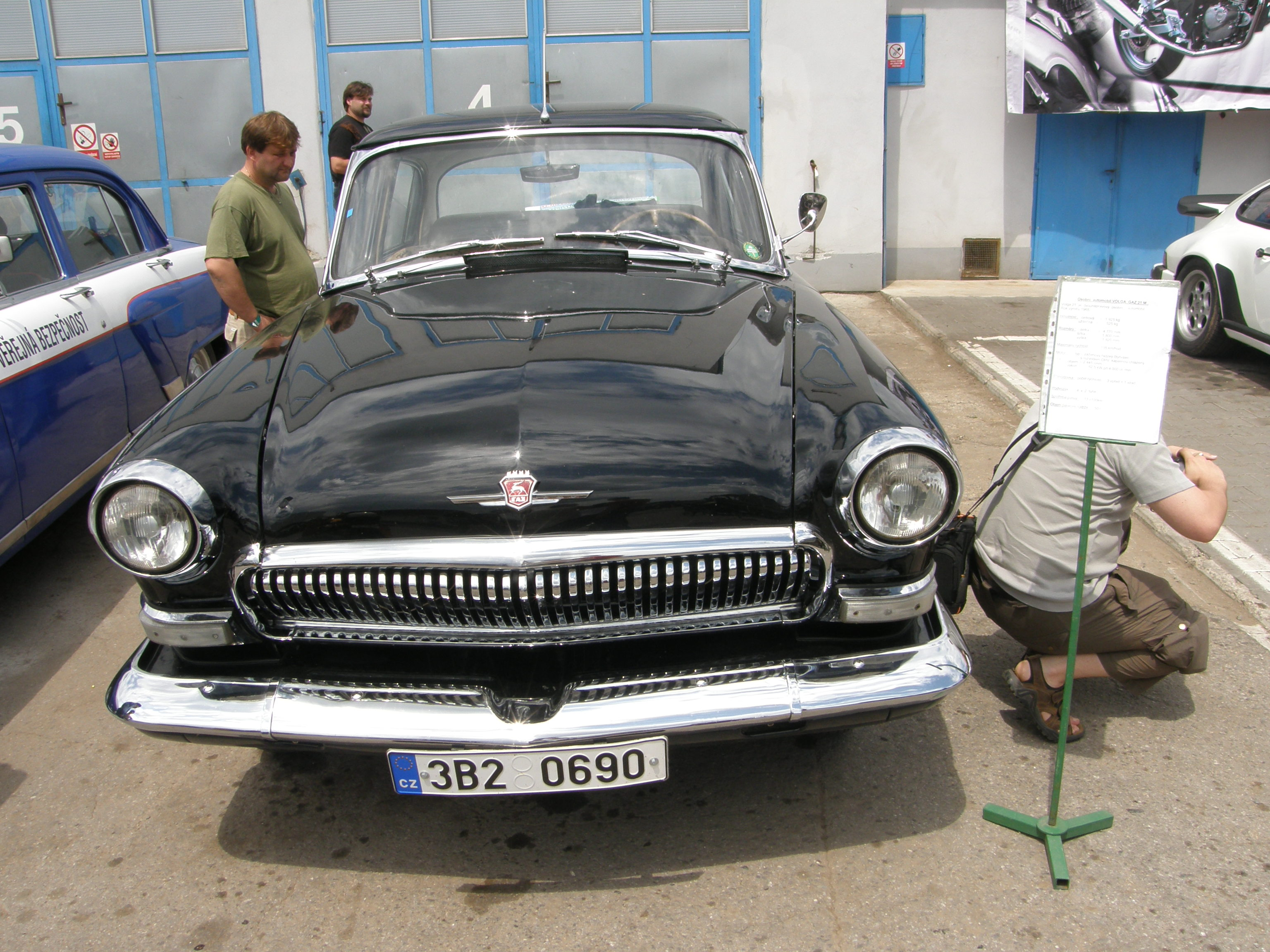
Third series (1962–70)

The third series was produced from 1962 to 1970. The 1962 models dropped the leaping-deer hood ornament, and had a new grille. It used a 6.7:1 compression engine of 75 PS (55 kW; 74 hp), with an optional 7.65:1 compression ratio version producing 80 PS (59 kW; 79 hp) which was usually reserved for export models. The headliner changed from cloth to vinyl, and the radio became optional. It was offered as the standard M21L, M21T taxi, and right-hand drive M21N export model. Also in 1962, GAZ advertised a station wagon/estate model, the M22; most of these were exported or reserved for official use. The first station wagons/estates were delivered in 1963, and were designated M22/M22G (75 PS [55 kW; 74 hp], M22G being the export model), M22T (export, 85 PS [63 kW; 84 hp]); ambulances were M22B (75 PS [55 kW; 74 hp]) and M22BK (85 PS [63 kW; 84 hp]). An M22 prototype four-wheel drive station wagon/estate was also built, as was an M22A van.

Belgian importer Sobimpex N.V. assembled Volgas locally for sale in Western Europe. These were often fitted with diesel engines; the cars arrived in Antwerp without an engine and with the gearbox in the trunk. Originally (beginning in 1960) Sobimpex fitted a 1.6-liter Perkins 4.99 unit; a larger Rover engine supplanted that in 1963, and the more modern Indenor four-cylinder units replaced the Rover engine in 1964. Belgian-built cars were marketed as "Scaldia-Volgas", named after the Latin name for the river Scheldt. While the diesel models cost considerably more than ones with the original engine, they were quite popular for their economy and reliability, and outsold the petrol models in both Belgium and the Netherlands.

== Models ==
The car's large size and tough construction made it popular in the police and taxi trades, and V8-powered versions (designated GAZ M23) were produced for the KGB. An automatic transmission was briefly offered in the late 1950s, but later discontinued due to lack of service stations; through the 1960s, they were used only on the KGB's V8 version, with the controls being very similar to the discontinued "civil" automatic.

The M21 Volga was produced in sedan form from 1956 to 1970 and station wagon form (GAZ M22 Universal) from 1962 to 1970. Over the course of the 1960s, the design began to look outdated, and GAZ developed a boxier, more modern replacement; in 1970, the M21 platform was discontinued. Until the late 1970s, however, spare parts were produced by various plants all over the USSR, and some plants were rebuilding M21s using spare parts, and wrecked and junked cars. In 1988, about 80,000 M21 Volgas were registered in the USSR. A number of pick-up trucks based on the GAZ-21 were also built by various autonomous auto-repair plants all around the country. As these plants worked separately, there was no single design for these vehicles.

The Deluxe variant had additional chrome trim around the windows and spanning the front and rear headlights, with the rear trims being fin-shaped. This model usually also included the 79 hp (59 kW) engine instead of the standard 69 hp (51 kW) one.

One M21 was given to Yuri Gagarin after his orbital flight; Gagarin was very fond of his Volga.

The UAZ-469 all-terrain vehicle uses a GAZ-21A engine, and the RAF-977 minibus used the GAZ-21 engine and drivetrain.

A special-variant GAZ-23 Volga was produced for Soviet special services only, with the 160 PS (118 kW; 158 hp) 5.53-litre V8 engine from the Chaika. These were also equipped with the Chaika's automatic transmission. This allowed the M23 to reach 170 km/h (110 mph). Only 603 M23s were built (between 1962 and 1970).

== Gallery ==
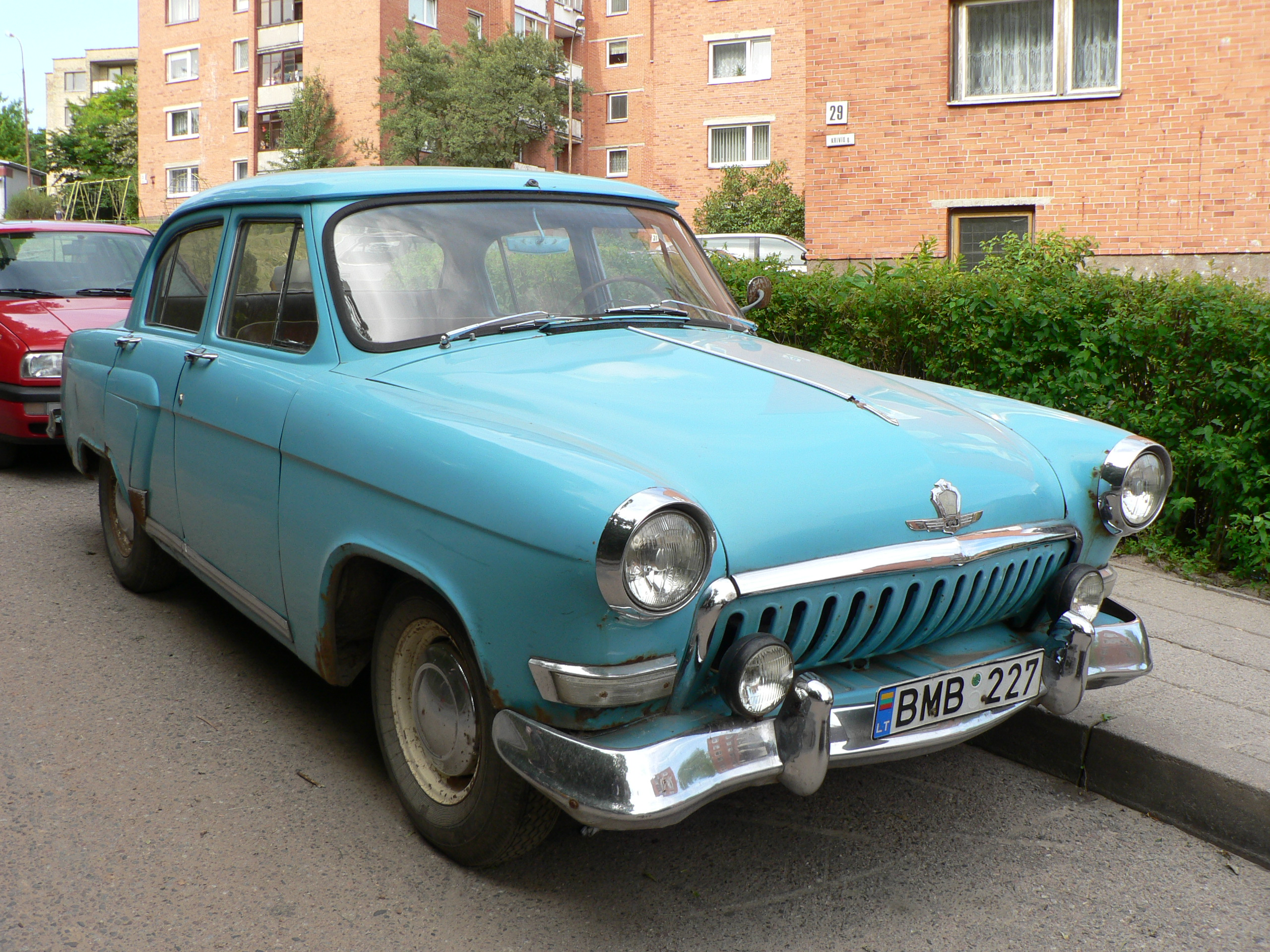
Second series (1959–1962)

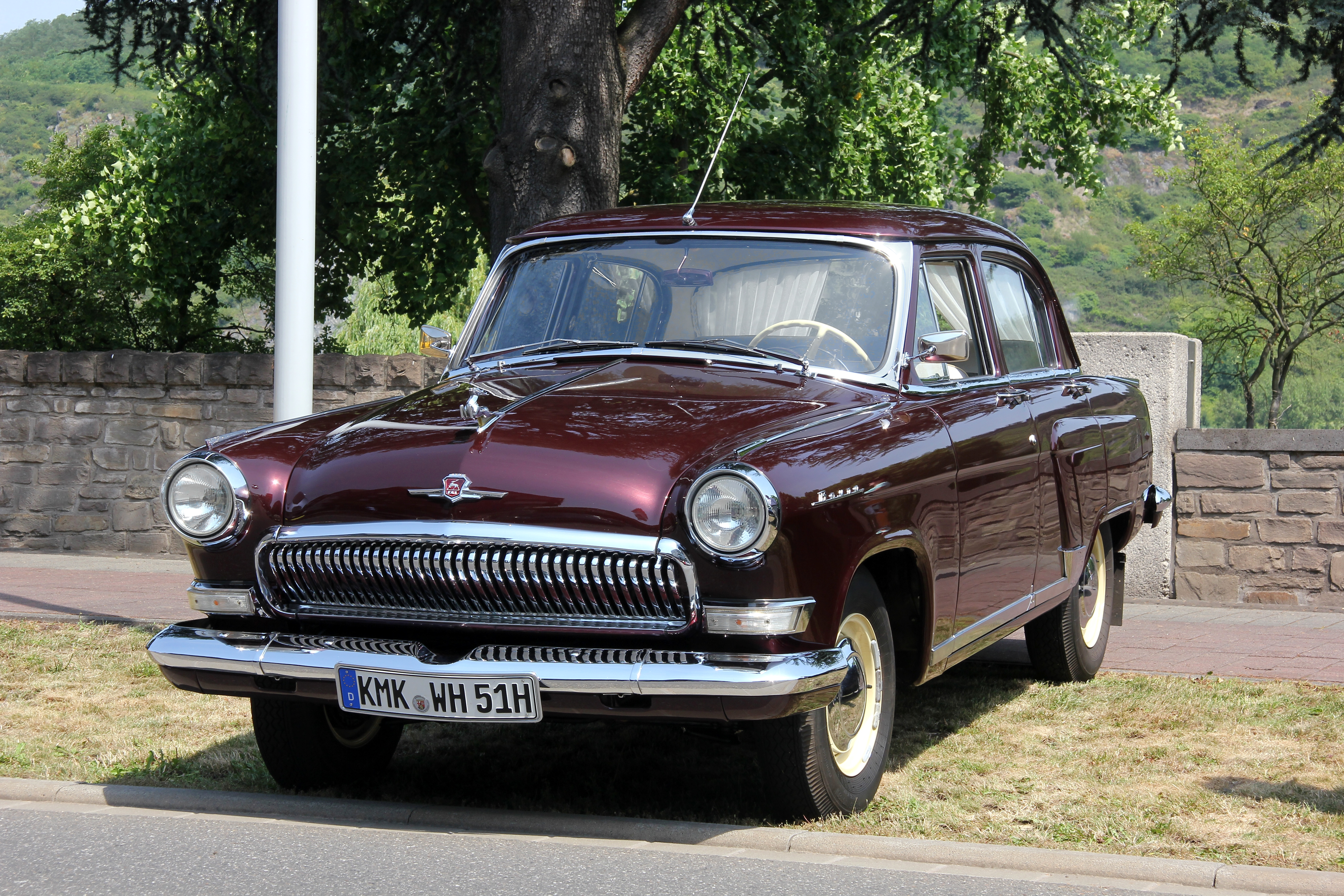
Third series (1962–1970)

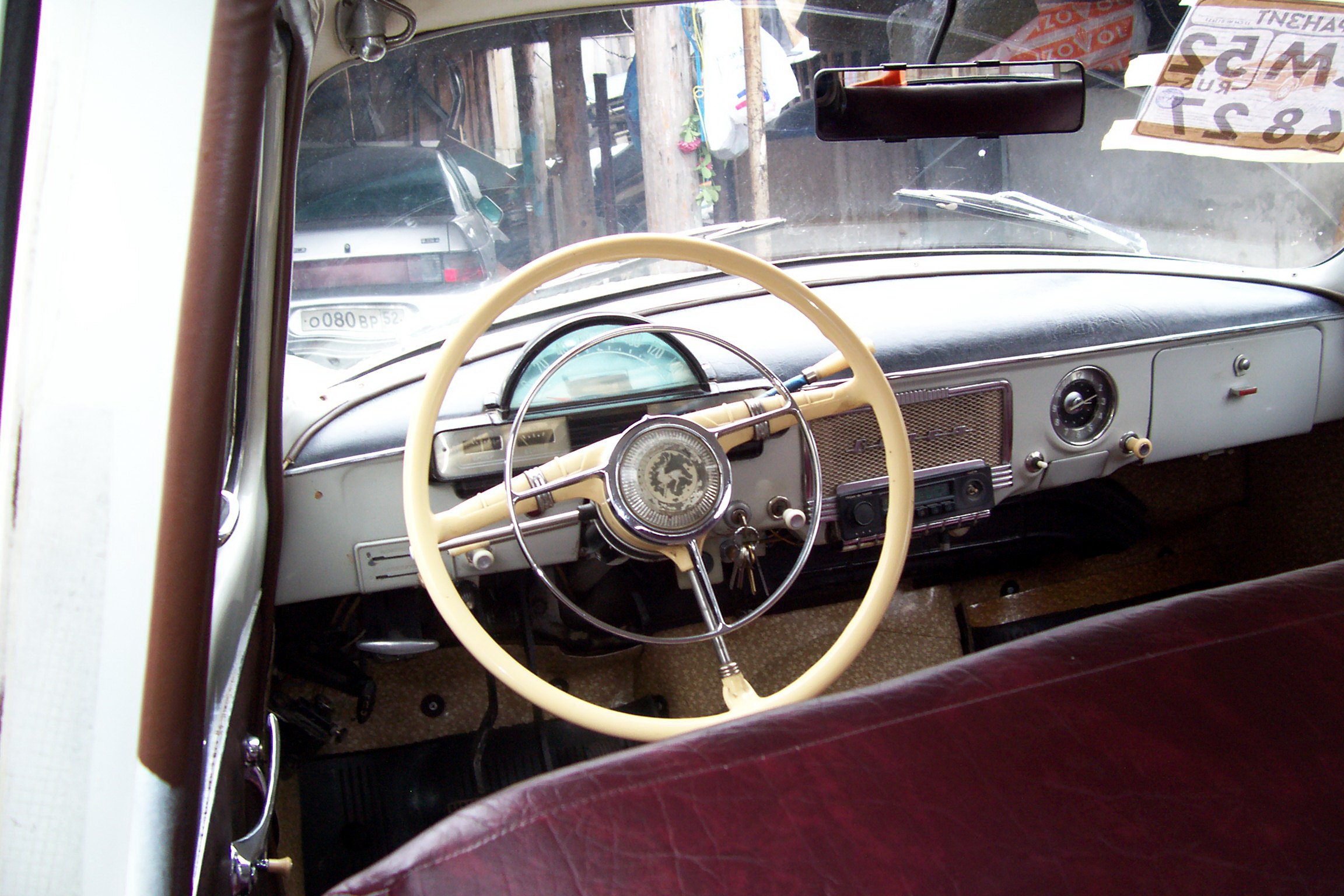
Interior

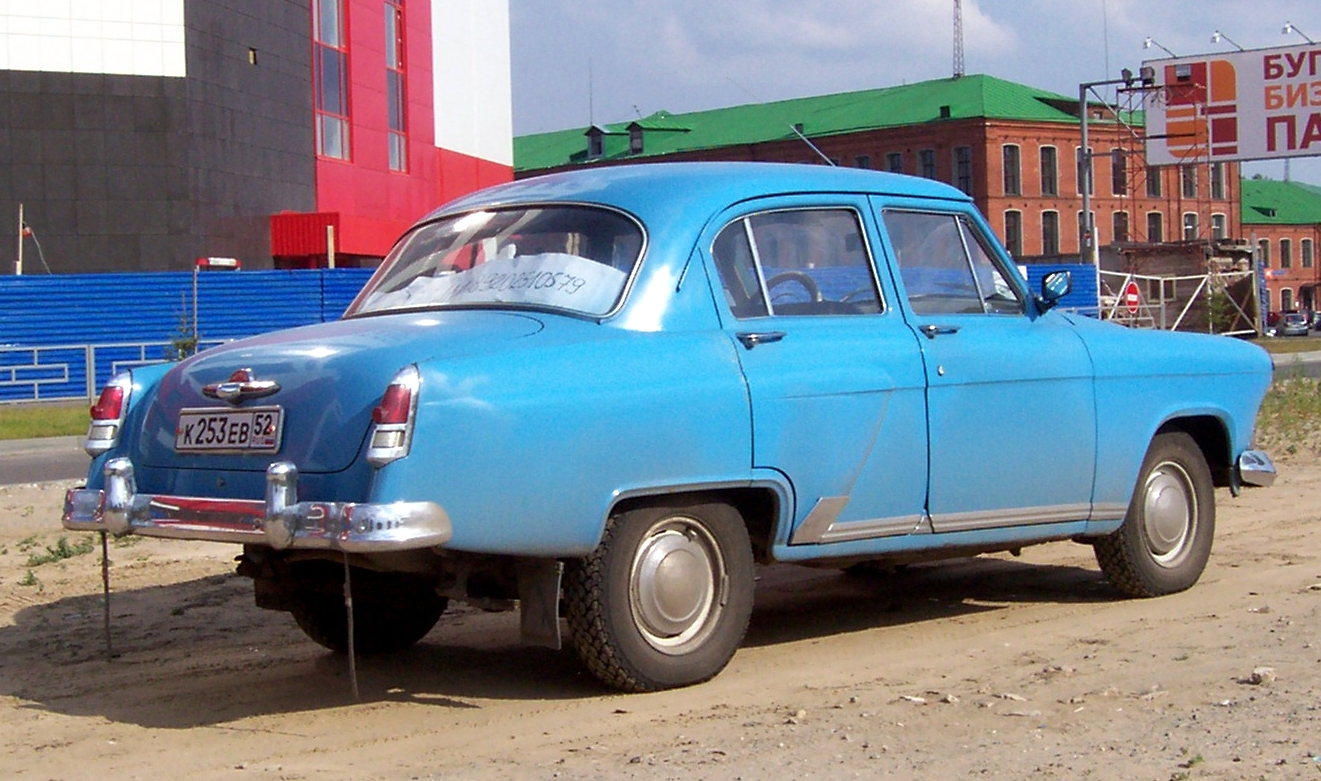
Rear 3/4 view

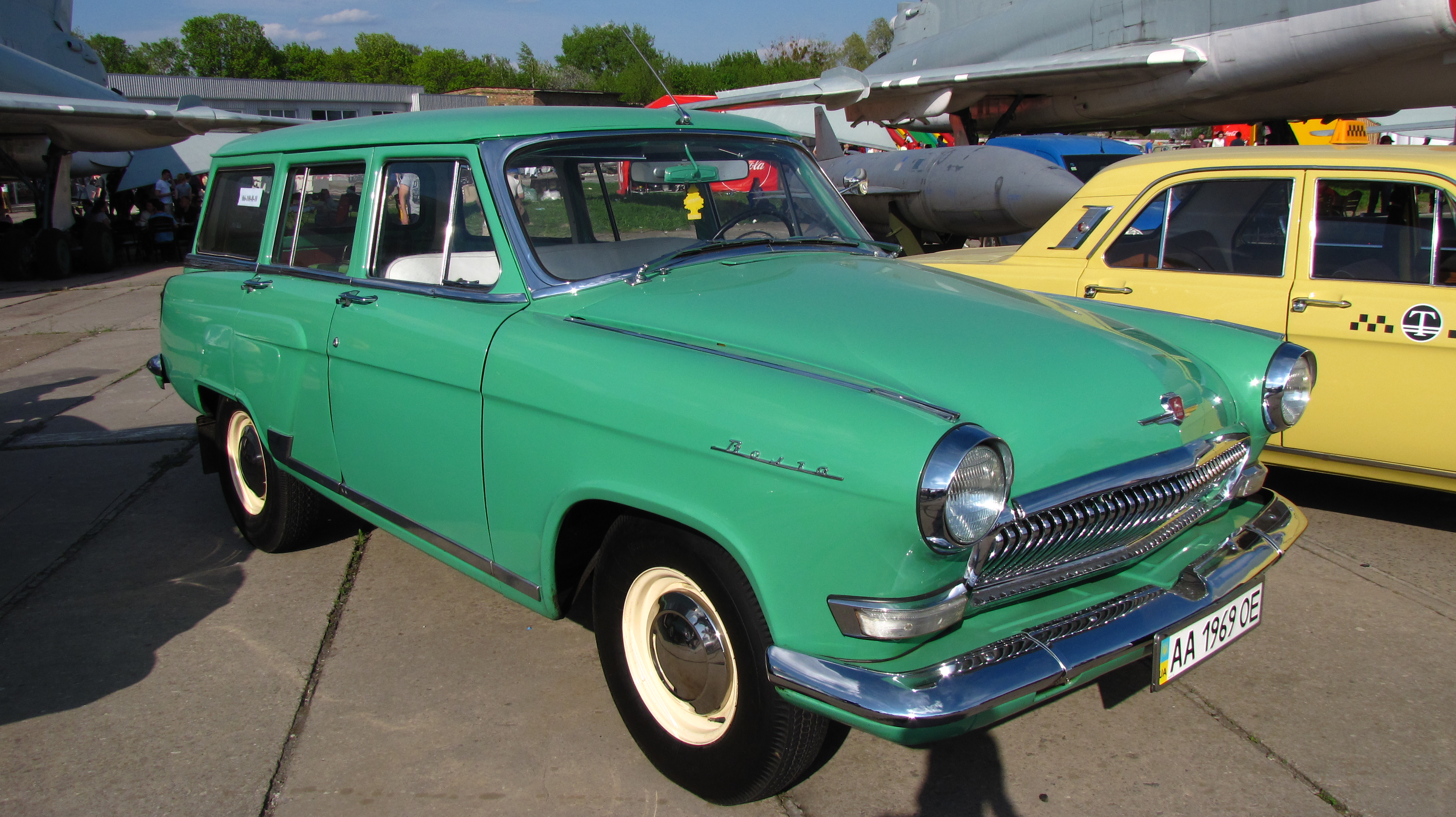
GAZ-22 Volga station wagon/estate in Kyiv, Ukraine

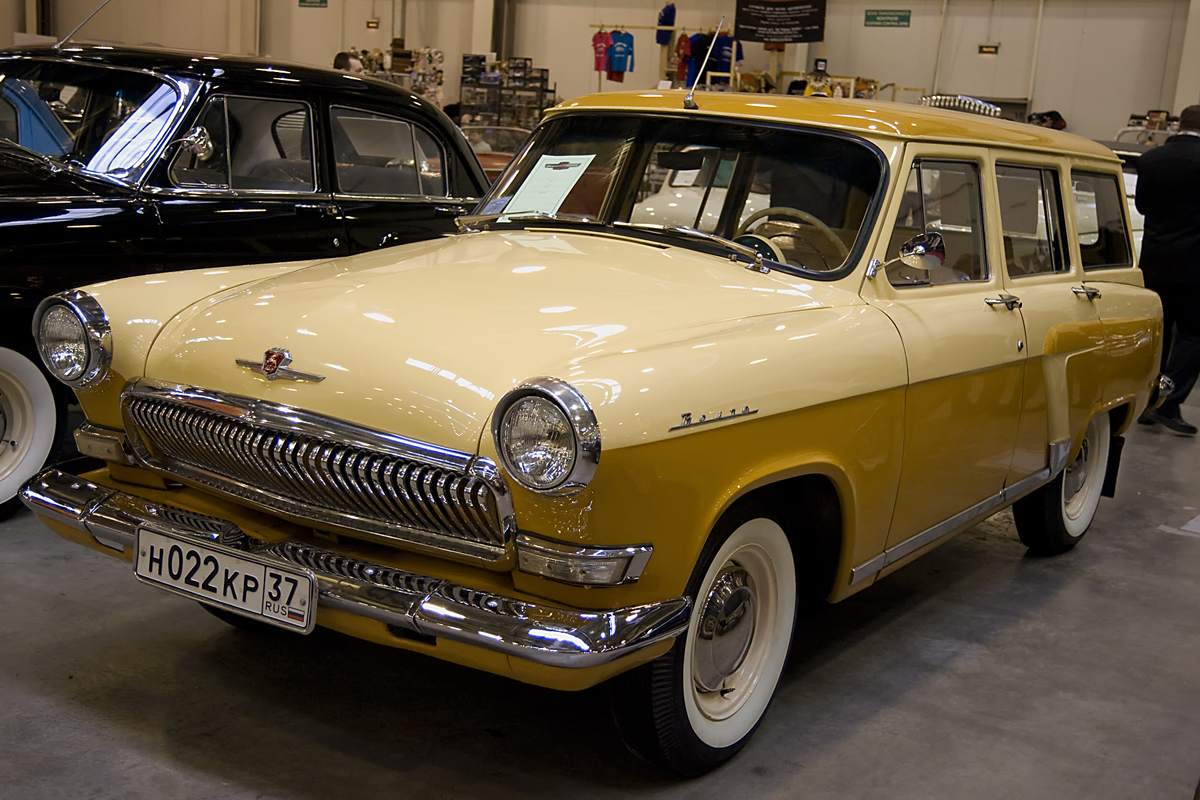
GAZ-22 Volga station wagon/estate

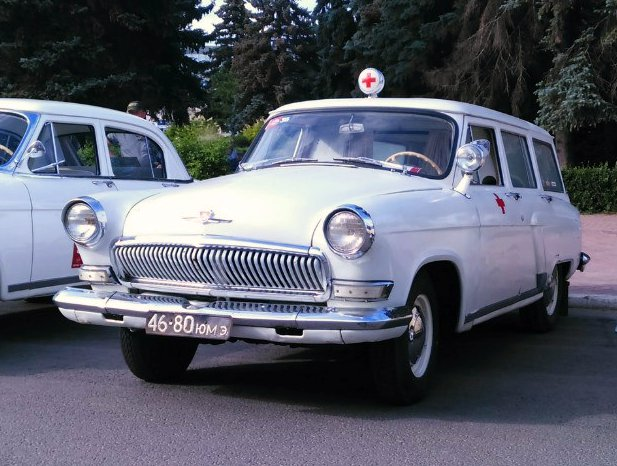
GAZ-22B Volga station wagon/estate (ambulance)

== Popular culture ==
- A GAZ-21 is the main car featured in Rammstein's music video for the song "Du hast".
- In the Soviet cult movie Beware of the Car, the protagonist, Yuriy Detochkin, steals Volga cars from officials abusing their powers.
- A GAZ-21 is the taxi used in the poignant Soviet film 'Three Poplars on Plyuschikha Street'
- The protagonist of the 2009 Russian superhero movie Black Lightning fights crime with his flying car, a black 1966 GAZ-21.
- The car is featured in the mobile game, Retro Garage, which features many other vehicles produced in the Soviet era, as well as some based on German vehicles.
- One of the possible models for the "Black Volga" urban legend is the GAZ-21.
