= Beijing BJ40 =

Chinese off-road vehicle

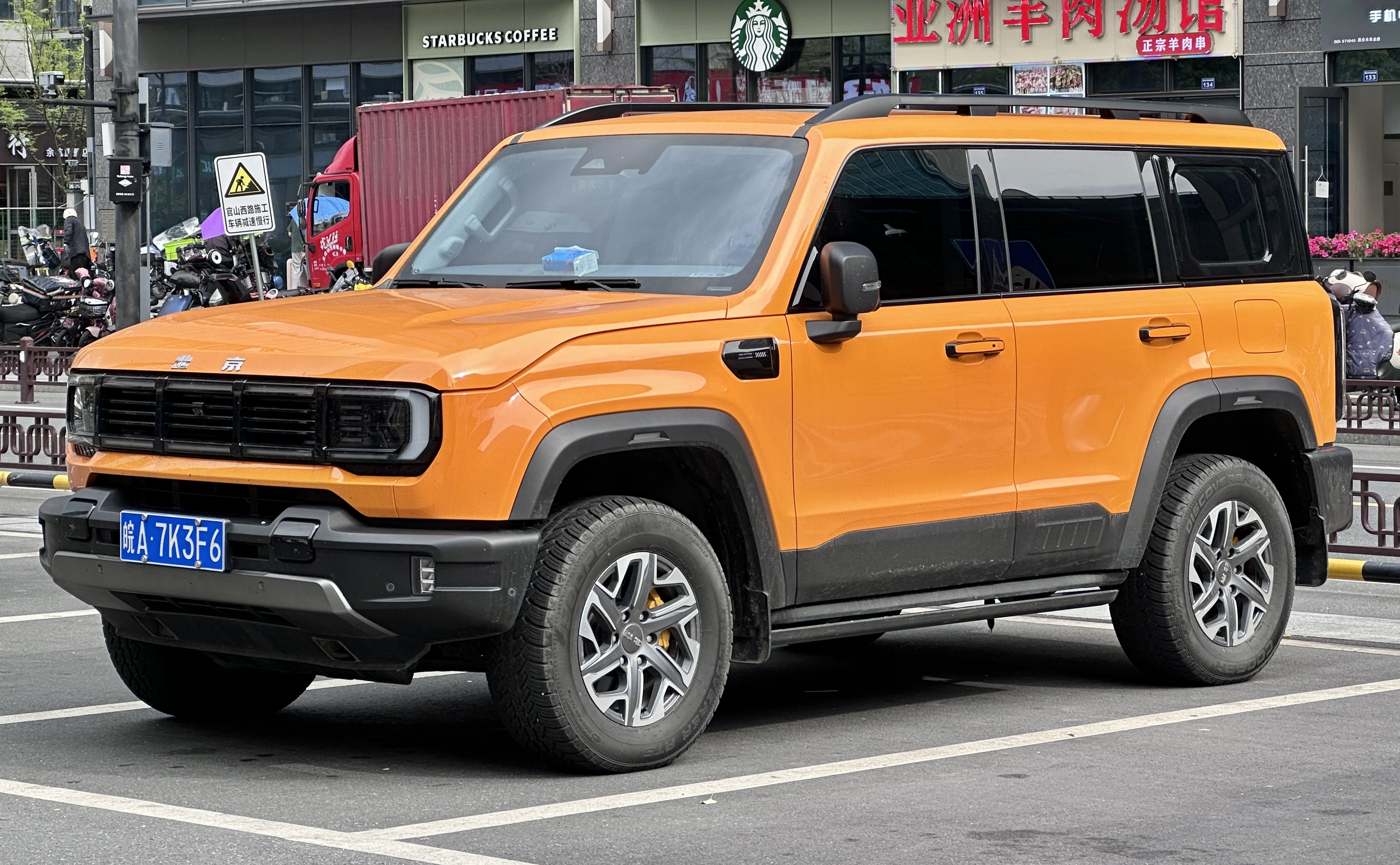
- Second generation Beijing BJ40

Overview
- Manufacturer: BAIC Motor
- Also called: BAIC BJ40 Plus/BAIC BJ40L (4-door); BAIC F40 (pickup); BAIC B40/B70 (During development); Innoson IVM G40 (Nigeria); Nord A7 (Nigeria); Mobius 3 (Kenya); ICH-X K2 (Italy); Aras 3 (Iran); Santana Cajal (Spain)
- Production: 2014–present

Body and chassis
- Class: SUV/Off-road vehicle (J)
- Body style: 5-door SUV; 3-door SUV
- Chassis: Body-on-frame

The Beijing BJ40 is a Chinese off-road vehicle produced by BAIC Motor. Originally branded directly as a BAIC product, the vehicle series was rebadged under the Beijing brand after the brand was introduced in 2019. The exterior styling of the first generation of the vehicle resembles that of the Jeep Wrangler.

== First generation (2014-present) ==
BAIC/Beijing BJ40
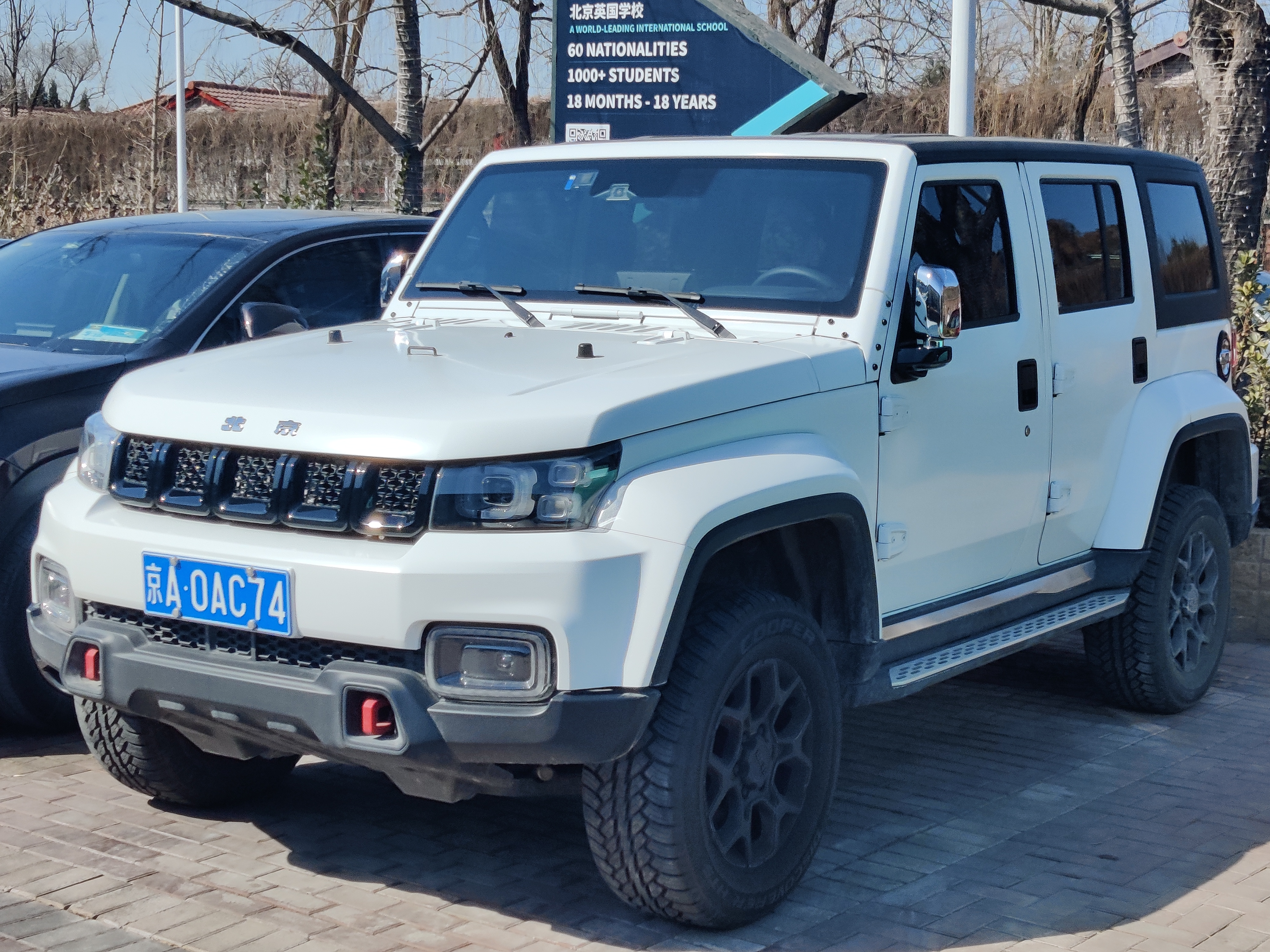

Overview
- Manufacturer: BAIC Motor
- Also called: BAIC BJ40 Plus/BAIC BJ40L (4-door); BAIC F40 (pickup); BAIC B40/B70 (During development); Innoson IVM G40 (Nigeria); Nord A7 (Nigeria); Mobius 3 (Kenya); ICH-X K2 (Italy); Aras 3 (Iran)
- Production: 2013–present 2016–present (BJ40L)
- Model years: 2014–present 2016–present (BJ40L)
- Assembly: Beijing, China; Batna, Algeria; Lahore, Pakistan; Purwakarta, Indonesia; Kaliningrad, Russia
- Designer: Zhang Te

Body and chassis
- Body style: 2-door SUV; 4-door SUV; 2-door pickup truck

Powertrain
- Engine: 2.0 L B205R I4 (turbo petrol); 2.0 L HY4C20B I4 (turbo petrol); 2.3 L B235R I4 (turbo petrol); 2.4 L G4CA I4 (petrol)
- Transmission: 5-speed manual 6-speed automatic 8-speed automatic

Dimensions
- Wheelbase: 2,450 mm (96.5 in); 2,730 mm (107.5 in) (BJ40L)
- Length: 4,350 mm (171.3 in) (BJ40); 4,630 mm (182.3 in) (BJ40L)
- Width: 1,843 mm (72.6 in)
- Height: 1,834 mm (72.2 in) (BJ40); 1,861 mm (73.3 in) (BJ40L)
- Curb weight: 1,830 kg (4,034 lb) (BJ40); 2,005 kg (4,420 lb) (BJ40L)

Chronology
- Predecessor: BAIC BJ2020; BAIC BJ2022

The first generation BJ40 is divided into four trim levels, the BJ40 S (Super), BJ40 P (Professional), BJ40 C (City) and BJ40 SE (Special Edition). They were designated for different target consumer groups.

=== BAIC BJ40 ===
The BAIC B40/BJ40 originally debuted as a concept during the 2010 Beijing Auto Show, and it was controversial as it resembled the iconic Jeep Wrangler.

The BJ40 production car debuted at the 2013 Guangzhou Auto Show. The BJ naming system stands for Beijing-Jeep, because in the 1980s Beijing Automotive Engineering Company (predecessor of today's BAIC) signed an agreement with the American brand Jeep, forming the company Beijing Jeep Corporation (which would soon acquire other companies and to become BAIC). Through this agreement, the BAIC BJ40 (Beijing-Jeep) would go on sale based on the Jeep Wrangler.

The BJ40 comes with a 2.4 liter four-cylinder petrol engine producing 107 kW (143 hp) and 217 N⋅m (160 lb⋅ft) of torque mated to a 5-speed manual gearbox with a minimum ground clearance of 210 mm, an approach angle of 37°, departure angle of 33°, and a 24° vertical angle.

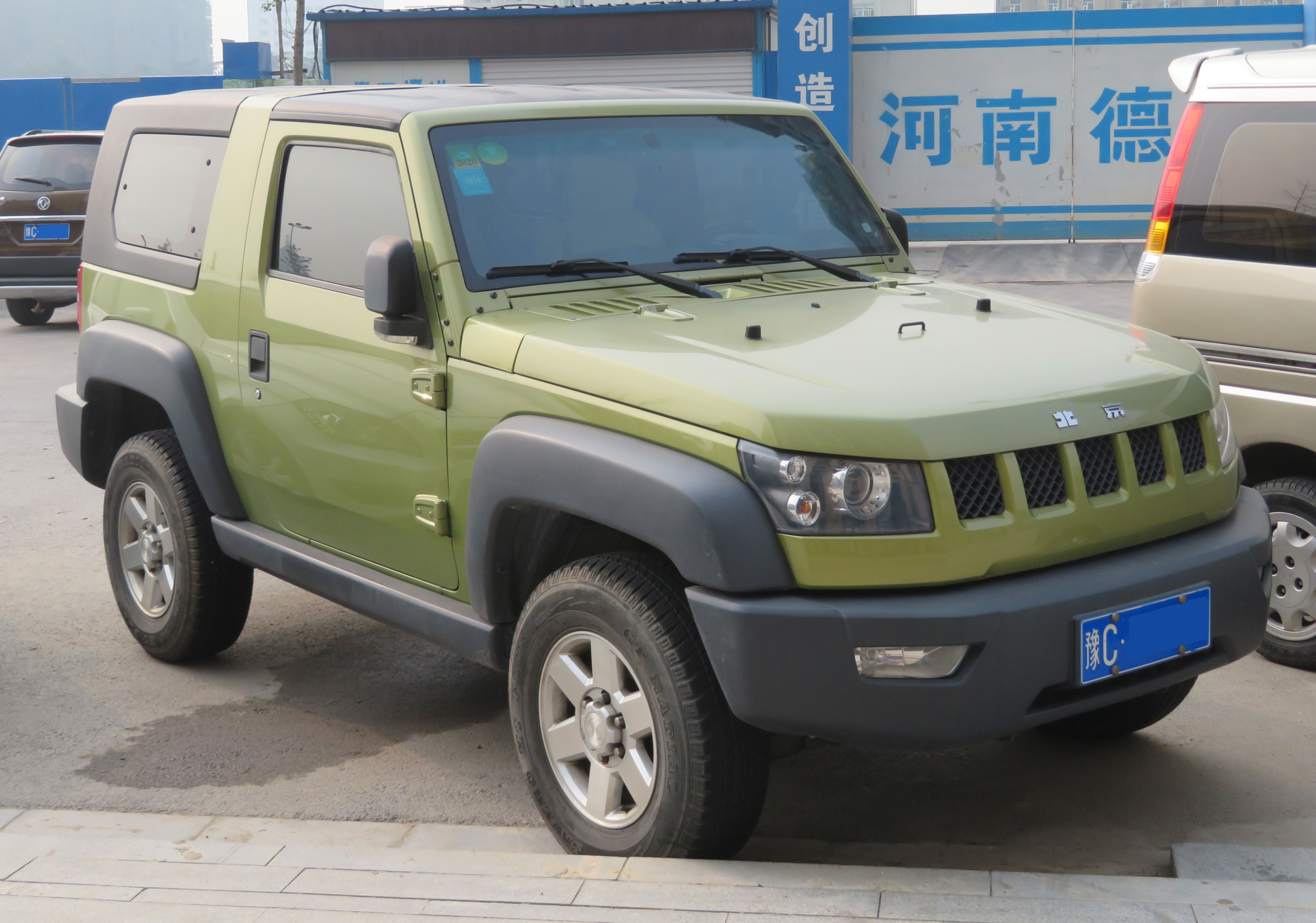
Beijing BJ40 front

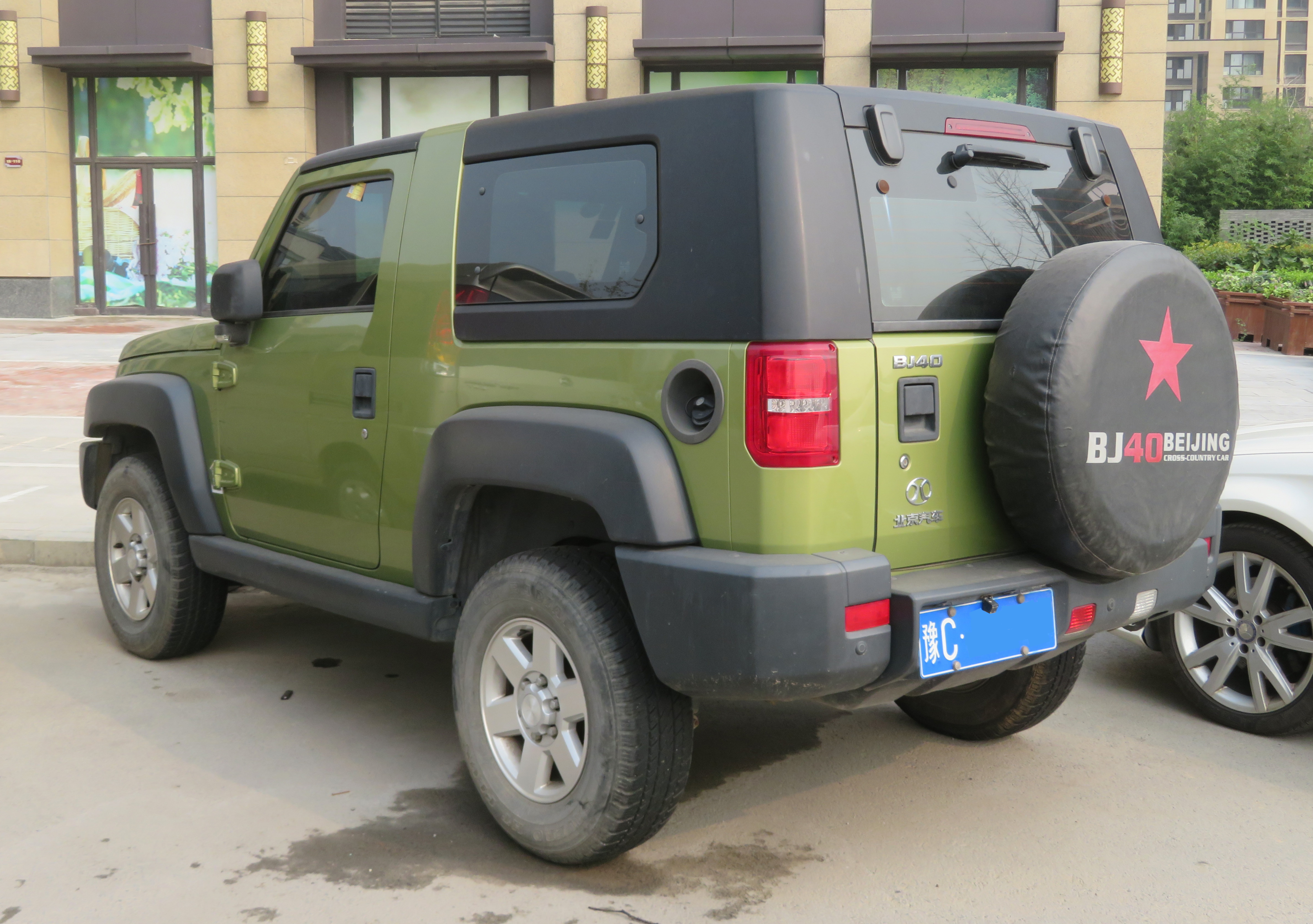
Beijing BJ40 rear

=== BAIC BJ40L ===
The BAIC BJ40L is the 4-door long wheelbase version of the BJ40 and it debuted on the 2016 Beijing Auto Show which also previewed the facelift of the BJ40. Prices for the BJ40L ranges from 129,800 to 179,800 yuan.

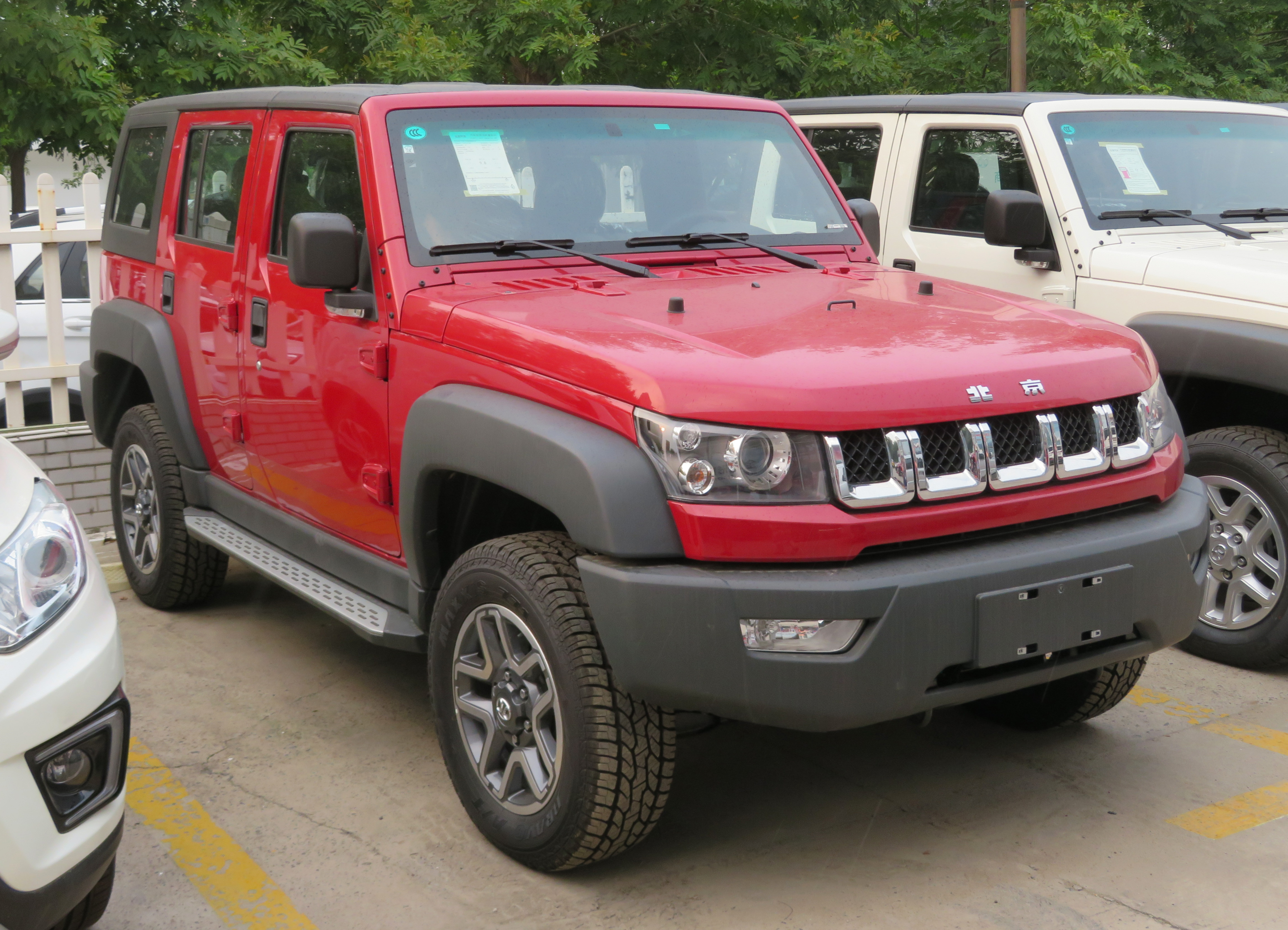
Beijing BJ40L front

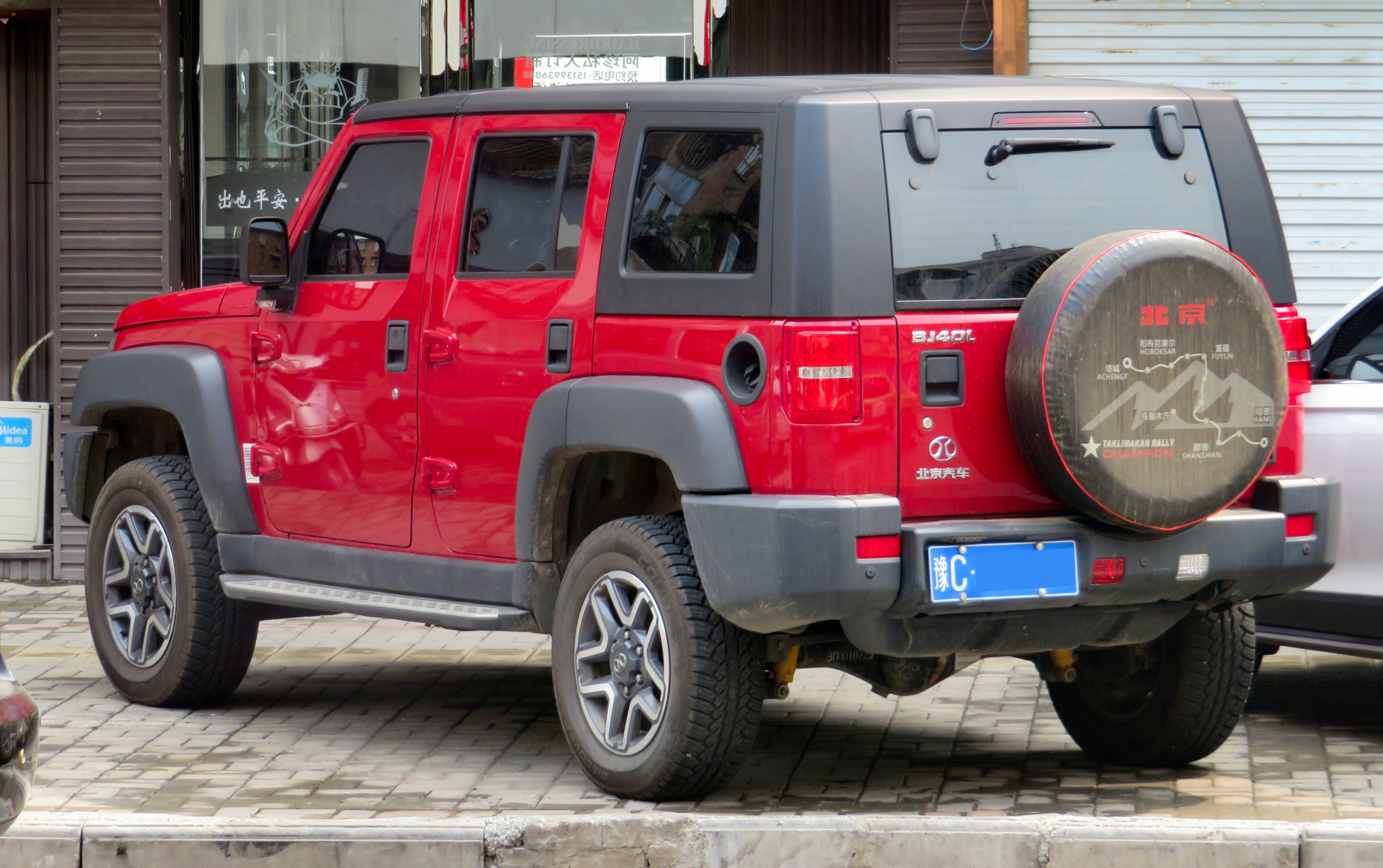
Beijing BJ40L rear

==== 2019 facelift ====
A facelift was launched for the BJ40 2019 model year. The facelift cancelled the "L" nameplate with the 4-door models renamed to BJ40 Plus. The 2019 model also features a revised front fascia design and updated tail lamps and rear bumper. The update also features a revised front and rear end styling, and a 2.0 liter turbo engine producing 160 kW (215 hp) and 320 N⋅m (236 lb⋅ft) of torque. Foreign market BJ40 Plus, like one destined to Indonesia, has a different 2.0 liter turbo made by HYCET producing 165 kW (221 hp) and 380 N⋅m (280 lb⋅ft) of torque.

A version called the Beijing BJ40 Plus City Hunter Edition was also revealed in 2019 via the 2019 Shanghai Auto Show. The BJ40 City Hunter Edition is part of the BJ40 "C" series trim level which stands for "City". In terms of technology, the infotainment system is equipped with an upgraded 2.0 intelligent voice interaction system, 12.3-inch full LCD instrument panel, 10-inch smart car display and streaming media with an automatic anti-glare rear view mirror. The version also has interior features including surround sound, voice control, power seat and three-speed heating seat to meet the needs of urban users of the "C" trim.

The Beijing BJ40 City Hunter Edition is powered by a 2.0 liter turbocharged direct-injection gasoline engine with a maximum power of 160 kW (215 hp) and a peak torque of 320 N⋅m (236 lb⋅ft) mated to a 6-speed automatic transmission supplied by ZF. The Beijing BJ40 City Hunter Edition is also equipped with an electronically controlled time-sharing four-wheel drive system, and provides a variety of different driving modes for different terrains. On 2020, Sazgar signed an agreement with BAIC to produce the BJ40 in complete knock down in Pakistan and by 29 May 2021 production of the SUV started.

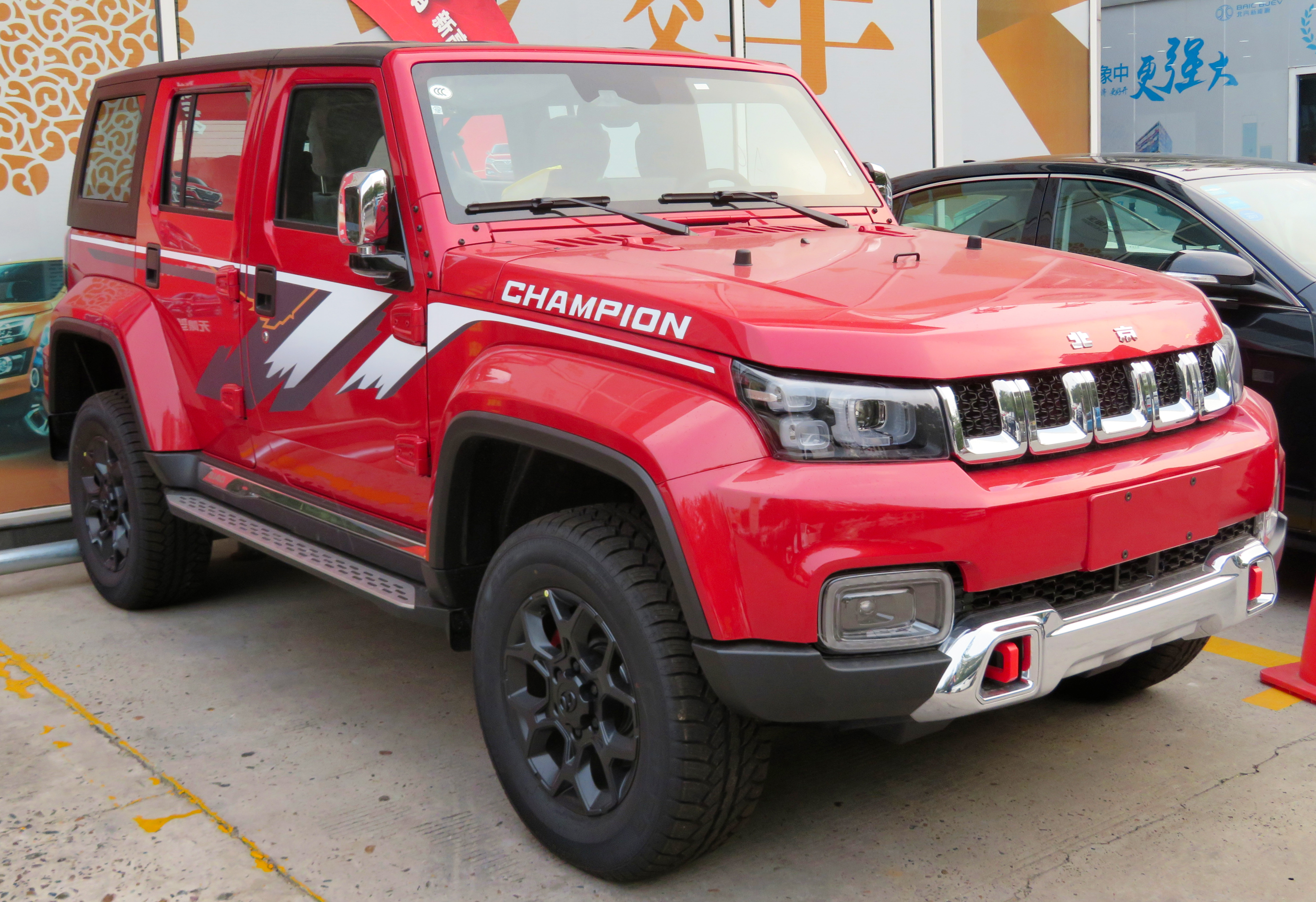
Beijing BJ40 Plus front

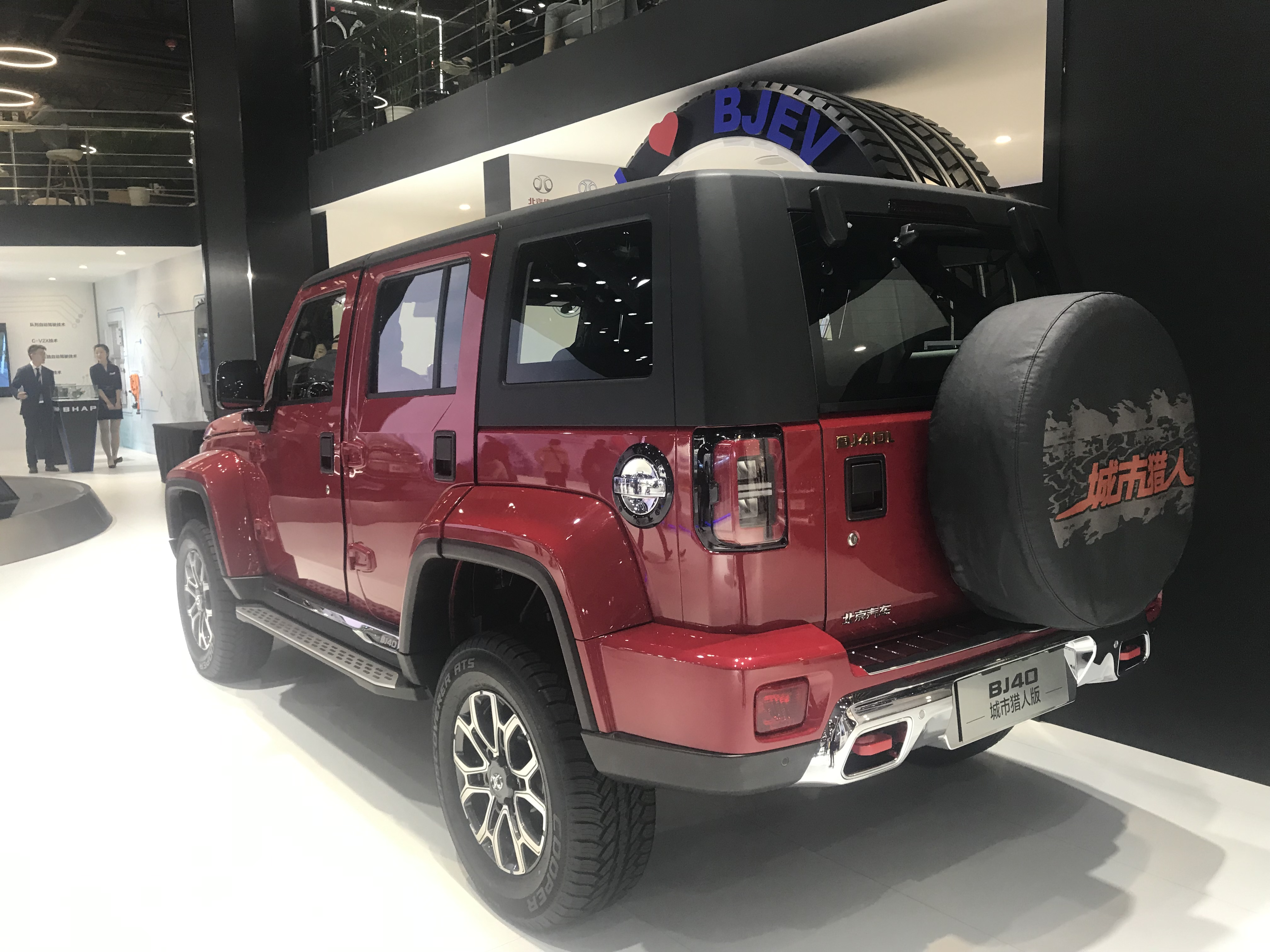
Beijing BJ40 Plus rear

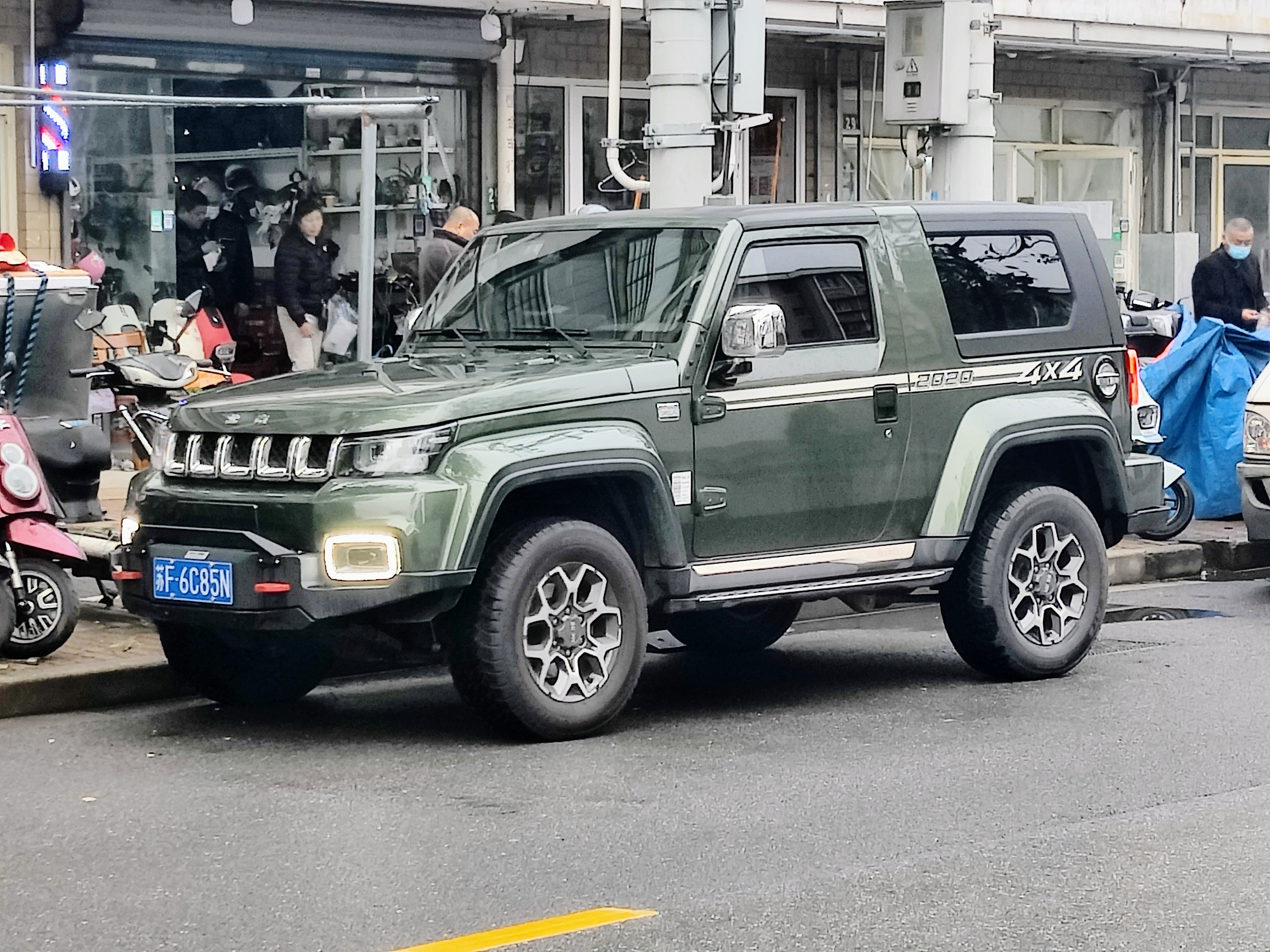
Beijing BJ40 2019MY facelift (2-door)

==== 2020 facelift ====
For the 2020 model year, Beijing Off-Road launched the BJ40 Tribute 2020 version was launched with two configuration models, priced at 169,900 yuan and 200,000 yuan.

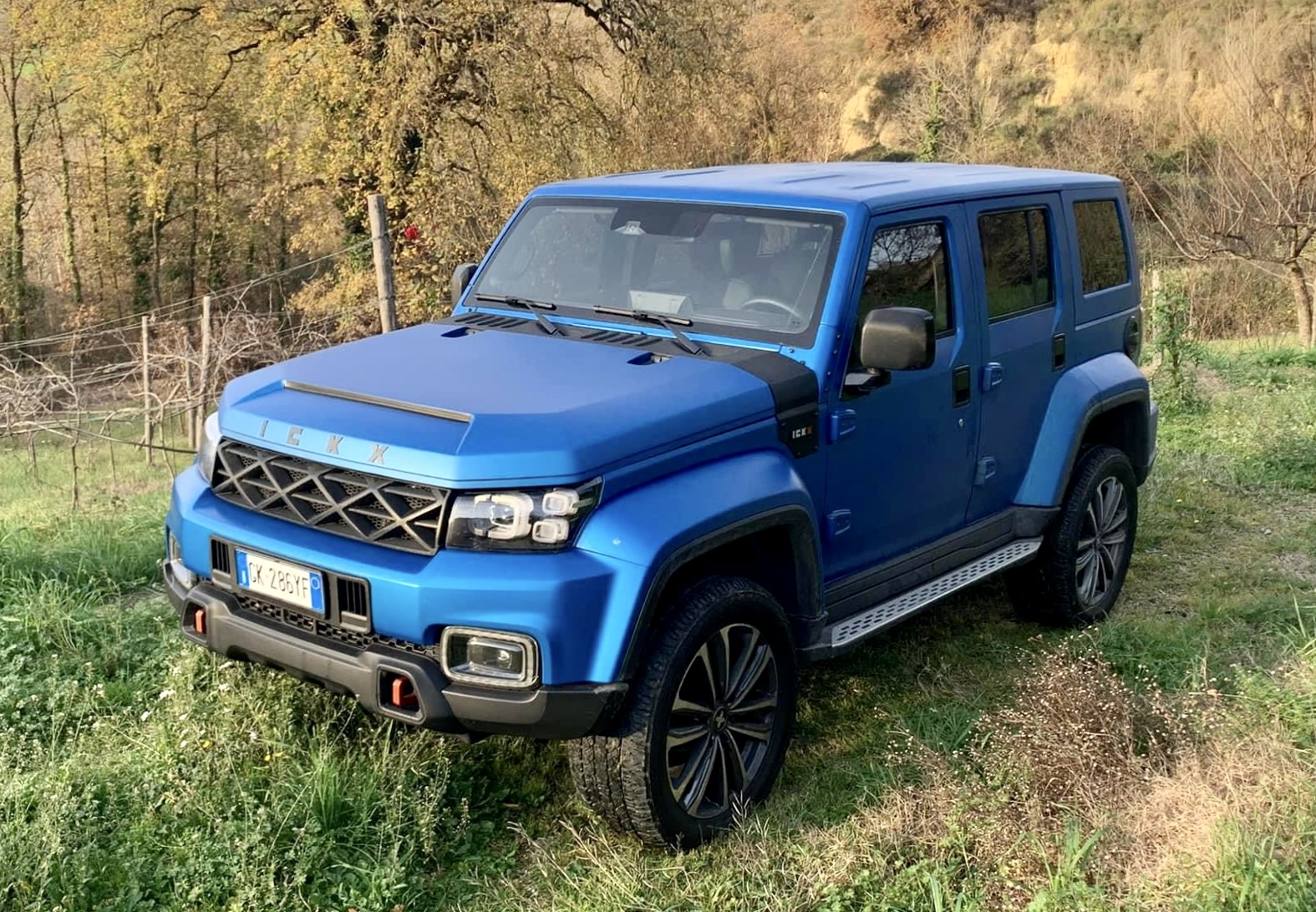
ICH-X K2

=== Beijing F40 ===
On September 16, 2019, BAIC launched the Beijing off-road F40 pickup, priced at 149,800 yuan (~US$21,200). The Beijing F40 is the pickup model of Beijing BJ40 with adjusted appearance details and adopts a single-row cabin design. The second row space was replaced by an exposed cargo bed. The Beijing F40 pickup is powered by 2.3 liter turbocharged engine shared with the BJ40.

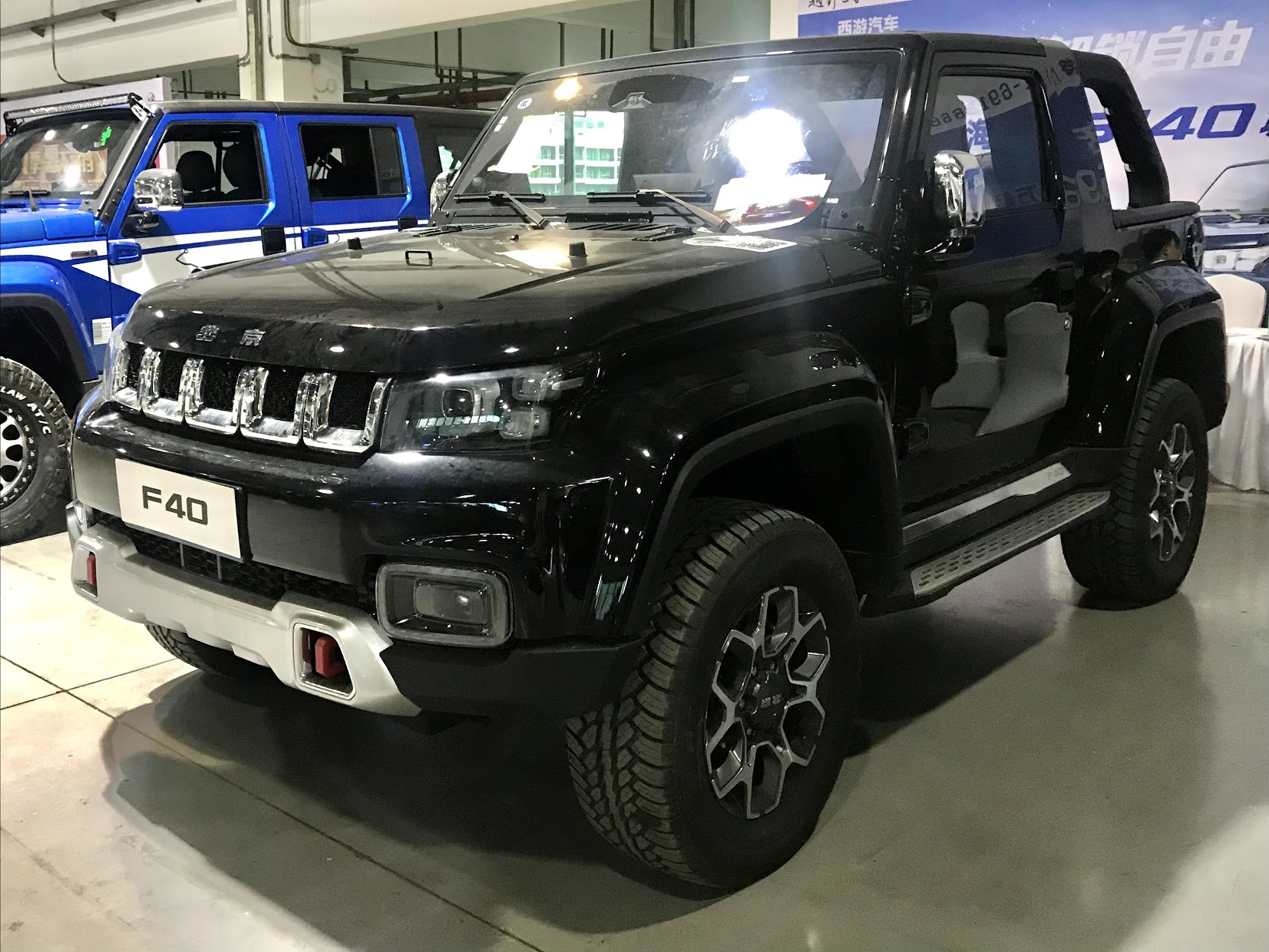
Beijing F40 front

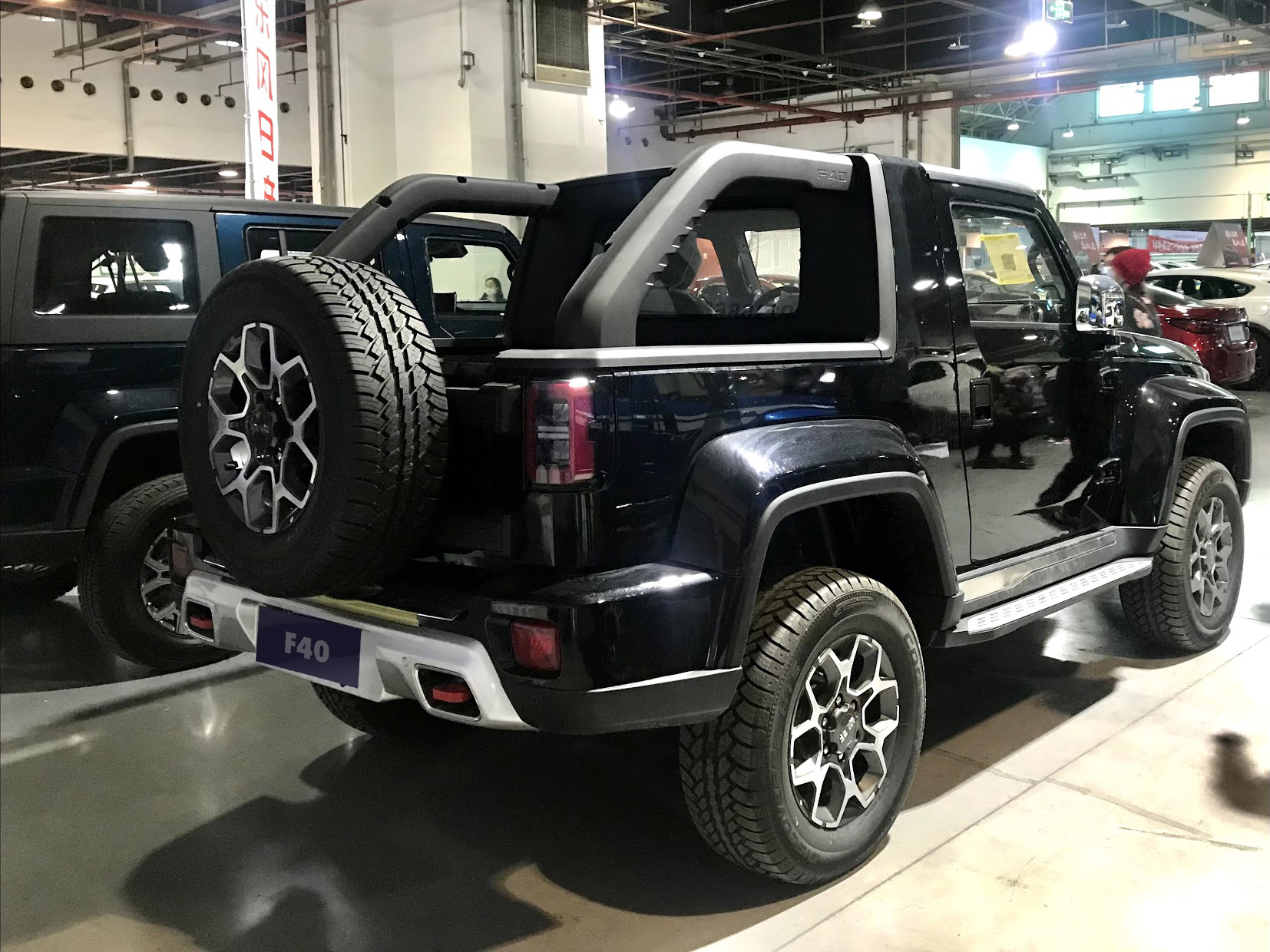
Beijing F40 rear

== Second generation (2023–present) ==
Beijing BJ40 II
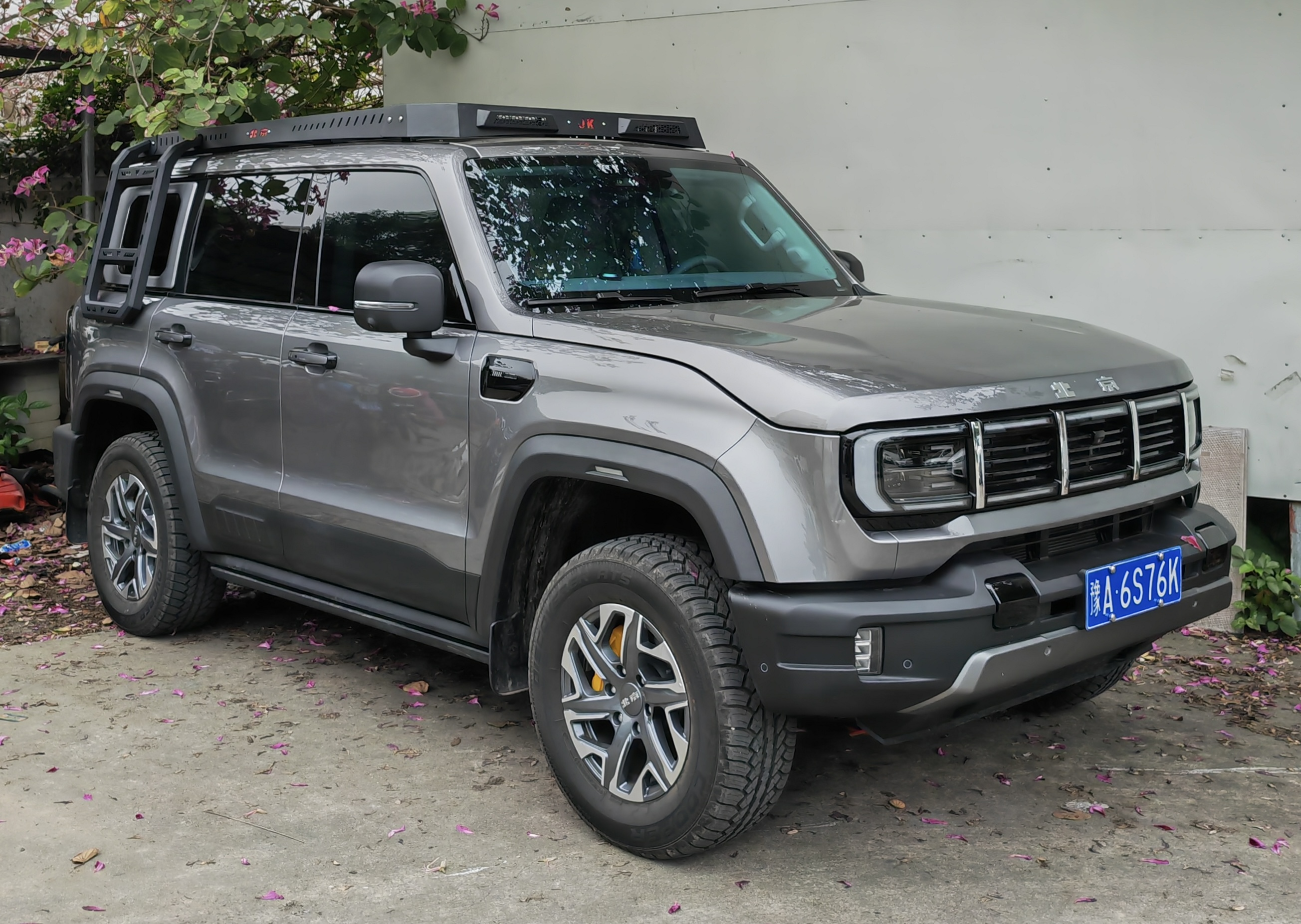

Overview
- Manufacturer: BAIC Motor
- Also called: Beijing B40e (Philippines); Santana Cajal (Spain)
- Production: 2023–present
- Model years: 2023–present
- Assembly: Beijing, China; Linares, Spain

Body and chassis
- Body style: 5-door SUV

Powertrain
- Engine: 2.0 L I4; 1.5 L Turbo I4 (EREV)
- Transmission: 8-speed automatic
- Range: 1200 KM (EREV)
- Electric range: 152 KM

Dimensions
- Wheelbase: 2,760 mm (108.7 in)
- Length: 4,790 mm (188.6 in)
- Width: 1,940 mm (76.4 in)
- Height: 1,929 mm (75.9 in)

Chronology
- Predecessor: BAIC BJ2020; BAIC BJ2022

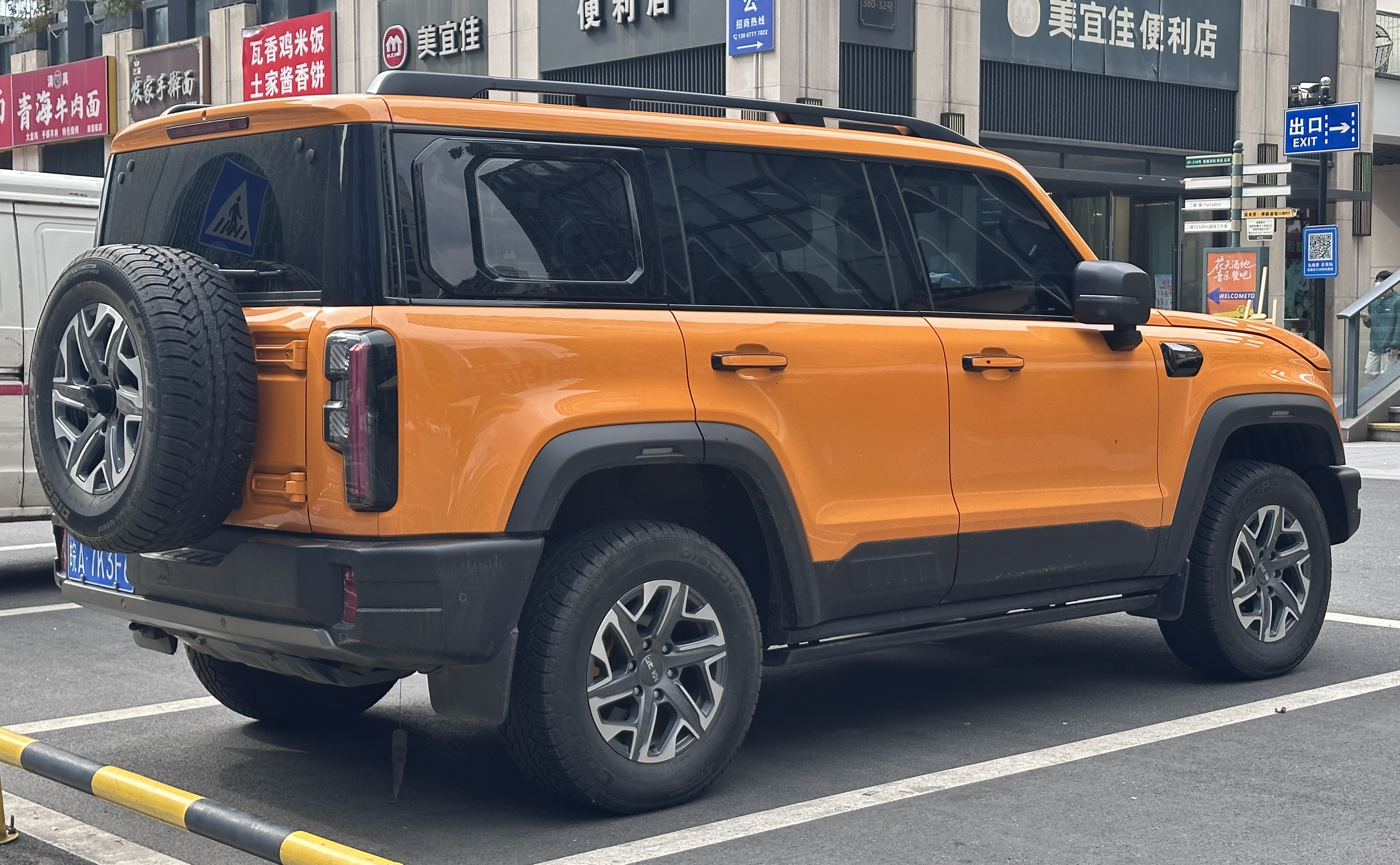
Second generation Beijing BJ40 rear

The second generation BJ40 was unveiled in August 2023, and was planned to be launched in November 2023. The second generation model has a 37° approach angle and 31° departure angle with a 24° ramp angle and a 230 mm ground clearance. The powertrain is a 2.0-liter turbocharged engine paired with an 8-speed automatic transmission, developing a maximum power output of 180 kW (241 hp) and 395 N⋅m (291 lb⋅ft) of torque. Acceleration from 0 to 100 km/h (62 mph) is within 10 seconds.

=== EREV version ===
In April 2025, Beijing Automotive introduced a Range-Extended Electric Vehicle (EREV) version known as the BJ40e (B40e, BJ41e in some markets).

The BJ40e features a four-wheel drive system powered by a 1.5T engine acting as a generator, paired with front and rear electric motors. This setup marks a significant departure from the traditional internal combustion engine (ICE) version. The 1.5T generator delivers a maximum power of 138 kW, while the front and rear motors produce 153 kW and 250 kW, respectively. Combined, the motors have a total power output of 403 kW (540 hp) and 655 N⋅m (483 lb⋅ft) of torque, enabling the vehicle to accelerate from 0 to 100 km/h (62 mph) in 5.5 seconds.

The BJ40e also incorporates a full-time four-wheel drive system with a decoupled design, reportedly achieving a maximum wheel-end torque of 9,000 Nm. Additionally, the system features a dynamic torque response time of 60ms, enabling rapid adjustments to changing road conditions.

In terms of off-road performance, the BJ40e has an approach angle of 38°, a departure angle of 37°, a wading depth of 750 mm, and a minimum ground clearance of 215 mm. It is equipped with a 40.3 kWh lithium-ion battery, offering a pure electric range of 152 km and an average fuel consumption of 8.68 L/100 km. When fully fueled and charged, the vehicle achieves a comprehensive driving range of over 1,200 km.

Built on a body-on-frame structure, the BJ40e features a front double wishbone suspension and a rear multi-link independent suspension. It is also equipped with three differential locks - front and rear electromagnetic mechanical differential locks and an intelligent electric central differential lock - along with an all-terrain intelligent ATSS control system. This system includes 4 city commuting modes, 6 off-road modes, and 1 track mode.

The battery is housed within the frame and BAIC say it features a quick-disassembly design. The BJ40e comes standard with 275/55 R20 tires and low-air drag wheel rims, which are wider and larger than those on the ICE version.

== Sales ==
Year	China		
Year	BJ40	EREV	Total
2023	18,498	—	18,498
2024	29,469	186	29,655
2025	26,335	37,299	63,634
