= BAW BJ212 =

BJ212/2020
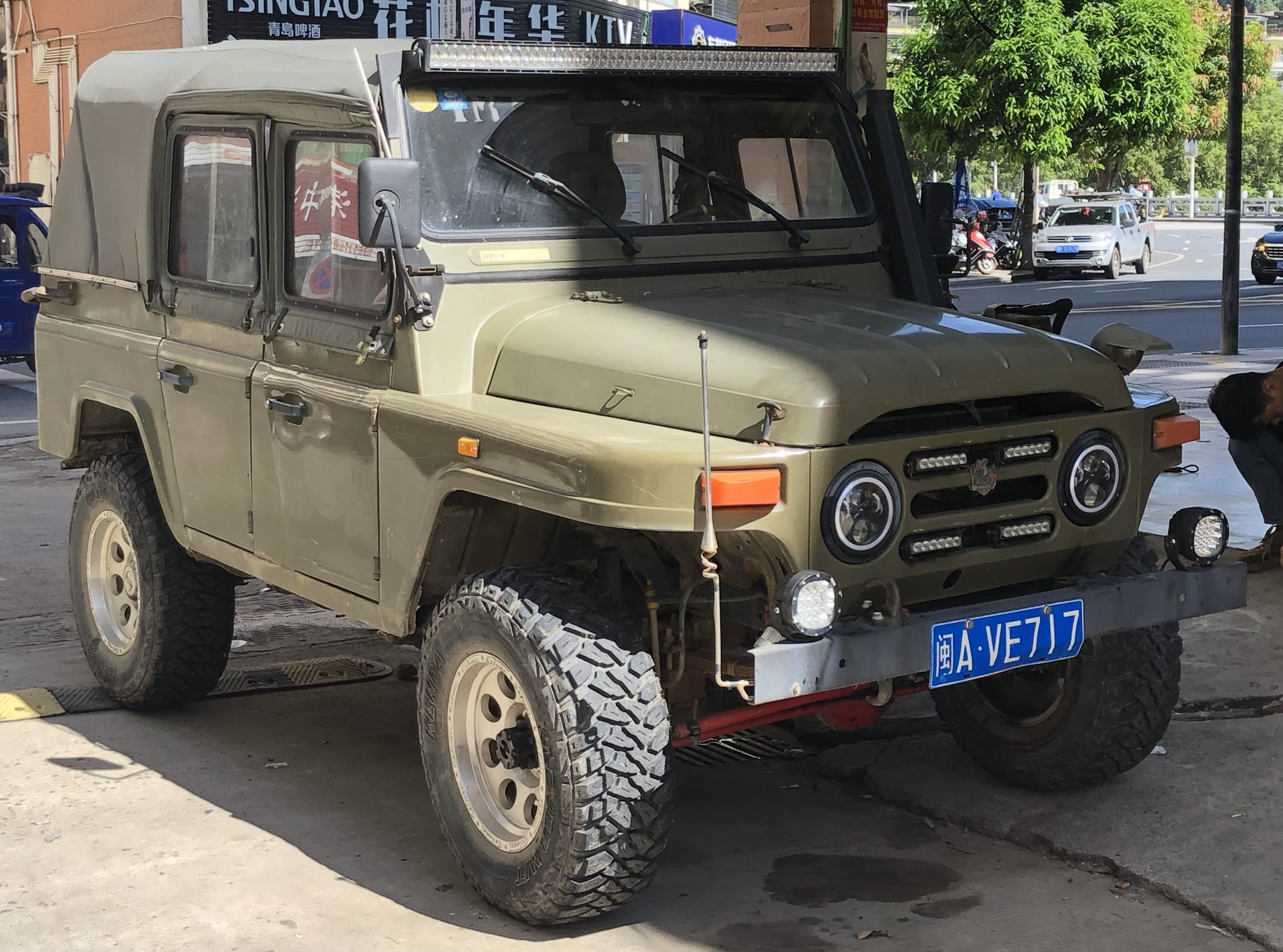

Overview
- Also called: Beijing BJ2020; BAW City Cruiser; BAW Kuangchao; BAW Ludi; BAW Zhanqi; Hebei Xinkai Lieying; Pyeonghwa Ppeokkugi 2008/Pyeonghwa Ssangma 0108 (North Korea); Tianjin TJ210 C; 212 Classic (from 2024)
- Production: 1965–present

Body and chassis
- Class: SUV
- Layout: Front engine, four-wheel drive

Powertrain
- Engine: Petrol: 1499 cc 4A91 turbo I4 (2019 Zhanqi); 1998 cc 4G20B I4 (BJ212, Zhanqi); 2237 cc 4G22B/LJ491QE1 I4 (Zhanqi); 2445 cc BJ492Q I4; 2466 cc C498QA I4 (BJ2020V); Diesel; 2.8 L JE/BJ493 ZQ turbo I4 (Zhanqi)
- Transmission: 5 speed manual 4 speed manual

Dimensions
- Wheelbase: 2,300 mm (90.6 in)
- Length: 4,080 mm (160.6 in)
- Width: 1,840 mm (72.4 in)
- Height: 1,870 mm (73.6 in)

Chronology
- Predecessor: Beijing BJ210 jeep
- Successor: Beijing 2022; 212 T01

The Chinese Beijing Automobile Works, formerly Beijing Jeep, BJ212 (Chinese: 北京212) and BAW BJ2020 is a four-wheel drive, originally a 2.4 L (2445 cc) four-cylinder gas-engine powered (four-cylinder diesel engines were added in the 2000s) light-duty offroad utility vehicle in the half tonne class. The original design, depending in large part on Russian off-roaders from UAZ and possibly developed in conjunction with the UAZ-469, debuted in 1965 as the Beijing BJ212. It has been known as the BJ2020 series since the Chinese car classification system was changed in 1989.

The BJ212 succeeded the BJ210 model 4x4, the manufacture of which was transferred to Tianjin's First Auto Works which produced it under the name of TJ210 C. Tianjin's First Auto Works also produced variants with two metal half-doors and an extended wheelbase version with four metal doors.

== History ==
The Beijing BJ212 was a further development of the earlier Beijing BJ210 jeep, and was larger and heavier than it. The design used many parts from the GAZ-69 jeep. The chassis, axles, and suspension come from the GAZ-69 while the engine is a Chinese-built version of the 2.45-litre ZMZ-21A engine used in numerous Soviet vehicles.

It is commonly used by the Chinese government (particularly the armed forces), but is also commercially available. Various versions of the Jeep are today sold under the names of Zhanqi, Jinxuanfeng, City Cruiser, Kuangchao, and Ludi. The BJ212 was expressly developed for use by the Chinese military as well as by lower-level cadres. Semi-legal copies were also built by Xinkai in Hebei, beginning in 1984.

By the early 2000s, the Xinkai-built version was sold as the Lieying ("Falcon"), a copy of the Zhanqi four-door hardtop, equipped with the 2.2-liter GW491QE (a copy of the Toyota 4E engine, also built in Hebei by Great Wall).

Since 2012, the Beijing Automobile Works (北京汽车制造厂有限公司, Běijīng qìchē zhìzào chǎng yǒuxiàn gōngsī）has been producing the BJ212 and Zhanqi in Huanghua, Hebei（河北省黄骅市, equipped firstly with the 2.0 liter 4G20 engine (a copy of the Toyota 4Y engine, built by Brilliance Auto Xinchen XCE in Sichuan), then a turbocharged 1.5 liter Mitsubishi engine and a turbocharged 2.4 liter Mitsubishi engine (Built in Shenyang, Liaoning Province by Hangtian Mitsubishi, a joint venture of Mitsubishi and state owned Hangtian Group), because the 4G20 engine is unable to reach National VI Emission Standard.

== Development ==
=== BJ212 ===
- BJ212 - (1964–1986) Standard five-seat version
- BJ212A - Long wheelbase eight-seat version
  - BJ212F - BJ212A with a solid tent
- BJ212E - Designed in 1986. With a Perkins diesel engine and a new transmission. Also used on a Jeep Cherokee-engined prototype with 15-inch wheels built the same year.
- BJ 121 - (1980–1986) two-wheel drive pickup and derivatives
  - BJ 1021 - (1986-201?) a renamed version of the long wheelbase 2WD BJ 121
- BJ 222 - (1980–1986) four-wheel drive pickup and derivatives, originally called the BJ 211. Replaced by the BJ2032 series

The vehicle appeared in 1965 as the successor to the Beijing BJ210, a smaller vehicle. There is a similarity to the Soviet UAZ-469. The manufacturer was initially Beijing Automobile Works. From 1983 this company operated together with the American Motors Corporation the Beijing Jeep Corporation. According to a source, this Joint venture continued production. A source indicates that the model designation was abandoned in 1989 and the same model was released under two new model codes.

=== BJ2020 ===
The BJ212 was renamed and renumbered as the BJ2020 and was produced from 1986 to 2005.

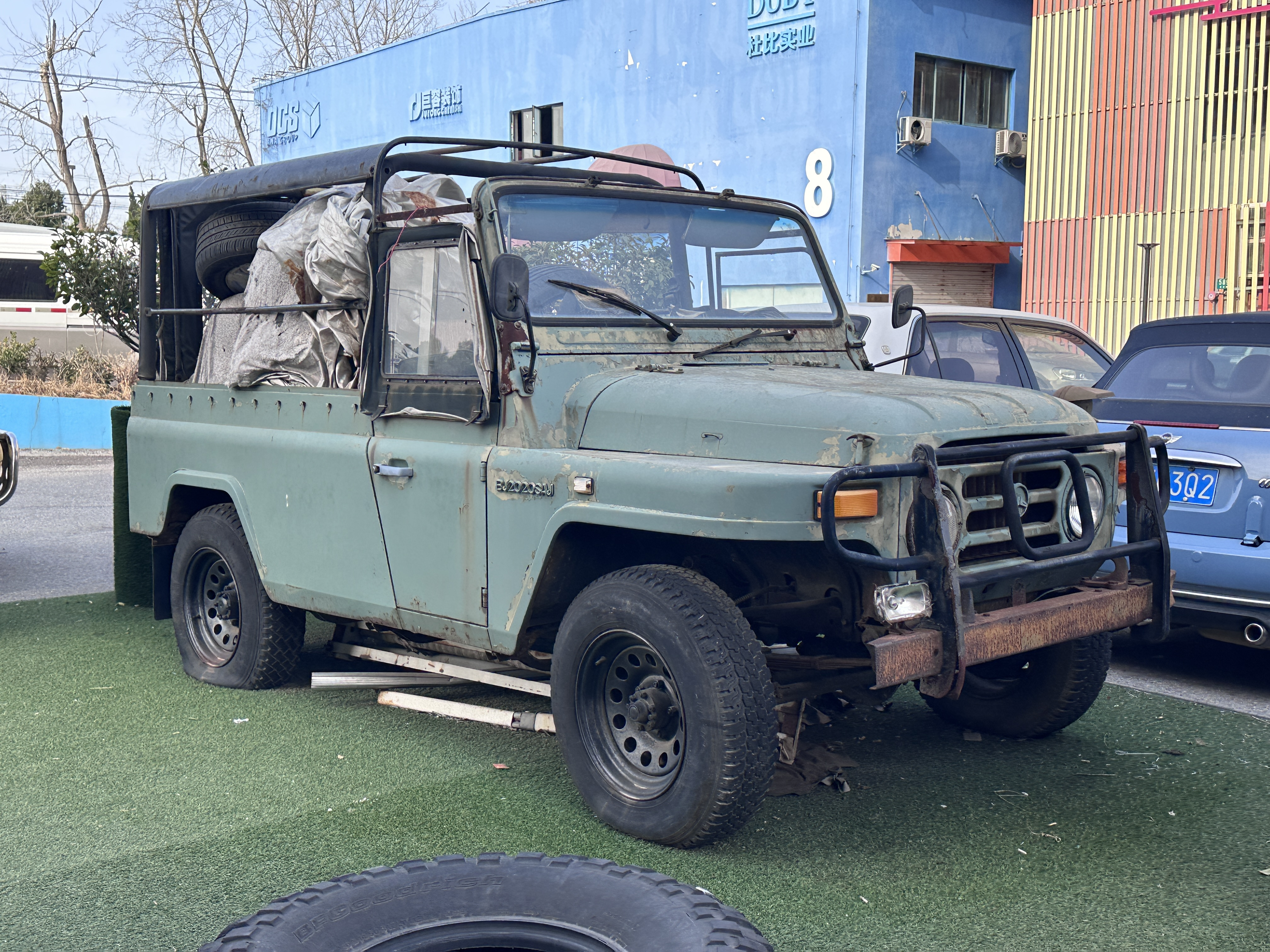
BJ2020SAJ

In 1989 the following models still used the original body:

- BJ2020 SAF1 as a convertible with three doors and eight seats, 2.2-liter engine with 76–77 kW (102–103 hp), all-wheel drive
- BJ2020 SAU1 with 93 kW (125 hp) BJ492 engine displacement of 2.45, 12 liters fuel per 100 kilometers.
- BJ2020 SAQU1 with the same engine.
- BJ2020 SAQF1 with the first-mentioned engine.
- BJ2023 S1CU1 as a convertible with four doors and five seats with the larger engine.
- BJ2032 SAQ with four doors, five seats and all-wheel drive
- BJ1021 SAQ as a two-door pick-up
- BJ1021 SAJ as a convertible two-door pick-up
- BJ2032 SE pick-up with four doors, five seats and all-wheel drive
- BJ2032 SA with all-wheel drive
- BJ1021 SA as a convertible pick-up with two-wheel drive
- BJ2032 S as a two-seat pick-up with all-wheel drive
- BJ1021 S as a two-seater pick-up with two-wheel drive

Data is known for the BJ212 E from 1982 with a four-cylinder engine having 92 mm bore, 92 mm hub, 2445 cm^{3} displacement and 70 hp power. The wheelbase is 2300 mm. The vehicle is 3860 mm long, 1750 mm wide and 1910 mm high. The empty weight is given as 1520 kg.

In 1993, the model was modernized and BJ2020 S.

From 1997 to 2000, there was the Ludi BJ2020 T. It was also based on BJ212.

In 1998 the model appeared with the additional name Jinxuanfeng with a revised front that had a lot of plastic, in the following explanations:

- BJ2023 F as a convertible with five doors, five seats and the smaller engine and all -wheel drive
- BJ2023 Q1 as station wagon with five doors, four seats and the larger engine and all -wheel drive
- BJ2023 Q1F1 with the smaller engine
- BJ2020 Saqu1 as a station wagon with three doors and the larger engine
- BJ2020 SAQF1 with the smaller engine

Another source states that a variant Kuangchao appeared in 1998. A 2.5-liter engine and a 2.7-liter engine, each with 100 hp, are known for 2000. The model was available with two different buildings:

- BJ2020 SGZ as a Cabriolet with four doors and five seats
- BJ2020 SMZ as a station wagon with five doors and five seats

In 2000 the Zhanqi variant was presented on the Beijing Auto Show. The front design is similar to the Jeep Wrangler. The following explanations are known:

- BJ2024 Z2Q1F1 as a station wagon with five doors, five seats, all -wheel drive and the smaller engine
- BJ2024 Z2Q1E with a 2.8-liter-diesel engine and 92 hp power
- BJ2024 Z2Q1U1 with the larger engine
- BJ2023 Z2CKF1 as a convertible with four doors and five seats, all -wheel drive and the smaller engine
- BJ2023 Z2CKU1 with the larger engine
- BJ2023 Z2Q1E with the diesel engine
- BJ6460 ZHF1 with three doors and ten seats
- BJ5030 a station wagon with the smaller engine
- BJ2032 ZAQF1 with four doors, five seats and all -wheel drive
- BJ2032 ZAQH1
- BJ2032 ZAqu1 as a pick-up
- BJ2032 ZAF1 with four doors, five seats and all -wheel drive
- BJ2032 Zah1
- BJ2032 ZAU1 as a convertible pick-up
- BJ2032 ZU1 as a two-seater pick-up
- BJ2032 ZF1 as a two-seater Cabriolet pick-up

The City Cruiser BJ2020 V also appeared in 2000 as a replacement of the Ludi. The BJ2020 VT versions are known as a five-door station wagon as well as BJ2020 VA and BJ2020 VB as four -door convertible. There were two 2.5-liter engines with 100 hp and 106 hp.

The names Zhangqi, Zhanqi, Tieshuang and Jiao Dushi have been handed down for the 2008 model year. Motors are mentioned with 1997 cm^{3}, 2237 cm^{3}, 2771 cm^{3} and 2445 cm^{3} displacement as well as 85 kW (114 hp), 75 kW (101 hp), 68 kW (91 hp) and 68.5 kW (92 hp), whereby a diesel engine is included. The BJ1021 as a pick-up was also available. The vehicles had either 2300 mm or 2500 mm wheelbase. The length was 4050 mm, 4080 mm or 4280 mm, the width 1828 mm or 1830 mm and the height 1840 mm or 1870 mm. The empty weight is specified at 1520 kg to 1720 kg.

The website of the Beijing brand led the model in four series in June 2020:

- Zhanqi with a long wheelbase as a station wagon with four doors,
- Zhanqi CK with a short wheelbase and four doors,
- Gladiator with a short wheelbase, two doors and folding roof and
- classic version with the short wheelbase, Four doors and hood.

=== New BJ212 ===
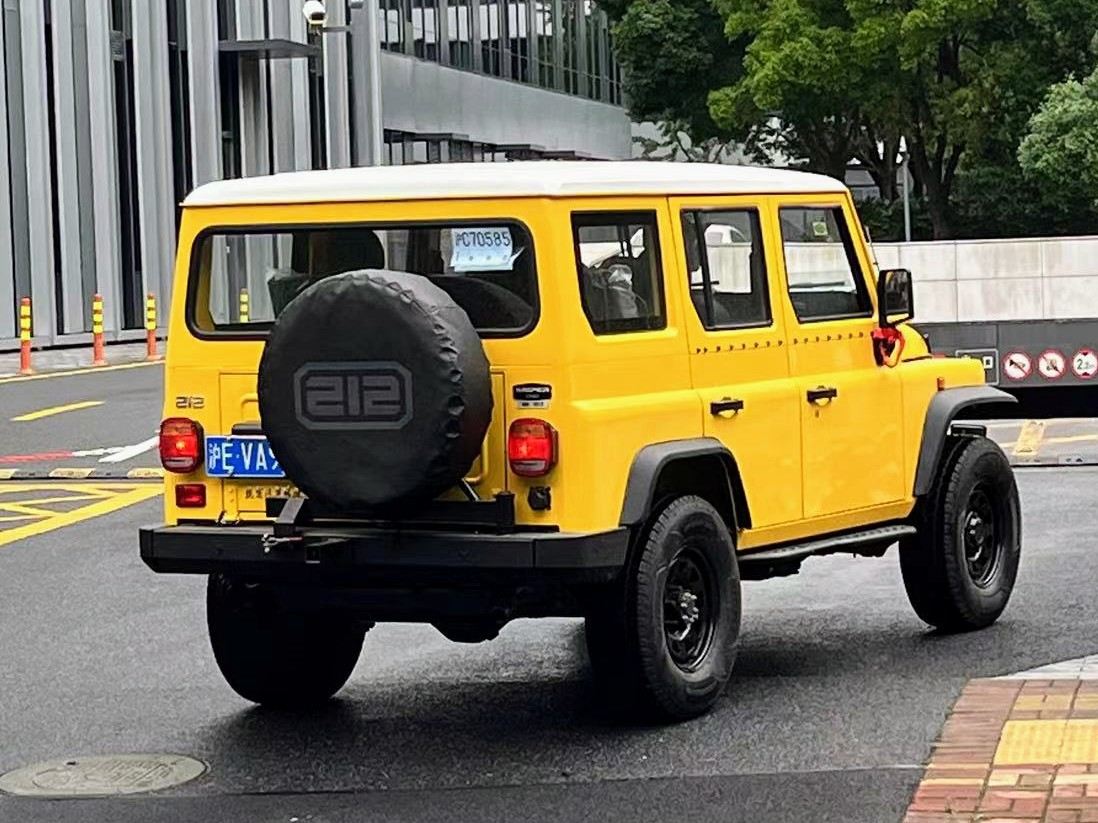
BJ212 Sniper

In 2023 BAW displayed a new BJ212 Sniper (BJ2023CHB2) at the 2023 Beijing Auto Show available in both four door station wagon and cabriolet variants. As of March 2024, the 212 name was relaunched as an independent brand by BAW, and the BAW BJ212 Sniper was renamed the 212 Classic Sniper selling alongside the larger and completely redesigned 212 mT01 SUV.

== Variants ==
=== BJ 2020 ===
- BJ 2020 - (1986–2005) Upgraded with BJ492 engine displacement of 2.45, 12 liters fuel per 100 kilometers
  - BJ2020N: BJ2020N, BJ2020NA, BJ2020NJ (military type), BJ2020NAJ (military type)
  - BJ2020S: BJ2020S, BJ2020SA, BJ2020SAJ (military type), BJ2020SG, BJ2Q20SJ (military type), BJ2020ST
  - BJ2020V "New City Cruiser": BJ2020VA, BJ2020VB, BJ2020VE, BJ2020VT (C498QA engine)
- BJ 2024 S "Jinxuanfeng" (2000–2001) redesigned with rectangular headlights and a Jeep Wrangler-like grille
- BJ 2023/2024 Z "Zhanqi" (2001–present) similar, but less angular and with round headlights copied from Jeep CJ.
- BAW2033 Series "BJ212"（2020–present）Fitted with a turbocharged 1.5 liter gasoline engine or a 2.4 liter gasoline engine manufactured by Hangtian Mitsubishi, which comply with National VI emission standard. The standard Version of the BAW2033 Series includes air conditioning and a restyled interior originated from BAW Yongshi (Gen 1).
- BJ 2032 (1986–2005) four-wheel drive long-wheelbase models, replacing the BJ 222
  - BJ 2032 Z "Zhanqi" (2005–present) as BJ 2032 but redesigned on the Zhanqi lines

=== Military variants ===
- BJ212 HJ-8: HJ-8 ATGM mounted on BJ212 chassis.
- BJ2020 HJ-8: HJ-8 ATGM mounted on BJ2020SAJ chassis. It is used as a light and mobile fire support weapon platform by People's Liberation Army Ground Force.
- BJ2022: Lightly armored vehicle upgrade of BJ2020. It has a lengthened, widened, and strengthened chassis, a new squared-off body, and more powerful engines and better transmissions.

== Other variants ==
BAW not only sold the BJ212 under its own name they also sold it to any other Chinese automaker willing to pay for it. Some of whom only badge engineered and sold it on under their own brand while others made some sheet metal changes and badge engineered it. Other manufacturers acquired the platform and built their own station wagon, sedan, and pickup trucks bodies on them. Still others only installed their own engines under the bonnet. This led to all sorts of variations, made by many different automakers.

=== Great Wall Motors ===
Early Great Wall models includes a BJ212-based crew cab pickup called CC1020S and a BJ212-based station wagon the CC6490.

=== Shuanghuan SHZHJ213 ===
Sales of the BAW produced Jeep Cherokee XJ started to go up slowly in the early 1990s and it therefore aroused interest of China's copycat automakers with BAW then supplying BJ212 platforms to those copycat car makers, and one of whom was Shuanghuan.

=== Other manufacturers ===
Several other companies also made copies the joint venture Cherokee, while BJ, one of the partners of that joint venture, sold them the BJ212 frame for their copy.

== Operators ==
=== Current operators ===
- Bolivia
- Cuba
- Laos
- Libya
- North Korea
- Vietnam

=== Former operators ===
- China

== Gallery ==
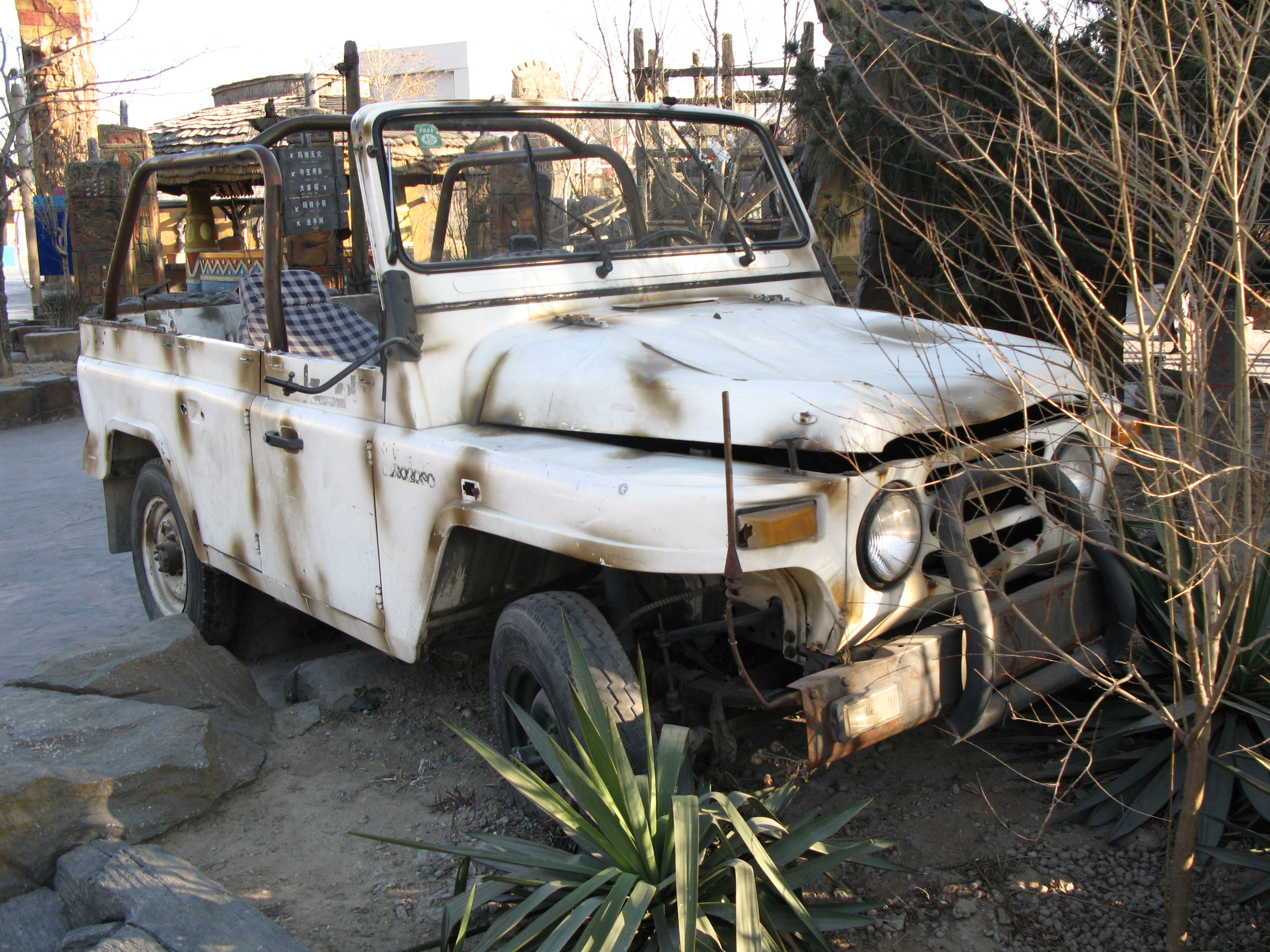
BJ2020 Cabriolet

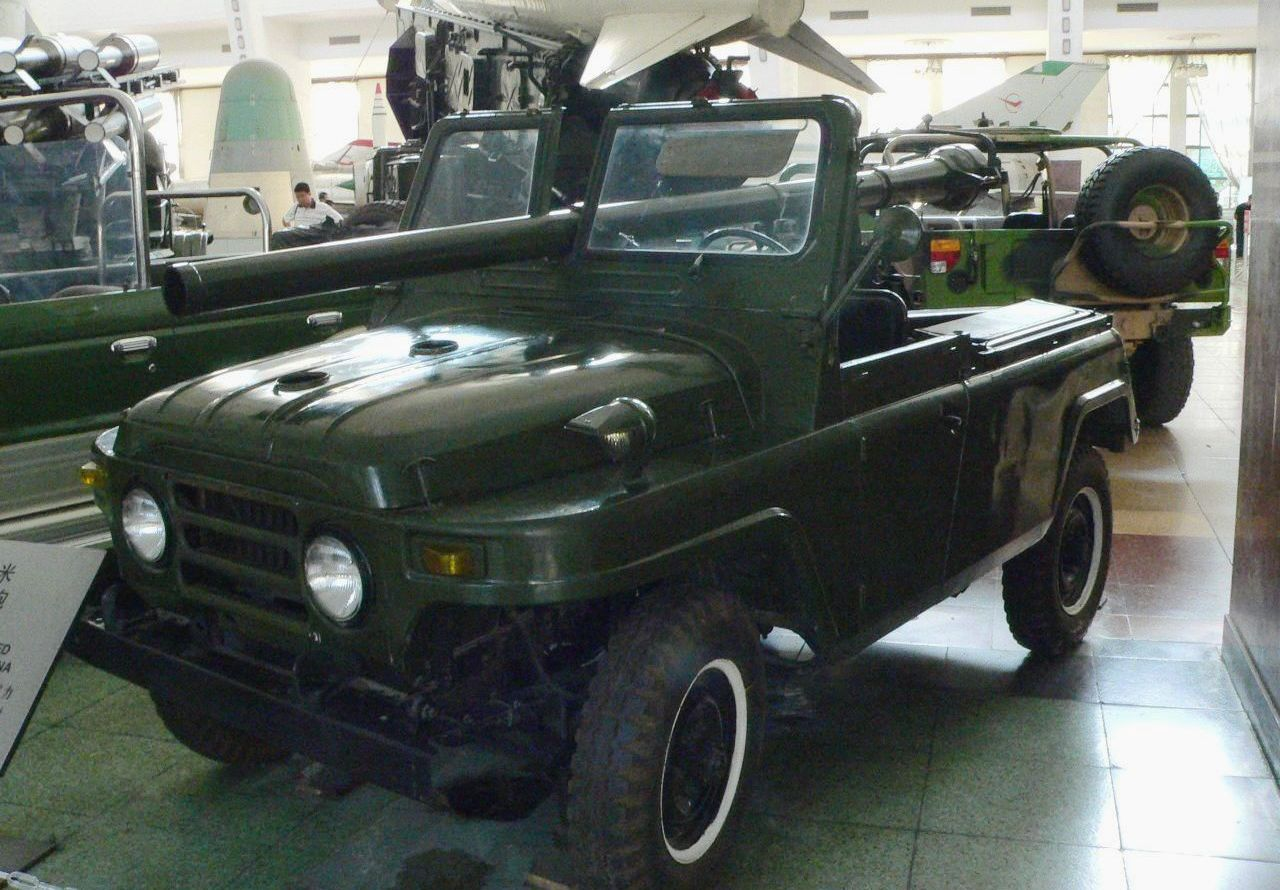
BJ212A with 75mm Type 75 105mm recoilless gun

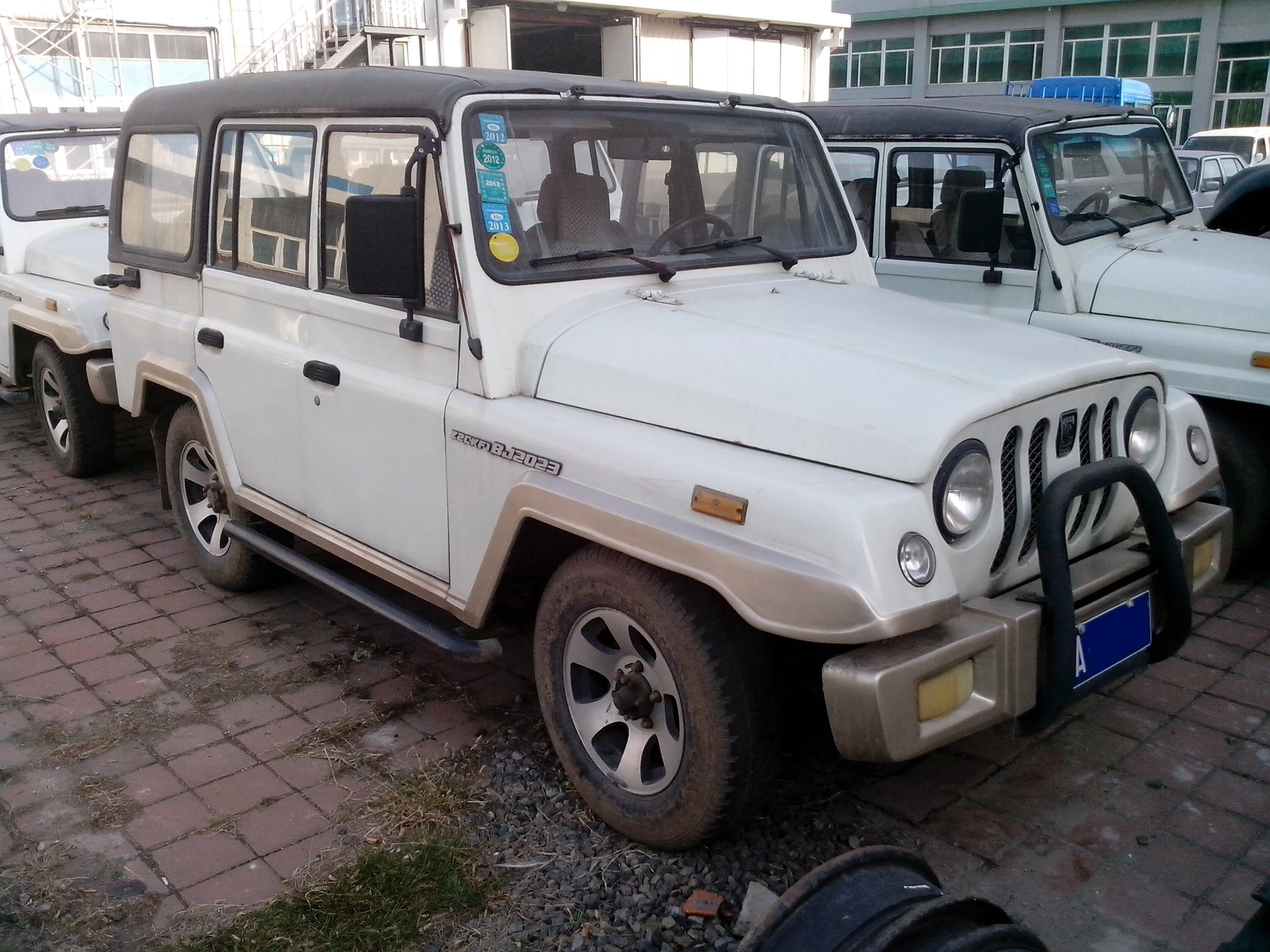
BAW BJ2023 Z2CKF1 "Zhanqi" off-roader

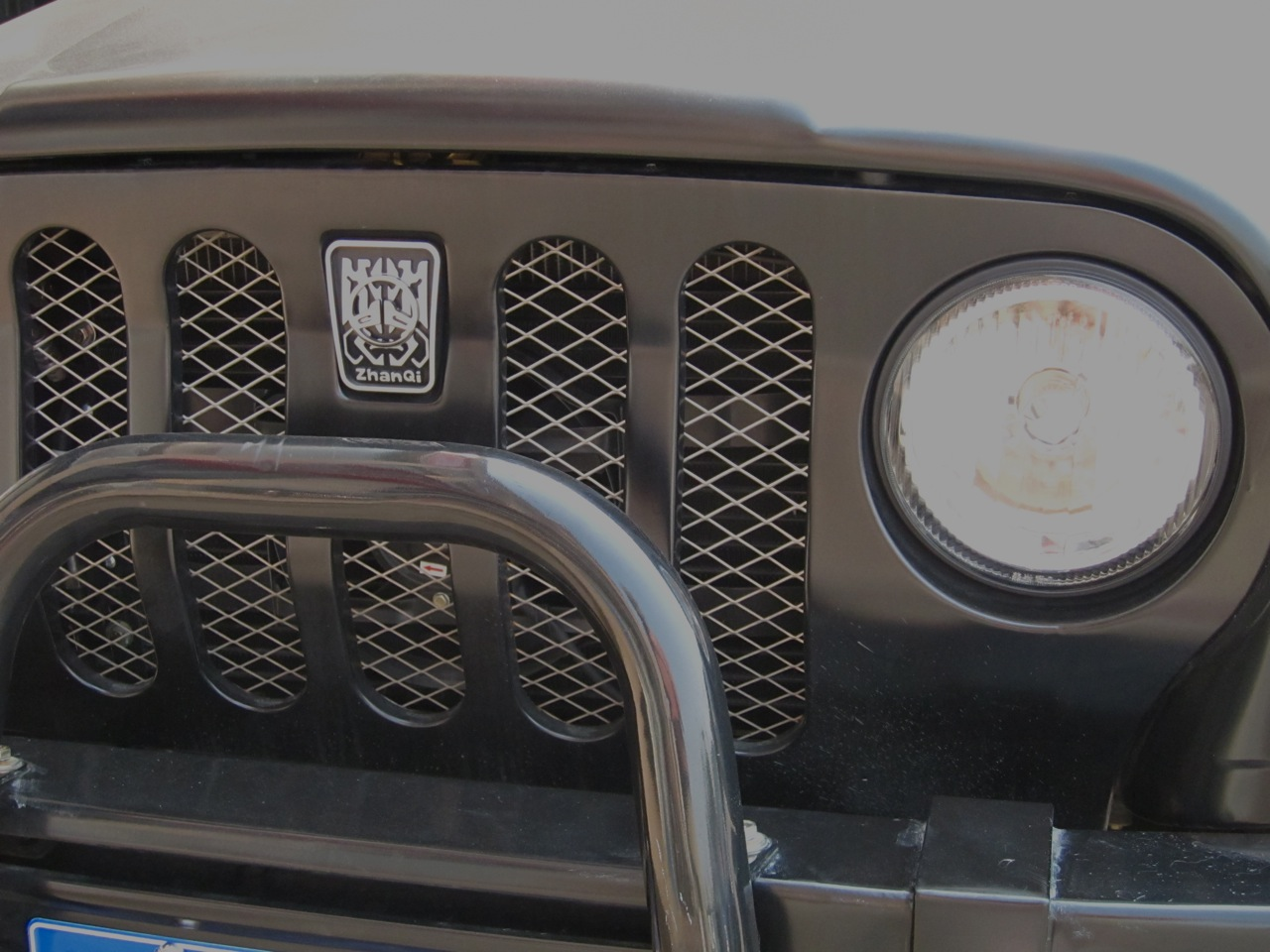
Grill and badge

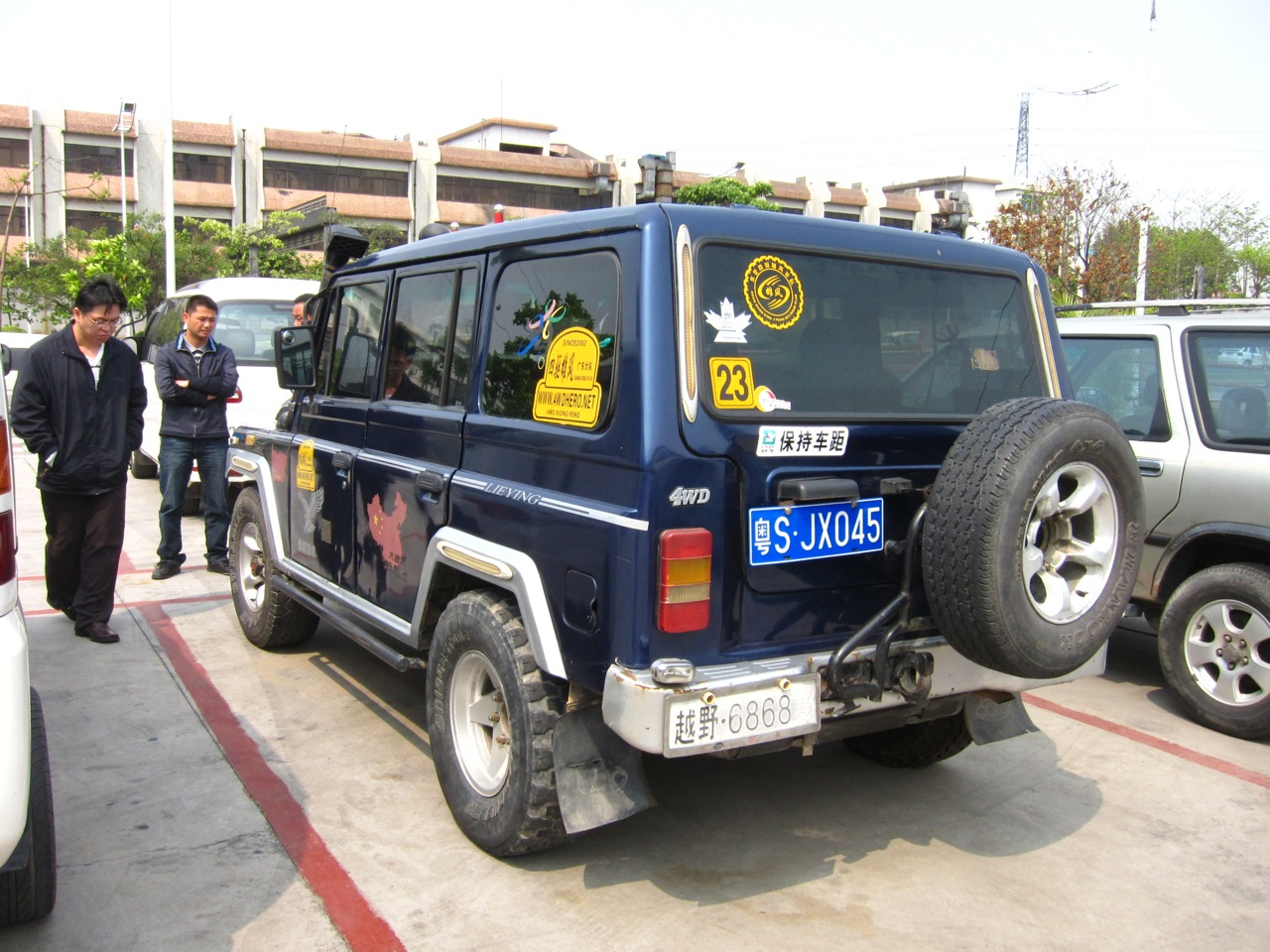
Xinkai HXK2021TPE "Lieying"

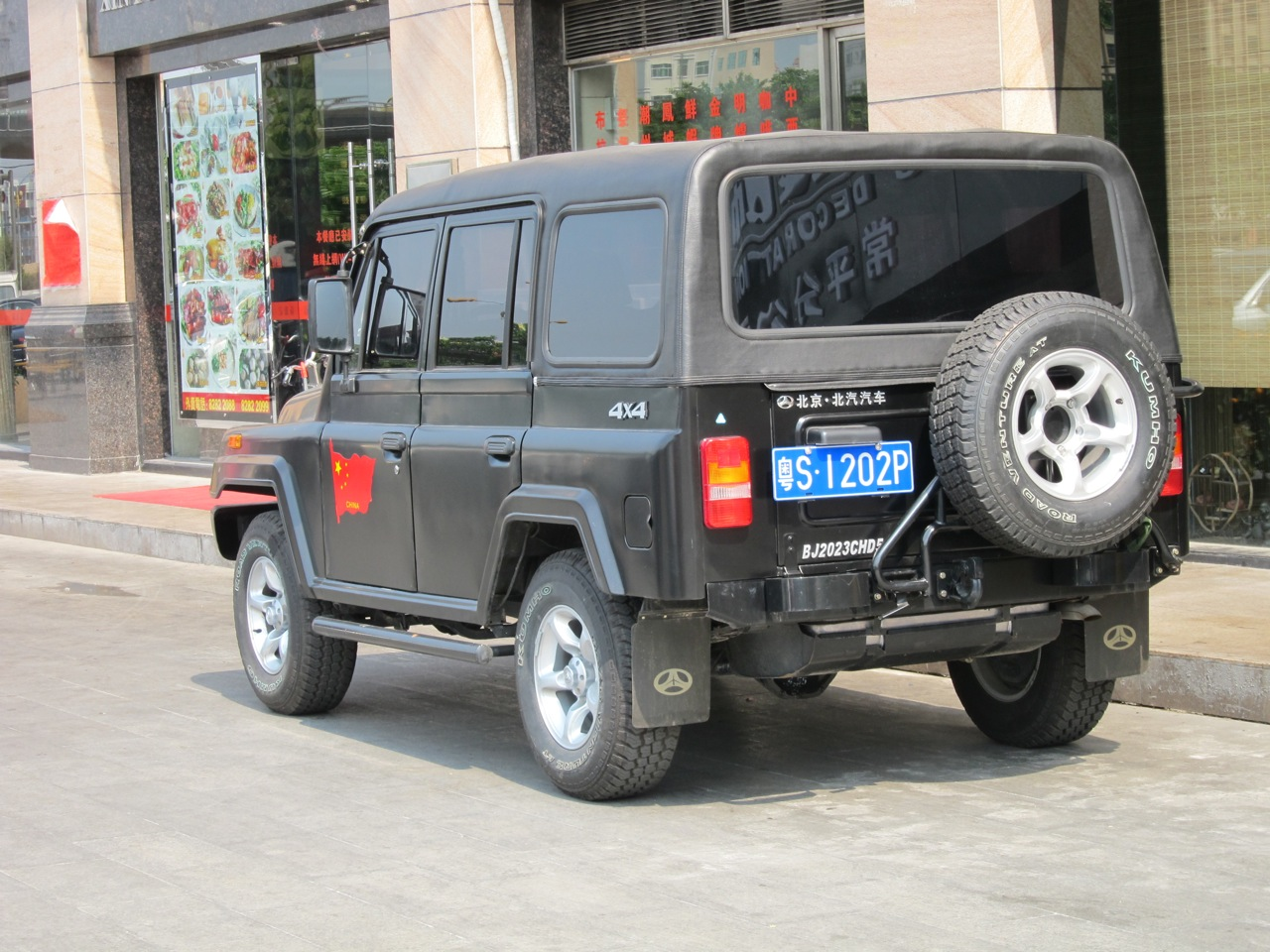
Beijing BJ2023

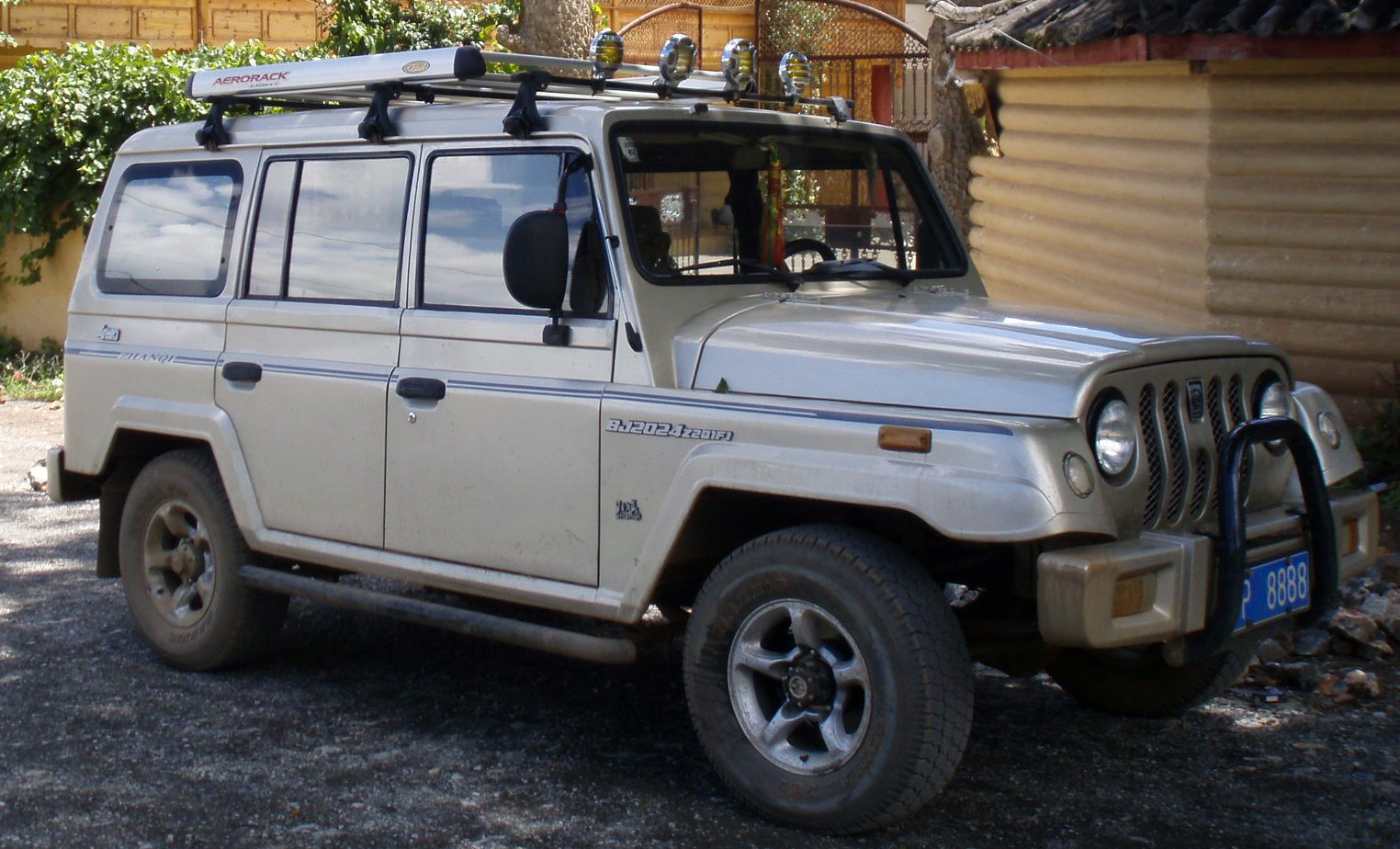
BJ2024 Z2Q1F1 "Zhanqi" Hardtop

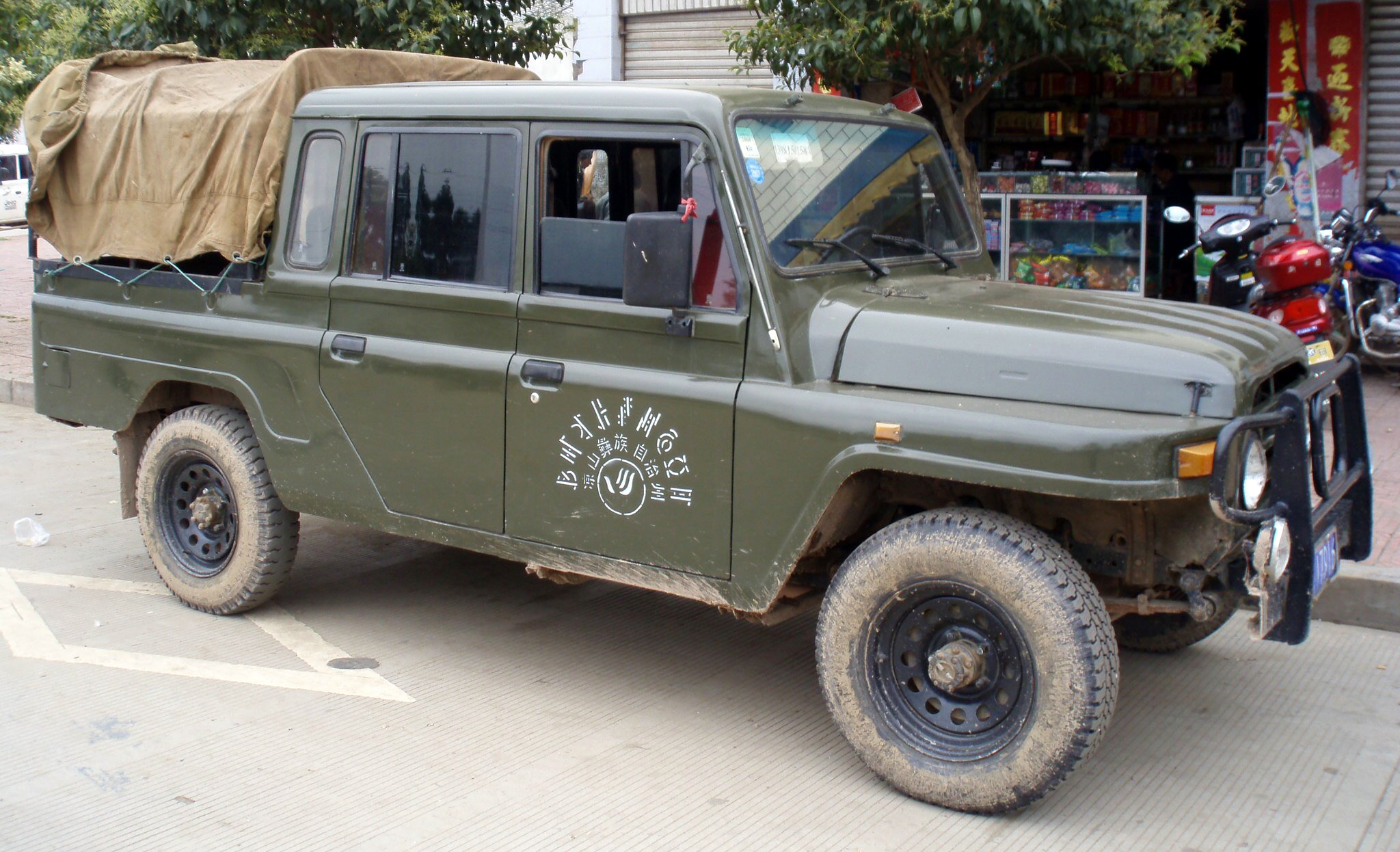
Beijing BJ2032 SAQ pickup which combines the 1965 nose with the post-2000 doors.

== See also ==
- UAZ-469
