= BJ2022 =

Chinese 4x4 utility vehicle

Beijing BJ2022
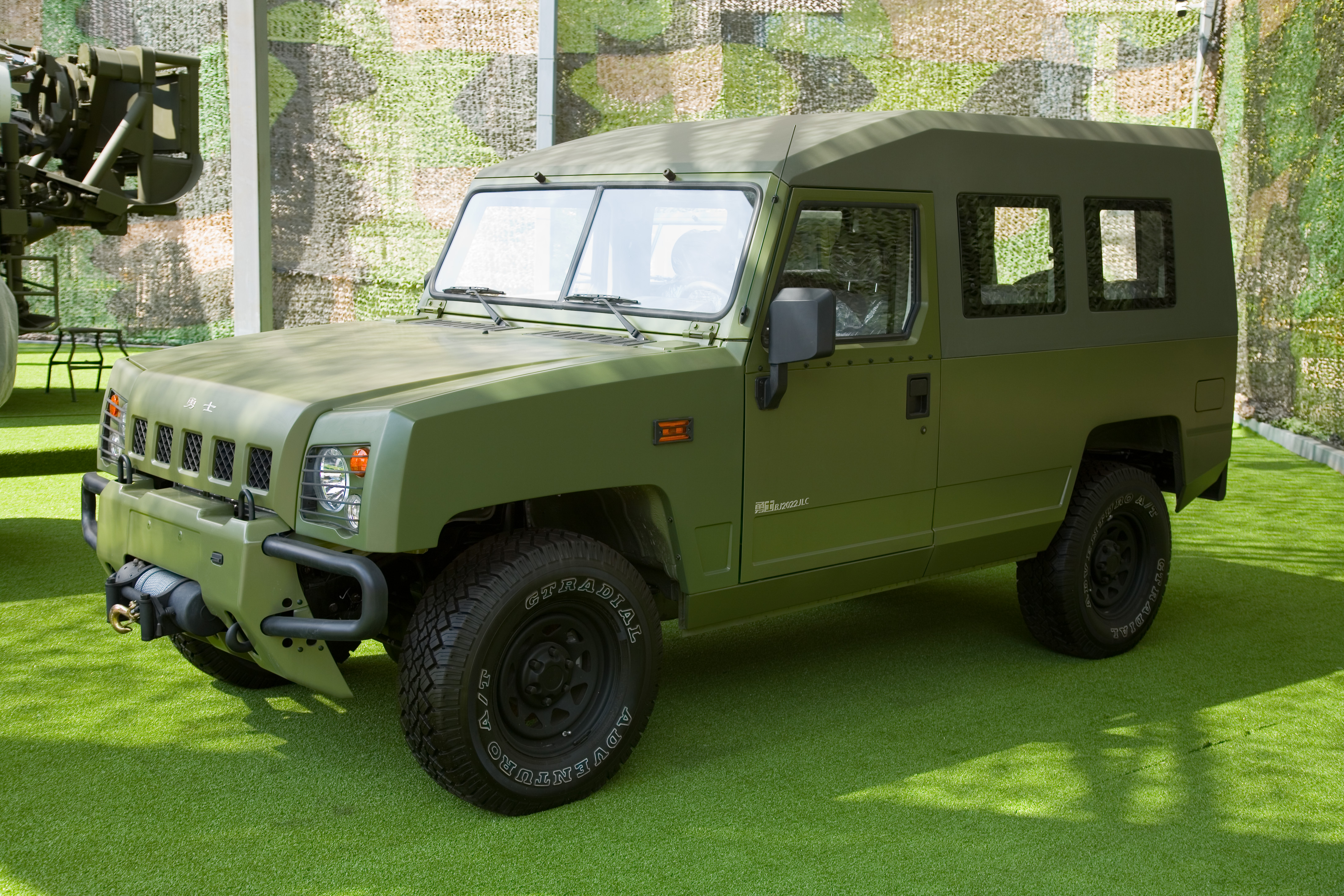
- BJ2022 at the China People's Revolution Military Museum in Beijing during the 2007 Our troops towards the sun exhibition.

Overview
- Also called: Beiqi Zhanshen
- Production: 2005–present

Body and chassis
- Class: SUV; Pickup truck
- Layout: Front engine, four-wheel drive

Powertrain
- Engine: 2.0 L 4G63S4T I4 (turbo petrol) (2018 Yongshi pickup); 2.2 L 4G22C I4 (petrol) (2018 Yongshi pickup); 2.7 L G4BA I4 (petrol) (2008, 2013 Yongshi); 3.0 L I6 (petrol); 2.5 L JE4D25E/JE4D25Q5A I4 (turbo diesel) (2014, 2017, 2018 Yongshi); 2.8 L JE493ZLQ5D I4 (turbo diesel) (2018 Yongshi pickup); 3.0 L CYQD29Ti I4 (turbo diesel) (2008 Yongshi); 3152 cc QD32Ti L I4 (turbo diesel) (BJ2022JC)
- Transmission: 6 speed manual 5 speed manual

Dimensions
- Wheelbase: 2,600 mm (102 in) (basic variant); 2,800 mm (110 in) (long body variant)
- Length: 4,080 mm (161 in)
- Width: 1,840 mm (72 in)
- Height: 1,870 mm (74 in)

The Beijing BJ2022 is a 1/2 or 3/4 ton 4×4 utility vehicle developed by Beijing Automobile Works and used by the PLA. The BJ2022 has been in production since 2005.

It's also referred as "Yongshi" (勇士) or Brave Warrior. It was jointly developed by Beijing Auto Works and Chrysler.

== History ==
The vehicle entered PLA service in August 2007.

== Design and development ==
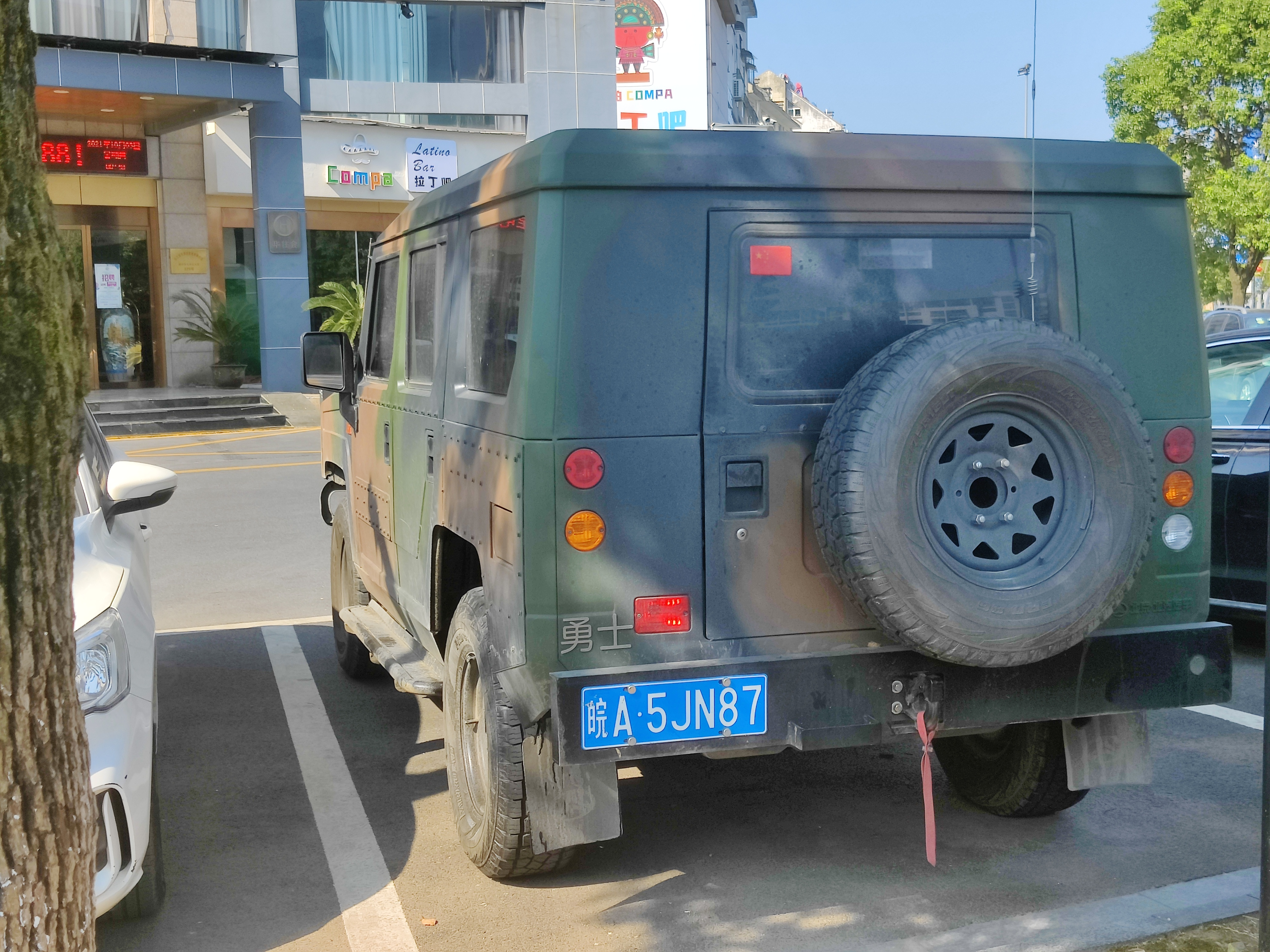
Beijing BJ2022 rear

Initial bid for a successor vehicle to the BJ2020S were made in 1999. A concept vehicle was revealed in 2002. A couple of prototypes were made specially for the Chinese army. After finalizing the design, production of the BJ2022 began in 2005. Deliveries to the Chinese Army began in 2007. In 2009 due to financial troubles in the US the Chrysler left the joint venture and granted Beijing Auto Works the rights to continue production of this vehicle under its own name. Currently the BJ2022 is being produced in large numbers. It is the most widely used 4x4 vehicle in the Chinese army. It is also used by some paramilitary and law enforcement units.

The BJ2022 is based on a Jeep Cherokee, but is longer and wider. The new vehicle is larger and more spacious than the older BJ2020. It is used as a troop and cargo transport, command vehicle or reconnaissance vehicle.

A baseline BJ2022 has a fully enclosed 4-door body. This vehicle has a 500 kg (1,100 lb) payload capacity. It carries five soldiers, including the driver. Windscreen can be folded over the bonnet and top and side windows removed in order to reduce vehicle height. It has a trailer hitch and can tow light trailers or artillery pieces with a maximum weight of 500 kg (1,100 lb).

Other body types are also available. There are 4-door vehicles with open top, 2-door vehicles with hard top, 2-door pickup, and possibly some other. Some of them can carry up to 8 men, including the driver. These vehicles have 500 kg (1,100 lb) or 750 kg (1,650 lb) capacity, depending on the version. Payload capacity corresponds with the towed load. A lightly armored version has also been developed.

This vehicle is powered by a 3.0-liter turbocharged diesel engine, sourced from Nissan. It developed 140 hp. Civil versions are also available with a 2.7-liter petrol engine, also sourced by Nissan. Vehicle is fitted with a front-mounted self-recovery winch. It's also equipped with either GPS or GLONASS.

== Operators ==
- China: People's Liberation Army.
- Dominican Republic:The government of the Dominican Republic received 8 BJ2022 vehicles and 140 motorcycles as a donation from the People's Republic of China.

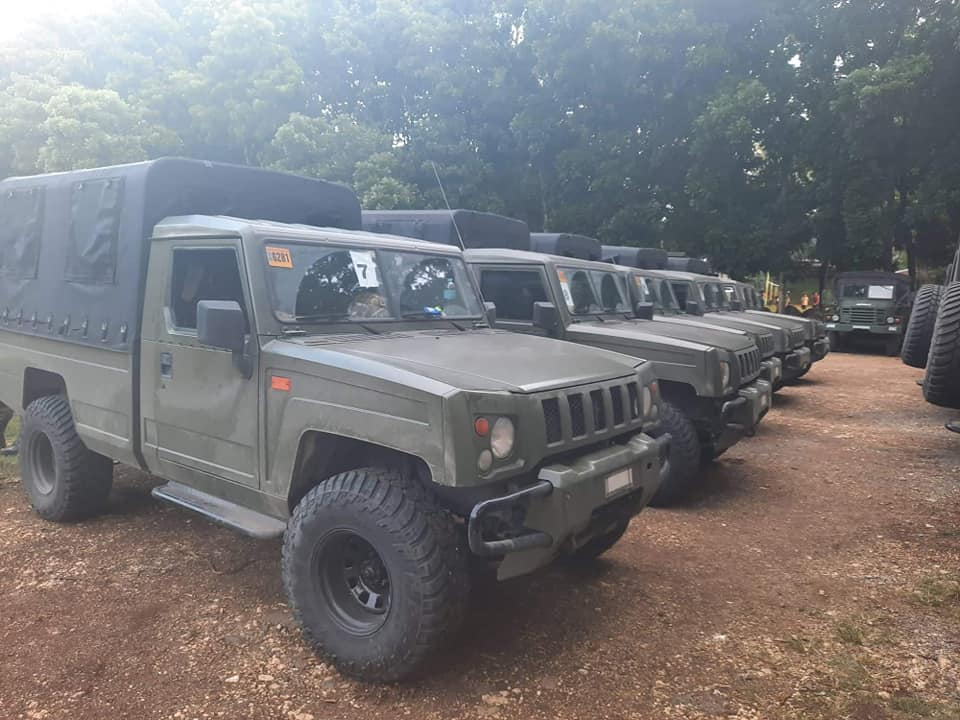
Philippine Army BJ2034 Light Troop Carrier.

- Philippines: Philippine Army bought through 49 BAW BJ2022s in the long wheelbase, pickup truck version.
- Sri Lanka: Part of the mobile Command and Communication System of the Sri Lankan Army.
- Ba'athist Syria: BJ2022s reported to be spotted with Syrian troops.

== Gallery ==
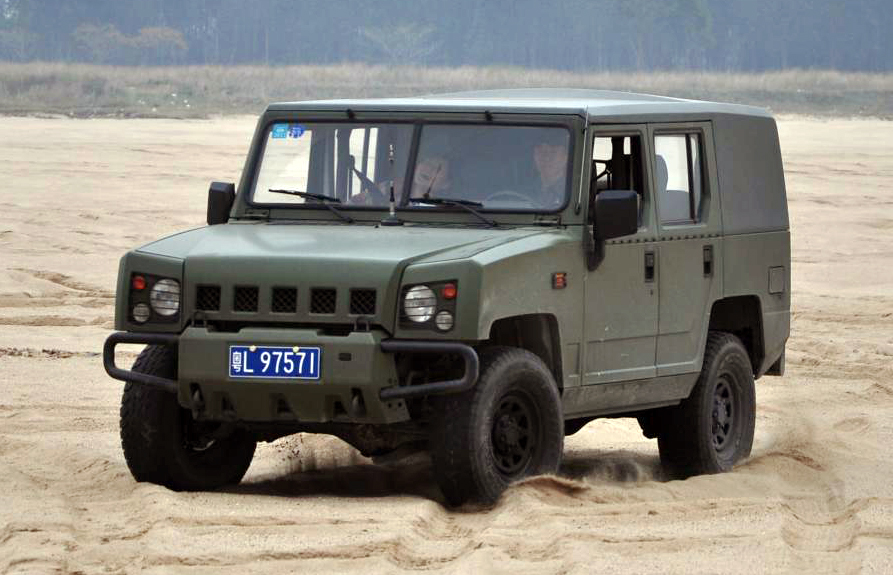
Civilian Beijing BJ2022LC Warrior in 2011.

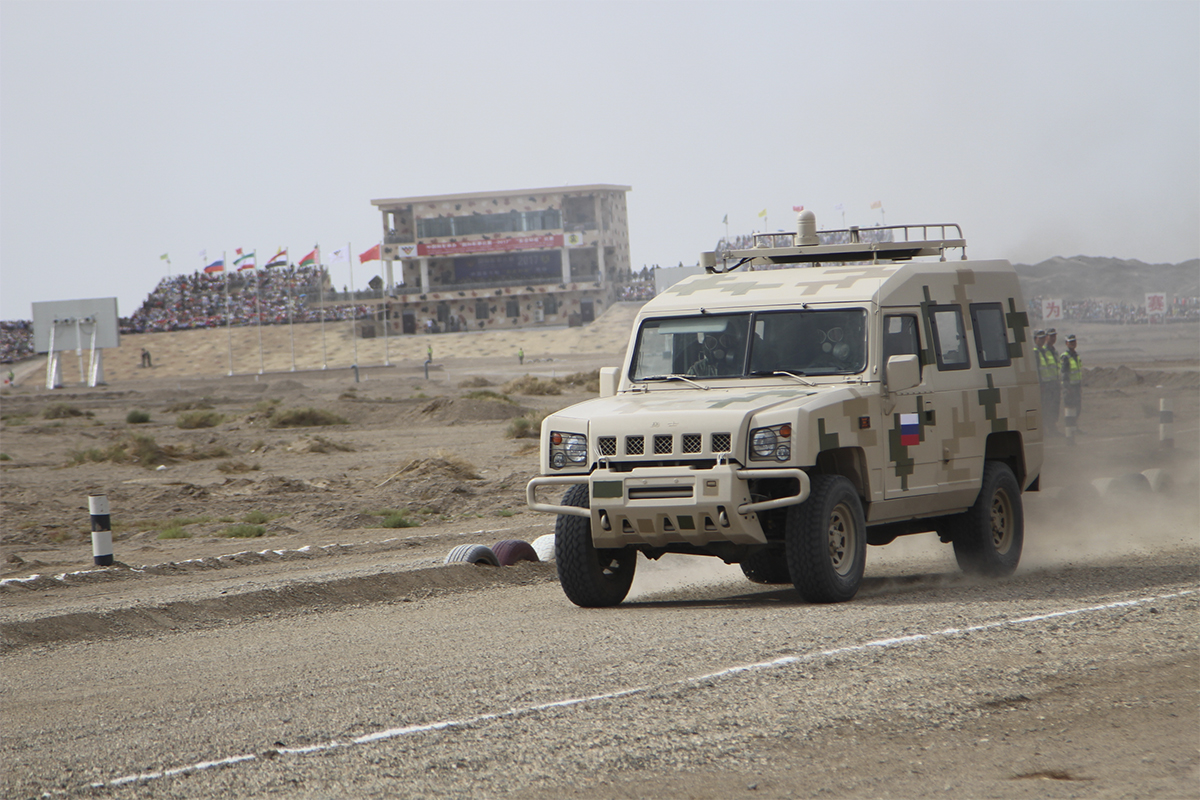
BJ2022 used by Russian Ground Forces at the Secure Environment of International Army Games in 2017.

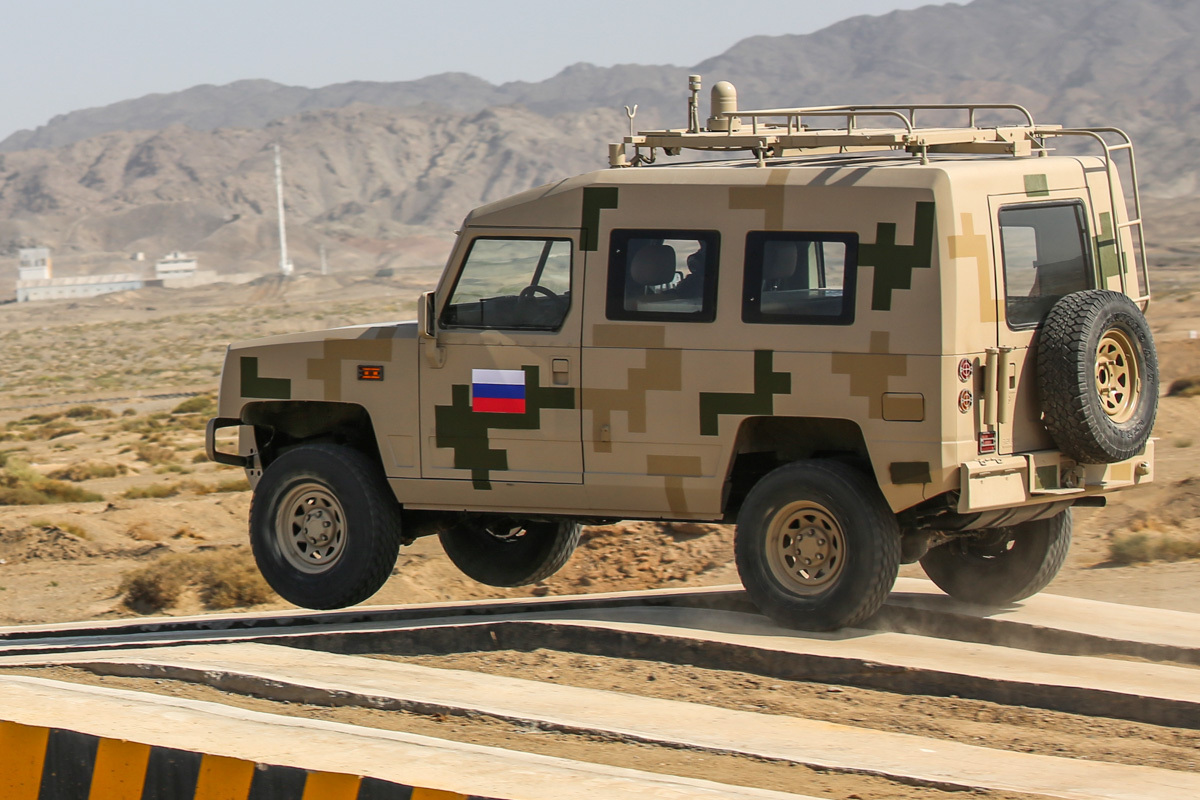
Rear-left side of BJ2022.

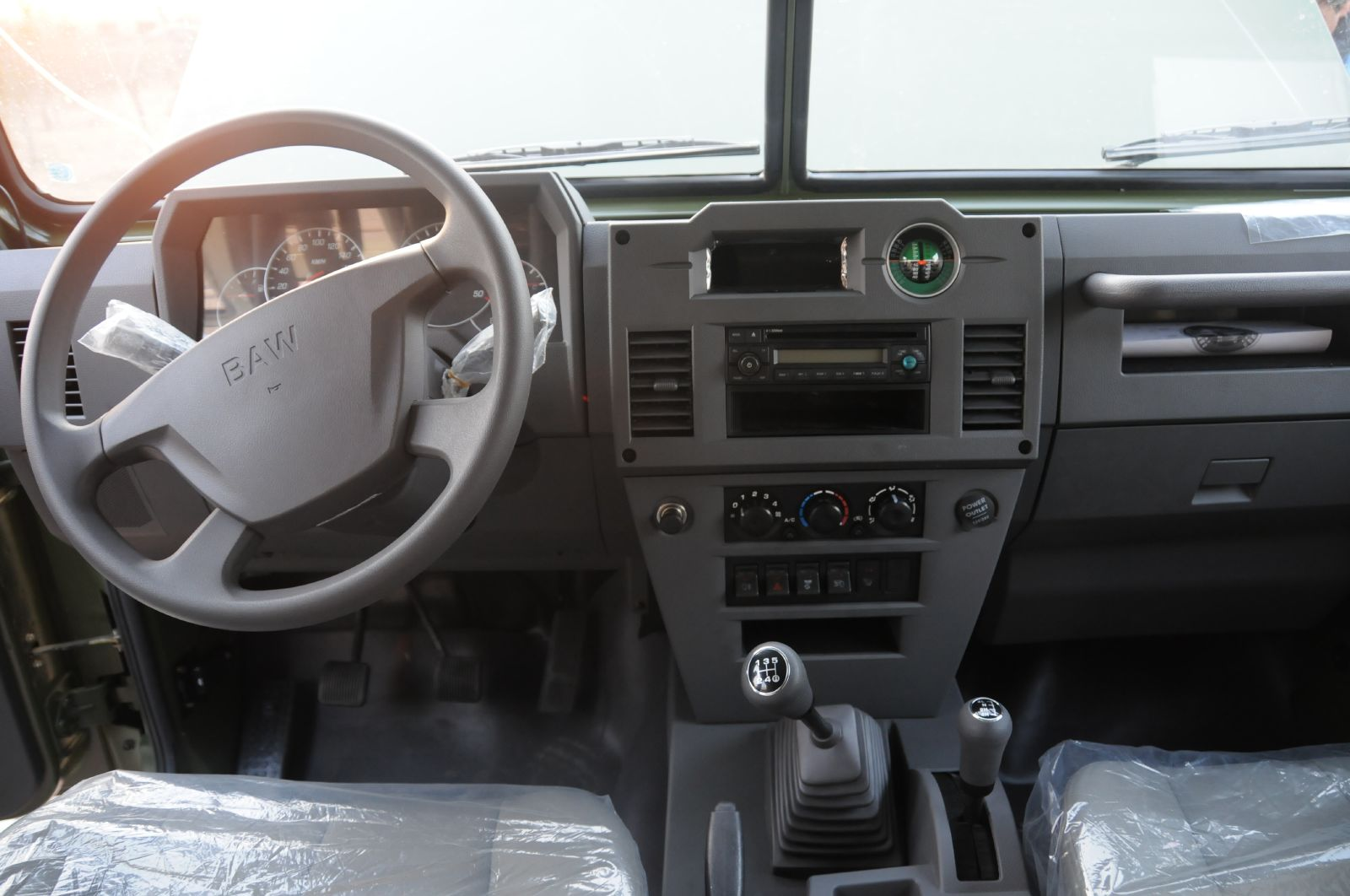
Interior of the BAW BJ2022JLC.

== See also ==
- BJ212/BJ2020
