= Dongfeng eπ 008 =

Mid-size crossover SUV

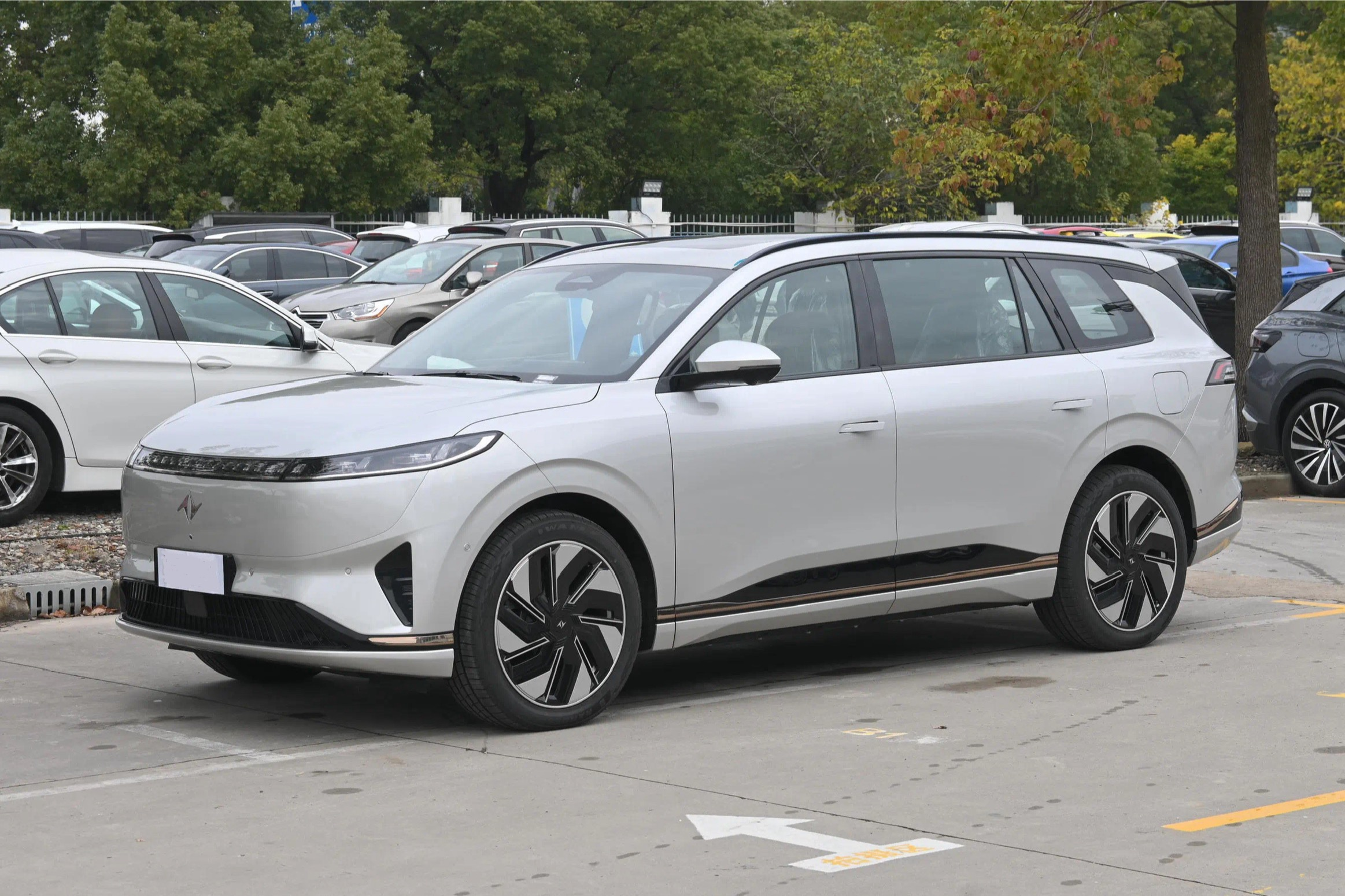

Overview
- Manufacturer: Dongfeng Motor Corporation
- Also called: Dongfeng Ace 008; Dongfeng 008 (export); Dongfeng eπ M8 (2026); Aeolus L9 (2026)
- Production: 2024–present
- Assembly: China: Wuhan

Body and chassis
- Class: Mid-size crossover SUV
- Body style: 5-door SUV
- Layout: Front-engine, rear-motor, rear-wheel drive (EREV); Rear-motor, rear-wheel-drive; Dual-motor, all-wheel-drive
- Related: Dongfeng eπ 007

Powertrain
- Engine: Petrol range extender: 1.5 L DFMC15TE3 turbo I4; 1.5 L DFMC15TPE turbo I4
- Electric motor: Permanent magnet synchronous
- Power output: 200–230 kW (270–310 hp; 270–310 PS)
- Hybrid drivetrain: Series range-extender (EREV)
- Battery: 34.3 kWh LFP CALB; 45.7 kWh LFP Sunwoda; 77.4 kWh LFP CATL; 82.3 kWh LFP Sunwoda
- Range: 1,200 km (746 mi) (EREV)
- Electric range: 600–636 km (373–395 mi) (EV, CLTC); 150–220 km (93–137 mi) (EREV, WLTP); 202–300 km (126–186 mi) (EREV, CLTC)

Dimensions
- Wheelbase: 3,025 mm (119.1 in)
- Length: 5,002 mm (196.9 in) (008); 5,020 mm (197.6 in) (M8)
- Width: 1,972 mm (77.6 in) (008); 1,975 mm (77.8 in) (M8)
- Height: 1,732 mm (68.2 in)
- Curb weight: 2,189–2,228 kg (4,826–4,912 lb)

The Dongfeng eπ 008 (pronounced 'e pi'; also known as Yipai 008, Dongfeng Ace 008 or simply Dongfeng 008), is a battery electric and plug-in hybrid mid-size crossover SUV produced by Chinese automobile manufacturer Dongfeng Motor Corporation under the Dongfeng eπ (东风奕派) sub-brand. It is the second product of the eπ sub-brand, and was launched in 2024.

== Overview ==
In the fall of 2023, Dongfeng launched the eπ sub-brand, which is dedicated to the production of electric vehicles. The first model was the Dongfeng eπ 007. Later, the eπ 008 model was introduced.

The five-meter-long vehicle was presented in April 2024 at the Beijing Auto Show. Two months later, it went on sale in the Chinese market as a six-seater. A five-seater version followed in October 2024. The drag coefficient of the car is given as 0.268.

Slim headlights, matrix taillights and hidden door handles integrated with the lighting section are the hallmarks of the exterior design. The model can be equipped with 20- or 21-inch wheels. The interior also features a large screen and a digital instrument cluster in the center, as well as a wireless charging system for smartphones.

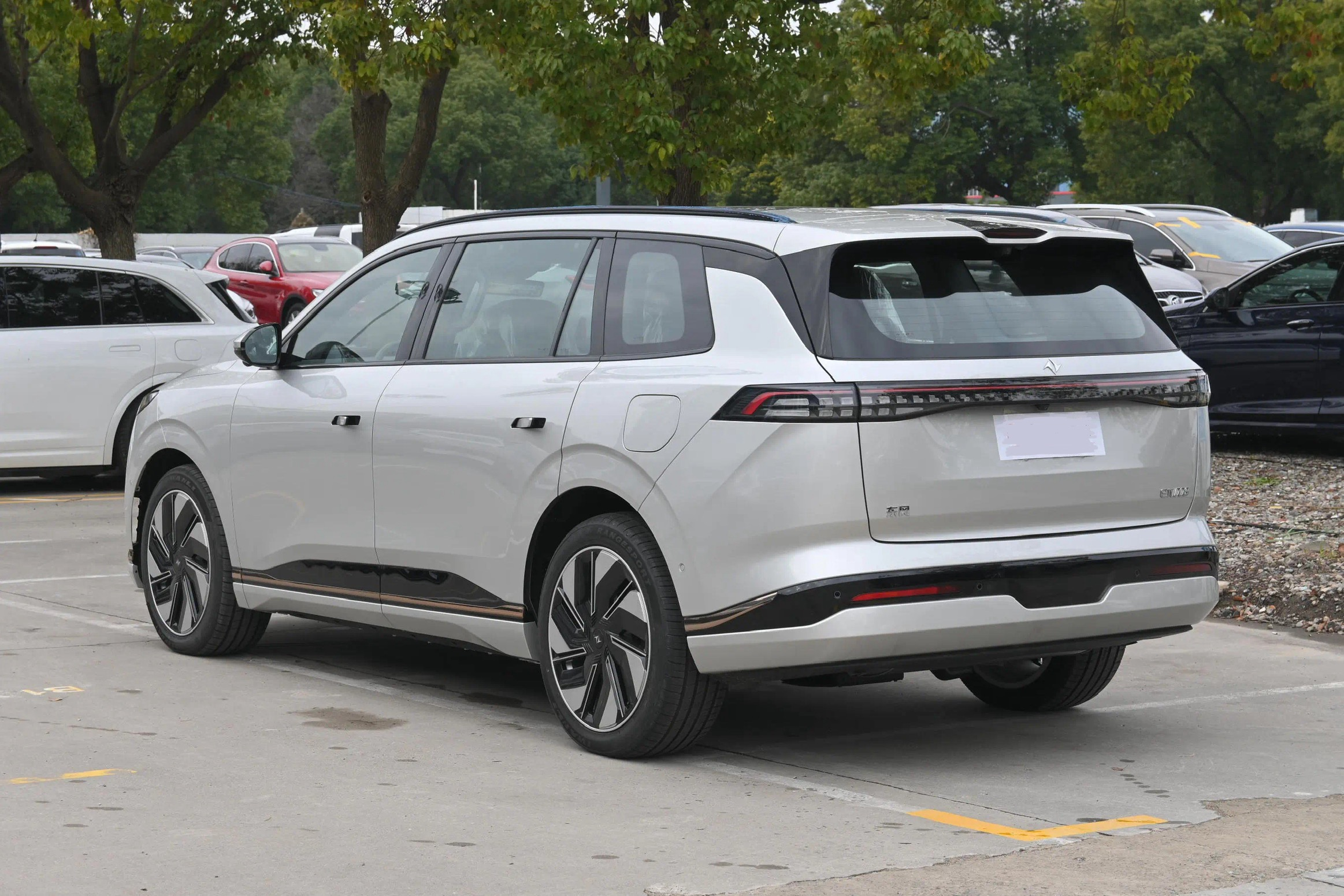
Rear view

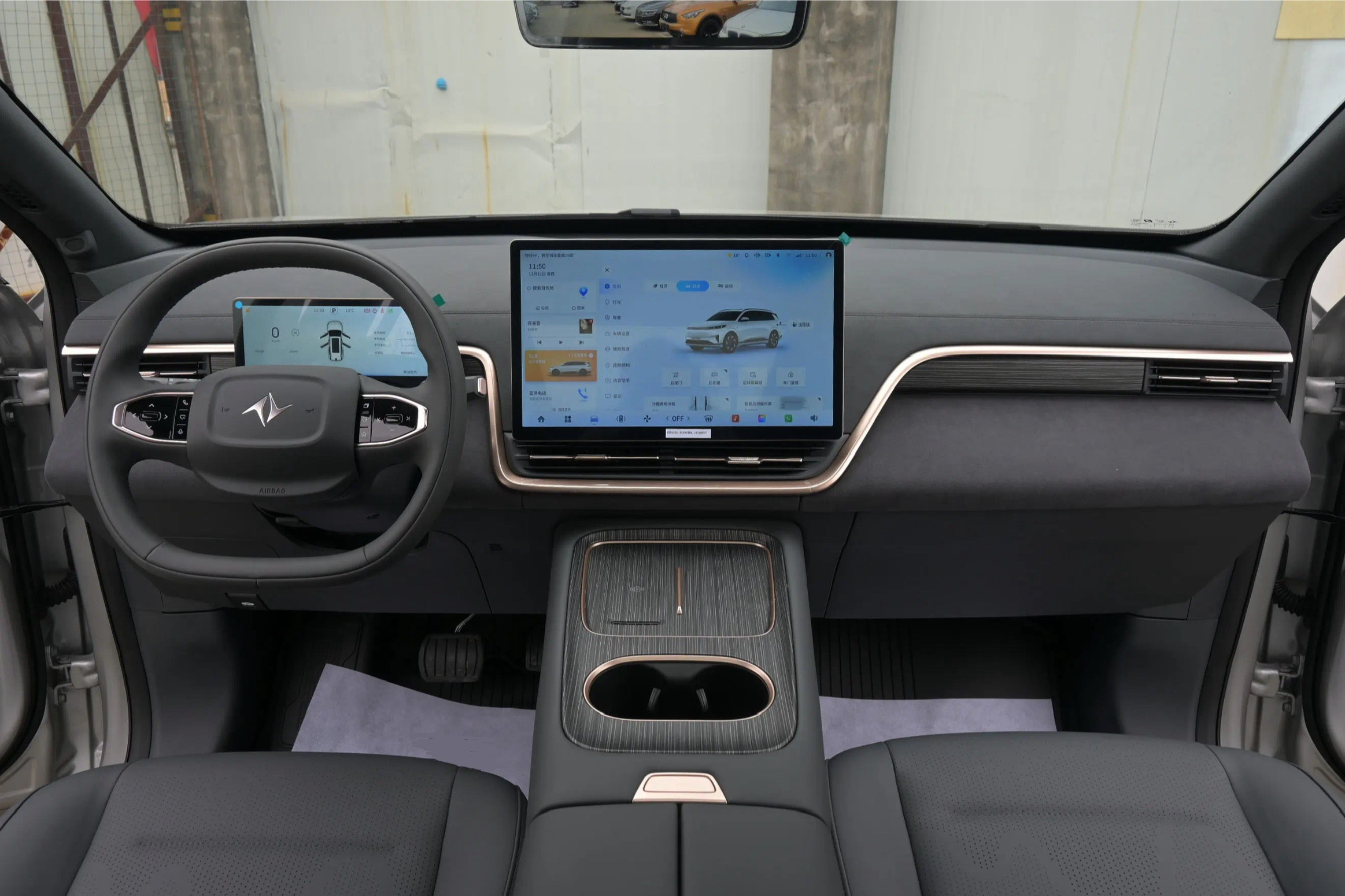
Interior

== Dongfeng eπ M8 ==
In May 2026, an updated variant of the 008, named to eπ M8, was released and is to feature Huawei's Qiankun ADS 5 Pro ADAS system and features teal assisted driving indicator lights.

Dongfeng says the M8's chassis consists of 70.8% high-strength steel and 19.1% hot-formed steel, including reinforcements in critical areas with 1500 M·Pa ultra-high strength steel. It uses MacPherson strut front and aluminium-alloy H-arm five-link independent rear suspension geometries with adaptive dampers. It has a turning radius of 5.6 metres (18.4 ft).

The interior features the Huawei smart cockpit system, including a 10.25-inch digital instrument panel supplemented by a 50-inch augmented-reality heads-up display, 16.1-inch 3K-resolution central infotainment touchscreen, and an optional 17.3-inch 3K-resolution ceiling-mounted rear passenger entertainment display, running Huawei's HarmonyOS. It features an 8.8-litre (0.31 cu ft) refrigerator-heater compartment in the center console with a temperature range of −6–50 °C (21–122 °F), a panoramic sunroof, and a 21-speaker 7.1.4 surround sound system.

It features Huawei's Qiankun ADS 5 Pro ADAS system, which has a sensor suite consisting of one Limera in-cabin LiDAR, 3 4D mmWave radars, 11 cameras, and 12 ultrasonic sensors, and is capable of supervised autonomous driving in highway and urban conditions.

On 3 November 2026, variants of the M8 equipped with Dongfeng's self-developed Tianyuan cockpit and ADAS system were launched, and will be sold alongside variants with the Huawei's cockpit and ADAS system. The interior now has two 15.6-inch 2.5K-resolution displays serving as the central infotainment touchscreen and rear passenger entertainment display, and is powered by a Qualcomm Snapdragon 8295P chip. The Tianyuan T200 ADAS system uses a sensor suite consisting of one Hesai roof-mounted LiDAR, one mmWave radar, 11 cameras and 12 ultrasonic sensors, and is powered by a Horizon Robotics J6M chip capable of 128 TOPS and is capable of supervised autonomous driving in highway and urban conditions.

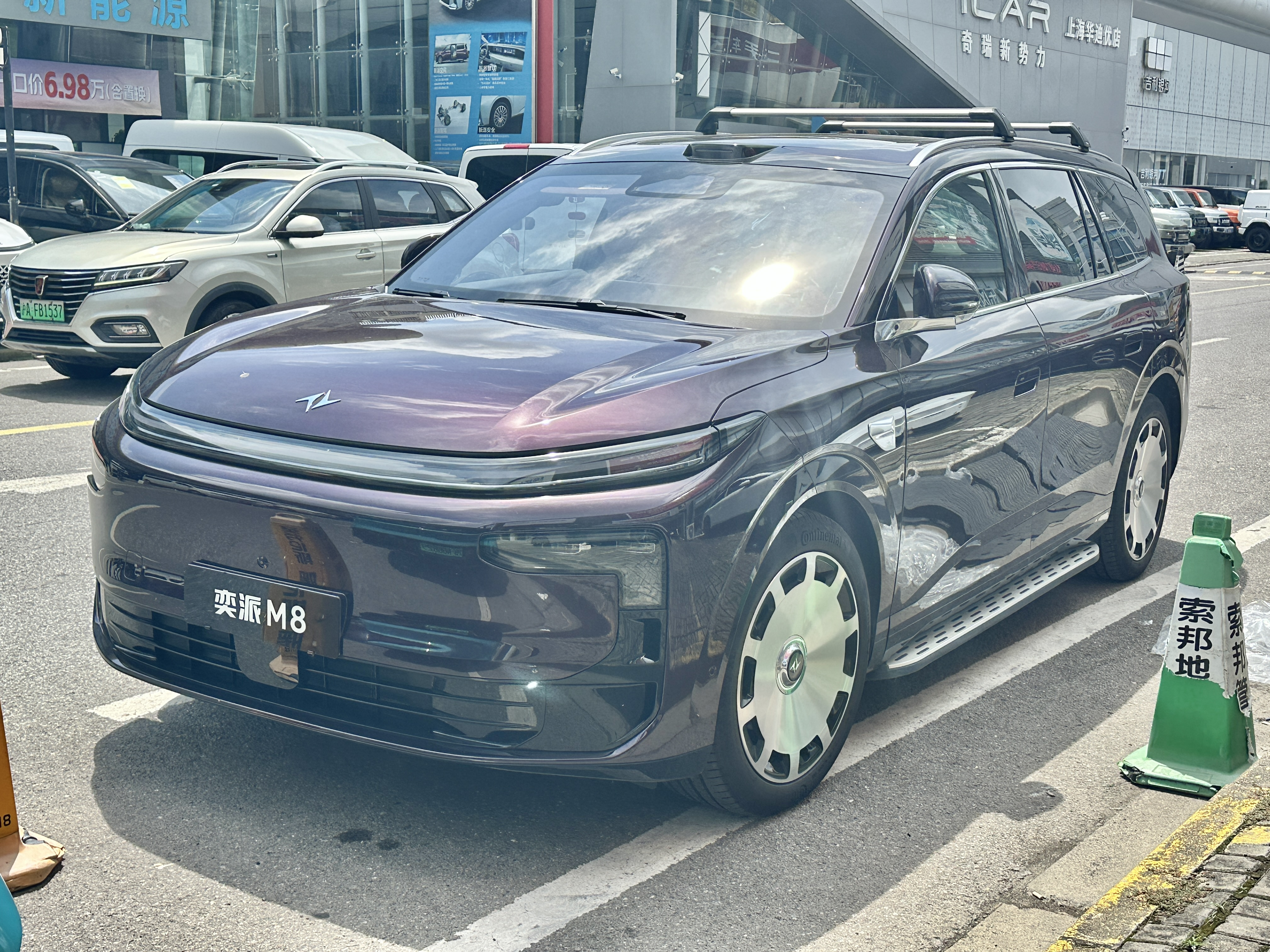
Dongfeng eπ M8

Rear view

== Powertrain ==
The eπ 008 is available with either range extender or battery electric powertrains. Both are equipped with a permanent magnet synchronous motor driving the rear wheels outputting 268 hp (200 kW; 272 PS) and 340 N⋅m (251 lb⋅ft) of torque, providing a 0–100 km/h (62 mph) acceleration time of 9 seconds and a top speed of 180 km/h (112 mph).

The range extender variants use a 1.5-liter direct-injection turbocharged inline-4 petrol engine outputting 141 hp (105 kW; 143 PS) (145 hp (108 kW; 147 PS) gross) at 4,500 rpm and 210 N⋅m (155 lb⋅ft) of torque at 2,000–4,500 rpm, and has a peak thermal efficiency of 45.18%. It is equipped with a 34.3 kWh LFP battery pack supplied by CALB, which provides 210 kilometres (130 mi) of WLTP electric range and can charge 30–80% in 26 minutes. In an update in 2025 for the 2026 model year, WLTP electric range decreases to 202 kilometres (126 mi) but charging speed increases to 30–80% in 15 minutes at a peak rate of 91 kW.

The electric variant is equipped with a 82.3 kWh LFP battery pack supplied by Sunwoda which provides 636 kilometres (395 mi) of CLTC range and can recharge 30–80% in 28 minutes with a peak rate of 108 kW. For the 2026 model year, range ratings decrease to 620 kilometres (385 mi), and variants equipped with the higher tier ADAS system have a 610 kilometres (379 mi) CLTC rating.

The eπ M8 released in 2026 features a thoroughly refreshed range extender and battery electric powertrains. Both are capable of a 0–100 km/h (62 mph) acceleration time of 9 seconds and a top speed of 180 km/h (112 mph).

The range extender variant use a 1.5-liter port-injected turbocharged inline-4 petrol engine outputting 121 hp (90 kW; 123 PS) (127 hp (95 kW; 129 PS) gross) at 5,200 rpm and 205 N⋅m (151 lb⋅ft) of torque at 3,500 rpm. It is equipped with a larger 45.66 kWh LFP battery pack supplied by Sunwoda, which provides 220 kilometres (137 mi) of WLTP electric range and can charge 30–80% in 14.3 minutes at a peak rate of 182 kW. It is equipped with a rear motor outputting 288 hp (215 kW; 292 PS) and 380 N⋅m (280 lb⋅ft) of torque.

The electric variant is equipped with a smaller 77.4 kWh LFP battery pack supplied by CATL which provides 600 kilometres (373 mi) of CLTC range and can recharge 30–80% in 15.5 minutes with a peak rate of 310 kW and peak current of 480amps. It is equipped with a rear motor outputting 309 hp (230 kW; 313 PS) and 395 N⋅m (291 lb⋅ft) of torque.

Specifications
Model year	Battery		Engine	Motor	Power	Torque	Electric range		DC charging		Kerb weight
Model year	Type	Weight	Engine	Rear	Power	Torque	WLTP	CLTC	Peak	30–80%	Kerb weight
eπ 008
2024–2025 EREV	34.32 kWh LFP CALB	280 kg (617 lb)	1.5 L DFMC15TE3 I4 turbo; 141 hp (105 kW; 143 PS) at 4,500 rpm	200 kW TZ200XS3ZX PMSM	268 hp (200 kW; 272 PS)	340 N⋅m (251 lb⋅ft)	150 km (93 mi)	210 km (130 mi)	—	26 min	2,189 kg (4,826 lb)
2026 EREV	34.32 kWh LFP CALB	280 kg (617 lb)	1.5 L DFMC15TE3 I4 turbo; 141 hp (105 kW; 143 PS) at 4,500 rpm	200 kW TZ200XS3ZX PMSM	268 hp (200 kW; 272 PS)	340 N⋅m (251 lb⋅ft)	150 km (93 mi)	202 km (126 mi)	91 kW	15 min	2,189 kg (4,826 lb)
2024–2025 EV	82.28 kWh LFP Sunwoda	591 kg (1,303 lb)	—	200 kW TZ200XS3ZX PMSM	268 hp (200 kW; 272 PS)	340 N⋅m (251 lb⋅ft)	—	636 km (395 mi)	108 kW	28 min	2,228 kg (4,912 lb)
2026 EV	82.28 kWh LFP Sunwoda	591 kg (1,303 lb)	—	200 kW TZ200XS3ZX PMSM	268 hp (200 kW; 272 PS)	340 N⋅m (251 lb⋅ft)	—	610–620 km (379–385 mi)	108 kW	28 min	2,228 kg (4,912 lb)
eπ M8
2026 EREV	45.66 kWh LFP Sunwoda	339 kg (747 lb)	1.5 L DFMC15TPE I4 turbo; 121 hp (90 kW; 123 PS) at 5,200 rpm	215 kW TZ225XYH02 PMSM	288 hp (215 kW; 292 PS)	380 N⋅m (280 lb⋅ft)	220 km (137 mi)	300 km (186 mi)	182 kW	14.3 min	2,299 kg (5,068 lb)
2026 EV	77.38 kWh LFP CATL	532 kg (1,173 lb)	—	230 kW TZ225XYH01 PMSM	309 hp (230 kW; 313 PS)	395 N⋅m (291 lb⋅ft)	—	600 km (373 mi)	310 kW	15.5 min	2,218–2,235 kg (4,890–4,927 lb)

== Sales ==
The eπ M8 received over 10,000 pre-orders within 24 hours after pre-sales opened on 27 June 2026.

Year	China		Total
Year	EV	EREV	Total
2024	6,399	11,616	18,105
2025	9,741	14,792	24,533
