= ATL (company) =

Chinese battery manufacturer

Amperex Technology Limited
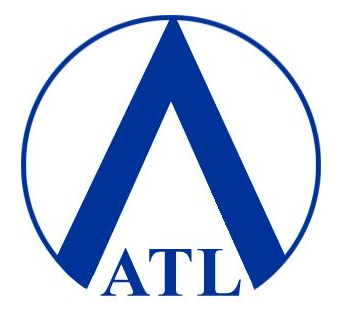
- Native name: 新能源科技有限公司
- Industry: Energy storage; Battery recycling
- Founded: 1999; 27 years ago
- Founder: Robin Zeng
- Headquarters: Hong Kong
- Key people: Robin Zeng; Huang Shilin; Joe Kit Chu Lam
- Revenue: Over ¥500 billion (FY2023)
- Net income: Over ¥90 billion (FY2023)
- Number of employees: 42,000 (2022)
- Website: www.atlbattery.com

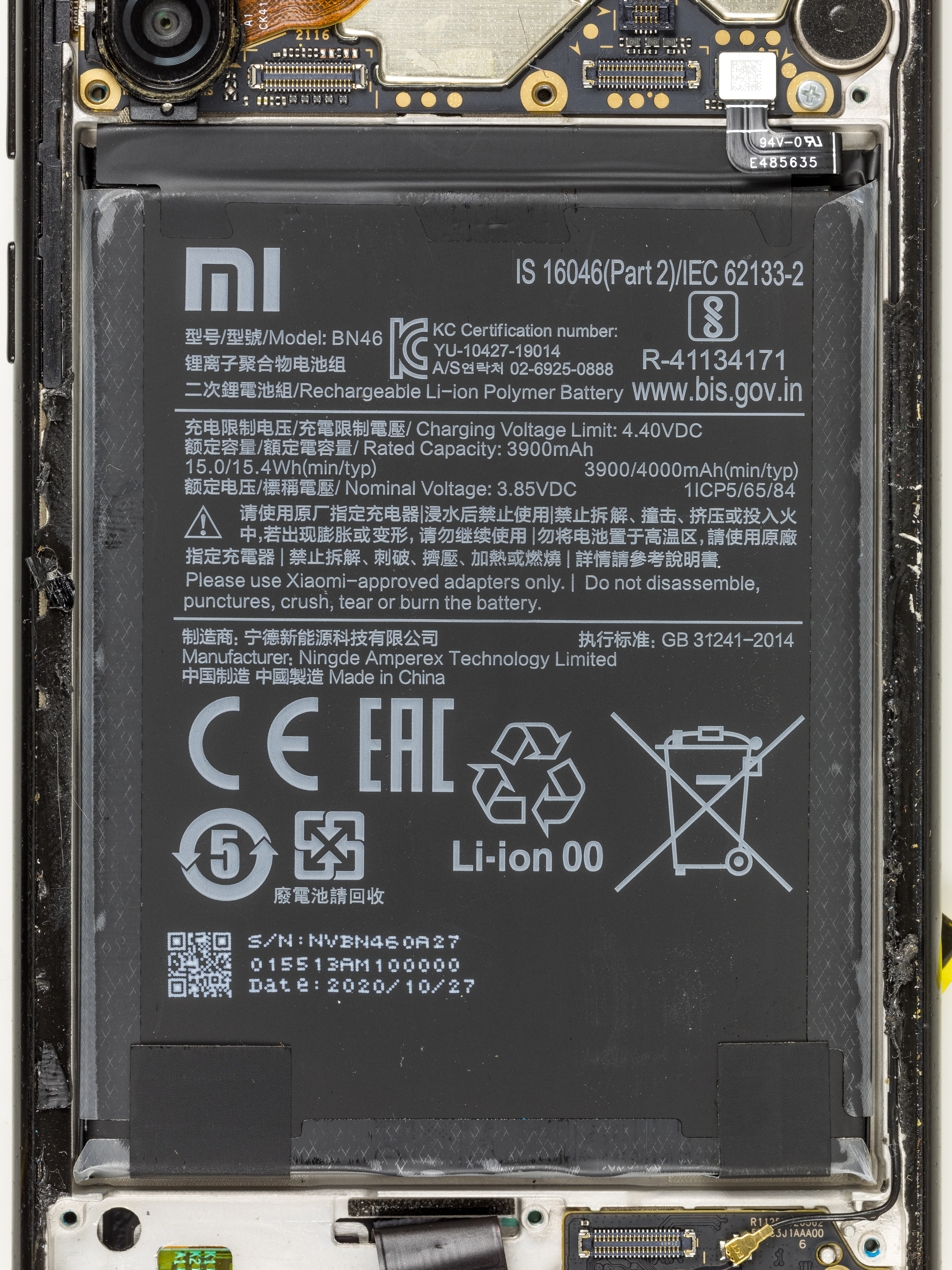
Li-ion Polymer battery Ningde Amperex Technology BN46

Amperex Technology Limited (ATL) is a battery manufacturing company founded in 1999 by Robin Zeng. The company specializes in the research, development, and manufacturing of rechargeable lithium-ion and lithium-ion polymer batteries. ATL is notable for supplying batteries used in mobile devices, including smartphones, laptops, and digital cameras, sourcing their products to tech companies such as Apple and Samsung.

ATL is headquartered in Hong Kong and has production facilities in Dongguan and Ningde, China, as well as a lithium-ion battery cell plant in Haryana, India, opened in 2025.

== Company history ==
Zeng Yuqun, more commonly known as Robin Zeng, founded ATL in 1999. Operating from the company headquarters in Hong Kong, Zeng acquired technology licenses from US companies to make batteries for laptops and MP3 players. In its early years the company made batteries only for portable consumer electronics.

Two years after establishment, ATL was able to produce batteries for 1 million devices. In the aftermath of this success, the company was acquired by TDK in 2005. Zeng continued managing ATL after the acquisition together with Huang Shilin. TDK's acquisition saw ATL expand its production into the smartphone market, becoming a key battery supplier to prominent technology companies like Samsung and Apple.

In 2006, ATL started exploring the electric vehicle (EV) battery market, with the first inquiry coming from Indian car company, Reva. Given the fundamental differences between batteries used in EVs and those in portable devices, ATL's founders Zeng and Huang established a dedicated research department for EV battery development.

In 2008, some of ATL's early EV batteries were used in a demo fleet of electric buses during the Beijing Olympics. This marked the company's first foray into the EV market. The electric-bus fleet formed part of a Chinese government demonstration programme to promote electrified transport.

In 2011, Zeng and Huang separated ATL's EV battery business into a new company, Contemporary Amperex Technology Co. Limited (CATL).

In the first quarter of 2020, the global smartphone battery cell market reached a total value of US$1.5 billion, a 5% year-over-year increase in revenue. ATL ranked first with a 36.5% revenue share, followed by LG Chem and Samsung SDI, with the top three suppliers accounting for nearly 82% of market revenue. The growth was attributed to the adoption of higher-capacity and custom-designed lithium-ion polymer (Li-Po) cells by smartphone manufacturers. ATL supplied higher-capacity cells to leading smartphone OEMs. Later in 2020, the company expanded its operations to India by acquiring 180 acres of industrial land in Haryana, aiming to supply batteries to the country's smartphone and EV industries. In September 2025, ATL's Indian subsidiary opened a lithium-ion battery cell manufacturing plant at Sohna, near Gurugram in Haryana, inaugurated by Union minister Ashwini Vaishnaw. The plant produces lithium-ion batteries for mobile phones, wearable and hearable devices, and laptops, and was planned to produce about 200 million battery packs annually at full capacity. Vaishnaw said this would meet roughly 40% of India's annual demand for mobile-phone battery packs.

In 2023, ATL formed strategic partnerships with Group14 Technologies and AM Batteries. The partnership with Group14 Technologies aimed at integrating advanced silicon battery technology to improve ATL's battery performance, while the collaboration with AM Batteries focused on developing solvent-free electrode manufacturing technology, addressing environmental concerns in the lithium-ion battery production industry.

== Footprint ==
ATL is headquartered in Hong Kong, with subsidiaries in Ningde and Dongguan, China, as well as India.

== Relationship with CATL ==
Huang Shilin co-founded ATL along with Zeng Yuqun in 1999, and would later become the vice chairman and Zeng's second in command at CATL.

CATL was formed in 2011 as a spin-off of ATL's EV battery division.

In 2021, Ampace was founded as a joint venture between ATL and CATL. The company is headquartered in Xiamen. While ATL has generally specialized in small batteries such as those used in smartphones and laptops, and CATL has specialized in large batteries used in EVs, Ampace has focused on medium-sized batteries such as those used in electric scooters, UAVs, and power tools.

In April 2022, ATL and CATL partnered to establish a joint venture called the "Xiamen Ampcore Technology Limited" to further expand into the electric vehicles business. Xiamen Ampcore Technology Limited's capital is 5 billion RMB, with ATL having a 30% stake and CATL having a 70% stake. The same year, ATL and CATL also established a battery pack joint venture called "Xiamen Ampack Technology Limited" capital is RMB 1 billion, with ATL holding 70% and CATL holding 30%. ATL established Xiamen Ampeak Technology Limited, in which ATL owns 100% of the shares, as a holding company of the two joint ventures.

In January 2024, Ampace launched a battery management system (BMS) intended to improve safety and reliability in medium-sized applications. Other products developed by Ampace include the Andes 600 Pro, a 600 watt portable power station, and the Kunlun series ultra-long lifecycle batteries.

== Relationship with TDK ==
TDK acquired ATL in 2005 for about US$100 million. ATL had been in financial difficulty before the acquisition. ATL is a consolidated subsidiary of TDK, which holds a 100% equity stake in the company. It went on to become the largest supplier of smartphone batteries, and in the year to March 2023 it posted revenue above ¥500 billion and net profit above ¥90 billion.

In 2022, TDK expanded ATL's business beyond smartphone batteries into medium-sized batteries for products such as electric scooters, residential energy-storage systems, and cellular base-station power supplies, with the goal of doubling its lithium-ion battery revenue over the following five years. It pursued this in part through joint ventures with CATL focused on mid-sized cells. ATL recorded approximately ¥740 billion (US$6.4 billion) in the year to March 2021, accounting for about half of TDK's revenue.

TDK's 2024 medium-term business plan identified small rechargeable batteries for smartphones and personal computers as the core of its battery business, projecting an average annual growth rate of 2–3% for its battery and power-supply business through fiscal 2026 and planning about ¥320 billion of capital investment over the three years from fiscal 2024. The small batteries are made by ATL, which is pursuing higher energy density through high-value-added products such as cells using silicon-anode technology. Its main production bases are in China, but, citing geopolitical risk, production is also carried out in India, where a new plant in Haryana was scheduled to begin production in 2025.

ATL began selling lithium-ion batteries with silicon anodes in 2023. Later versions stored more energy than comparable graphite-anode batteries, and TDK planned to begin mass production of third-generation silicon-anode cells in 2025, driven by the spread of artificial-intelligence features in mobile devices. TDK reported higher sales of small-capacity rechargeable batteries, ATL's main product line, in the fiscal year ended March 2026.

In May 2026, TDK announced that its subsidiary Amperex Technology (Singapore) Pte. Ltd. would acquire 100% of the shares of Malaysia-based Linergy Power Sdn Bhd, making Linergy a wholly-owned subsidiary, as part of efforts to diversify battery production outside China.
