= BAW Ruisheng M8 =

Mid-size MPV

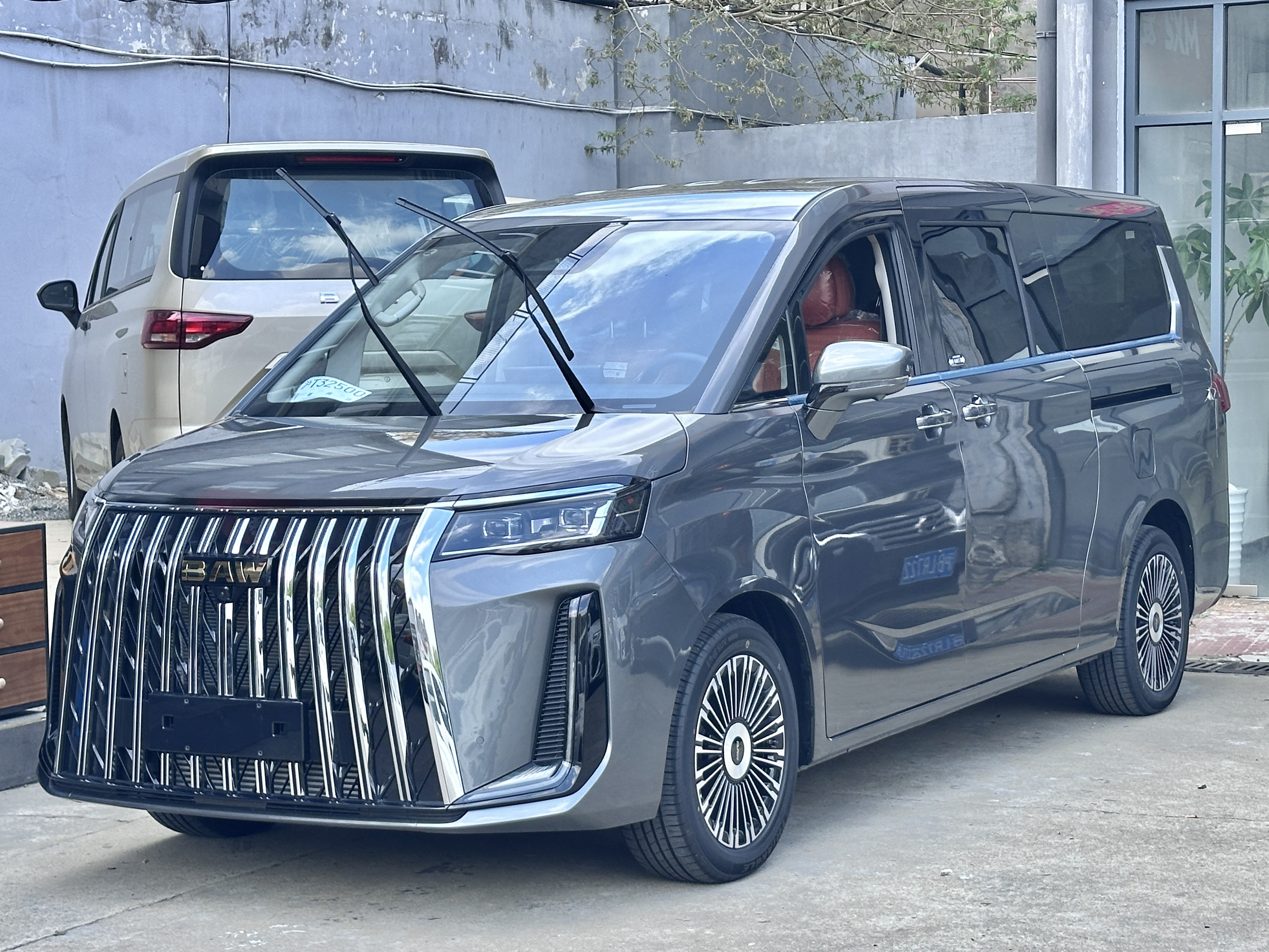

Overview
- Manufacturer: BAW
- Also called: BAW M8 (export)
- Production: 2025–present
- Assembly: China: Qingdao, Shandong; Indonesia: Purwakarta, West Java (HIM)

Body and chassis
- Class: Mid-size MPV (M)
- Body style: 5-door minivan
- Layout: ICE: Front-engine, rear-wheel-drive; EV/REEV: Rear-motor, rear-wheel-drive (EV); Front-motor, front-wheel-drive (EV; Thailand); Front-engine, rear-motor, rear-wheel-drive (REEV)
- Related: BAW Ruisheng Wangpai M7

Powertrain
- Engine: Petrol + CNG: 2.0 L LQ481QSF I4; REEV + CNG: 1.5 L Turbo H15RT I4
- Electric motor: 170 kW (230 PS; 230 hp) permanent magnet synchronus
- Transmission: ICE: 5-speed manual; EV/REEV: Single-speed gear reduction
- Battery: EV: 81 or 92kWh lithium iron phosphate batteries CATL; REEV: 35 or 46kWh lithium iron phosphate batteries CATL
- Range: 505–560 km (314–348 mi) (EV; CLTC); 408 km (254 mi) (EV; NEDC); 1,370–1,420 km (850–880 mi) (REEV; CLTC)
- Electric range: 180–230 km (110–140 mi) (CLTC; REEV)

Dimensions
- Wheelbase: 3,200 mm (126.0 in)
- Length: 5,317 mm (209.3 in)
- Width: 1,870 mm (73.6 in)
- Height: 1,955 mm (77.0 in)

The BAW Ruisheng M8 (Chinese: 锐胜M8, Ruisheng M8) is a mid-size MPV manufactured by BAW since 2025.

== Overview ==
Based on the extended platform of the Ruisheng Wangpai M7, The Ruisheng M8 is available as a 7-seater MPV or a 9-seater MPV.

The Ruisheng M8 is available in one single powertrain options, a 2.0 liter inline-4 pure gasoline engine plus CNG producing 122Ps and 175 N⋅m (129 lb⋅ft) mated to a 5-speed manual transmission.

== BAW Ruisheng M8 NEV ==
The battery electric and range extended variants are sold as the Ruisheng M8 NEV. The battery electric variant offers a maximum driving range of 310 km, while the range extended variant can reach up to 600 km. The range extended variant is equipped with a 1.5 liter turbo engine, connected to a 46kWh battery and 65 liter gas tank enabling a CLTC battery electric range of 230km and a combined range of 1420km. The battery electric variant is equipped with a rear positioned motor with a maximum output of 170kW with an option of either a 92kWh or a 81kWh with a CLTC range of 560km and 505km respectively.

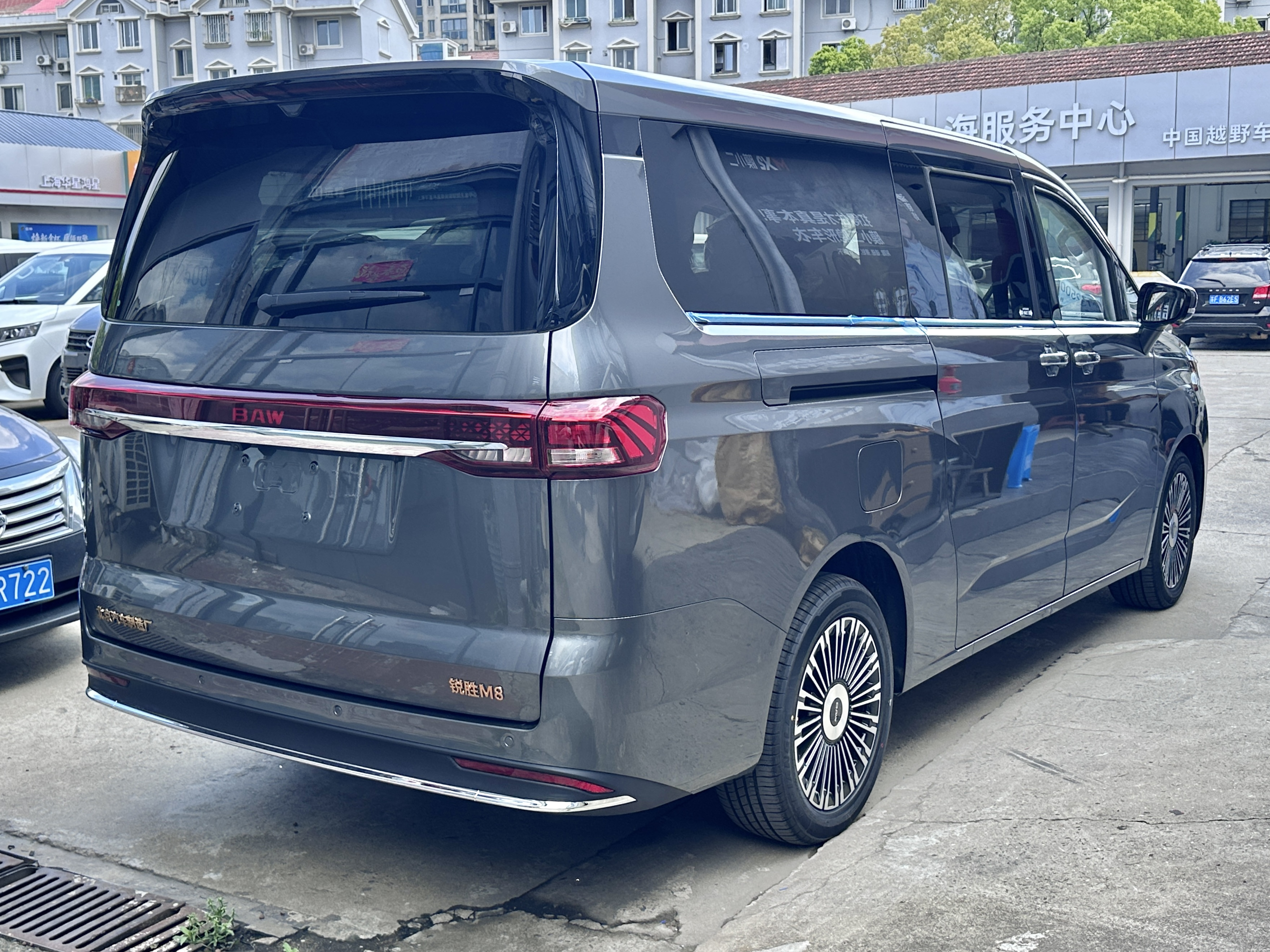
Rear view

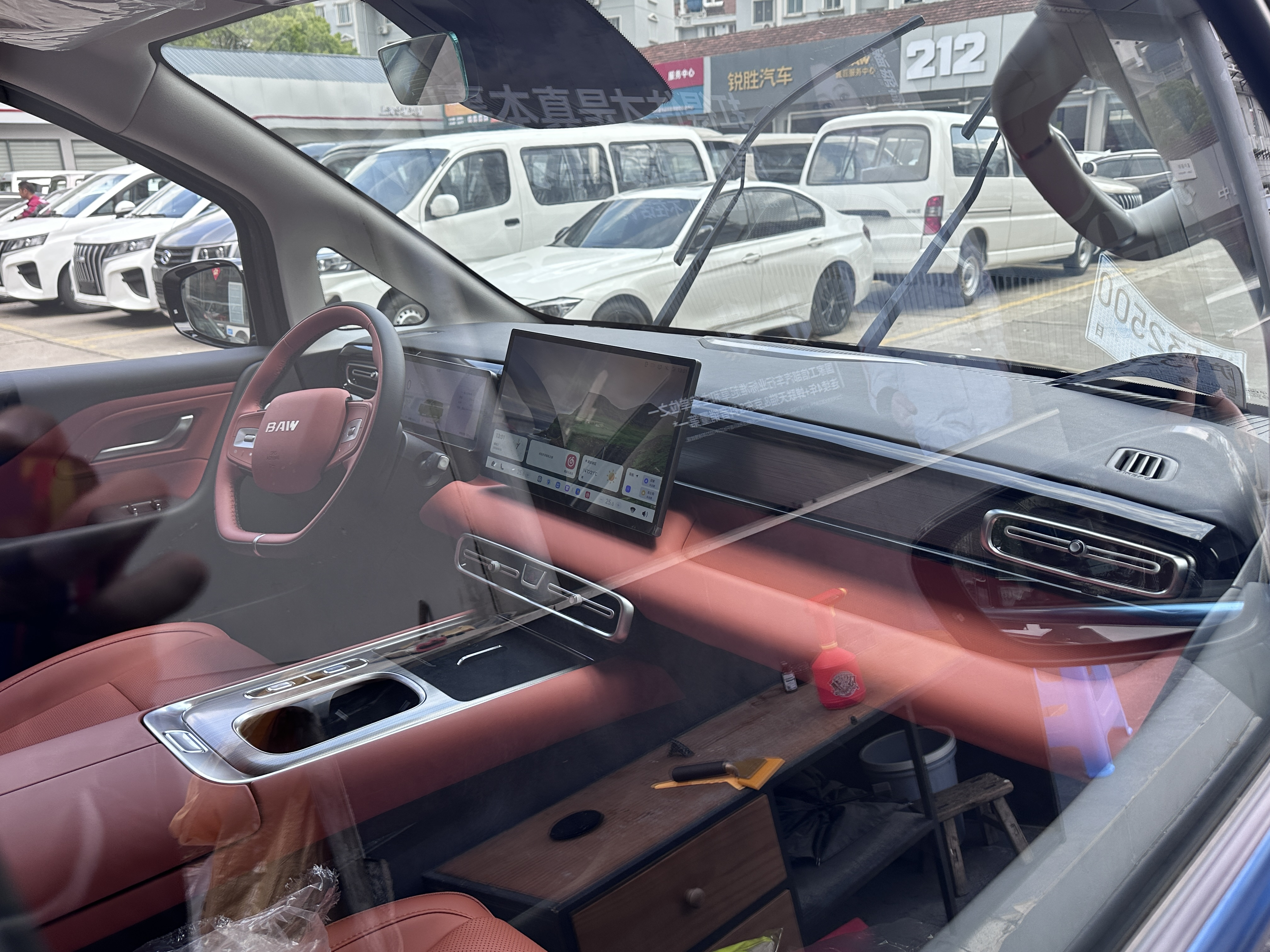
Interior
