= Robin Zeng =

Chinese billionaire business magnate

- 曾毓群
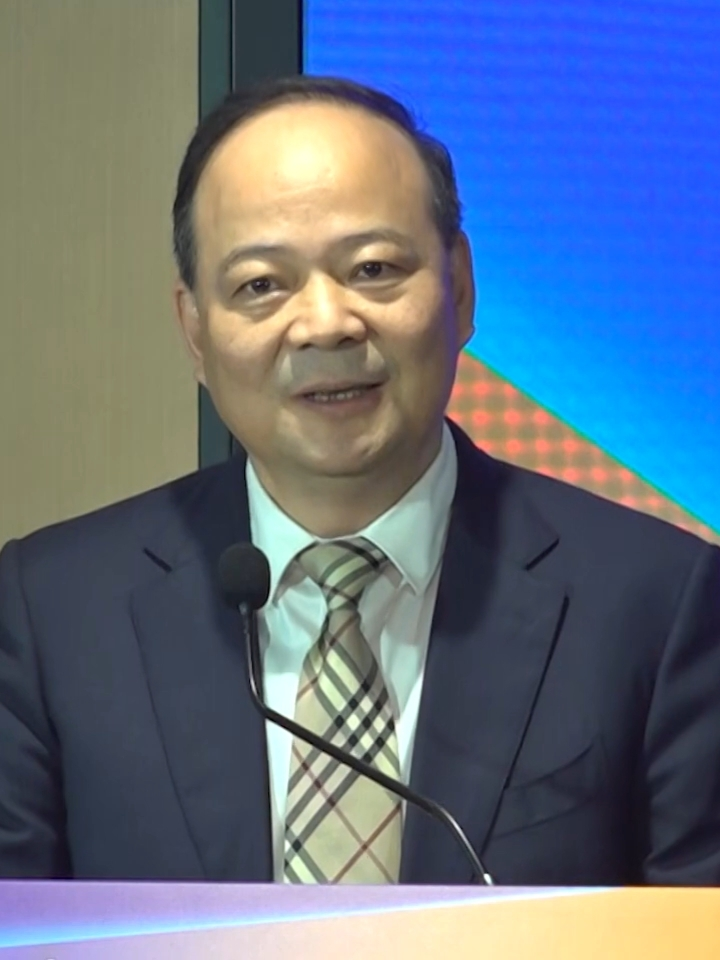
- Zeng in 2023
- Born: 1968 (age 57–58); Ningde, China
- Education: Shanghai Jiaotong University (BEng); South China University of Technology (MSc); Institute of Physics, Chinese Academy of Sciences (PhD)
- Occupations: Businessman; battery engineer; physicist
- Organization: All-China Federation of Industry and Commerce
- Title: Founder and chairman of CATL
- Term: 2011-

Robin Zeng
- Simplified Chinese: 曾毓群
Transcriptions
Standard Mandarin
- Hanyu Pinyin: Zēng Yùqún

Robin Zeng Yuqun (born 1968) is a Chinese billionaire businessman. He is the founder and chairman of the battery manufacturer CATL (Contemporary Amperex Technology), and a vice chairman of the All-China Federation of Industry and Commerce.

As of 2026, Zeng is among wealthiest people in the world with an estimated networth of US$63.0 Billion according to Forbes and the Bloomberg Billionaires Index.

== Early life ==
Zeng is from Fujian Province. He earned a marine engineering degree from Shanghai Jiaotong University, an MSc in electronics and information engineering from South China University of Technology in 2001, and a PhD in physics from the Institute of Physics, Chinese Academy of Sciences in 2006.

== Career ==
Zeng worked at a state-owned shipbuilding company in Fujian Province early in his career. He later joined an electronic parts factory after graduation where he worked for 10 years. He then co-founded Amperex Technology Limited (ATL) in 1999 with two former colleagues. The company produced lithium polymer batteries for digital gadgets, including iPhones, according to a Financial Times report in 2018. In 2005, ATL was acquired by Japan's TDK, but Zeng continued as a manager for ATL.

In 2012, Zeng and vice-chairman Huang Shilin spun-off the electric vehicle battery operations of ATL into a new company CATL, which manufactures lithium-ion rechargeable batteries, and became a world leader in the following years. In 2017, CATL went public on the Shenzhen Stock Exchange. In 2024, CATL ventured into renewable energy, power grids and electrical energy storage systems.
