= Dongfeng eπ 007 =

Full-size liftback sedan and shooting brake

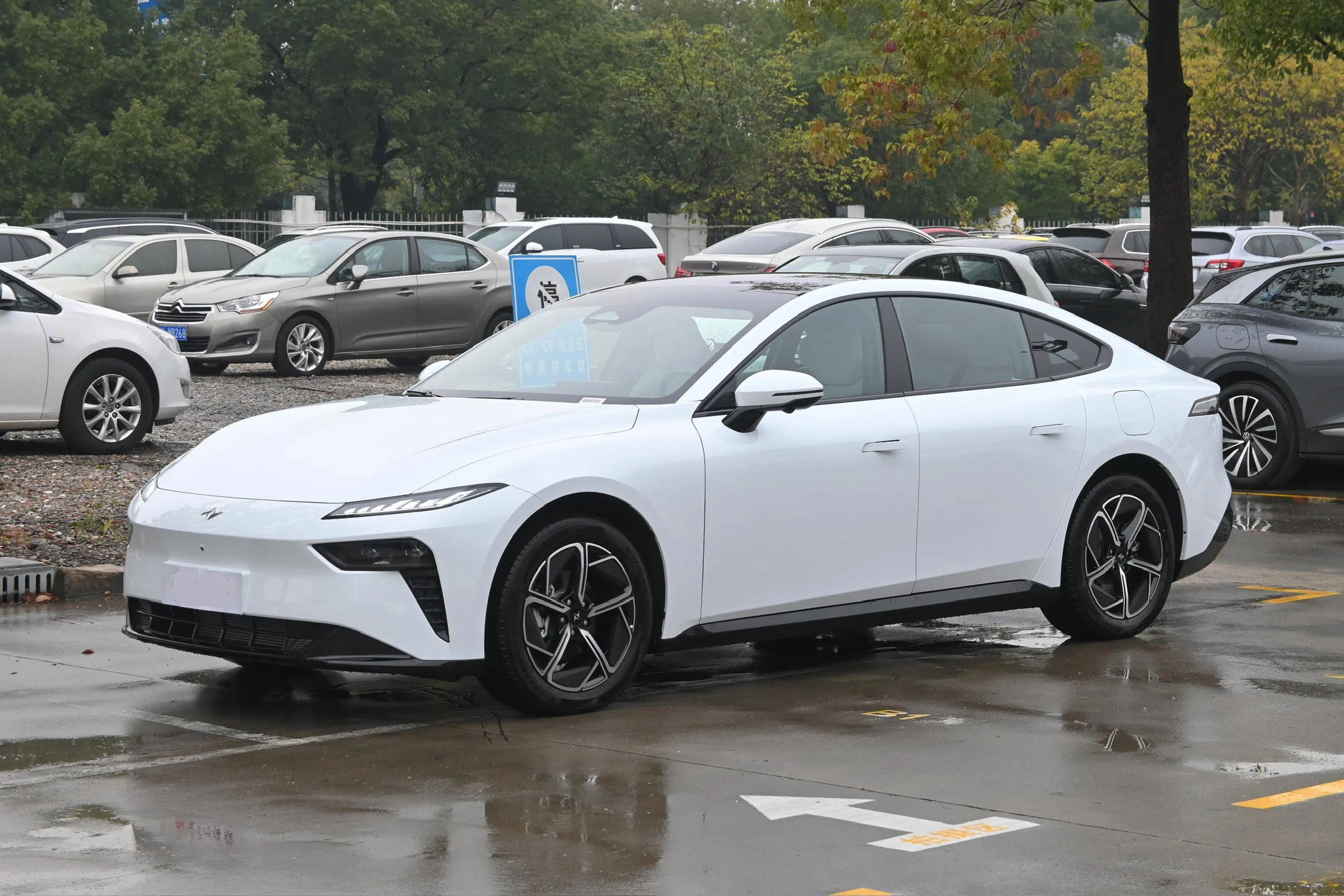

Overview
- Manufacturer: Dongfeng Motor Corporation
- Also called: Dongfeng Ace 007; Dongfeng 007 (export); Dongfeng eπ EP7 (2026, Huawei ADS); Aeolus E80 (2026)
- Production: 2024–present
- Assembly: China: Wuhan

Body and chassis
- Class: Full-size car (E)
- Body style: 5-door liftback; 5-door shooting brake (GT)
- Layout: Front-engine, rear-motor, rear-wheel drive (EREV); Rear-motor, rear-wheel-drive; Dual-motor, all-wheel-drive
- Platform: Quantum Architecture
- Related: Dongfeng eπ 008; Forthing Xinghai S7

Powertrain
- Engine: Petrol range extender: 1.5 L DFMC15DE I4
- Electric motor: PMSM
- Power output: 160–400 kW (215–536 hp) (EV); 160 kW (215 hp) (EREV)
- Hybrid drivetrain: Range-extended electric
- Battery: 28.39 kWh LFP CALB/Sunwoda; 35.03 kWh LFP Sunwoda; 56.83 kWh LFP Sunwoda; 70.26 kWh LFP Sunwoda; 73.5 kWh LFP Sunwoda
- Range: 1,200–1,308 km (746–813 mi) (EREV)
- Electric range: 530–650 km (329–404 mi) (EV, CLTC); 163–225 km (101–140 mi) (EREV, WLTC); 200–308 km (124–191 mi) (EREV, CLTC)

Dimensions
- Wheelbase: 2,915 mm (114.8 in)
- Length: 4,880 mm (192.1 in)
- Width: 1,865 mm (73.4 in)
- Height: 1,460 mm (57.5 in)
- Curb weight: 1,759–1,999 kg (3,878–4,407 lb)

The Dongfeng eπ 007 (pronounced 'e pi'; also known as Yipai 007, Dongfeng Ace 007 or simply Dongfeng 007), is a battery electric and plug-in hybrid full-size liftback sedan and shooting brake produced by Chinese automobile manufacturer Dongfeng Motor Corporation under the Dongfeng eπ (东风奕派) sub-brand. It is the first product of the eπ sub-brand, and was launched in March 2024. The batteries of the Dongfeng eπ 007 are supplied by the United Auto Battery System (UABS), a joint venture between SAIC and CATL.

== Overview ==
The Dongfeng eπ 007 is an electric sedan with a drag coefficient of 0.209 Cd with optional scissor doors and an electric rear wing. It is based on Dongfeng's Quantum intelligent electric modular architecture, or simply Quantum Architecture. The interior features an infotainment system powered by a Qualcomm Snapdragon 8155 chip and features a flippable 8.8-inch full LCD instrument panel and a 15.6-inch central control screen in the interior.

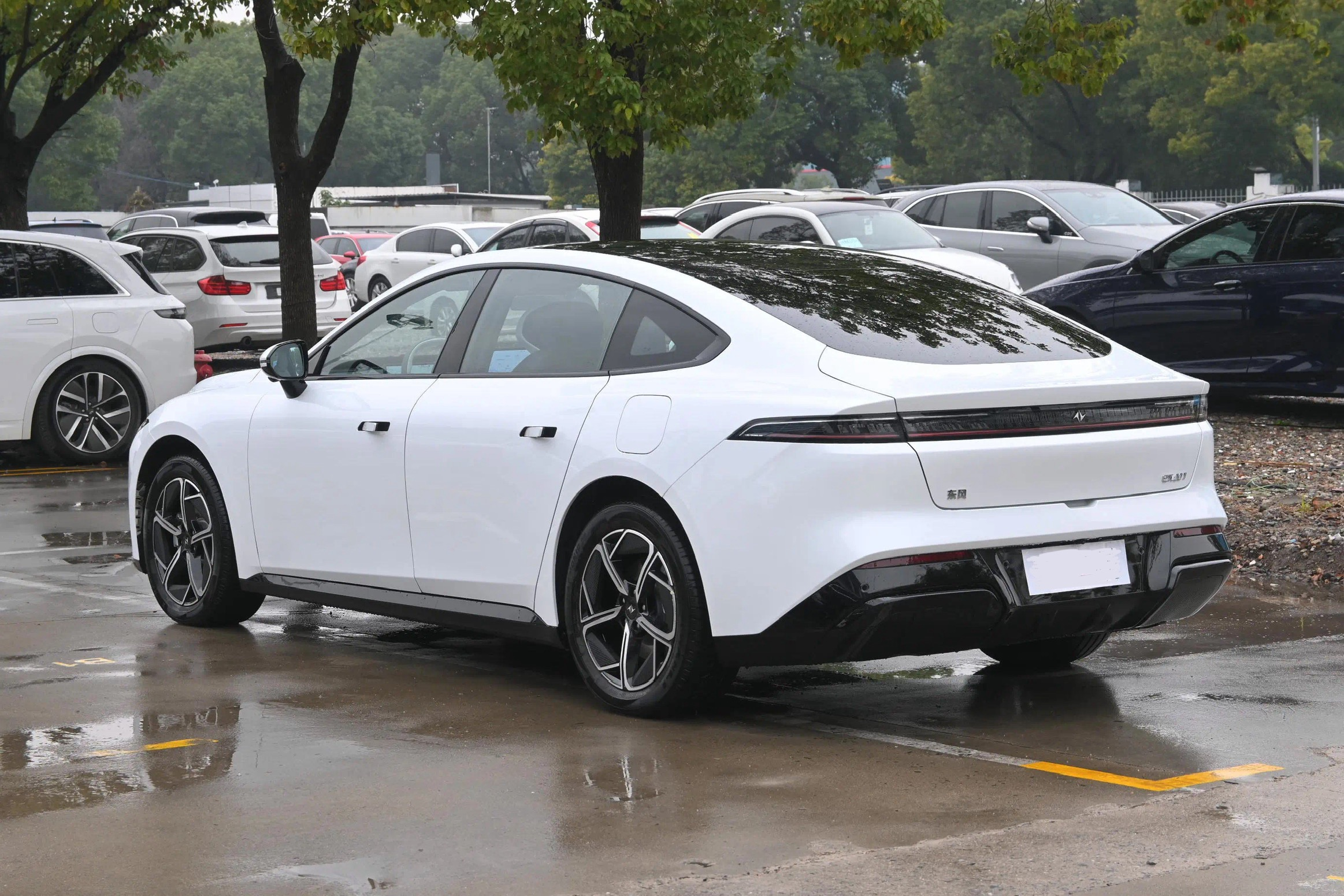
Rear view

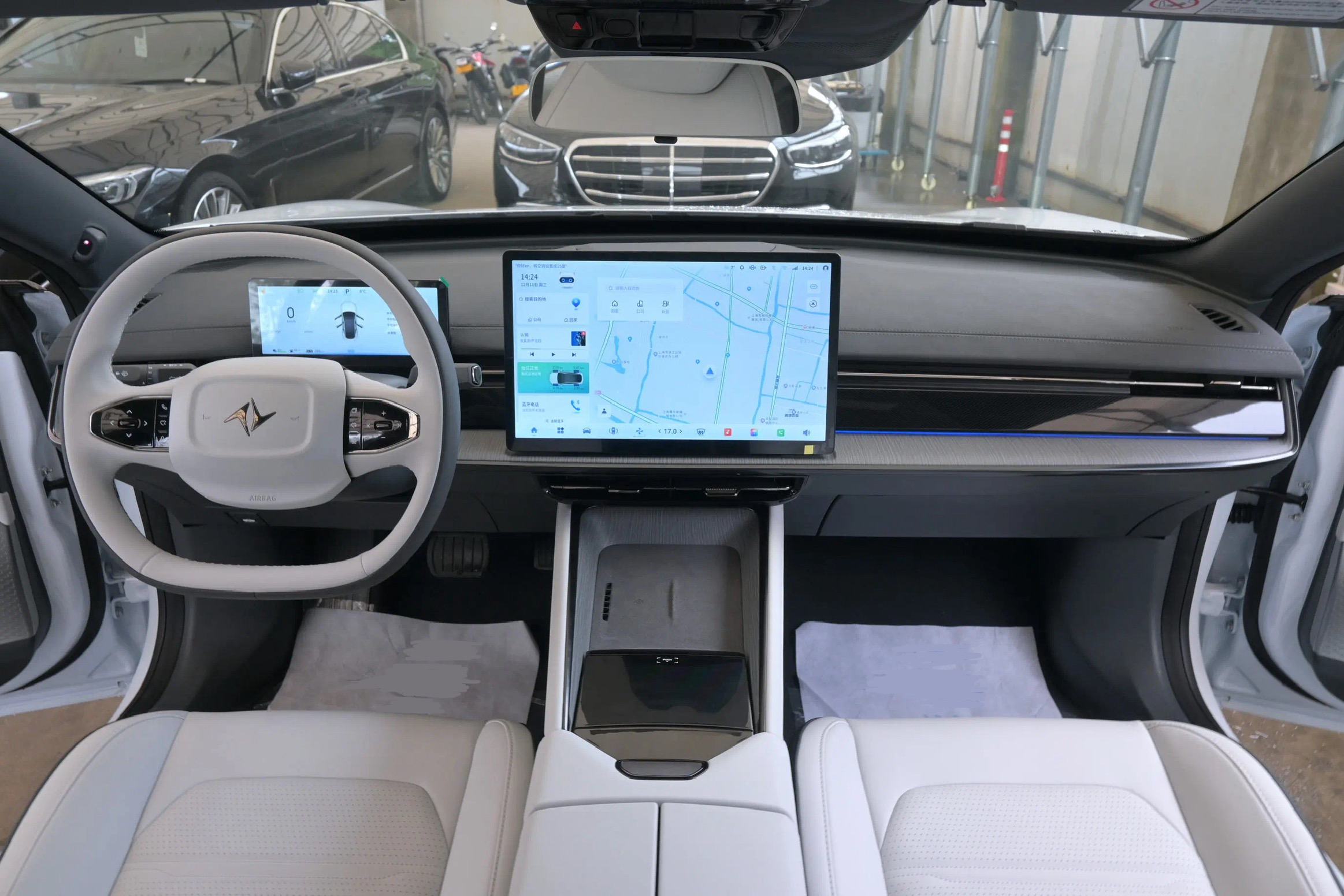
Interior

=== 2026 update ===
The 2027 model year update for the 007 launched on 30 October 2026.

The exterior features new pearlescent black and metallic purple paint options. It now features a 32-litre (1.1 cu ft) frunk and a rear cargo area of 490 L (17.3 cu ft) with power liftgate. The interior has a new white upholstery option and the infotainment system has been upgraded to use the Qualcomm Snapdragon 8295P chip ln higher models.

The ADAS system has been upgraded to the optional Tianyuan T200 (Chinese: 天元T200; pinyin: tiānyuán T200) system, which features a sensor suite consisting of one Hesai ATX roof-mounted LiDAR, 1 mmWave radar, 11 cameras, and 12 ultrasonic sensors. It is powered by a Horizon Robotics J6M chip providing 128TOPS, and is capable of Level 2 supervised autonomous driving on highway and urban conditions.

The powertrain remains unchanged, but the larger battery model now achieves a CLTC rating of 575 kilometres (357 mi).

== Aeolus E80 ==
The Aeolus E80 (Chinese: 东风风神E80; pinyin: dōngfēng fēngshén E80) is a rebadged 007 sold under the Aeolus brand which launched in September 2026. It features a 10.25-inch segmented LCD instrument cluster with an embedded monochrome information display, a 12.95-inch central infotainment touchscreen, polyurethane steering wheel with HVAC and headlight controls, smaller 17-inch wheels with 225/60 R17 tires, minimal ADAS system with a rearview camera, manual climate control without rear seat vents, and 4-speaker sound system. It also has a unique smaller battery pack which provides 515 kilometres (320 mi) of CLTC range.

== Powertrain ==
The Dongfeng eπ 007 is available as a rear-wheel-drive 200 Pro EREV entry model with a 28.39 kWh battery with a CLTC cycle 200 km (124 mi) pure electric range and 1,200 km (750 mi) comprehensive range, or 163 km (101 mi) on the WLTC cycle. It is powered by a rear electric motor producing 160 kW (215 hp; 218 PS) and 310 N⋅m (229 lb⋅ft) of torque with a 0 to 100 km/h (62 mph) acceleration time of 7.2 seconds. The range-extender engine is a naturally aspirated 1.5-liter petrol four-cylinder that outputs 103 hp (77 kW; 104 PS) and 137 N⋅m (101 lb⋅ft) of torque, for a net power rating of 74 kW (99 hp; 101 PS). For 2025, electric range was increased to 230 km (143 mi) (170 km (106 mi) WLTC) and 30–80% charging time was reduced from 26 to 12 minutes. For 2026, the battery capacity was increased to 35.03 kWh for an electric range of 308 km (191 mi) (225 km (140 mi) WLTC).

For electric versions, a 530 Pro trim with a 56.83 kWh battery for a range of 530 km (329 mi) and an electric motor producing 160 kW (215 hp; 218 PS) and 310 N⋅m (229 lb⋅ft) of torque with a 0 to 100 km/h (62 mph) acceleration time of 6.8 sec. A 620 Pro trim with a 70.26 kWh battery for a range of 620 km (385 mi) and an electric motor producing 200 kW (268 hp; 272 PS) and 320 N⋅m (236 lb⋅ft) of torque with a 0 to 100 km/h (62 mph) acceleration time of 5.8 seconds. The top trim 540 AWD Max model features the same 70.26 kWh battery and two electric motors producing a combined 400 kW (536 hp; 544 PS) and 640 N⋅m (472 lb⋅ft) capable of a 0 to 100 km/h (62 mph) acceleration in 3.9 seconds and a range of 540 km (336 mi). For 2025, both batteries were updated with new capacities of 58.4 kWh and 73.5 kWh with incremental increases in range and the 30–80% charging time was reduced from 26 to 16 minutes. For 2026, the smaller battery option was dropped.

Specifications
Model	Year	Battery		Power	Torque	Electric range		DC charging		0–100 km/h (62 mph)	Kerb weight
Model	Year	Type	Weight	Power	Torque	WLTP	CLTC	Peak	30–80%	0–100 km/h (62 mph)	Kerb weight
eπ 007 EV
530	2024	56.83 kWh	445 kg (981 lb)	160 kW (215 hp; 218 PS)	310 N⋅m (229 lb⋅ft)		530 km (329 mi)		26 min	6.8 s	1,767 kg (3,896 lb)
550	2025–present	58.35 kWh	421 kg (928 lb)	160 kW (215 hp; 218 PS)	310 N⋅m (229 lb⋅ft)		550 km (342 mi)	188 kW	16 min	6.8 s	1,759 kg (3,878 lb)
620	2024	70.26 kWh	528 kg (1,164 lb)	200 kW (268 hp; 272 PS)	320 N⋅m (236 lb⋅ft)	520 km (323 mi)	620 km (385 mi)	200 kW	26 min	5.8 s	1,852 kg (4,083 lb)
540 AWD	2024	70.26 kWh	535 kg (1,179 lb)	400 kW (536 hp; 544 PS)	640 N⋅m (472 lb⋅ft)	389 km (242 mi)	540 km (336 mi)	200 kW	26 min	3.9 s	1,999 kg (4,407 lb)
650	2025–2026	73.48 kWh	506 kg (1,116 lb)	200 kW (268 hp; 272 PS)	310 N⋅m (229 lb⋅ft)		565 km (351 mi)	245 kW	16 min	5.7 s	1,852 kg (4,083 lb)
675	2026–present	73.48 kWh	506 kg (1,116 lb)	200 kW (268 hp; 272 PS)	310 N⋅m (229 lb⋅ft)		575 km (357 mi)	245 kW	16 min	5.7 s	1,852 kg (4,083 lb)
565 4WD	2025–2026	73.48 kWh	506 kg (1,116 lb)	400 kW (536 hp; 544 PS)	640 N⋅m (472 lb⋅ft)		650 km (404 mi)	245 kW	16 min	3.7 s	1,999 kg (4,407 lb)
Aeolus E80
515	2026–present	51.87 kWh	365 kg (805 lb)	160 kW (215 hp; 218 PS)	310 N⋅m (229 lb⋅ft)		515 km (320 mi)		17 min	7.2 s	1,657 kg (3,653 lb)
eπ 007 EREV
200	2024	28.39 kWh	248 kg (547 lb)	160 kW (215 hp; 218 PS)	310 N⋅m (229 lb⋅ft)	163 km (101 mi)	200 km (124 mi)		26 min	7.2 s	1,830 kg (4,034 lb)
230	2025	28.39 kWh	259 kg (571 lb)	160 kW (215 hp; 218 PS)	310 N⋅m (229 lb⋅ft)	170 km (106 mi)	230 km (143 mi)	116 kW	12 min	7.2 s	1,847 kg (4,072 lb)
308	2026	35.03 kWh	303 kg (668 lb)	160 kW (215 hp; 218 PS)	310 N⋅m (229 lb⋅ft)	225 km (140 mi)	308 km (191 mi)	144 kW	12 min	7.5 s	1,916 kg (4,224 lb)

== Markets ==
In the middle of 2024, the eπ 007 was presented in Spain, the Netherlands, Switzerland and Italy, but the presentation consisted exclusively of a demonstration of the car. Sales are expected to begin in Europe in the first quarter of 2025.

=== Belarus ===
The Belarus is the first export country where eπ 007 sales began. The official premiere of the liftback took place in Minsk on 2 October 2024, immediately after which the cars became available for order.

=== Malaysia ===
The Dongfeng 007 was launched in Malaysia on 5 February 2026, with two variants: Premium RWD and Prime AWD, both variants powered with a 73.48 kWh battery.

=== New Zealand ===
Launched in April 2026 as Dongfeng 007, priced at NZD54,990 for the Long Range rear drive model and NZD59,990 for the Performance all wheel drive version.

=== Singapore ===
Sold as the Dongfeng 007, it was launched on 18 October 2025. At launch, two variants were available, a 200 kW and 400 kW model both powered with a 73.48 kWh battery. It is the second Dongfeng EV to be sold after the Dongfeng Box.

The 99 kW (133 hp; 135 PS) variant with a 58.35 kWh battery was later launched on 29 October 2025.

== Safety ==
C-NCAP (2021) test results 2024 eπ007 530 Pro
Category		%
Overall:	5 /5 stars	89.3%
Occupant protection:		93.78%
Vulnerable road users:		71.65%
Active safety:		89.23%

== Sales ==
Year	China		
Year	EV	EREV	Total
2024	21,228	4,877	26,105
2025	16,867	5,412	22,279
