= Ampace =

Chinese battery technology company

- Native name: 新能安
- Type: Private
- Industry: Battery technology
- Founded: April 2021
- Founders: Contemporary Amperex Technology Limited (CATL) and Amperex Technology Limited (ATL)
- Headquarters: Xiamen, Fujian, China
- Products: Lithium-ion batteries for energy storage systems, electric two-wheelers, and medium-sized electronic devices
- Website: www.ampacetech.com

Ampace (also known as Xinneng'an in the Chinese market, Chinese: 新能安) is a battery technology company specializing in the development of lithium-ion batteries for energy storage systems such as micro electric vehicles, drones, and robotics.

== Background ==
Ampace was established in April 2021 as a joint venture between Contemporary Amperex Technology Limited (CATL) and Amperex Technology Limited (ATL). From the beginning, the company’s main focus has been on energy storage systems, micro electric vehicles, and medium-sized electronic devices, as well as research on battery technology improvement.

== Operations ==
Headquartered in Xiamen, Fujian province, Ampace operates in markets across North America, Europe, and Asia, among others. As of April 2023, the company reported a customer base of over 41 million across 29 countries and regions.

In December 2022, the company initiated a manufacturing project in Xiamen, developing a 900-acre site dedicated to lithium-ion battery production. The facility includes production lines for battery cells, modules, and battery packs, with a projected annual production capacity of 32 gigawatt-hours (GWh).

In September 2023, the company started selling the Kunlun Battery Cell, which was unveiled at the RE+ trade show in Las Vegas. Kunlun is designed for stationary and solar power storage applications. It has an estimated 15,000-cycle lifespan, reported to maintain over 80% state of health (SOH) after these cycles and over 70% SOH after 20,000 cycles, aligning with the 20-year lifespan of photovoltaic equipment.

In March 2024, the company introduced Jumbo Power, a battery series targeting cordless power tools in Shanghai. The following month, the Ampace launched Ampace C5, an energy storage facility for both commercial and industrial use in Beijing. By July, the company unveiled the Andes 1500 Portable Power Station, a portable energy storage solution with a 1,462Wh capacity and a lifespan of up to 6,000 cycles.

In September 2024, Ampace launched the Kun-Era batteries for electric motorcycles at the 22nd China International Motorcycle Trade Exhibition. In December of the same year, the company introduced the JP30 cylindrical lithium battery, featuring a compact 18650 specification size and improvements in discharge rate, charging efficiency, and cycle life.

In January 2025, the company revealed its E30P Cell at the Bharat Battery Show. The E30P Cell is a high-capacity 35205 cylindrical lithium-ion battery featuring Ampace's Boost Power (BP) system, which enhances energy density, safety, and thermal stability, supports fast charging with 95% capacity reached in 47 minutes, and is designed for applications including electric motorcycles, scooters, and maxi-scooters.

== Technology and products ==
Ampace engages in battery technology research, focusing on improvements in energy density, thermal management, charging capabilities, and incorporating battery management systems to monitor performance and maintain safety standards.

=== Energy storage systems (ESS) ===
- Kunlun Battery Cell: Designed for stationary and solar power storage with a reported longevity exceeding 15,000 cycles, reducing overall lifecycle electricity costs.
- Andes 1500 Portable Power Station: Uses Ampace's proprietary A-Boost technology enabling the device to charge in approximately 55 minutes and provides up to 6,000 charge-discharge cycles according to company specifications. This portable energy storage solution offers a 1,462Wh capacity.
- Jumbo Power (JP series): A high-capacity storage system aimed at industrial and grid-scale applications.
- UniC C5: An all-in-one energy storage system for medium-sized commercial and industrial applications.

=== Electric mobility ===
- Kun-Era Battery Series: Developed for urban transport, including delivery bikes and off-road adventure vehicles.
- E30P Cell: Tailored for micro-electric vehicles (micro-EVs) and other urban mobility applications.
- Ampace provides additional battery packs designed for e-bikes and electric scooters, optimizing performance, range, and charging efficiency.

=== Industrial and consumer applications ===
- JP30 Cylindrical Lithium Battery: Designed for high discharge rates and rapid charging capabilities. These batteries represent an evolution of the 18650 form factor, with applications in power tools and industrial equipment.
- The company produces battery solutions for drones, robotics, vacuum cleaners, and power tools, catering to both consumer and industrial markets.
