= Group14 Technologies =

American manufacturer and supplier of advanced silicon battery technology

Group14 Technologies is an American manufacturer and supplier of technology for rechargeable lithium-silicon batteries.

Company headquarters are in Woodinville, Washington. Group14 operates a commercial factory in Woodinville, Washington.

Group14 customers include Porsche and Amperex Technology Limited (ATL).

== History ==
Group14 was founded in 2015 by Aaron Feaver, Rick Luebbe and Rick Costantino. It is named after Group 14 of the periodic table, which includes silicon.

In April 2021, Group14 built a factory in Woodinville.

In May 2022, Porsche AG announced plans to produce lithium-silicon EV battery cells with Group14's technology in Germany in 2024.

In October 2022, Group14 announced it received $100 million as part of the Battery Materials Processing and Battery Manufacturing award from the US Department of Energy's Office of Manufacturing and Energy Supply Chains (MESC).

In April 2023, Group14 announced plans to build a second factory in Moses Lake, Washington.

In September 2024, Group14 announced it had been selected for an award negotiation of up to $200M by the U.S. Department of Energy’s Office of Manufacturing and Energy Supply Chains.

== Technology ==
Group14's flagship product is SCC55, a silicon-carbon composite anode material.

== Applications ==
Group14 supplies SCC55 to consumer electronics manufacturer Amperex Technology Limited (ATL) for smartphones.

Group14 has partnered with BASF, the world’s largest chemical company, to develop EV-format lithium-ion cells incorporating silicon-dominant anodes (>50% SiC). Authored by Erica Eggleton, PhD, Dirk Wulff, PhD, and G. Joel Meyer, PhD, this study presents what we believe to be the first publicly available formulation specifically designed to enable the manufacture of silicon-dominant anodes. The formulation can be implemented directly or used as a technical foundation for further development of high-energy-density silicon anodes with extended cycle life.
