= Sila Nanotechnologies =

American battery manufacturer

Sila Nanotechnologies, Inc.
- Company type: Private
- Founded: 2011; 14 years ago
- Founder: Gleb Yushin, Alex Jacobs, and Gene Berdichevsky
- Headquarters: Alameda, California, United States
- Website: silanano.com

Sila Nanotechnologies, Inc. is an American battery manufacturer that produces lithium–silicon batteries using nanoengineered silicon particles. The company creates battery materials to replace traditional graphite anodes with a silicon-dominant composite material to increase energy density. The company is based in California.

== History ==
It was founded by Gleb Yushin, Alex Jacobs, and Gene Berdichevsky in 2011.

In 2022, Sila announced it would supply powder to its lead investor Mercedes Benz. In April 2023, the company announced the availability of Titan Silicon, its first anode product. In December 2023, Sila announced it would supply Titan Silicon to Panasonic. It raised $375 million to help finish its factory in Moses Lake, Washington.

== Products ==
=== Titan Silicon ===
Titan Silicon is an anode technology that promises range increases of 20% that charge 10-80% in as little as 20 minutes. The powder can replace 50-100% of the graphite in conventional anodes. It is 20% of the weight of graphite, and requires 50% less space.

== Applications ==
The company's batteries are used in the WHOOP 4.0 fitness tracker.

Daimler Benz announced its intention to use Titan Silicon anodes in its Mercedes-Benz G-Class vehicle. Panasonic also intends to use Sila's anode technology in its own lithium ion batteries.
