= StoreDot =

Israeli fast charging battery developer

StoreDot Ltd.
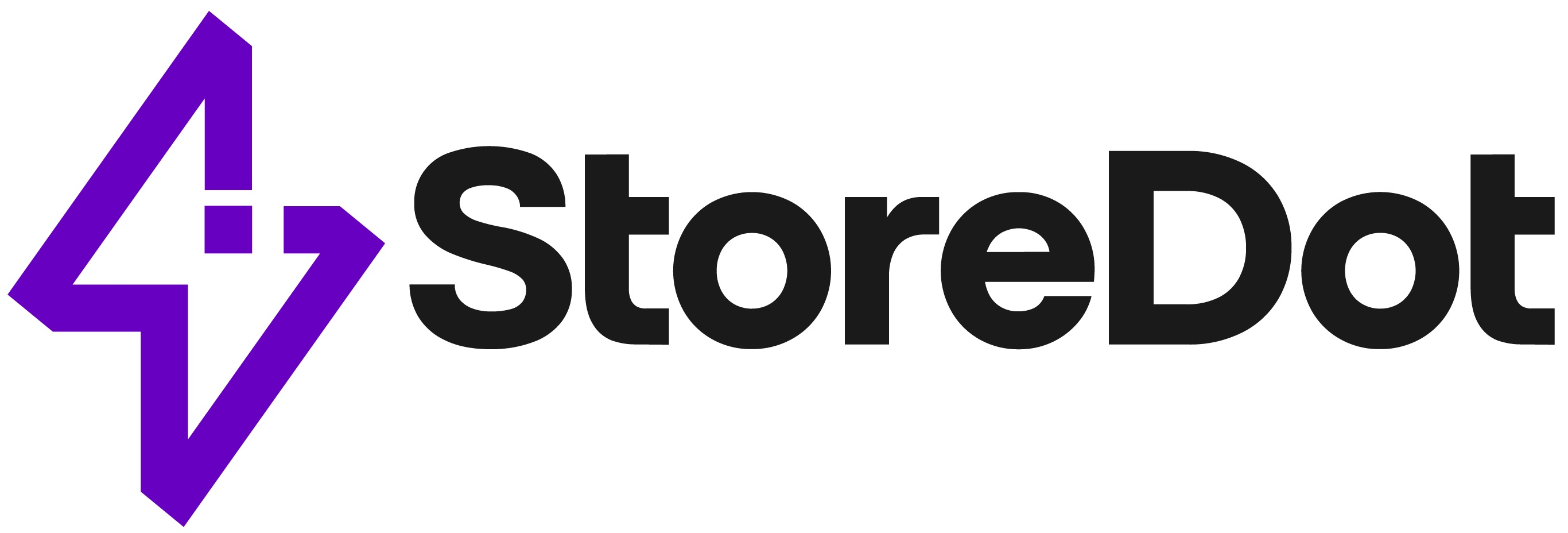
- Industry: automotive, electric batteries
- Founded: 2012; 14 years ago
- Founders: Doron Myersdorf, Simon Litsyn, and Gil Rosenman
- Headquarters: Herzliya, Israel
- Key people: Doron Myersdorf (CEO); Carl-Peter Forster (chairman)
- Products: Previously in development: peptide-based displays, batteries, and storage devices (2012-2019); organic-compound-based 30-second-charging mobile phone batteries (2014-2017) and 5-minute-charging electric car and UAV batteries (2014-2020); germanium-based fast-charging batteries for phones, scooters, and electric cars (2017-2020); Currently in development: silicon-based fast-charging electric car batteries (2019-)
- Owners: BP, Daimler, Samsung, TDK, Vingroup, Ola Electric, Samsung, TDK, EVE Energy, Volvo, Polestar
- Number of employees: 120 (2021)
- Subsidiaries: MolecuLED
- Website: store-dot.com

StoreDot is a developer of lithium-ion (Li-ion) batteries for electric vehicles founded in 2012 by Doron Myersdorf, Simon Litsyn, and Gil Rosenman. It is based in Herzliya, Israel.

The company was founded around developing peptide-based mobile phone displays and data storage. The company reported it was ready to commercially release these products: peptide-based displays by 2016; peptide-based batteries for mobile phones that fully charge in 30 seconds by 2016; germanium-based mobile phone batteries by 2019; electric car and aerial drone batteries that fully charge in five minutes by 2020; scooter batteries that fully charge in under five minutes by 2021; and silicon-graphite-electrode batteries in 2025. None of the aforementioned products have been commercially released as of February 2026. Financial journalists estimated in February 2026 that StoreDot has funding for a few more months of operations. StoreDot stated in 2026 it needs two more years of development in order to commercialize its product.

== Product development ==
=== Displays ===
StoreDot was founded in 2012 by Doron Myersdorf, Simon Litsyn, and Gil Rosenman, initially developing displays and storage devices based on research by Ehud Gazit. A year later its CEO, Myersdorf, said their peptide-based display technology is ready to be "packed and sold" and its related intellectual property could be sold for 300 million dollars. The displays and storage devices were based on "peptide nanocrystals", and a prototype storage device was made in 2012 that is "three times faster than conventional memory." The company's CEO said the display technology is 20% more power-efficient and 90% less costly to manufacture than OLED, and the displays were ready in 2015 for full-scale manufacturing using existing factories and manufacturing processes, and were to be commercialized by 2016. By 2019 the display technology was spun off into its own company, MolecuLED. As of 2022, MolecuLED had no employees.

=== Organic compound peptide-based batteries ===
StoreDot reported in 2014 to have developed organic-compound peptide-based smartphone batteries capable of being fully charged within 30 seconds. The company said its 30-second-charging organic-compound-based battery would be commercially available for smartphones by 2016. The company announced its 5-minutes-to-full-charge organic batteries will be available for 300-mile-range electric vehicles and aerial drones by 2020.

The company acknowledged in 2015 that its claims regarding its organic batteries have not been scientifically peer-reviewed.

=== Germanium batteries ===
The company was developing germanium-based batteries by 2017, citing graphite-free batteries and an electric vehicle battery that fully charges in five minutes, expecting "millions of cars" to be equipped with its electric vehicle battery by 2020. The company announced in 2018 that its mobile phone battery would be commercially available by 2019, and that it had plans to build a battery factory in the United States by 2022. In 2019 it announced the commercialization of a 168-cell germanium-tin battery for electric scooters, and stated that its mobile phone products would be commercially available in late 2020 and the scooter battery would be commercially available in 2021. The company's CEO said its electric car battery would have ten times as many cells as the scooter battery, charge fast enough to add 300 miles of range in under five minutes, and have a cooling system; and that its batteries did not degrade.

A 2019 peer-reviewed study concluded that the company's stated battery capabilities have no basis in published, peer-reviewed literature, and listed its unreleased products. Science journalist John Timmer could not identify in 2021 any published research about the company's germanium battery technology.

=== Silicon batteries ===
The company started promoting its silicon-graphite-electrode batteries in 2019 and ceased development of its germanium-based batteries in 2020. The company sent germanium sample batteries to manufacturers in place of silicon sample batteries. The company's CEO said the germanium batteries were only developed as proof-of-concept, were only meant to be sold in small quantities, and that they were never released because they weren't sufficiently differentiated from the rest of the market.

Group14 Technologies has developed silicon nanoparticles called SCC55 which allow lithium-silicon batteries to charge from 10% to 80% state-of-charge in 10 minutes. StoreDot tested the material for use in their silicon batteries. The company was looking in 2023 for suppliers capable of manufacturing thousands of tonnes of this material, which is critical for their business. The battery cells have a sponge-like carbon electrode imbued with silicon nanoparticles that react with the lithium ions, keeping the silicon's expansion within the carbon "sponge".

==== Commercialization ====
The company announced in November 2021 that it aims to achieve mass-manufacturing in 2024 of its silicon batteries, having pouch-cell samples produced by its manufacturing partner EVE Energy sent to be tested by global car makers. The company announced in 2023 that its batteries will be commercially available in VinFast vehicles in 2025. The CEO said that the company does not plan to become a battery manufacturer or supplier, but instead plans to license its technology to major manufacturers or lease dedicated manufacturing capacity from existing suppliers, saying its silicon batteries can be manufactured using existing factories and manufacturing processes. StoreDot demonstrated its batteries in a prototype Polestar 5 sedan in 2024, however the 2025 model was not set to debut with StoreDot batteries but with batteries developed and manufactured by SK On. StoreDot batteries were still in the testing phase in October 2024 and they had not been incorporated into any upcoming vehicle platforms. StoreDot stated in 2026 it needs two more years of development in order to commercialize its product.

==== Charge rate ====
The company's planned 2025 batteries were projected to have a peak charging rate of 350kW and a service life of 1000 fast-charging cycles. StoreDot battery cells require liquid cooling within each cell during fast charging. StoreDot announced their 2025 batteries would charge at a rate that adds 100 miles in 5 minutes for a vehicle that uses 14kWh per 100 kilometers, which corresponds to a charging rate of 270kW. StoreDot had been developing faster-charging cells that charge a 75kWh battery 70% in 10 minutes (from 10% to 80%) which corresponds to a charging rate of 315kW, which it aimed to deliver in 2026. StoreDot stated in 2026 it needs two more years of development in order to commercialize its product.

== Financing and valuation ==
StoreDot raised over 6 million dollars in an initial investment round, and by the end of 2014 had raised another 42 million dollars. It raised another 62 million dollars by the end of 2017. The company was in negotiations in March 2021 for a SPAC merger at a $3.5 billion valuation. A further funding round of 70-80 million dollars in 2022 gave it a $1.5 billion valuation. The company plans as of 2023 to raise further capital in 2024 or 2025 in order to build up its silicon nanoparticles supply chain and secure dedicated manufacturing capacity for its batteries from existing manufacturers. StoreDot signed a SPAC merger in 2025 at a valuation of $800M. The merger was cancelled in 2026 after the company could not secure $30M in cash for its operations. Financial journalists estimated in February 2026 that StoreDot has funding for a few more months of operations.
