= Lithium–silicon battery =

Silicon-based subclass of lithium-ion battery technology

Lithium–silicon batteries are lithium-ion batteries that employ a silicon-based anode and lithium ions as the charge carriers. Silicon-based materials, generally, have a much larger specific energy capacity: for example, 3600 mAh/g for pristine silicon. The standard anode material graphite is limited to a maximum theoretical capacity of 372 mAh/g for the fully lithiated state LiC_{6}.

Silicon's vast volume change (approximately 400% based on crystallographic densities) when lithium is inserted, along with high reactivity in the charged state, are obstacles to commercializing this type of anode. Commercial battery anodes may have small amounts of silicon, boosting their performance slightly. The amounts are closely held trade secrets, limited as of 2018 to, at most, 10% of the anode. Lithium-silicon batteries also include cell configurations where silicon is in compounds that may, at low voltage, store lithium by a displacement reaction, including silicon oxycarbide, silicon monoxide, or silicon nitride.

== History ==
The first laboratory experiments with lithium-silicon materials took place in the early to mid-1970s.

=== Silicon-graphite composite electrodes ===
Silicon carbon composite anodes were first reported in 2002 by Yoshio. Studies of these composite materials have shown that the capacities are a weighted average of the two end members (graphite and silicon). On cycling, electronic isolation of the silicon particles tends to occur with the capacity falling off to the capacity of the graphite component. This effect has been tempered using alternative synthetic methodologies or morphologies that can be created to help maintain contact with the current collector. This has been identified in studies involving grown silicon nanowires chemically bonded to the metal current collector by alloy formation. Sample production of batteries using a silicon nanowire-graphite composite electrode were produced by Amprius in 2014, which claims to have sold several hundred thousand of these batteries as of 2014.

In 2016, Stanford University researchers presented a method of encapsulating silicon microparticles in a graphene shell, which confines fractured particles and also acts as a stable solid electrolyte interphase layer. These microparticles reached an energy density of 3,300 mAh/g.

As of 2018, products by startups Sila Nanotechnologies, Global Graphene Group, Enovix, Enevate, Group14 Technologies, Paraclete Energy, and others were undergoing tests by battery manufacturers, car companies, and consumer-electronics companies. BMW announced plans to incorporate Sila technology by 2023 and increase battery-pack capacity by 10–15%. As of 2021, Enovix was the first company to ship finished silicon anode batteries to end customers. In September 2021, Sila announced that it had begun shipping its first product and that it had been incorporated in Whoop 4.0.

Group14 Technologies has patented a silicon-carbon composite SCC55, which enables 50% more in fully lithiated volumetric energy density than graphite used in conventional lithium-ion battery anodes. SCC55 has been tested and validated by battery manufacturers Farasis and StoreDot, the latter of which found that SCC55 could be charged to 80% capacity in 10 minutes. In May 2022, Porsche AG announced plans to produce lithium-silicon battery cells with Group14's technology in Germany in 2024 to help power their new electric vehicles. Group14 plans to use Porsche's funding to accelerate the development of their second U.S. factory to supply a minimum of 600,000 EVs annually. In January 2024, Group14 announced that through its partnership with Amperex Technology Limited, they had over 1 million smartphones in China (Honor) using its technology.

In 2015, Tesla CEO Elon Musk claimed that silicon in Model S batteries increased the car's range by 6%. On September 22, 2020, Tesla revealed its plans for gradually increasing the amounts of silicon in its future batteries, focusing on the anodes. Tesla's approach is to encapsulate the silicon particles with an elastic, ion-permeable coating. In this way, the silicon-swelling concern is accommodated, thereby enabling the desired increase in battery capacity to be achieved. Overall battery life expectancy is expected to remain unimpacted by this change. The reason for the gradual (instead of sudden) increases in silicon usage is to enable testing and confirmation of the stepwise changes.

Alternatively, a study has shown the possibility of increasing the silicon oxide content to 90% using graphene nanotubes, also known as single-wall carbon nanotubes, which create long, flexible, conductive, strong nanobridges between silicon particles and hold them together during charge/discharge cycles.

=== Use ===
On June 29, 2026, Chinese Honor released the X80 Pro Max mobile phone with a Si/C Li-Po 11000 mAh battery and a near-normal weight of 203 g (7.16 oz).

== Specific capacity ==
A crystalline silicon anode has a theoretical specific capacity of 3600 mAh/g, approximately ten times that of commonly used graphite anodes (limited to 372 mAh/g). Each silicon atom can bind up to 3.75 lithium atoms in its fully lithiated and metastable state (Li_{3.75}Si), or up to 4.4 lithium atoms in its fully lithiated ultimate maximum capacity. This is compared to 1 Li atom to 6 C atoms for the fully lithiated graphite (LiC_{6}).

Specific capacity and volume change for some anode materials (given in their lithiated state).
Anode material	Specific capacity (mAh/g)	Volume change
Li (pure metal anode)	3862	-
LiC_{6} (commonly used today)	372	10%
Li_{22}Sn_{5}	990	252%
Li_{9}Al_{4}	2235	178%
Li_{15}Si_{4}	3600	320%
Li_{22}Si_{5}	4200	300-400 %

== Silicon swelling ==
The lattice distance between silicon atoms multiplies as it accommodates lithium ions (lithiation), reaching 320% of the original volume. The expansion causes large anisotropic stresses to occur within the electrode material, fracturing and crumbling the silicon material and detachment from the current collector. Prototypical lithium-silicon batteries lose most of their capacity in as few as 10 charge-discharge cycles. A solution to the capacity and stability issues posed by the significant volume expansion upon lithiation is critical to the success of silicon anodes.

Because the volume expansion and contraction properties of nanoparticles differ greatly from the bulk material, silicon nanostructures have been investigated as a potential solution. While they have a higher percentage of surface atoms than bulk silicon particles, the increased reactivity may be controlled by encasement, coatings, or other methods that limit surface—electrolyte contact. One method identified by researchers has used silicon nanowires on a conductive substrate for an anode, and found that the nanowire morphology creates direct current pathways to help increase power density and decreases disruption from volume change. However, the large volume change of the nanowires can still pose a fading problem.

Other studies examined the potential of silicon nanoparticles. Anodes that use silicon nanoparticles may overcome the price and scale barriers of nanowire batteries, while offering more mechanical stability over cycling compared to other silicon electrodes. Typically, these anodes add carbon as a conductive additive and a binder for increased mechanical stability. However, this geometry does not fully solve the issue of large volume expansion upon lithiation, exposing the battery to increased risk of capacity loss from inaccessible nanoparticles after cycle-induced cracking and stress.

Another nanoparticle approach is to use a conducting polymer matrix as both the binder and the polymer electrolyte for nanoparticle batteries. One study examined a three-dimensional conducting polymer and hydrogel network to encase and allow for ionic transport to the electrochemically active silicon nanoparticles. The framework resulted in a marked improvement in electrode stability, with over 90% capacity retention after 5,000 cycles. Other methods to accomplish similar outcomes include utilizing slurry coating techniques, which are inline with presently used electrode creation methodologies.

=== Self-healing polymer binders for silicon anodes ===
In 2013, Stanford researchers developed a self-healing polymer binder to improve the cycling stability of silicon microparticle (SiMP) anodes in lithium-ion batteries. Silicon, with a theoretical specific capacity of ~3,600 mAh/g — nearly 10 times that of graphite — suffers from rapid capacity loss due to ~300% volumetric expansion during lithiation, causing electrode cracking and electrical disconnection.

The binder, a randomly branched hydrogen-bonding polymer, autonomously repairs cracks formed during cycling, maintaining mechanical and electrical integrity. This approach enabled SiMP anodes to achieve a cycle life over 90 cycles at 80% capacity retention — more than 10 times longer than conventional polyvinylidene fluoride (PVDF) binders, which drop below 80% capacity within 9 cycles. The self-healing electrode maintained a high specific capacity of ~3,000 mAh/g and demonstrated stable Coulombic efficiency above 98% after initial cycles, marking advancements toward scalable, high-energy, long-lifetime battery technology using silicon-based anodes in combination with self-healing polymers.

== Charged silicon reactivity ==
Besides the well recognized problems associated with large volume expansion, for example cracking the SEI layer, a second well recognized issue involves the reactivity of the charged materials. Since charged silicon is a lithium silicide, its salt-like structure is built from a combination of silicon (-4) Zintl anions and lithium cations. These silicide anions are highly reduced and display high reactivity with the electrolyte components that is charge compensated locally by reduction of the solvents. Recent work by Han, et al., has identified an in-situ coating synthesis method that eliminates the redox activity of the surface and limits the reactions that can take place with the solvents. Although it does not affect the issues associated with volume expansion, it has been seen with Mg cation based coatings to increase the cycle life and capacity significantly in a manner similar to the film forming additive fluoroethylene carbonate (FEC).

== Solid electrolyte interphase layer ==
SEI layer formation on silicon. In green on the left, the normal battery operation, in blue the SEI layer formation. The electrolyte decomposes by reduction.

Starting from the first cycle of lithium-ion battery operation, the electrolyte decomposes to form lithium compounds on the anode surface, producing a layer called the solid electrolyte interface (SEI). For both silicon and graphite anodes, this SEI layer is the result of the reduction potential of the anode. During cycling, electrons flow in and out of the anode through its current collector. Due to the strong voltages present during anode operation, these electrons will decompose the electrolyte molecules at the anode surface. The properties and evolution of the SEI fundamentally affect the overall battery performance through various mechanisms. Since the SEI layer contains numerous lithium compounds, the production of the SEI reduces the total charge capacity of the battery by consuming some of the lithium that would otherwise be used to store charge. This degradation mechanism is known as loss of lithium inventory (LLI). Furthermore, the SEI's lithium permeability affects the amount of lithium that the anode can store, while the SEI's electronic resistivity determines how fast the SEI grows (the more electronically conductive, the more the electrolyte will be reduced and the faster the SEI will grow). When using lithium hexafluorophosphate (LiPF_{6}) salts dissolved in a carbonate solvent, one of the most frequently used electrolyte compositions, SEI formation can also be caused by chemical reactions between the electrolyte and trace amounts of water, producing hydrofluoric acid (HF) that further reduces performance. In a lithium-silicon battery, the SEI plays an especially important role in capacity degradation, due to the large volumetric changes during cycling. Expansion and contraction of the anode material cracks the SEI layer that has formed on top of it, exposing more of the anode material to direct contact with the electrolyte, which results in further SEI production and LLI-based degradation.

Understanding the structure and composition of the SEI layer throughout cycling is critical for improving SEI stability and therefore improving battery performance. However, the composition of the SEI is not fully understood, both for graphitic and silicon-based anodes. Computational methods have been used to explore the vast numbers of SEI compounds and reactions to better understand how SEI development progresses . For graphitic anodes in an LiPF6 and ethylene carbonate (EC) electrolyte, Heiskanen et al. identified three distinct phases of SEI formation. First, the reduction of LiPF6 and EC respectively result in an SEI that is mostly lithium fluoride (LiF) and lithium ethylene dicarbonate (LEDC). Subsequently, the LEDC decomposes into a variety of components, which can be solid, gaseous, soluble in the electrolyte, or insoluble. The formation of gases and electrolytically soluble molecules results in the SEI layer becoming more porous, since these species diffuse away from the anode surface. This SEI porosity exposes the electrolyte to the anode surface, which results in the formation of more LEDC and LiF on the exterior of the SEI layer. Overall, these mechanisms result in the formation of an inner SEI layer that mostly contains the electrolytically insoluble compounds, and an exterior SEI consisting of the LEDC and LiF that form from electrolyte reduction. In a silicon-anode battery, a similar two-layer SEI structure also results, with inorganic compounds (lithium fluoride, lithium oxide, lithium carbonate, etc.) forming an inner layer and organic compounds forming an outer layer.

Since the SEI is formed from the electrolyte, adjusting the electrolyte composition can have large effects on the capacity retention of lithium-silicon batteries. As a result, a wide variety of electrolyte additives have been tested and found to provide capacity improvements, such as silane molecules, succinic anhydride, citric acid, ethers, and additional carbonates (such as fluoroethylene carbonate and vinylene carbonate). These additives have the potential to improve performance through multiple mechanisms. For example, vinylene carbonate and fluoroethylene carbonate have both been reported to improve the SEI layer's ability to block the electrolyte from interacting with the anode surface, potentially by increasing the SEI density. Another potential mechanism is highlighted by silane, which can form Si-O networks on the surface of the anode that stabilizes the organic SEI layer deposited on top of it.

== See also ==
- Nanowire battery
- Research in lithium-ion batteries
- Solid-state battery
  - Solid-state silicon battery
