= Huang Shilin =

Chinese billionaire businessman

- Born: 1967 (age 58–59)
- Education: Hefei University of Technology (B.Tech)
- Occupation: Businessman

Huang Shilin (Chinese: 黄世林; born 1967) is a Chinese billionaire businessman, and the vice chairman of Contemporary Amperex Technology (CATL), the world's largest battery supplier for the electric vehicle industry. As of 2018, Huang owned a 12% stake within the company. Shilin earned a BTech degree in engineering from the Hefei University of Technology.

Huang earned a spot on the 2026 Bloomberg Billionaires Index and Forbes Billionaires List with an estimated wealth of $30.6 billion.
