= CATL =

Chinese battery manufacturer

Contemporary Amperex Technology Co., Limited

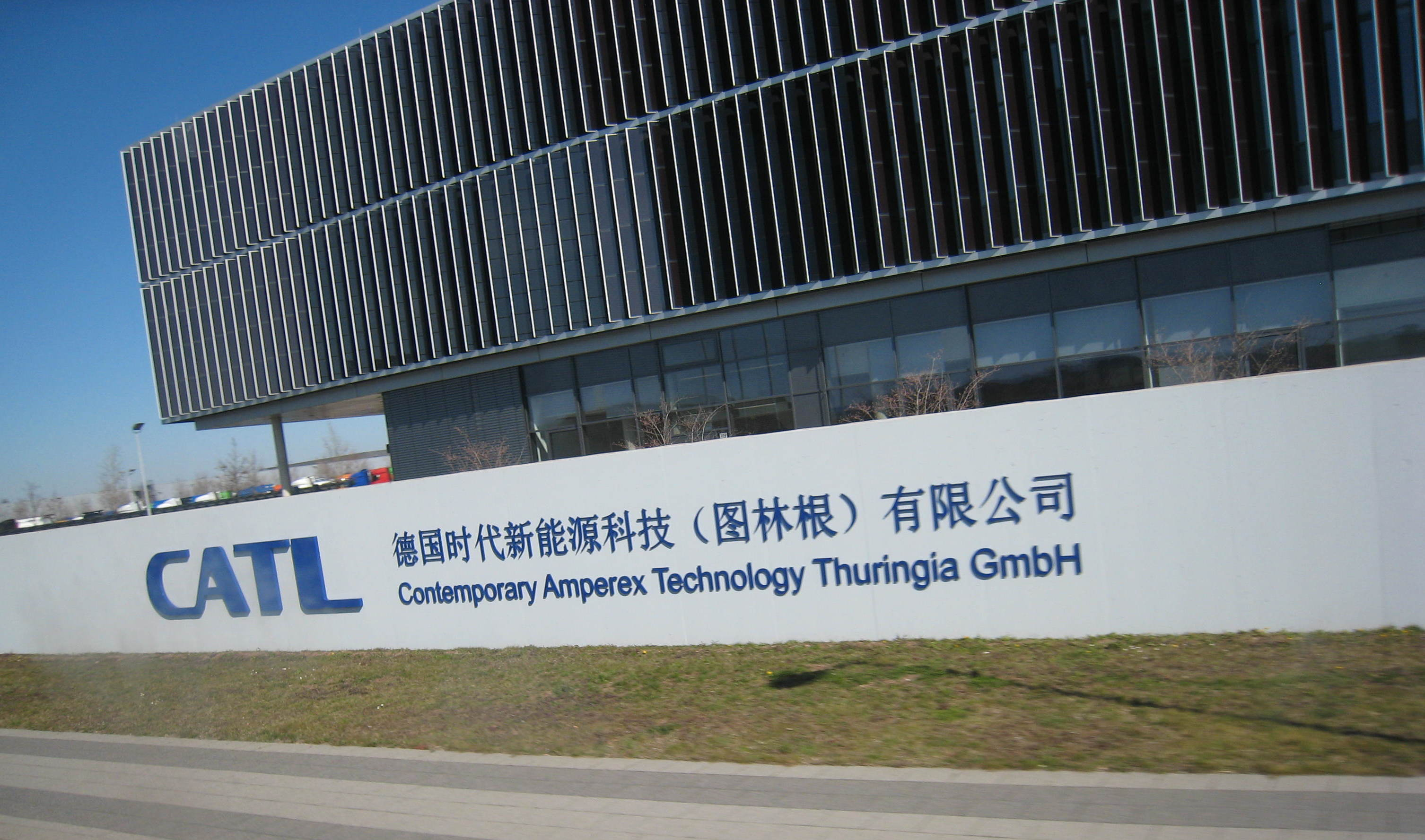
- CATL facility in Arnstadt, Germany, one of 15 facilities worldwide.
- Native name: 宁德时代新能源科技股份有限公司
- Type: Public
- Traded as: SZSE: 300750; SEHK: 3750; CSI A50 Compnent
- Industry: Electric battery
- Founded: 2011; 15 years ago
- Founder: Robin Zeng
- Headquarters: Ningde, Fujian, China
- Key people: Robin Zeng (Chair)
- Revenue: ▲423.7 billion yuan (61.2B$)(2025)
- Net income: ▲72.2 billion yuan (10.4B$)(2025)
- Total assets: ▲US$ 113.0 billion (2025)
- Number of employees: 131,988 (2025)
- Website: www.catl.com

Contemporary Amperex Technology Co., Limited, (CATL) is a Chinese battery manufacturer and technology company founded in 2011 that specializes in the manufacturing of lithium-ion batteries for electric vehicles and energy storage systems, as well as battery management systems (BMS). CATL is the biggest EV and energy storage battery manufacturer in the world, with a global market share of around 37% and 36.8% in 2022 and 2023, respectively. It is headquartered in Ningde, Fujian province, where it maintains its flagship manufacturing hub.

== History ==
CATL was founded in Ningde, which is reflected in its Chinese name (宁德时代 'Ningde era'). The company started as a spin-off of Amperex Technology Limited (ATL), a previous business founded by Robin Zeng in 1999. ATL initially manufactured batteries for portable devices based on licensed technology. In 2005, ATL was acquired by Japan's TDK company, but Zeng continued as a manager for ATL.

While the Chinese government started subsidizing EVs in 2009, ATL had set up an R&D division for EV batteries. In 2011, A group of Chinese investors, led by Zeng and vice-chairman Huang Shilin, spun off the EV battery operations of ATL into the new company CATL after acquiring an 85% stake. Former parent TDK retained its 15% stake in CATL until 2015. Zeng has applied management styles of TDK and Huawei to his company.

=== 2011–2021 ===
Amid the rise of electric vehicles, CATL gradually became one of the world's leading battery providers due to its early investments in EV battery technologies and government subsidies for the battery industry. In 2011, China required foreign automakers to transfer crucial technology to domestic companies in order to receive subsidies for electric vehicles. In 2012, CATL established cooperation with BMW Brilliance, its first main customer. China's dominant position in the battery manufacturing supply chain, including the control over rare-earth materials, provided an ideal foundation for Chinese companies like CATL to decouple from the monopoly of Western technology. It started to provide components to the supply chains of European and American vehicle manufacturers amidst competition from Panasonic and LG Chem.

In 2016, CATL was the world's third largest provider of EV, HEV and PHEV batteries, behind Panasonic (Sanyo) and BYD. In 2017, CATL's sales of power battery system reached 11.84GWh, taking the lead worldwide for the first time.

In January 2017, CATL announced a strategic partnership with Valmet Automotive, focusing on project management, engineering and battery pack supply. CATL acquired a 22% stake in Valmet Automotive.

In June 2018, CATL went public on the Shenzhen Stock Exchange.

BMW announced in 2018 that it would buy €4 billion worth of batteries from CATL for use in the electric Mini and iNext vehicles. In the same year, CATL announced that it would establish a new battery factory in Arnstadt, Thuringia, Germany.

In June 2020, CATL director Robin Zeng announced that the company had achieved a battery for electric vehicles (EVs) rated as good for 1 million miles (or 1.6 million kilometers).

In 2021, the company unveiled a sodium-ion battery for the automotive market. A battery recycling facility is planned to recover some of the materials. CATL continued to invest in cobalt batteries as well, and acquired a near 25% stake in the Democratic Republic of Congo's Kisanfu cobalt mine, one of the world's largest sources of cobalt.

=== 2022–present ===
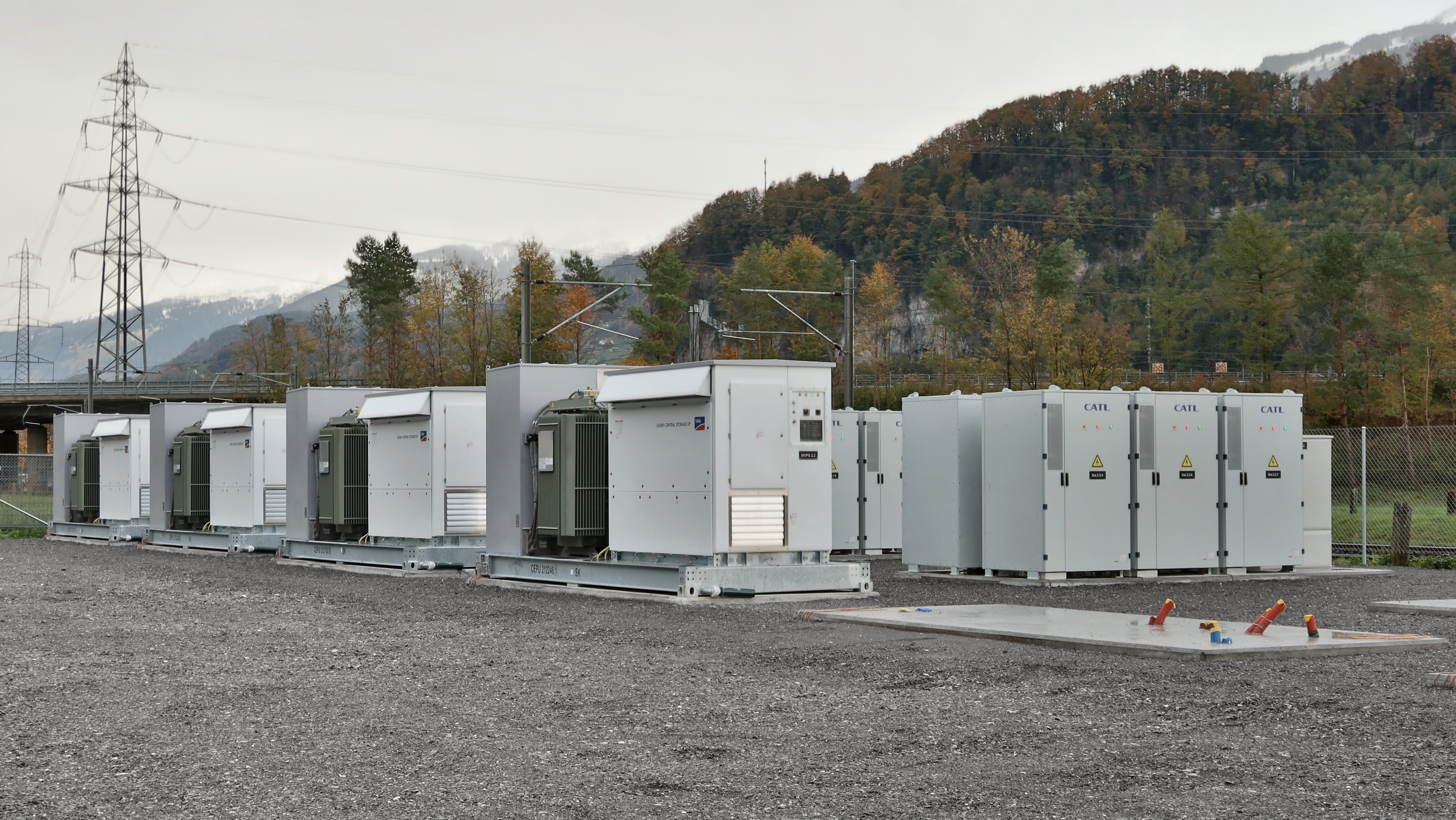
Battery storage system installed at a utility in Switzerland.

In the first half, CATL ranked first in the world with a market share of 34 percent, according to SNE research. CATL announced plans to establish a battery factory in Debrecen, Hungary. Their Yibin manufacturing plant was certified as the world's first zero-carbon battery factory.

In July 2022, Ford announced buying batteries from CATL for use in the Ford Mustang Mach-E and Ford F-150 Lightning models, which subsequently raised concerns with the United States House Select Committee on Strategic Competition between the United States and the Chinese Communist Party. In October, CATL expanded its deal with VinFast to provide a skateboard chassis and "enhance global footprint".

On 12 August 2022, CATL announced its second European battery plant in Hungary.

In 2023, CATL received the equivalent of US$790 million in state subsidies. The same year, CATL introduced its M3P battery, offering a 15% increase in energy density, reaching 210 Wh/kg. The battery replaces the iron in the lithium iron phosphate battery with a combination of magnesium, zinc, and aluminium.

Later that year, the company announced its Shenxing LFP battery. The cathode of Shenxing LFP is fully nano-crystallized, which accelerates ion movement and the response to charging signals. The anode's second-generation fast-ion ring technology increases the number of intercalation channels and shortens the intercalation distance. Its superconducting electrolyte formula reduces viscosity and improves conductivity. A new separator film reduces resistance. At room temperature, Shenxing can charge from 0 to 80% in 10 minutes and in just 30 minutes at -10 °C, maintaining 0-100 kph at low temperatures. Safety is enhanced by using a safe coating for the electrolyte and the separator. A real-time fault-testing system enables safe, fast refuelling. Ford announced a 2,500-worker battery plant in Marshall, Michigan using CATL technology. The facility would be a Ford subsidiary. Producing the batteries domestically would enable Ford customers to access federal subsidies. The project was paused after lawmakers questioned the tax subsidies.

In November 2023, CATL and Stellantis announced that they are considering a joint investment in the form of a joint venture with equivalent contributions.

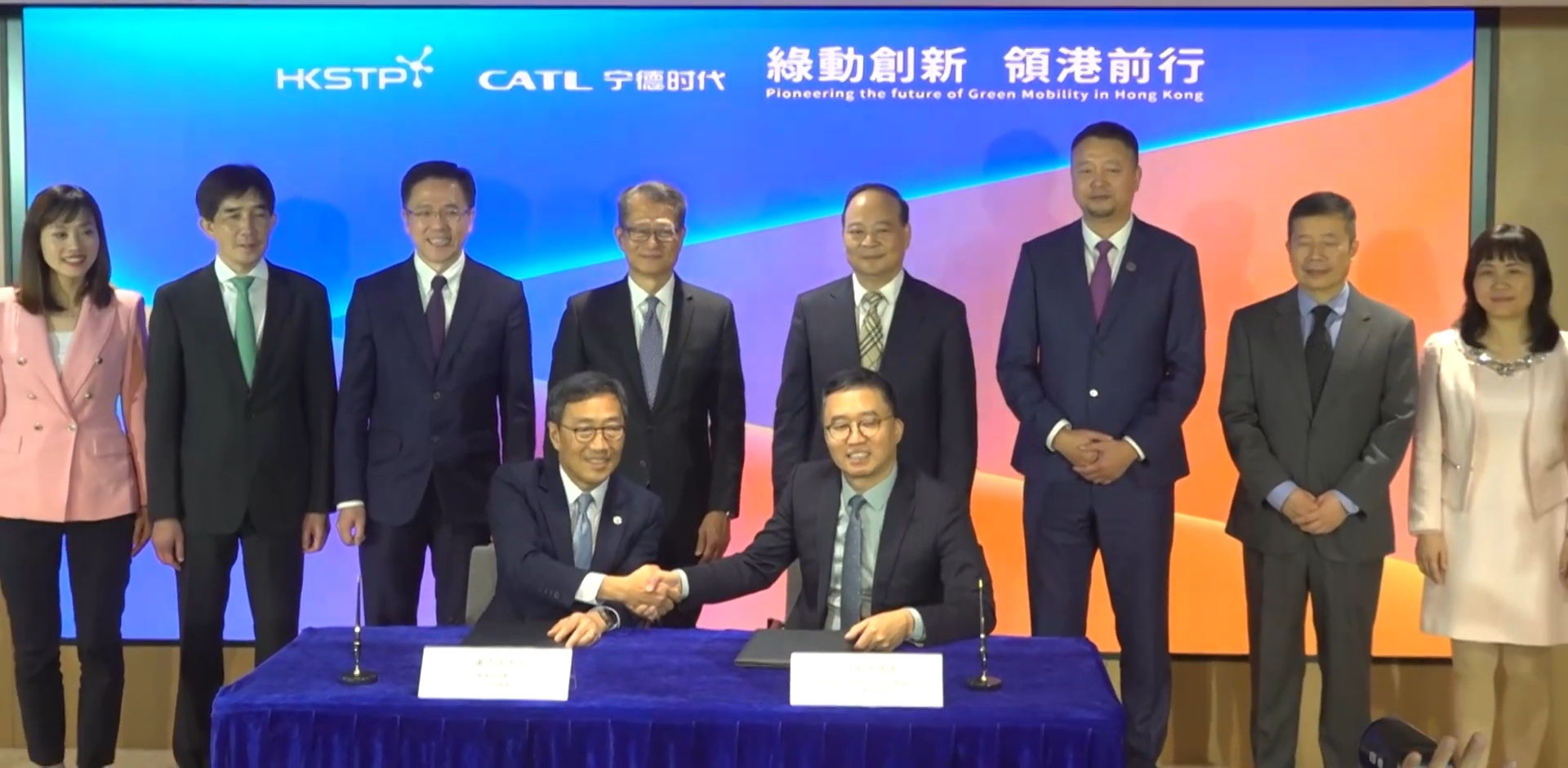
CATL signs MoU with HKSTP

On 7 December 2023, CATL and Hong Kong Science and Technology Parks Corporation (HKSTP) signed a memorandum of understanding to establish a CATL research center at the HKSTP with an investment of over HKD 1.2 billion.

In 2023, the World Intellectual Property Organization (WIPO)’s Annual PCT Review ranked CATL's number of patent applications published under the PCT System as 8th in the world, with 1,799 patent applications being published during 2023.

In April 2024, CATL announced Tener, a large-scale stationary energy storage system. It is claimed to feature all-round safety, zero degradation over five years and 6.25 MWh capacity per unit. It incorporates biomimetic SEI (solid electrolyte interphase) and self-assembled electrolyte technologies.

In August 2024, American legislators Marco Rubio and John Moolenaar asked Defense Secretary Lloyd Austin to add CATL to a list of companies prohibited from receiving U.S. military contracts.

As of September 2024, CATL is the top recipient of Chinese corporate subsidies, a position it has maintained since 2023.

In December 2024, CATL announced to its suppliers that it is willing to provide financial support to accelerate technological innovation in battery materials and equipment. On 12 December 2024, it was reported that CATL will collaborate with Stellantis in a joint-venture to build a large-scale lithium iron phosphate battery plant in Zaragoza, an investment worth €4.1 billion. This 50-50 partnership is anticipated to commence battery production in 2026 and will have a capacity reaching 50 GWh.

On 7 January 2025, the US Department of Defense added CATL and Tencent to its list of "Chinese military companies".

On 11 February 2025, CATL filed for a secondary listing on the Hong Kong Stock Exchange, aiming to raise over $5 billion to fund international expansion plans including projects in Hungary, Spain, and Indonesia. Cornerstone investors included Sinopec, the Kuwait Investment Authority, Hillhouse Investment, Oaktree Capital Management and an Agnelli family investment fund.

== Corporate affairs ==
With financial years ending 31 December, CATL key trends are:

Year	Revenue (USD billion)	EBITA (USD billion)	Total assets (USD billion)
2017	3.01	0.57	7.63
2018	4.39	0.64	10.74
2019	6.60	0.87	14.51
2020	7.40	1.12	24.05
2021	20.24	3.26	48.28
2022	48.08	5.65	87.13
2023	56.52	8.09	101.45
2024	50.29	9.31	107.78

== Facilities ==
CATL operates fifteen battery manufacturing plants worldwide, in five countries: China (Guiyang, Jining, Liyang, Luoyang, Ningde, Nanhui New City, Xiamen, Xining, Yibin, Yichun, Zhaoqing), Germany (Arnstadt), Hungary (Debrecen), Indonesia (Karawang), and Spain (Figueruelas).

== Partnerships ==
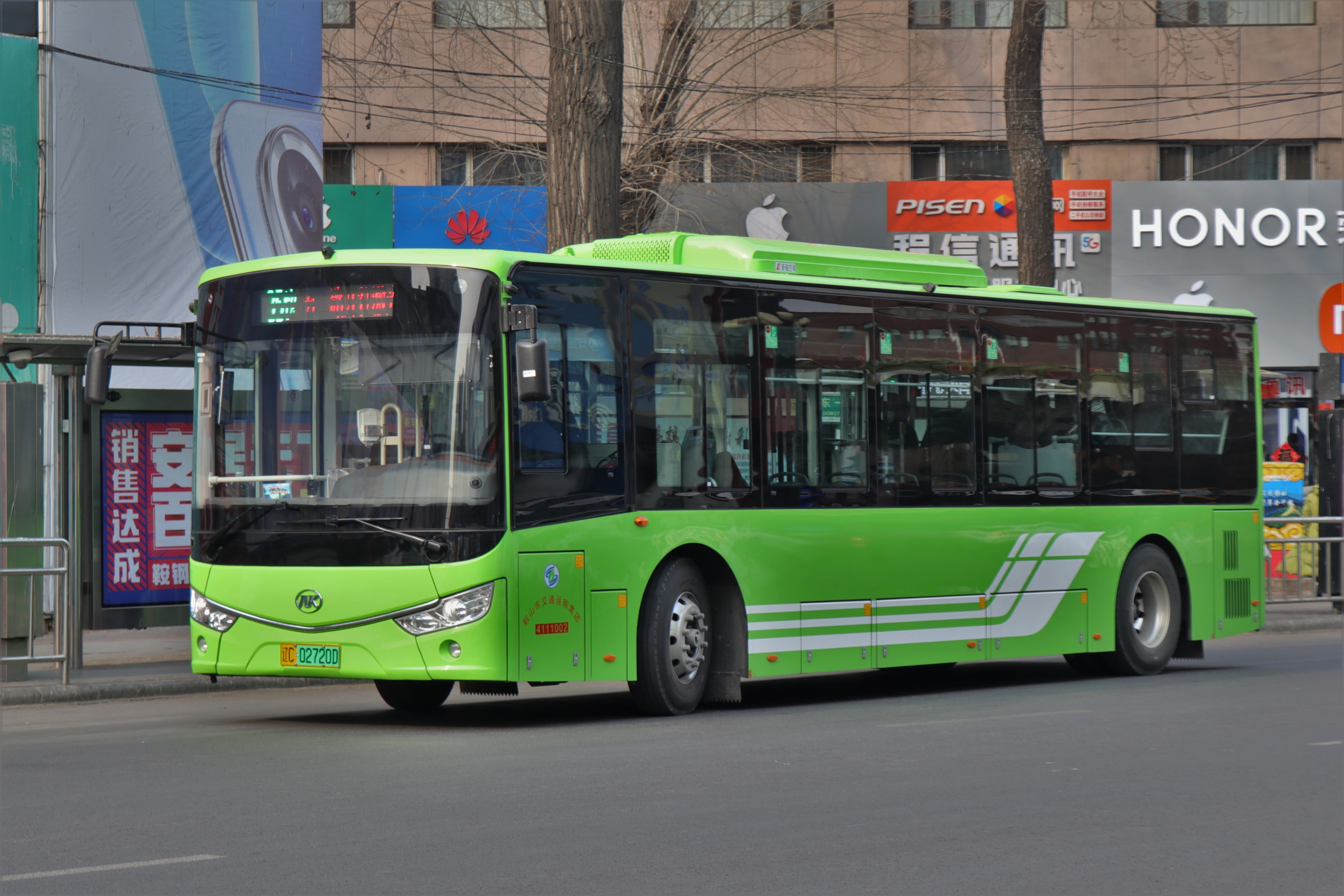
Battery electric bus with CATL batteries.

While its main competitor BYD has prioritized battery supply to its own vehicles, CATL has developed partnerships with multiple automakers. CATL batteries are used by BMW, Daimler AG, Ford, Hyundai, Honda, PSA, Tesla, Toyota, Volkswagen and Volvo.

In China, its clients include BAIC Motor, Geely, GAC Group, Yutong Bus, Zhongtong Bus, Xiamen King Long, SAIC Motor, Foton Motor, Li Auto, Nio and XPeng.

CATL also partners with Valmet Automotive, VinFast, and Hong Kong Science and Technology Parks Corporation.

In August 2022, CATL and truck maker FAW Jiefang established a joint venture to develop battery technology (urban battery replacement station networks).

== Assessment ==
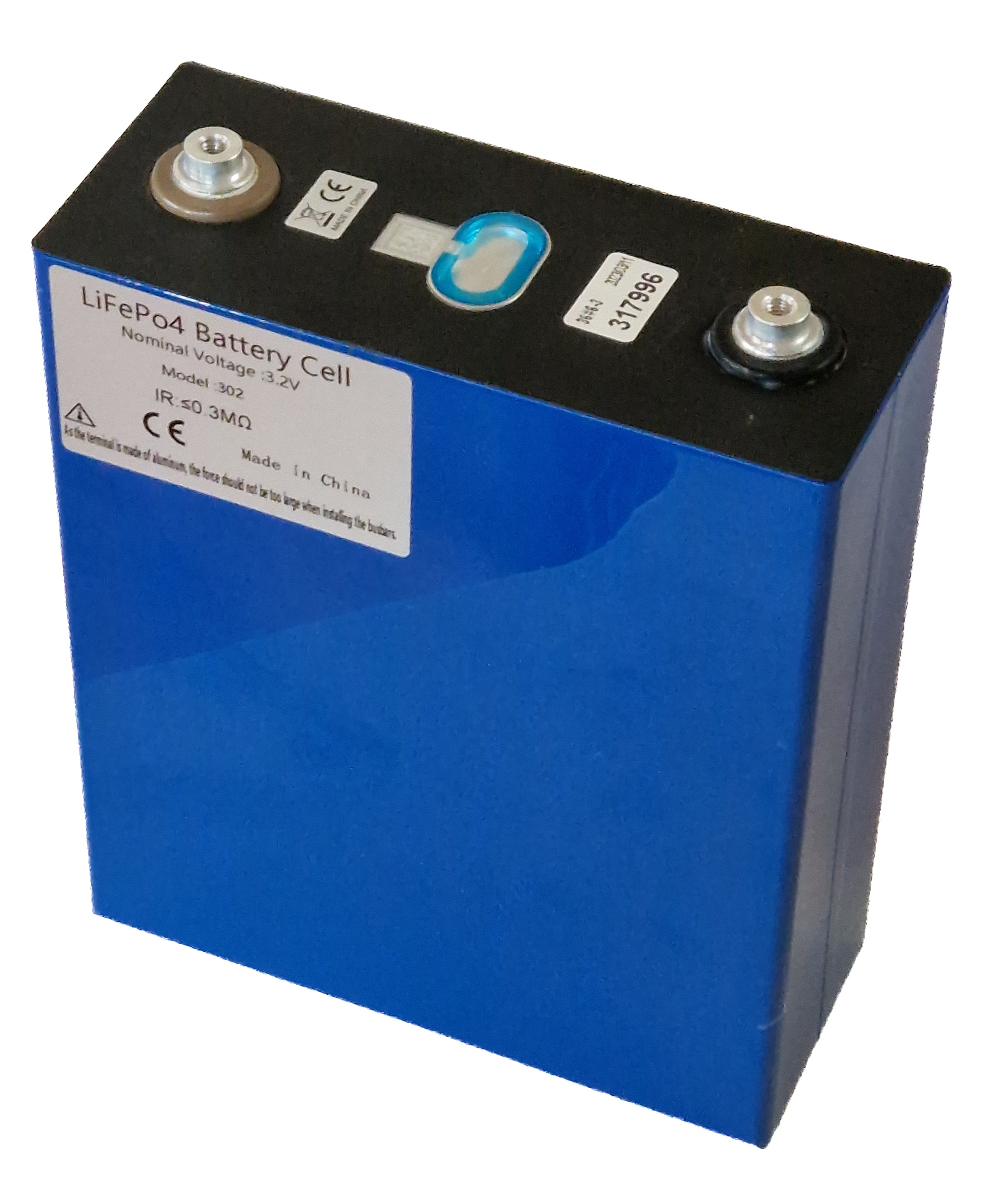
CATL LiFePO4 302Ah battery cell

According to former Tesla battery supply chain manager Vivas Kumar in 2019, CATL "are seen as the leader of lithium iron phosphate battery (LFP battery) technology". The company employs the cell-to-pack method to reduce the inactive weight of its batteries. It increases volume utilization rate by 15% to 20%, doubles the production efficiency and reduces the number of parts for a battery pack by 40%, while the energy density of a battery pack jumps from 140 to 150 Wh/Kg to 200 Wh/Kg.

According to Kumar, unlike competitors such as LG Energy Solution or SK Innovation, CATL is more willing to adopt external technology rather than relying on a fully in-house design.

In 2024, Tu Le of consultancy Sino Auto Insights claimed that the US was "years behind" China in batteries, and that "if the US is going to be competitive on the global stage with EVs, through 2030 they’re going to have to use Chinese batteries".

CATL has been credited with transforming Ningde, where it maintains its headquarters and main manufacturing hub, from one of the most impoverished cities in eastern China to a well-known industrial center. From 2012 to 2021, Ningde's gross domestic product (GDP) nearly tripled, with CATL being the city's largest local taxpayer and employer. However, the city is considered to be less desirable and a relative backwater to prominent tier 1 cities like Shenzhen and Shanghai, resulting in difficulties for CATL in attracting talent.

== Products ==
=== Batteries ===
- Qilin (麒麟)
- Shenxing (神行)
  - Shenxing PLUS
- Xiaoyao (骁遥)
  - Xiaoyao EREV Hybrid
  - Xiaoyao Dual-core

== US security allegations ==
In December 2023, Duke Energy disconnected CATL batteries from Marine Corps Base Camp Lejeune due to security concerns. CATL called accusations about its batteries posing espionage threats "false and misleading." The National Defense Authorization Act for Fiscal Year 2024 prohibited US defense funding for CATL products.

In June 2024, a group of U.S. lawmakers asked the United States Department of Homeland Security to add CATL to an import ban list under the Uyghur Forced Labor Prevention Act. CATL said in a statement that the allegations against it were "groundless and completely false" and that it was in compliance with applicable laws and regulations. In April 2025, the United States House Select Committee on Strategic Competition between the United States and the Chinese Communist Party asked JPMorgan Chase and Bank of America to withdraw from working on CATL's Hong Kong IPO. In July 2025, the same committee issued subpoenas to the banks. In January 2026, Texas governor Greg Abbott prohibited CATL products on all government devices and networks, citing security concerns.

== See also ==
- List of electric-vehicle-battery manufacturers
