= Li L7 =

Range-extender mid-size luxury crossover SUV

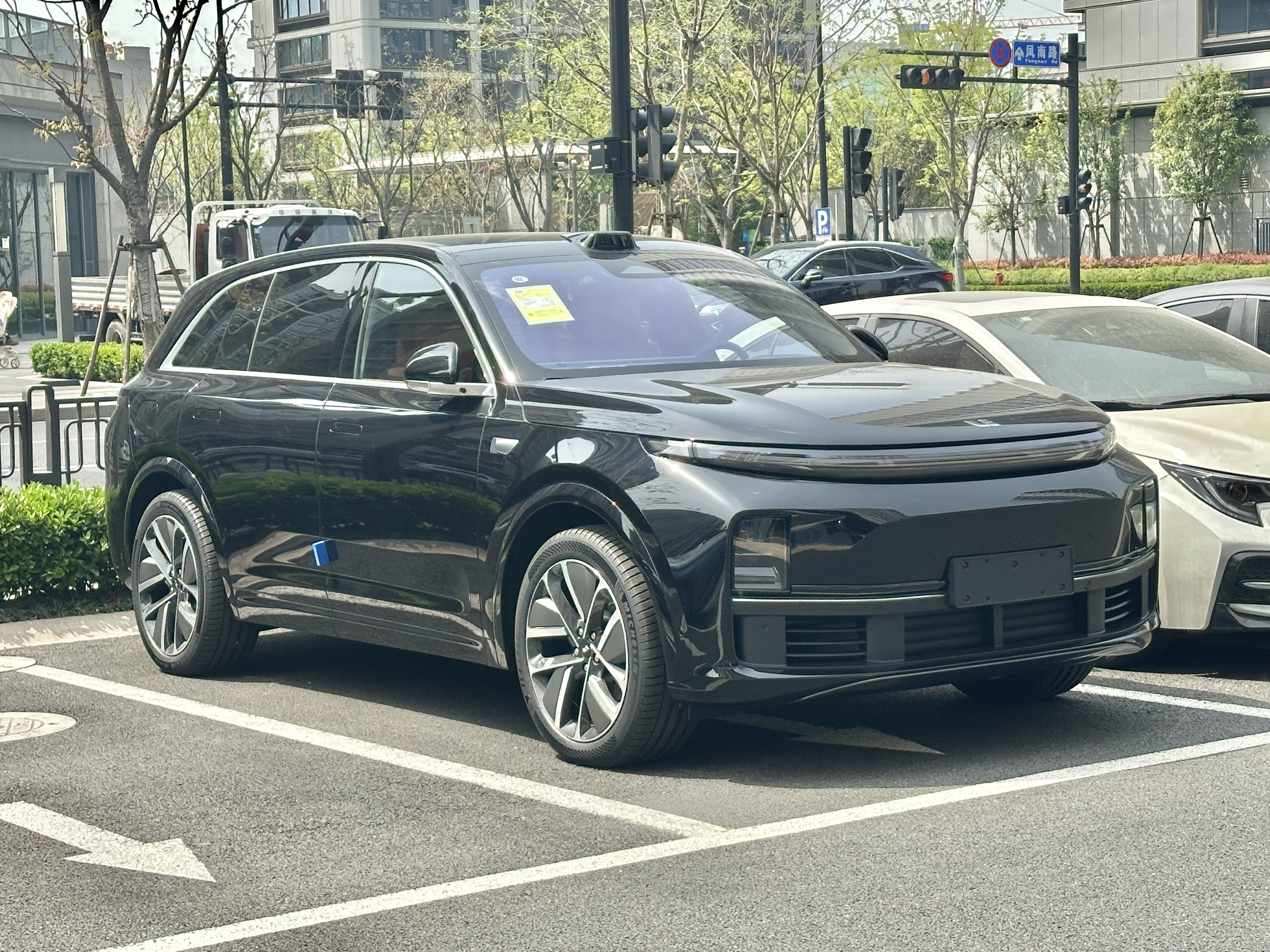

Overview
- Manufacturer: Li Auto
- Model code: X03
- Also called: Lixiang L7
- Production: 2023–2026 (China); 2025–present (export)
- Assembly: China: Changzhou, Jiangsu
- Designer: Ben Baum

Body and chassis
- Class: Mid-size luxury crossover SUV
- Body style: 5-door SUV
- Layout: Front-engine, dual-motor, all-wheel drive
- Related: Li L6; Li L8; Li L9

Powertrain
- Engine: Petrol range extender: 1.5 L L2E15M I4 turbo
- Electric motor: Permanent magnet synchronous
- Power output: 330 kW (443 hp; 449 PS)
- Hybrid drivetrain: Range extender series hybrid
- Battery: 40.9 kWh NMC; 42.8 kWh NMC Sunwoda/SVOLT; 52.3 kWh NMC CATL
- Range: 1,100 km (680 mi)
- Electric range: 170–240 km (110–150 mi) (WLTP)
- Plug-in charging: 75-90 kW DC

Dimensions
- Wheelbase: 3,005 mm (118.3 in)
- Length: 5,050 mm (198.8 in)
- Width: 1,995 mm (78.5 in)
- Height: 1,750 mm (68.9 in)
- Curb weight: 2,450–2,500 kg (5,400–5,510 lb)

The Li L7 (Chinese: 理想L7; pinyin: Lǐxiǎng L7; lit. 'ideal L7') is a range-extender luxury mid-size crossover SUV produced by Chinese manufacturer Li Auto. It is the fourth vehicle from the manufacturer, and also the third L-series model, a series of electric SUVs with a petrol engine acting as a range extender, which includes the similar L9, L8 and L6.

== History ==
The Li L7 was presented in September 2022, at that time as the company's least expensive and smallest model, while sharing the same wheelbase with the longer Li L8. During its introduction, the Li L7 was available in three trims: Air, Pro, and Max. Since 2024, the Ultra trim level became available. Deliveries of the L7 Pro and L7 Max began on March 1, while deliveries of the base L7 Air started in early April 2023.

=== Design and equipment ===
Similar to other Li L-series models, the Li L7 uses the "Future Avant-Garde" design language, while appearing lower and sleeker than the larger Li L8 and Li L9. It comes with optional 21-inch wheels.

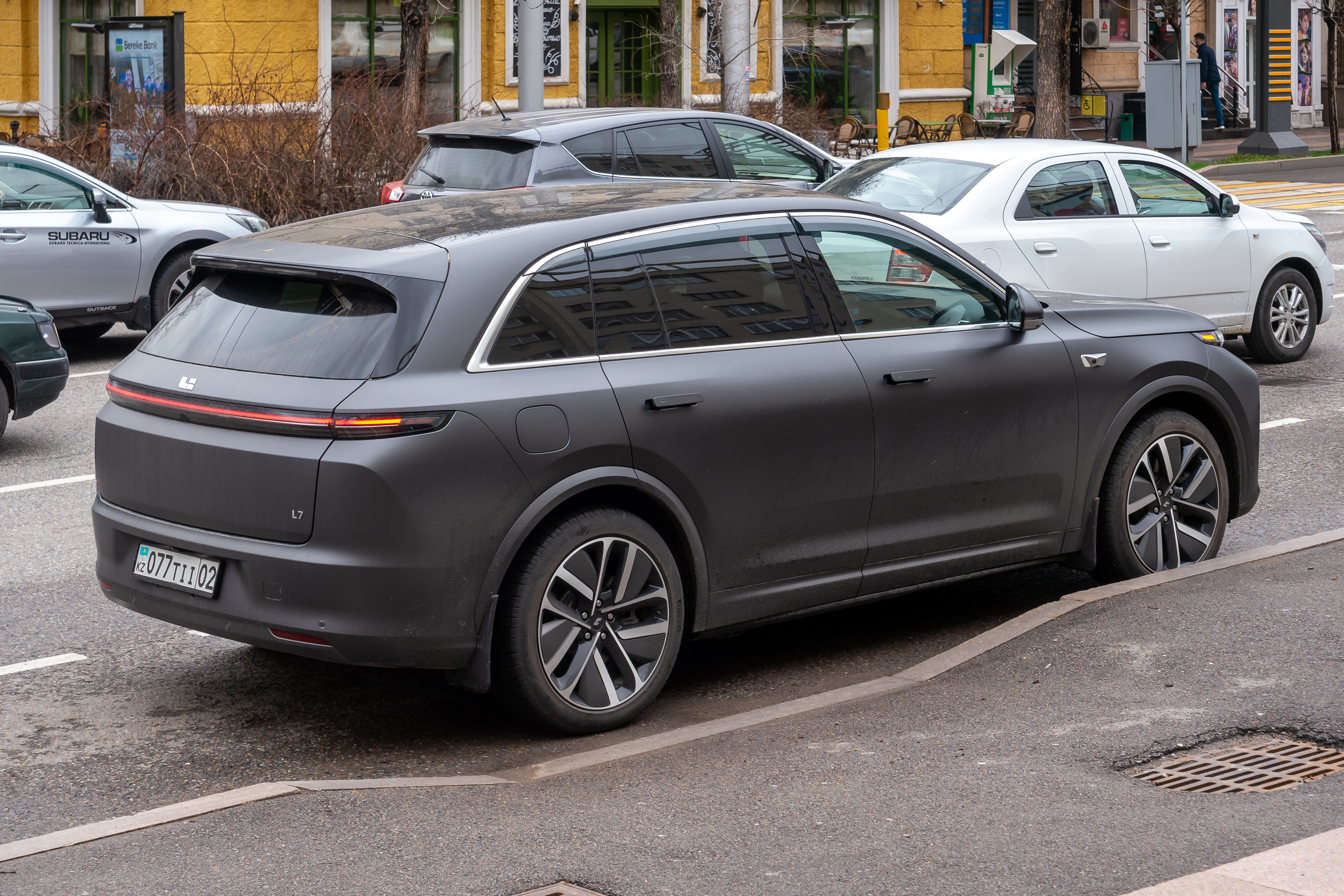
Rear view

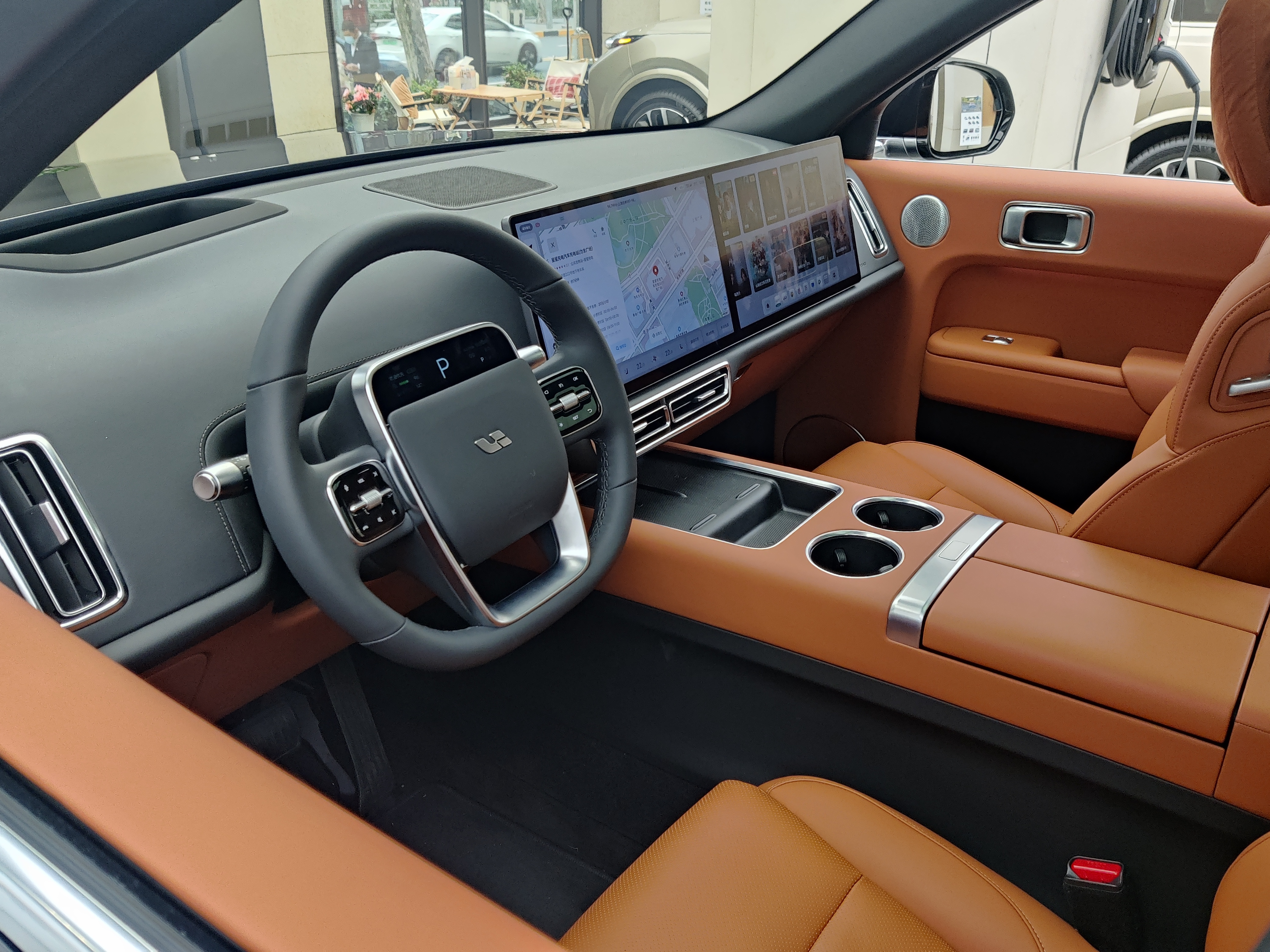
Interior

The L7 Pro, L7 Max and L7 Ultra (since 2024) feature an air suspension system marketed as Li Magic Carpet with five adjustable heights and three suspension modes: comfort, standard, and sport, while the L7 Air uses a simpler continuous damping control (CDC) suspension system.

For its advanced driver-assistance system, the L7 Air and L7 Pro are equipped with the Li AD Pro autonomous driving system with a Horizon Robotics Journey 5 chip with a computing power of 128 TOPS, while Li L7 Max uses the Li AD Max system with dual Orin-X chips (508 TOPS). Both systems feature an algorithm framework jointly developed by Li Auto, Tsinghua University, and MIT.

=== Interior ===
Unlike the L8 and L9, the Li L7 is a two-row, five-seater vehicle. It shares the same dashboard design with other L-series models. The model claims to offer a 1,160 mm (45.7 in) of maximum legroom and 985 mm (38.8 in) of headroom in the second row. The second-row seat includes a single electric footrest, an electric seatback adjustment with 25–40° recline angles, and a central armrest. A total of 26 storage spaces are available in the cabin. The cabin also supports a "Double Bed Mode" by removing headrests and enabling "Camping Mode".

Standard features across all trims include a panoramic sunroof with electric sunshade, double-layered heat-insulating windshield, independently controllable rear climate system, seat heating for all five seats, seat ventilation and lumbar massage for four seats, and 10 airbags, including rear seat side airbags.

The L7 Air and L7 Pro come standard with the SS Pro in-car entertainment system with a Qualcomm Snapdragon 8155 chip, while the L7 Max uses a more advanced SS Max system powered by dual Snapdragon 8155 chips. The system makes use of three 15.7-inch 3K LCD screens, two in the front and an optional one mounted on the celling, with anti-reflective and low blue light technology. It also has 21 speakers, a 1,920-watt amplifier, and a 7.3.4 Dolby Atmos surround sound system.

== Running changes ==
=== 2024 facelift ===
The Li L7 received an minor facelift and major updates in March 2024 for the 2024 model year. The Air, Pro and Max trim levels were revised to Pro, Max and Ultra. The L7 Ultra received a larger 52.3 kWh battery, increasing its electric range to 240 km (149 mi) under WLTC testing standards. The rear license plate mount, which was previously located at the rear bumper, was moved up to the tailgate after receiving feedback from customers. The 2024 model also comes with an in-car refrigerator, upgraded audio system, upgraded massage seat system, and the use of Qualcomm Snapdragon 8295P chip for the in-car entertainment system to replace the previous Qualcomm Snapdragon 8155.

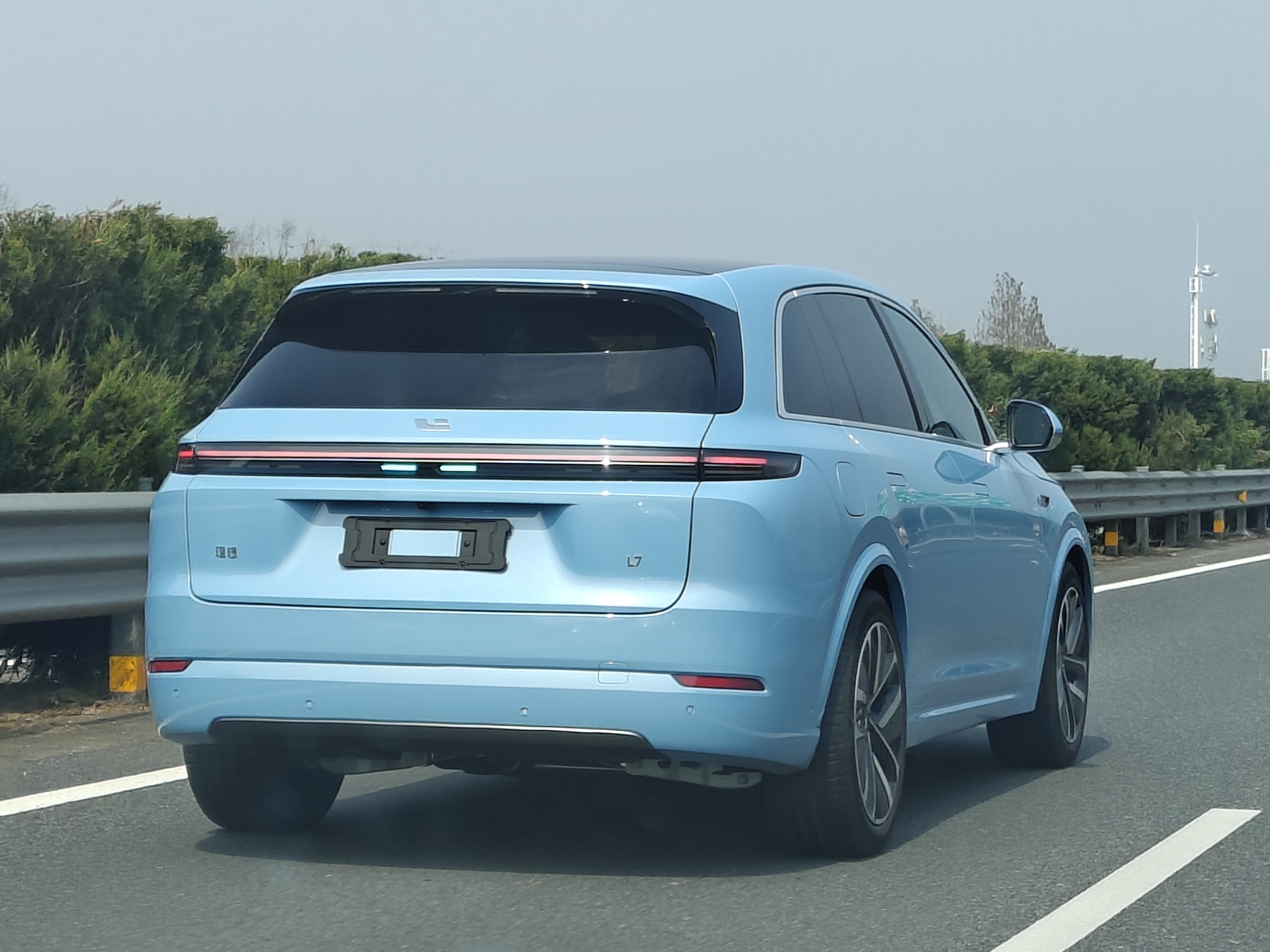
Li L7 2024 (facelift)

=== 2025 update ===
The 2025 update for the L7 was revealed on 8 May 2025, with pre-orders opening the same day and deliveries beginning the following week. The biggest change is to the ADAS system configurations, with all models now equipped with a new Hesai ATL LiDAR unit that is 60% smaller for lower drag and consumes 55% less power than the previous model, and has a detection range of up to 200 m (660 ft). The Pro model was upgraded to use a Horizon Robotics Journey 6M SoC capable of 128 TOPS and now has full capabilities, while the Max and Ultra models now use a single Nvidia Thor-U chip capable of 700 TOPS. Both are capable of running Li Auto's latest MindVLA ADAS software architecture. Li Auto says that the new system's auto emergency braking feature is capable of successfully braking for stopped traffic in unlit nighttime conditions at speeds up to 120 km/h (75 mph), and the auto emergency steering function can successfully avoid a child walking onto unlit nighttime roads from speeds up to 130 km/h (81 mph).

The air suspension has been upgraded from a single-chamber to a dual-chamber system, allowing for a 30% stiffer spring rate, resulting in 20% reduction in body roll, 11% and 26% reduced pitch under acceleration and braking respectively, and a higher moose test rating of 79.47 km/h (49 mph). The Max trim now receives the larger 52.3 kWh battery pack and associated increased range, leaving the Pro as the only remaining variant using the smaller 42.8 kWh pack. The exterior has a new blue-grey paint option, and the interior is now available in two-tone brown and black upholstery.

== Powertrain ==
Li L7 uses an all-wheel drive electric range extender system with a 1.5-litre petrol engine, a "five-in-one" front drive motor unit and a "three-in-one" rear drive motor unit. The engine is not mechanically connected to the wheels, creating a series hybrid configuration. It delivers a maximum system power of 330 kW (443 hp; 449 PS), maximum torque of 620 N⋅m (63.2 kg⋅m; 457 lb⋅ft), and accelerates from 0–100 km/h (0–62 mph) in 5.3 seconds.

Calendar years	Battery	Engine		Layout	Electric motor		Combined system		0–100 km/h (62 mph)	Electric range		Cruising range	
Calendar years	Battery	Displ.	Power	Layout	Power	Torque	Power	Torque	0–100 km/h (62 mph)	CLTC	WLTC	CLTC	WLTC
2023–2024	40.9 kWh NMC	L2E15M 1,496 cc (1.5 L) I4 turbo	113 kW (152 hp; 154 PS)	AWD	Front: 130 kW (174 hp; 177 PS) Rear: 200 kW (268 hp; 272 PS)	Front: 220 N⋅m (22.4 kg⋅m; 162 lb⋅ft) Rear: 400 N⋅m (40.8 kg⋅m; 295 lb⋅ft)	330 kW (443 hp; 449 PS)	620 N⋅m (63.2 kg⋅m; 457 lb⋅ft)	5.3 seconds	210 km (130 mi)	170 km (106 mi)	1,315 km (817 mi)	1,100 km (684 mi)
2024–present	42.8 kWh Sunwoda NMC	L2E15M 1,496 cc (1.5 L) I4 turbo	113 kW (152 hp; 154 PS)	AWD	Front: 130 kW (174 hp; 177 PS) Rear: 200 kW (268 hp; 272 PS)	Front: 220 N⋅m (22.4 kg⋅m; 162 lb⋅ft) Rear: 400 N⋅m (40.8 kg⋅m; 295 lb⋅ft)	330 kW (443 hp; 449 PS)	620 N⋅m (63.2 kg⋅m; 457 lb⋅ft)	5.3 seconds	225 km (140 mi)	190 km (118 mi)	1,360 km (845 mi)	1,135 km (705 mi)
2024–present	52.3 kWh CATL NMC	L2E15M 1,496 cc (1.5 L) I4 turbo	113 kW (152 hp; 154 PS)	AWD	Front: 130 kW (174 hp; 177 PS) Rear: 200 kW (268 hp; 272 PS)	Front: 220 N⋅m (22.4 kg⋅m; 162 lb⋅ft) Rear: 400 N⋅m (40.8 kg⋅m; 295 lb⋅ft)	330 kW (443 hp; 449 PS)	620 N⋅m (63.2 kg⋅m; 457 lb⋅ft)	5.3 seconds	286 km (178 mi)	240 km (149 mi)	1,421 km (883 mi)	1,185 km (736 mi)

== Sales ==
Year	China
2023	134,089
2024	134,018
2025	78,952
