= Li L8 =

Range extender luxury mid-size crossover SUV

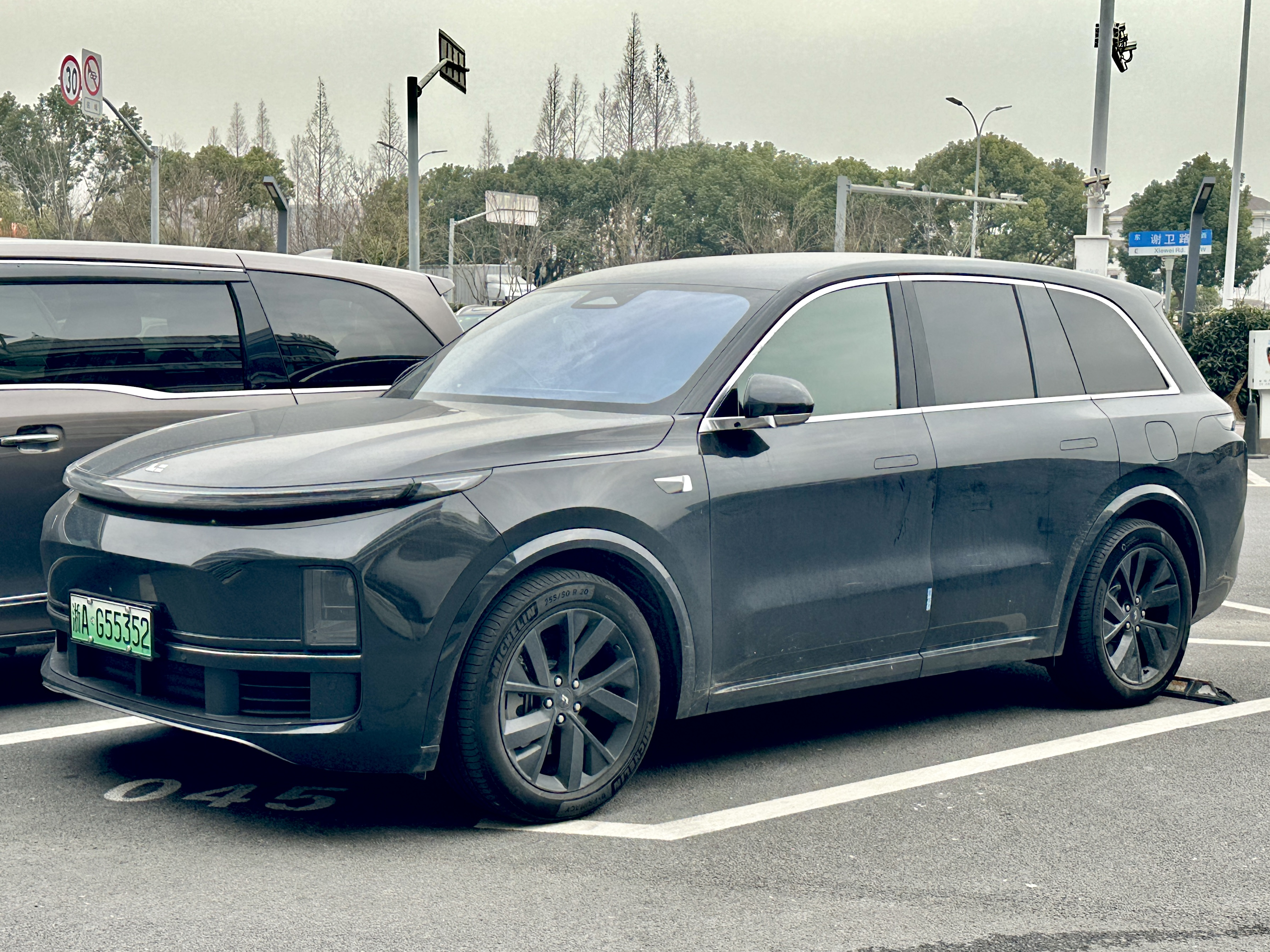

Overview
- Manufacturer: Li Auto
- Production: 2022–present

Body and chassis
- Class: Mid-size luxury crossover SUV
- Body style: 5-door SUV

Chronology
- Predecessor: Li One

The Li L8 (Chinese: 理想L8; pinyin: Lǐxiǎng L8; lit. 'ideal L8') is a range-extender luxury mid-size crossover SUV produced by Chinese manufacturer Li Auto. It is the third vehicle from the manufacturer, and also the second L-series model, which also includes the similar L9, L7 and L6.

== First generation (2022) ==
Li L8
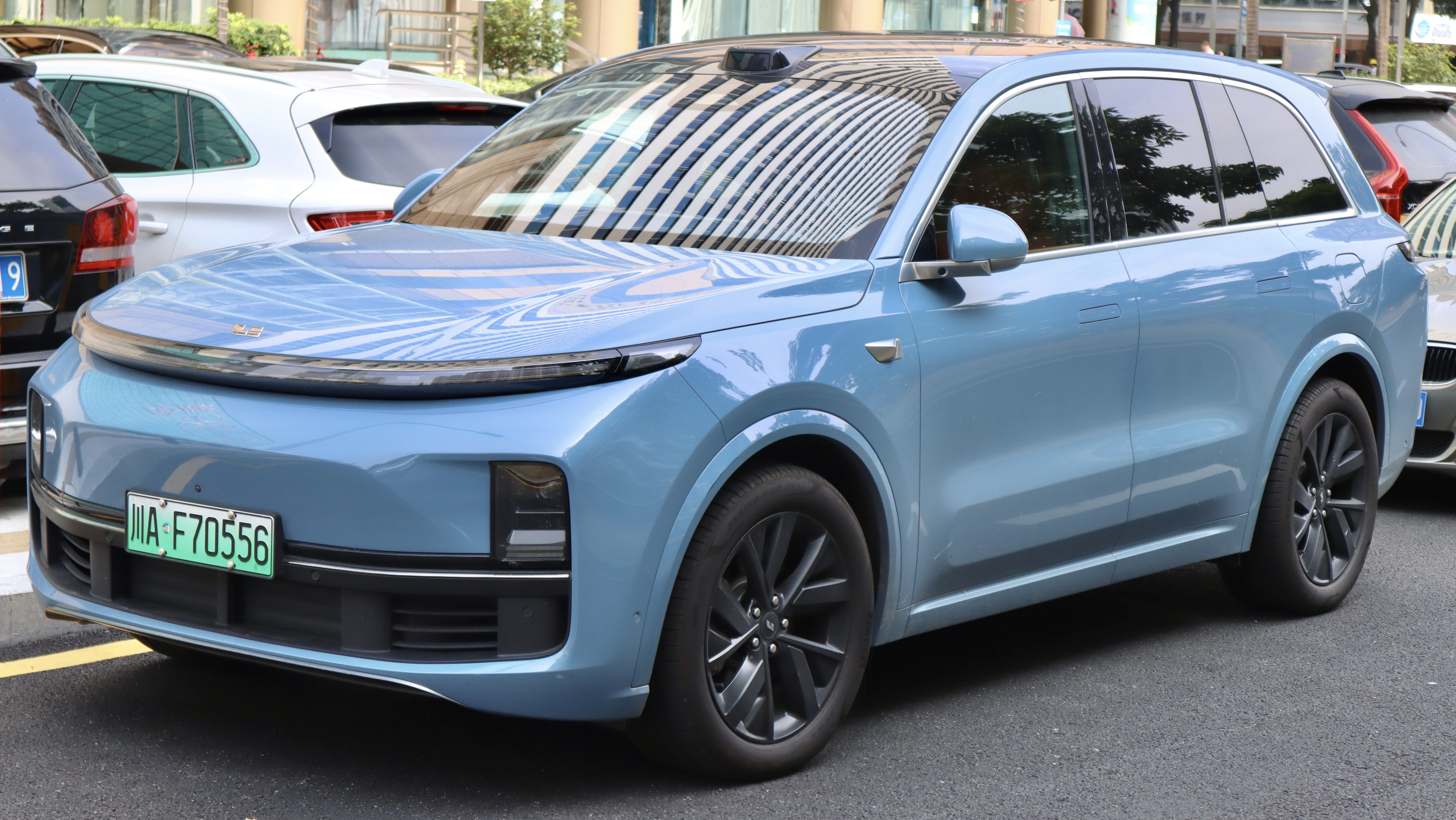

Overview
- Model code: X02
- Also called: Lixiang L8
- Production: 2022–2026 (China); 2025–present (export)
- Assembly: China: Changzhou, Jiangsu
- Designer: Ben Baum

Body and chassis
- Class: Mid-size luxury crossover SUV
- Body style: 5-door SUV
- Layout: Front-engine, dual-motor, all-wheel drive
- Related: Li L6; Li L7; Li L9

Powertrain
- Engine: Petrol range extender: 1.5 L L2E15M I4 turbo
- Electric motor: Permanent magnet synchronous
- Power output: 330 kW (440 hp; 450 PS)
- Hybrid drivetrain: Range extender series hybrid
- Battery: 40.9 kWh NMC; 42.8 kWh NMC Sunwoda/SVOLT; 52.3 kWh NMC CATL
- Range: 1,100 km (680 mi)
- Electric range: 168–235 km (104–146 mi) (WLTP)
- Plug-in charging: 75-90 kW DC

Dimensions
- Wheelbase: 3,005 mm (118.3 in)
- Length: 5,080 mm (200.0 in)
- Width: 1,995 mm (78.5 in)
- Height: 1,800 mm (70.9 in)
- Curb weight: 2,470–2,530 kg (5,445–5,578 lb)

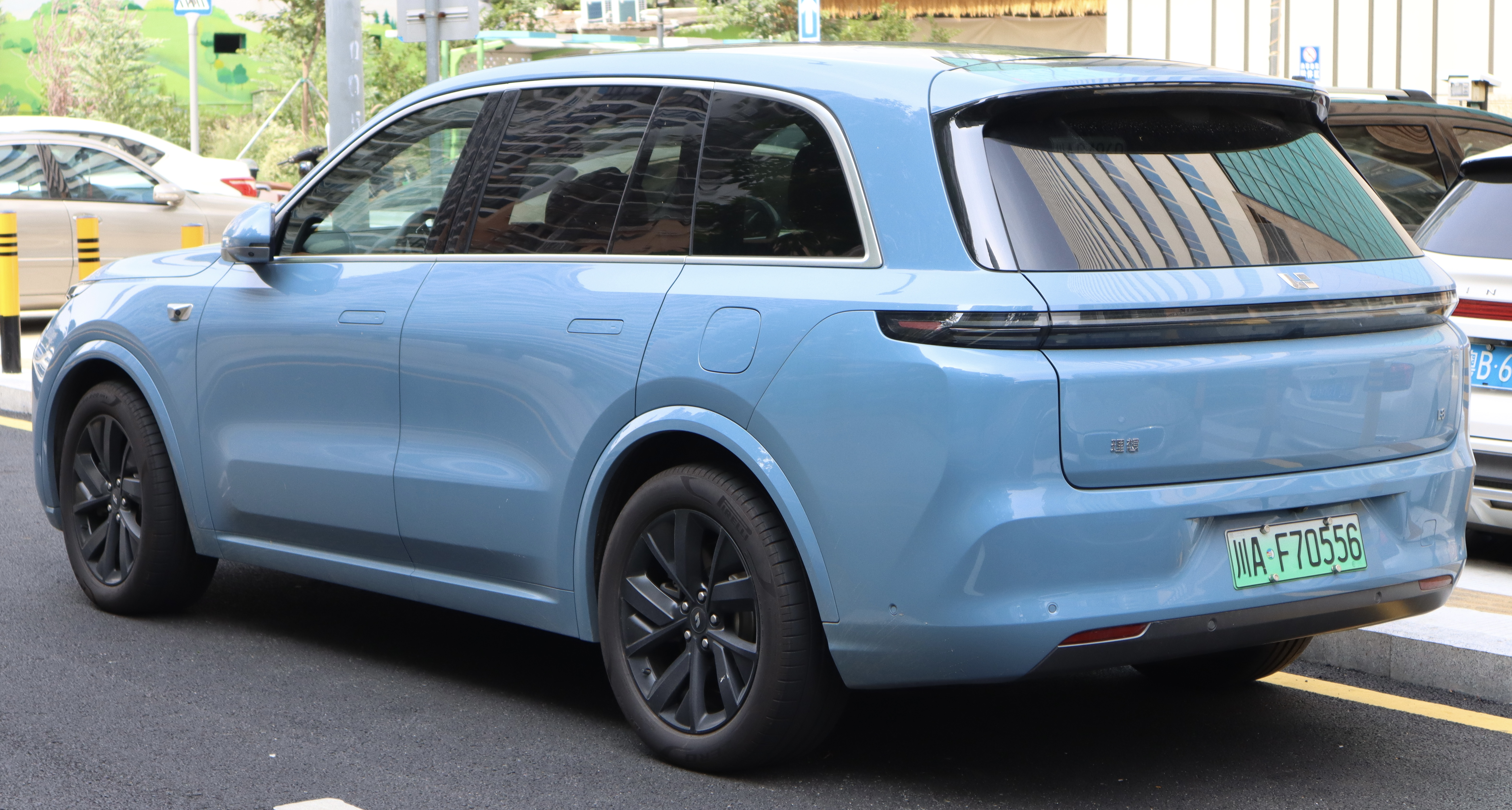
Rear view

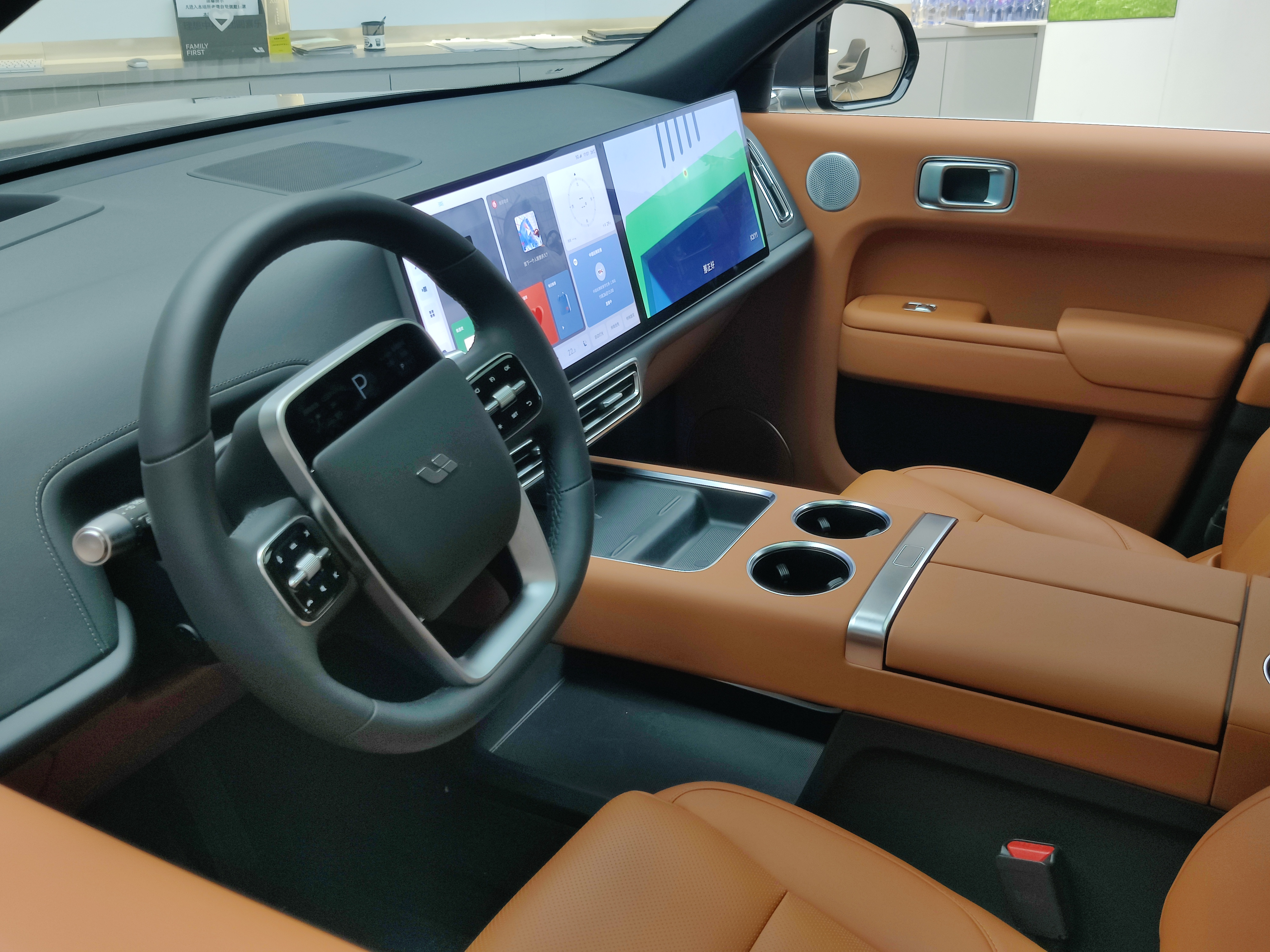
Interior

After three years of presence on the Chinese market, the Li One was discontinued in October 2022 to make way for its replacement, the Li L8. The Li L8 was presented in September 2022 at an online product launch event. The first vehicles were delivered in China from late 2022. It shares most of its specifications with the next model in the Li Auto lineup, the slightly smaller 5-seater Li L7. Specifications of the L7 are exactly the same outside of dimensions.

=== 2025 update ===
The 2025 update for the L8 was revealed on 8 May 2025, with pre-orders opening the same day and deliveries beginning the following week. The biggest change is to the ADAS system configurations, with all models now equipped with a new ATL LiDAR unit that is 60% smaller for lower drag and consumes 55% less power than the previous model, and has a detection range of up to 200 m (660 ft). The Pro model was upgraded to use a Horizon Robotics Journey 6M SoC capable of 128 TOPS and now has full capabilities, while the Max and Ultra models now use a single Nvidia Thor-U chip capable of 700 TOPS. Both are capable of running Li Auto's latest MindVLA ADAS software architecture. Li Auto says that the new system's auto emergency braking feature is capable of successfully braking for stopped traffic in unlit nighttime conditions at speeds up to 120 km/h (75 mph), and the auto emergency steering function can successfully avoid a child walking onto unlit nighttime roads from speeds up to 130 km/h (81 mph).

The air suspension has been upgraded from a single-chamber to a dual-chamber system, allowing for a 30% stiffer spring rate, resulting in 20% reduction in body roll, 11% and 26% reduced pitch under acceleration and braking respectively, and a higher moose test rating of 79.47 km/h (49 mph). The Max trim now receives the larger 52.3 kWh battery pack and associated increased range, leaving the Pro as the only remaining variant using the smaller 42.8 kWh pack. The exterior has a new blue-grey paint option, and the interior is now available in two-tone brown and black upholstery.

=== Specifications ===
It is an SUV, available with six seats in three rows. The interior has several screens sharing the same HUD and mini LED touchscreen in the steering wheel found in the Li Auto L9, an additional dual 3K 15.7-inch central touchscreen panel. The infotainment system runs on Android Automotive, powered by dual Qualcomm Snapdragon 8155 processors with 24GB of RAM and 256GB of internal storage for the L8 Max, and a single 8155 CPU processor with 12GB of RAM and 128GB of internal storage for the L8 Pro.

The L8 Max comes with the same AD MAX ADAS system found in the Li L9, which means that the L8 Max is equipped with the same dual Nvidia Orin-X chips with 508 TOPS. The L8 Max also uses the same sensor array consisting of one roof-mounted Hesai lidar, six 8MP cameras, two 5MP cameras, 12 ultrasonic radars, and a millimeter-wave radar. The L8 Pro uses a system named AD Pro, which is a vision-only system without the roof-mounted lidar. The system uses a Horizon Robotics Journey 5 chip with 128 TOPS and sensor array consists of an 8MP front camera and five 2MP peripheral cameras along with four 2MP surround view cameras, 12 ultrasonic sensors, and one millimeter-wave radar. It will be equipped with a Level 2 autonomous driving system.

=== Powertrain ===
The vehicle's powertrain can be described as a range extended vehicle. It has two electric motors: a 130-kilowatt (174 hp; 177 PS) motor in the front and a 200-kilowatt (268 hp; 272 PS) motor in the rear. It is also equipped with a front-mounted 1.5-litre turbocharged 4-cylinder petrol engine with a 65-litre (17.2 US gal; 14.3 imp gal) petrol tank capacity. The petrol engine is a range extender for the electric motors; it does not directly power the wheels. Power is supplied by a 40.9 kWh (147 MJ) battery pack. Total power output is 330 kW (443 hp; 449 PS) and 620 N⋅m (457 lb⋅ft; 63.2 kg⋅m).

The company claims a WLTC range of 700 km (430 mi), and an electric-only WLTC range of 168 km (104 mi) with the CLTC range being 210 km (130 mi). Charging to 80% takes 30 minutes with a fast charger, and a full charge with 200V AC power takes 6.5 hours.

== Second generation (2026) ==
Second generation
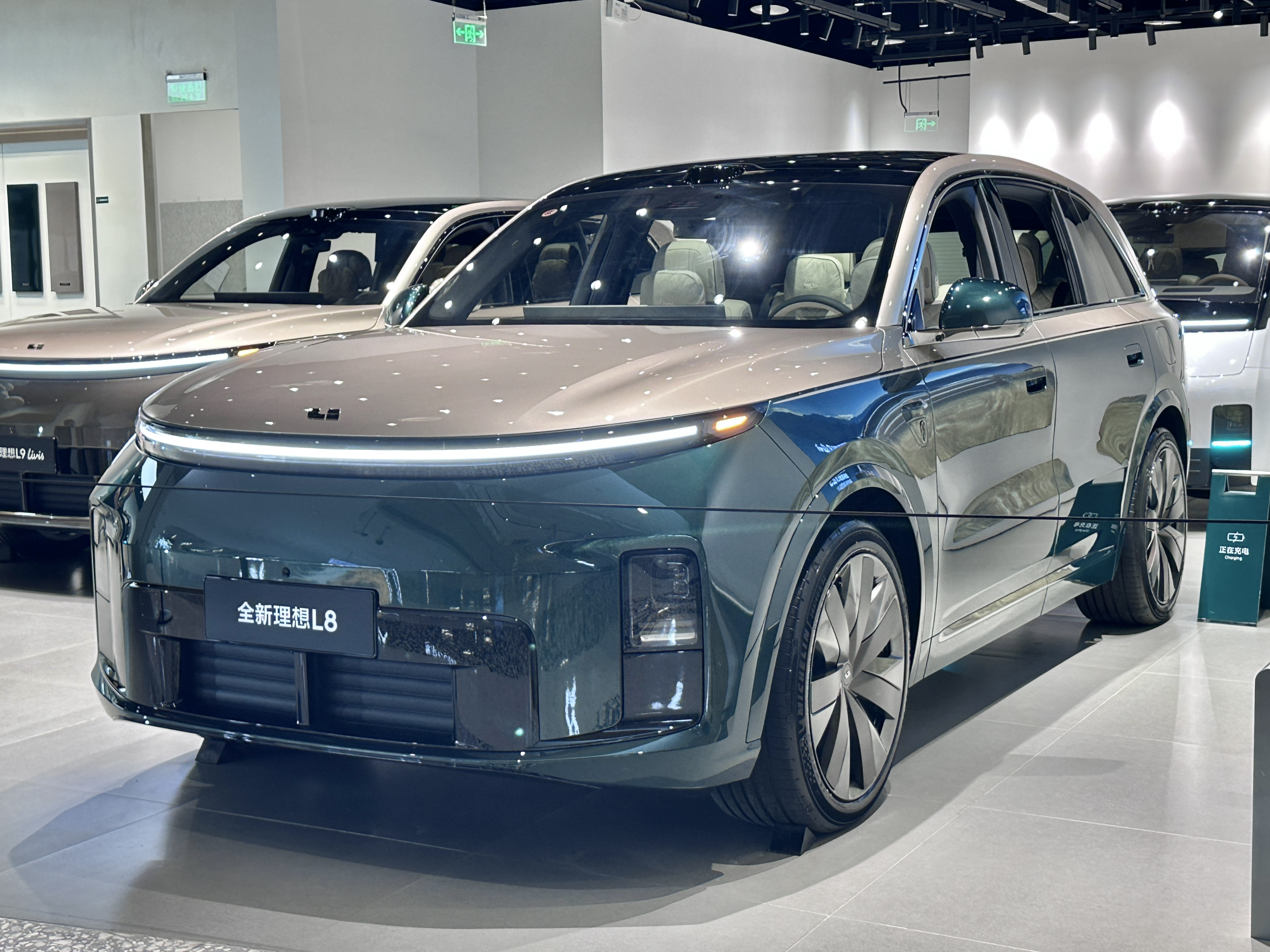

Overview
- Production: 2026–present
- Assembly: China: Changzhou, Jiangsu
- Designer: Ben Baum

Body and chassis
- Related: Li L9 II

Powertrain
- Engine: Petrol range extender: 1.5 L L3E15CA turbo I4
- Battery: 72.7 kWh NMC
- Electric range: 343 km (213 mi) (WLTC)

Dimensions
- Wheelbase: 3,045 mm (119.9 in)
- Length: 5,135 mm (202.2 in)
- Width: 2,000 mm (78.7 in)
- Height: 1,800 mm (70.9 in)
- Curb weight: 2,740–2,770 kg (6,041–6,107 lb)

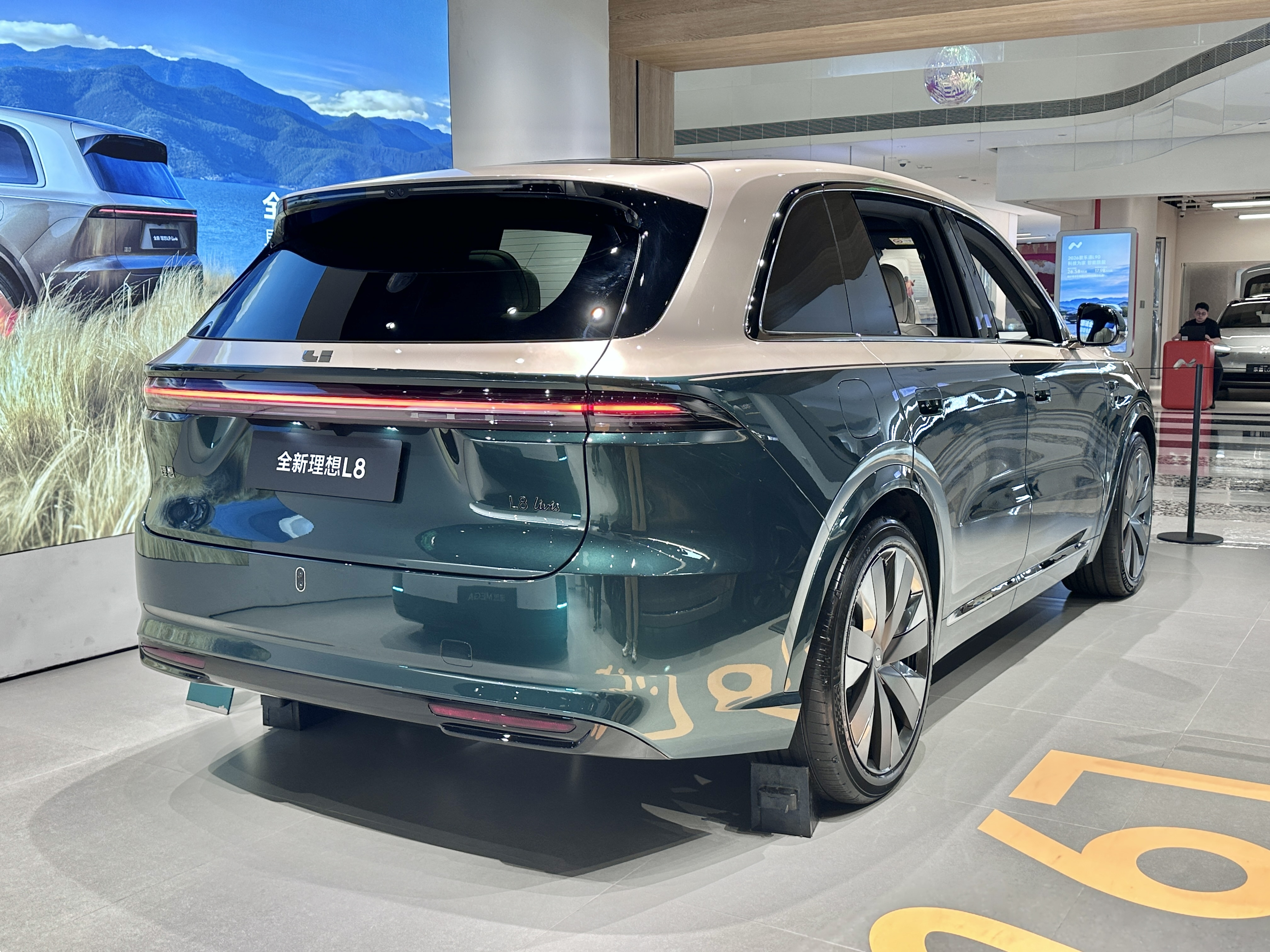
Rear view

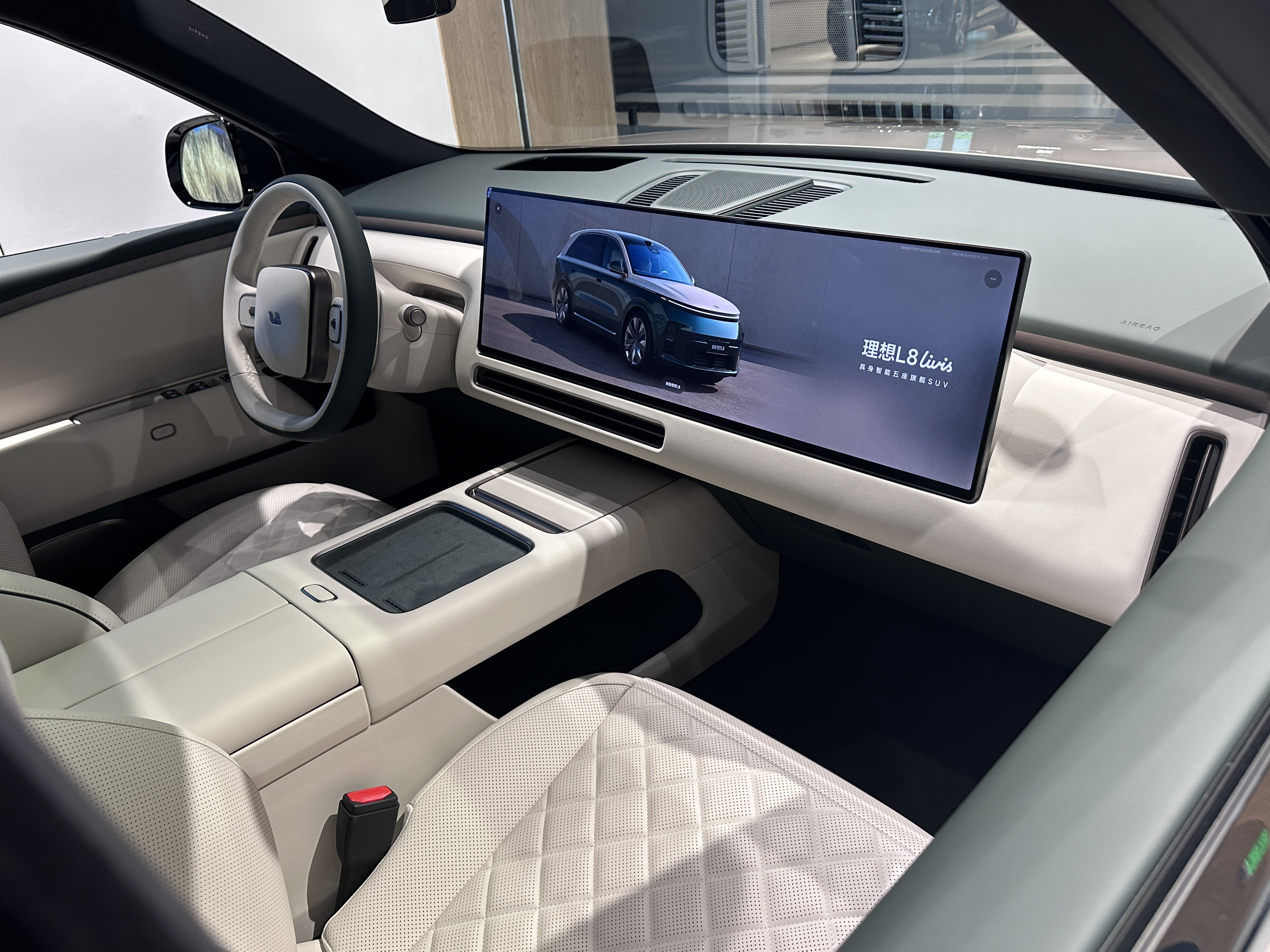
Interior

The second generation L8 was unveiled on June 12, 2026 and was launched in China on 23 June. Deliveries are expected to start in Q3 2026.

== Sales ==
| Year | China |
|---|---|
| 2022 | 15,482 |
| 2023 | 117,990 |
| 2024 | 77,623 |
| 2025 | 44,028 |
