= Li L9 =

Range-extender full-size luxury crossover SUV

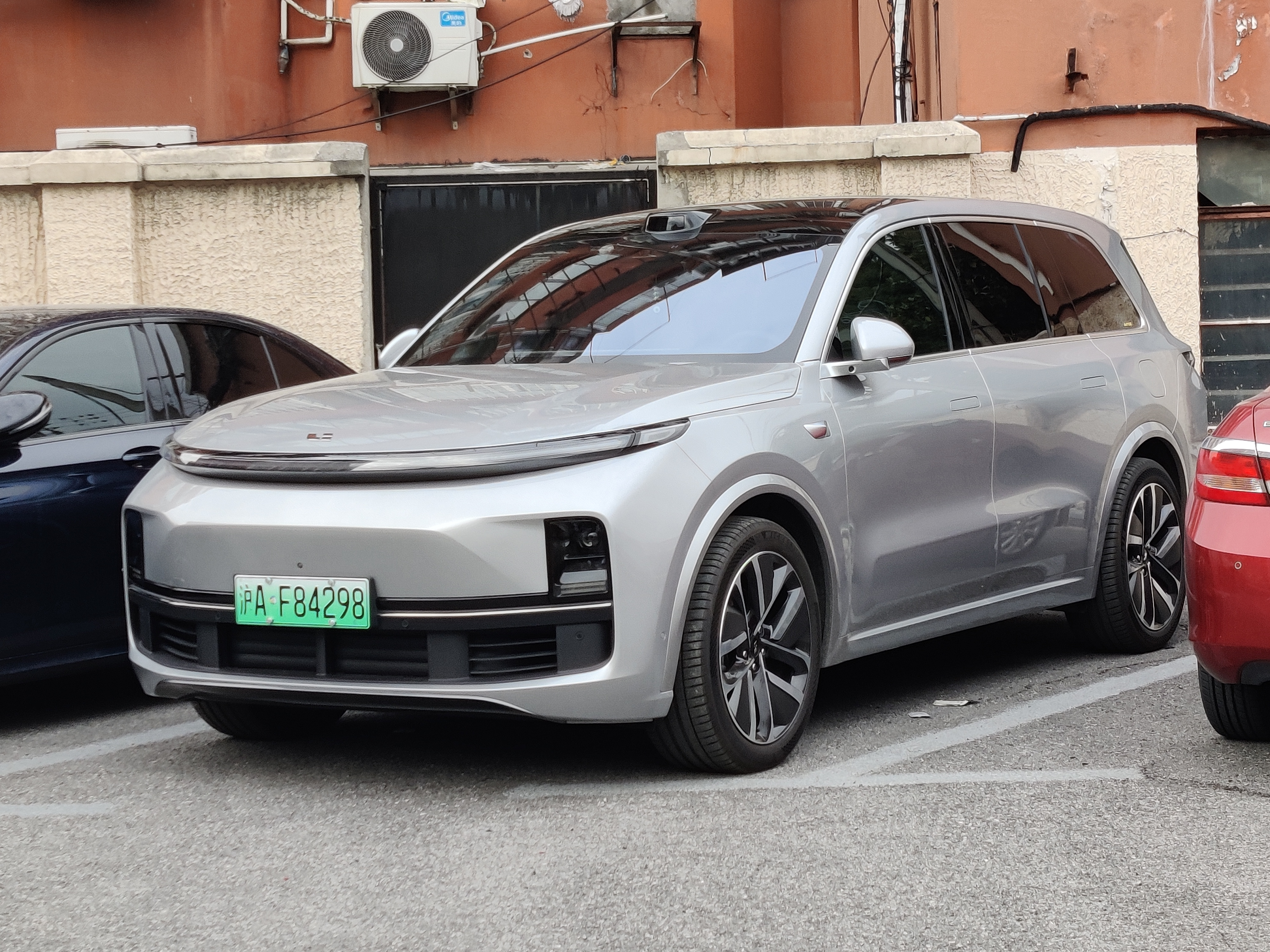

Overview
- Manufacturer: Li Auto
- Production: 2022–present

Body and chassis
- Class: Full-size luxury crossover SUV
- Body style: 5-door SUV

The Li L9 (Chinese: 理想L9; pinyin: Lǐxiǎng L9; lit. 'ideal L9') is a range-extender luxury full-size crossover SUV produced by Chinese manufacturer Li Auto. It is the second vehicle from the manufacturer after the Li One, and also the first L-series model, which also includes the similar L8, L7 and L6.

== First generation (2022) ==
First generation
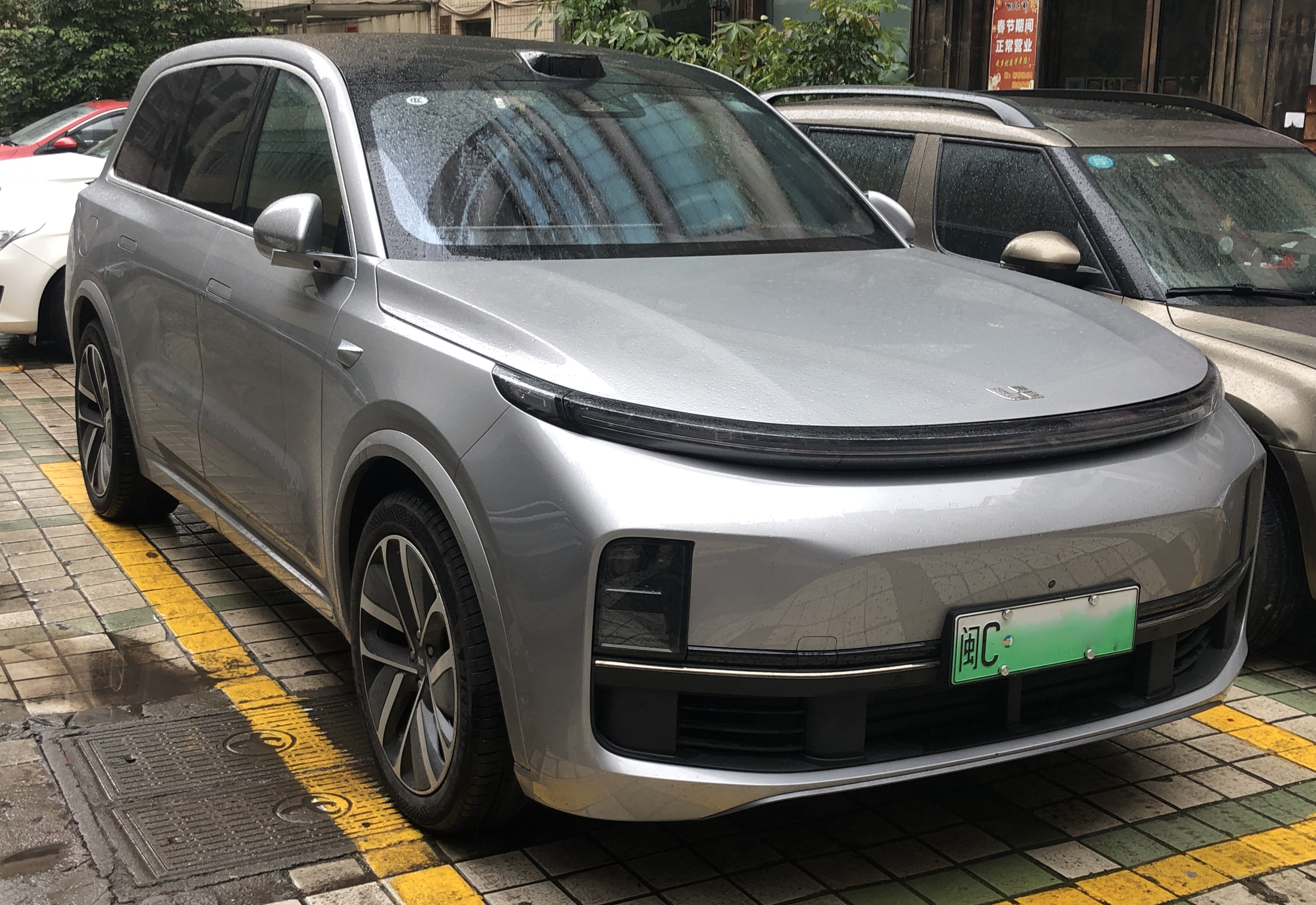

Overview
- Model code: X01
- Production: 2022–2026 (China); 2025–2027 (export)
- Assembly: China: Changzhou, Jiangsu
- Designer: Ben Baum, Gloria Ge

Body and chassis
- Layout: Front-engine, dual-motor, all-wheel drive
- Related: Li L6; Li L7; Li L8

Powertrain
- Engine: Gasoline range extender: 1.5 L L2E15M turbo I4
- Electric motor: Permanent magnet synchronous
- Power output: 330 kW (440 hp)
- Transmission: Single-speed gear reduction
- Battery: 44.5 kWh NMC CATL; 52.3 kWh NMC CATL
- Range: 1,176 km (731 mi)
- Electric range: 180–235 km (112–146 mi) (WLTP); 215–280 km (134–174 mi) (CLTC)
- Plug-in charging: 75–90 kW DC

Dimensions
- Wheelbase: 3,105 mm (122.2 in)
- Length: 5,218 mm (205.4 in)
- Width: 1,998 mm (78.7 in)
- Height: 1,800 mm (70.9 in)
- Curb weight: 2,520–2,570 kg (5,556–5,666 lb)

The first generation L9 was unveiled online on March 8, 2022 and officially launched on June 21, 2022 with the first vehicles delivered in China from August 2022.

=== Design and equipment ===
The L9 is available with six seats in three rows. The interior has a pair of two 4-millimetre (0.16 in) thick 15.7-inch wide screens.

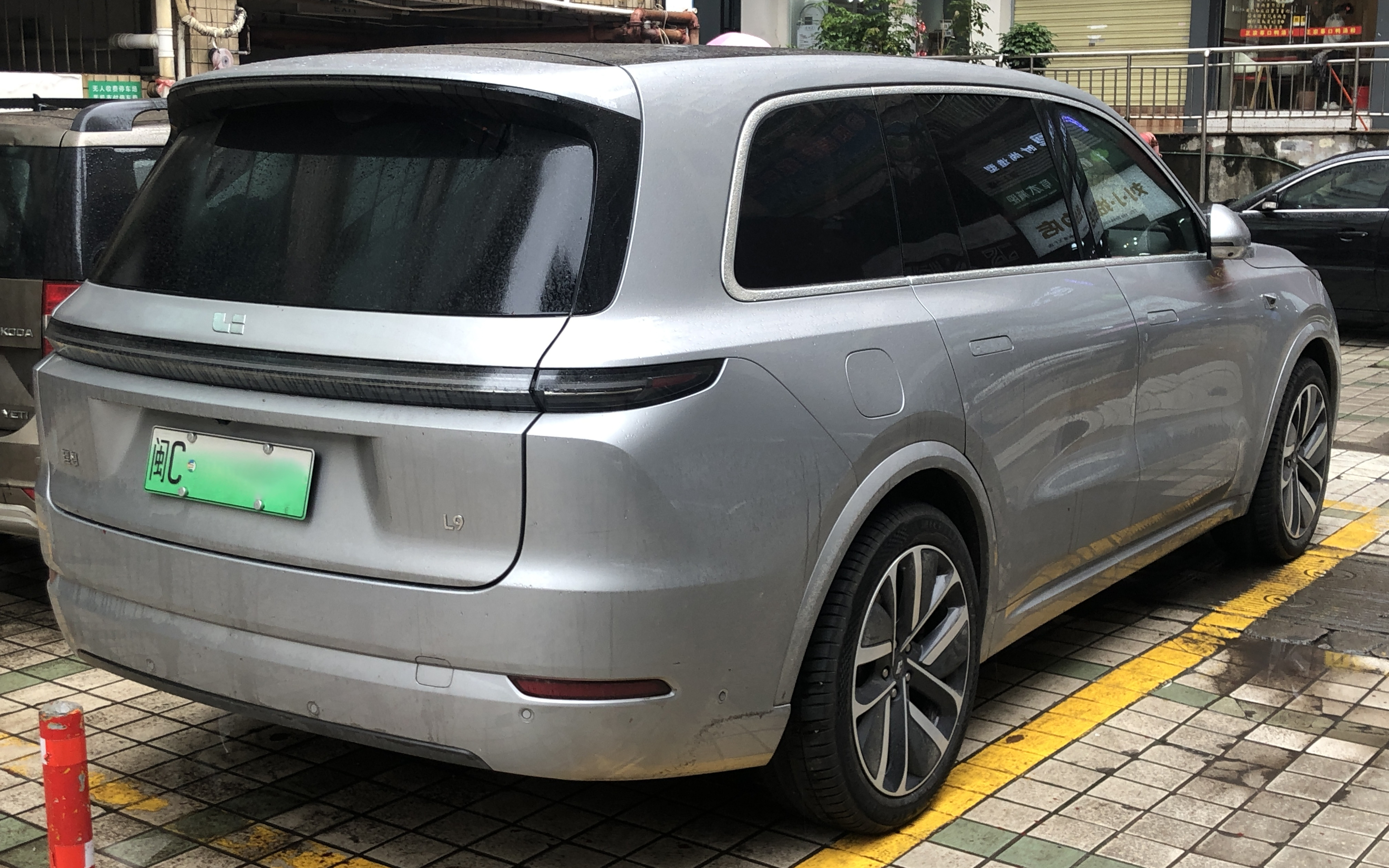
Rear view

=== Powertrain ===
The vehicle can be described as a range extended vehicle. It has two electric motors: a 130-kilowatt (174 hp; 177 PS) motor in the front and a 200-kilowatt (268 hp; 272 PS) motor in the rear. It is also equipped with a front-mounted 1.5-litre turbocharged 4-cylinder petrol engine with a 65-litre (17.2 US gal; 14.3 imp gal) petrol tank capacity. The newer facelifted model has a gas tank of 55 litres (14.5 US gal; 12.1 imp gal). The petrol engine is a range extender for the electric motors; it does not directly power the wheels.

Total power output is 240 kW (322 hp; 326 PS) and 530 N⋅m (54 kg⋅m; 391 lb⋅ft). The company claims a NEDC range of 1,315 kilometres (817 mi), and an electric-only NEDC range of 215 kilometres (134 mi). The L9 accelerates 0–100 km/h (0–62 mph) in 5.3 seconds.

Charging to 80% takes 40 minutes with a fast charger. A full charge at 200V takes 6 hours. Battery capacity is 40.6 kWh, out of which 37.2 kWh is usable.

The L9 has a 42.6kWh NMC battery weighing 254.3 kg (561 lb), which was replaced in 2024 a 52.3kWh NMC pack weighing 282.3 kg (622 lb).

Specifications
Year	Power	Torque	Battery		EV range		Fuel cons.	Charging		0–100 km/h (62 mph)	Top speed	Kerb weight
Year	Power	Torque	Type	Weight	WLTP	CLTC	WLTP	Peak DC	20–80%	0–100 km/h (62 mph)	Top speed	Kerb weight
2022–23	443 hp (330 kW; 449 PS)	620 N⋅m (457 lb⋅ft)	42.6 kWh NMC CATL	254.3 kg (561 lb)	175 km (109 mi)	215 km (134 mi)	7.8 L/100 km (30 mpg_{‑US})	75 kW	30 mins	5.3 s	180 km/h (112 mph)	2,520 kg (5,556 lb)
2024	443 hp (330 kW; 449 PS)	620 N⋅m (457 lb⋅ft)	52.3 kWh NMC CATL	282.3 kg (622 lb)	235 km (146 mi)	280 km (174 mi)	7.6 L/100 km (31 mpg_{‑US})	90 kW	25 mins	5.3 s	180 km/h (112 mph)	2,570 kg (5,666 lb)
2025	443 hp (330 kW; 449 PS)	620 N⋅m (457 lb⋅ft)	52.3 kWh NMC CATL	282.3 kg (622 lb)	235 km (146 mi)	280 km (174 mi)	7.6 L/100 km (31 mpg_{‑US})	90 kW	25 mins	5.18 s	180 km/h (112 mph)	2,570 kg (5,666 lb)

=== Update (2025) ===
The 2025 update for the L9 was revealed on May 8, 2025, with pre-orders opening the same day and deliveries beginning the following week. The ADAS system configuration has been updated, with all models now being equipped with a new ATL LiDAR unit that is 60% smaller for lower drag and consumes 55% less power than the previous model with a detection range of up to 200 m (660 ft). The Pro model was upgraded to use a Horizon Robotics Journey 6M SoC capable of 128 TOPS and now has full ADAS capabilities, while the Ultra model now uses a single NVIDIA Thor-U chip capable of 700 TOPS and will be capable of running Li Auto's latest MindVLA ADAS software architecture after it launches via an OTA update later in 2025. Li Auto says that the new system's auto emergency braking feature is capable of successfully braking for stopped traffic in unlit nighttime conditions at speeds up to 120 km/h (75 mph), and the auto emergency steering function can successfully avoid a child walking onto unlit nighttime roads from speeds up to 130 km/h (81 mph).

The exterior has a new Elegant Grey paint option, and the Ultra trim features a new frosted gold trim package replacing chrome on the wheels, window trim, and badges. The air suspension has been upgraded to a dual-chamber dual-valve system, resulting in a 24% reduction in body roll, 12% reduced pitch under acceleration and braking, and a higher moose test rating of 80.34 km/h (50 mph). The first and second rows now feature an 18-point hot stone massaging function, which can warm up to 45 °C (113 °F) within 5 minutes. The rear passenger entertainment display has been upgraded from 15.7 inches to an 86% larger 21.4-inch 3K LCD screen with 800 nits of brightness. The central rearview mirror is now a digital mirror fed by a 4K camera with a 120-degree field of view. The interior is now available in two-tone brown and black upholstery.

== Second generation (2026) ==
Second generation
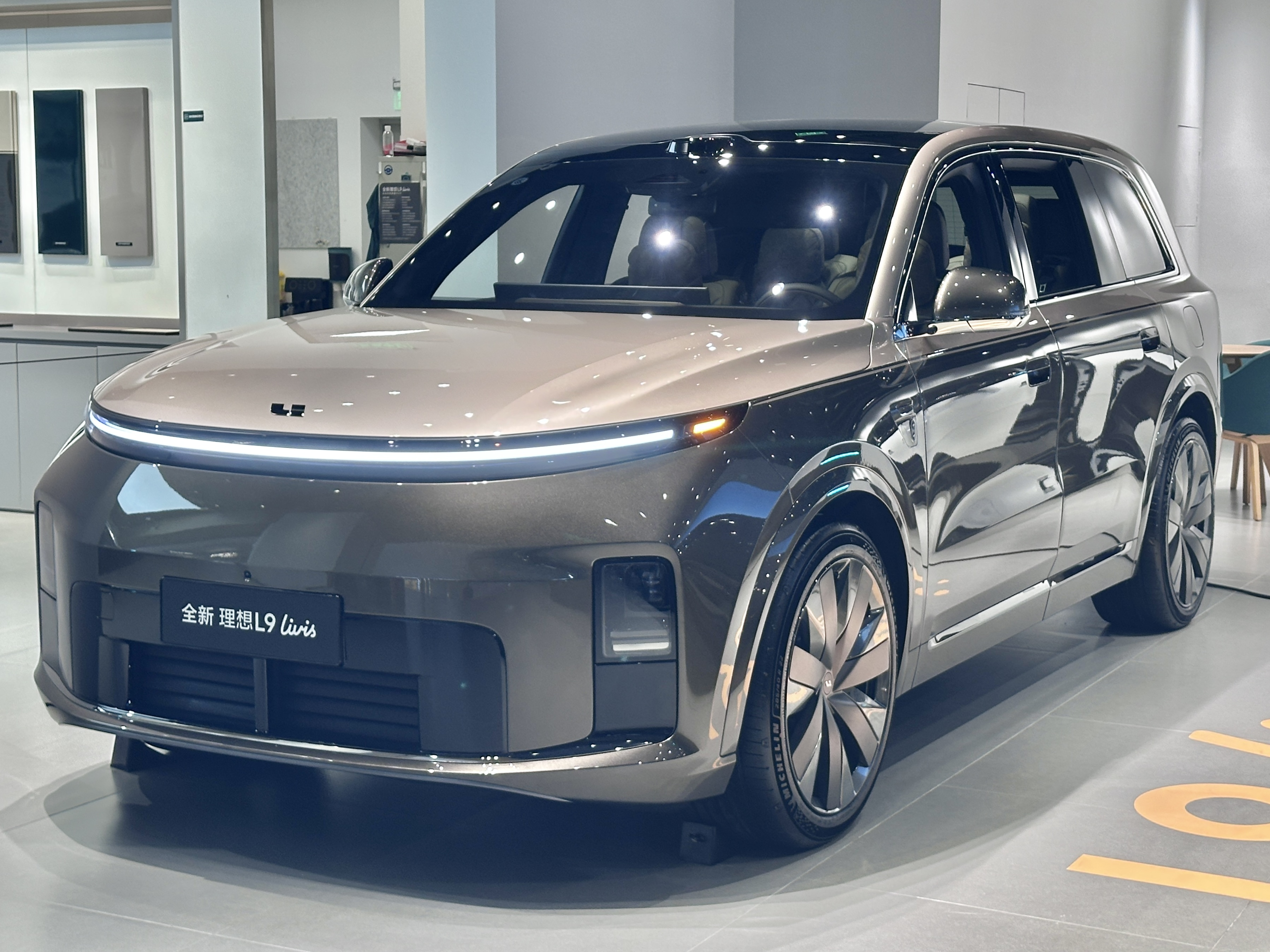

Overview
- Production: 2026–present
- Assembly: China: Changzhou, Jiangsu; Kazakhstan: Kostanay
- Designer: Ben Baum

Body and chassis
- Related: Li L8 II

Powertrain
- Engine: Petrol range extender: 1.5 L L3E15CA turbo I4
- Battery: 72.7 kWh NMC CATL
- Range: 1,650 km (1,025 mi) (CLTC)
- Electric range: 332–340 km (206–211 mi) (WLTP); 420 km (261 mi) (CLTC)
- Plug-in charging: 420 kW DC

Dimensions
- Wheelbase: 3,125 mm (123.0 in)
- Length: 5,255 mm (206.9 in)
- Width: 2,000 mm (78.7 in)
- Height: 1,810 mm (71.3 in)
- Curb weight: 2,755–2,835 kg (6,074–6,250 lb)

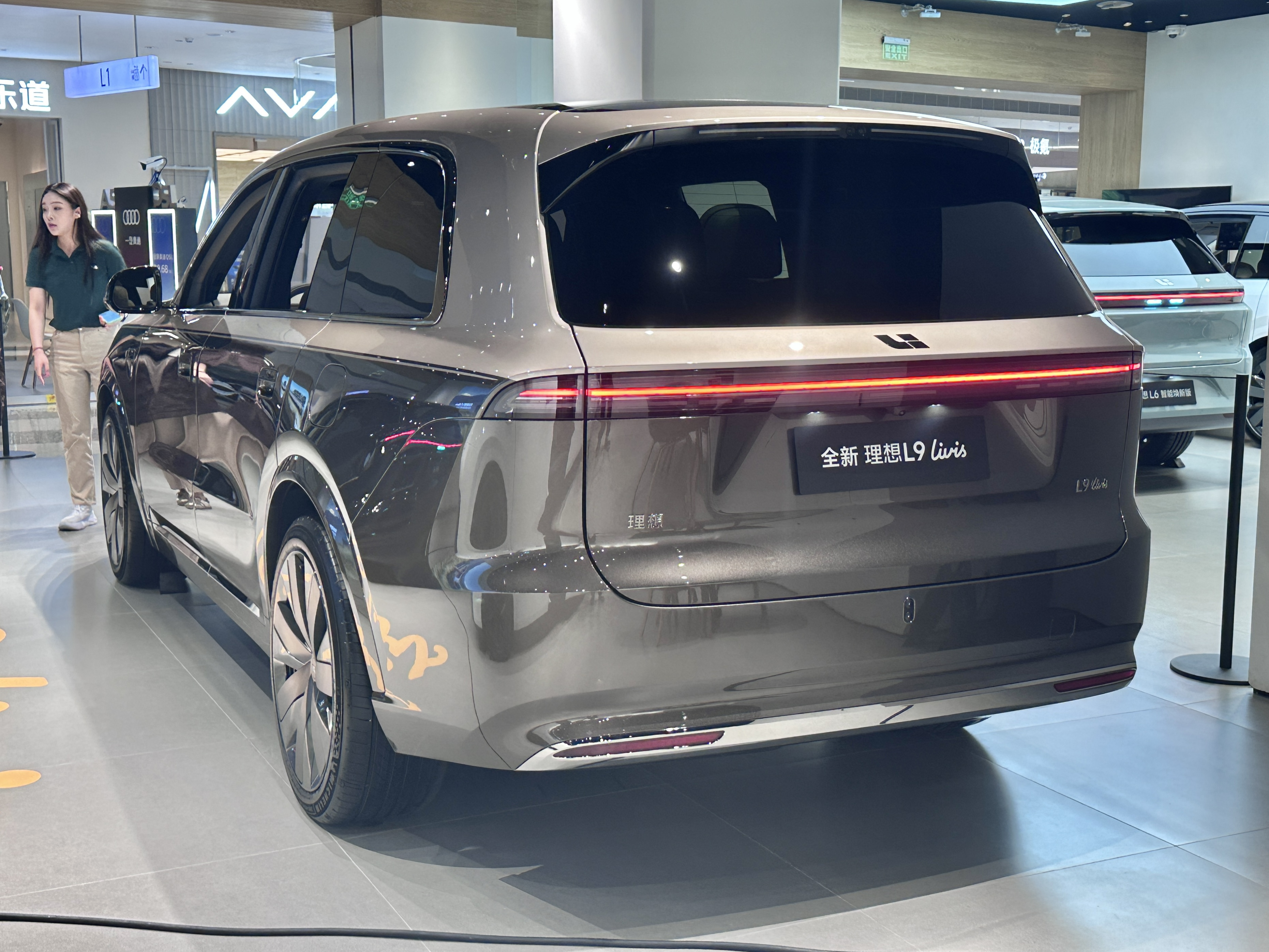
Rear view

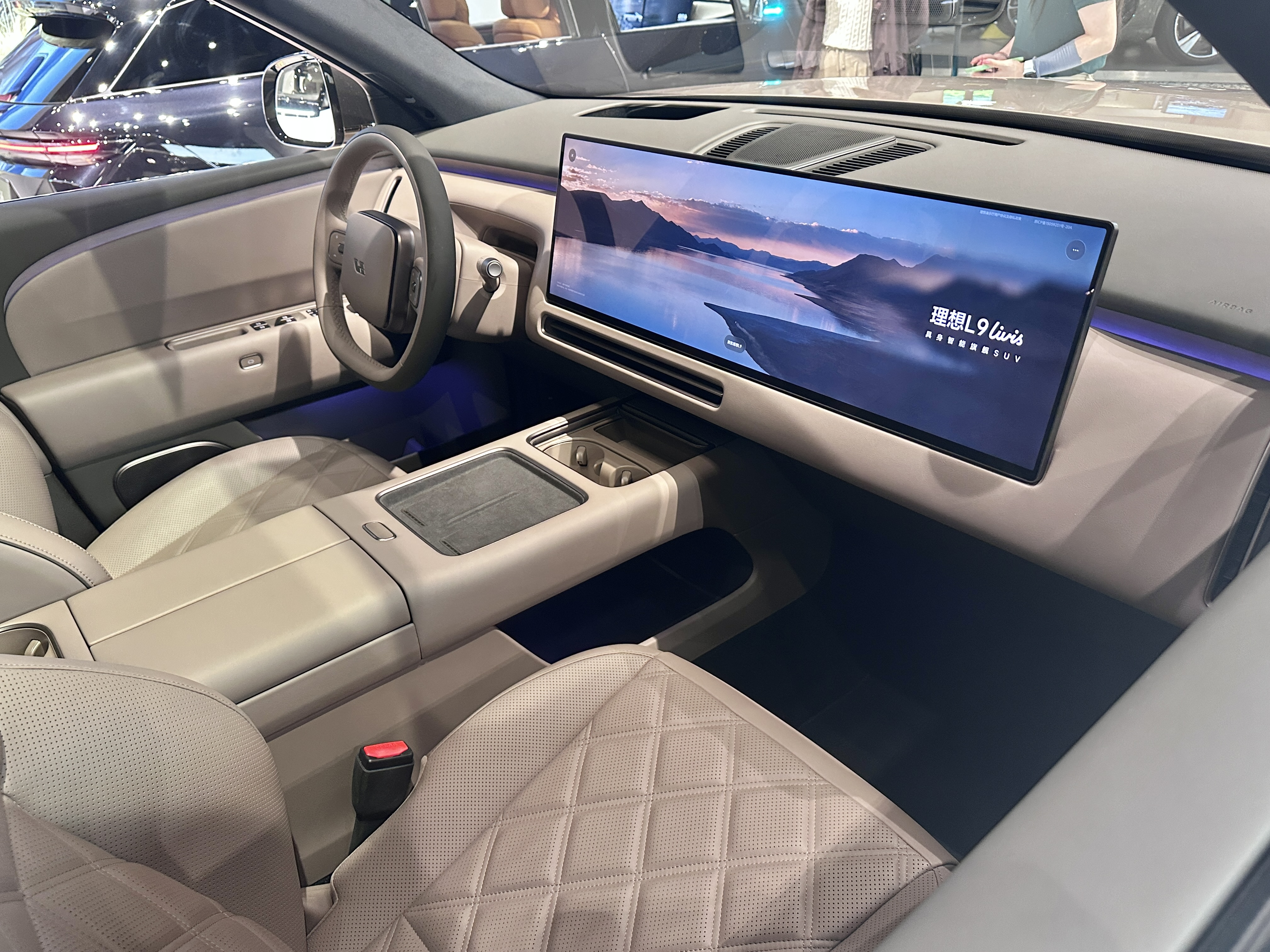
Interior

The second generation L9 was officially unveiled on February 6, 2026. In addition to the base model, a new higher-end version named the L9 Livis was announced, featuring a duotone paint scheme. On 24 April 2026, the second generation L9 made its public debut at the Beijing Auto Show. Additional details about the model were revealed on 7 May, and was launched in China on 15 May with deliveries starting at the same day.

It was previously speculated that the L9 would be receiving a facelift instead of a new generation.

=== Design ===
Compared to its predecessor, the second generation L9 has a larger body in every dimension and an increased wheelbase. While it retains the lightbar from its predecessor, it gains a new front fascia that resembles other Li Auto vehicles, an extended D-pillar, redesigned rear end and metal accents.

=== Features ===
Li Auto claims that the second generation L9 has the "most intelligent driving brain", with a computing power of 2,560 TOPS (trillion operations per second), based on two 5-nanometer in-house-developed M100 Ultra (Chinese: 马赫M100) chips. This hardware is paired with a 360-degree 4-LiDAR setup and UWB sensors which replace the typical ultrasonic sensors. It also features an 800V fully active independent suspension which eliminates the need for anti-roll bars, steer-by-wire, four-wheel steering for a 5.4-metre (18 ft) turning radius, and an electro-mechanical braking setup.

=== Powertrain ===
The L9 continues to use a range extender powertrain. It has been updated with a new 1.5-liter turbocharged inline-four with a peak power of 150 hp (112 kW; 152 PS), which Li Auto claims uses the "world's first ultra-low temperature wide-range low-pressure EGR system" to improve fuel economy to 6.3 L/100 km (37 mpg_{‑US}), down from the 7.6 L/100 km (31 mpg_{‑US}) achieved by the previous model. It has a 72.7 kWh NMC battery capable of a pure electric WLTP range of up to 340 kilometres (211 mi) and 5C charge rates of up to 420 kW. The battery pack weighs 411 kg (906 lb) and the curb weight ranges from 2,755 to 2,835 kg (6,074 to 6,250 lb).

== Sales ==
Year	China
2022	38,973
2023	114,377
2024	85,817
2025	45,212
