= Li L6 =

Range-extender mid-size luxury crossover SUV

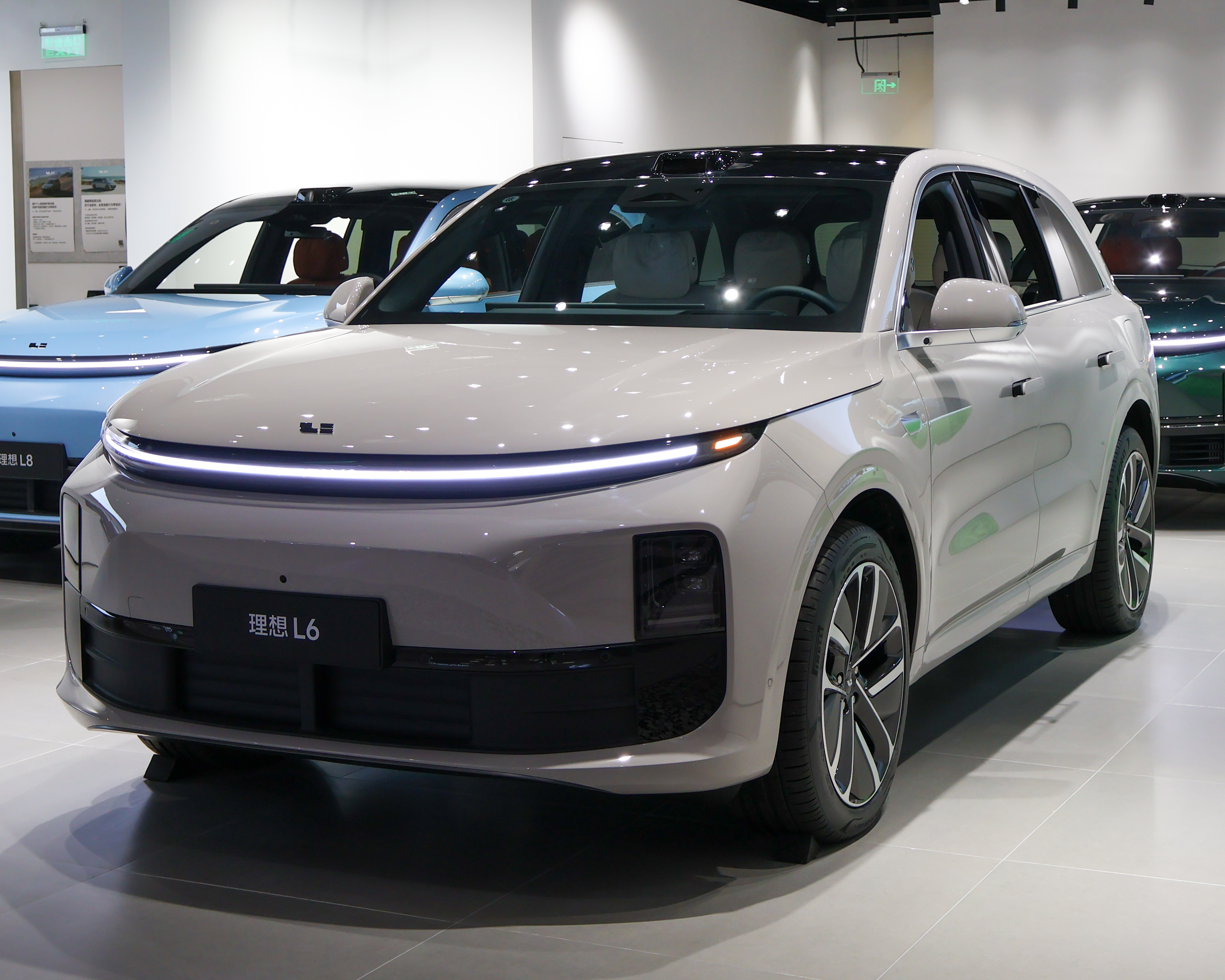

Overview
- Manufacturer: Li Auto
- Also called: Lixiang L6
- Production: 2024–present

Body and chassis
- Class: Mid-size luxury crossover SUV
- Body style: 5-door SUV

The Li L6 (Chinese: 理想L6; pinyin: Lǐxiǎng L6; lit. 'ideal L6') is a range-extender luxury mid-size crossover SUV produced by Chinese manufacturer Li Auto. It is the manufacturer's sixth vehicle and the fourth model in the L-series, following the similar L7, L8 and L9. As the brand's most affordable offering, the first-generation L6 quickly became Li Auto's best-selling model, surpassing 200,000 deliveries within nine months of launch. A revamped second generation was launched in July 2026 as part of a broader overhaul of Li Auto's L-series lineup.

== First generation (2024) ==
First generation
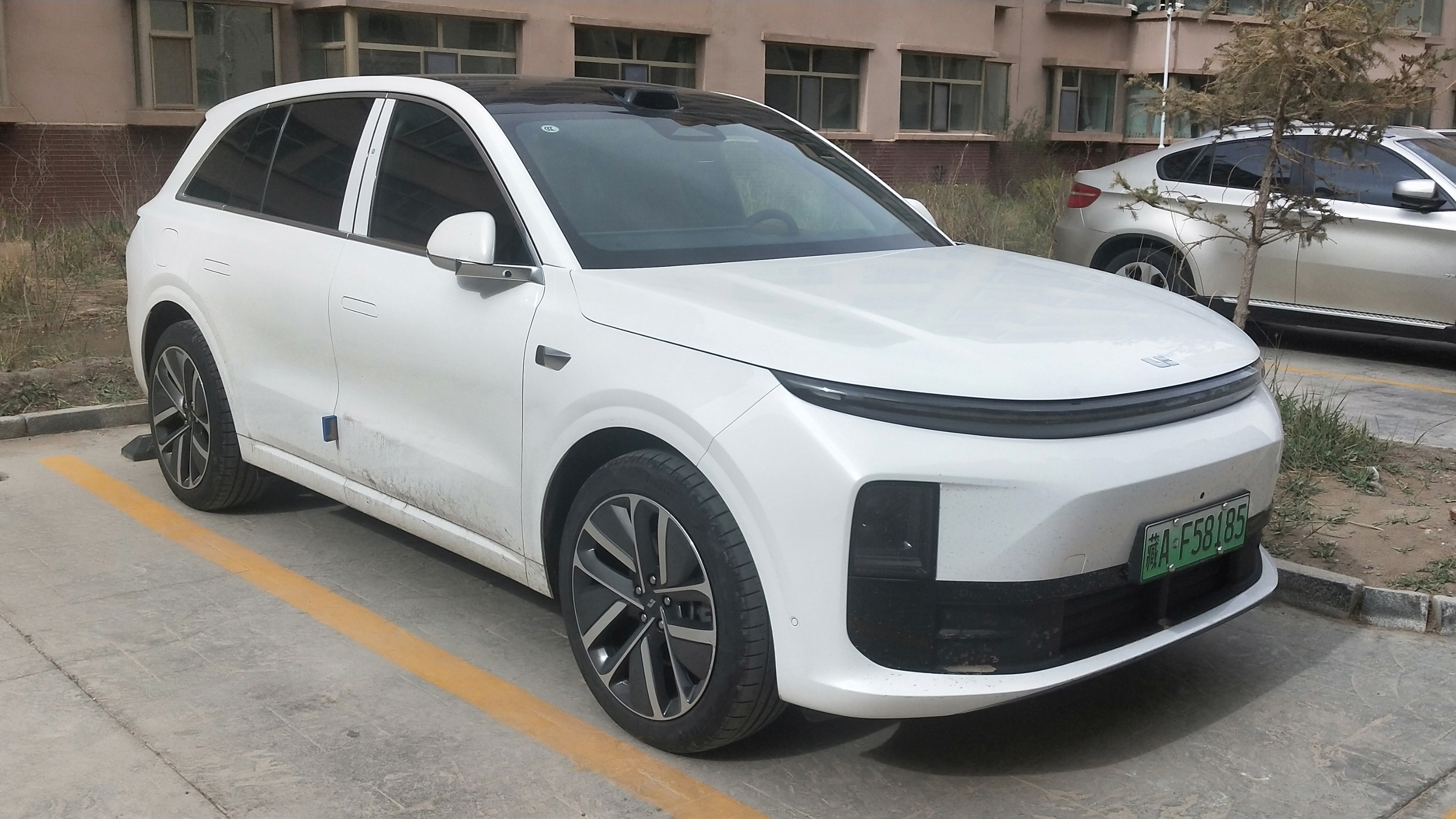

Overview
- Production: 2024–2026
- Assembly: China: Changzhou, Jiangsu
- Designer: Ben Baum

Body and chassis
- Layout: Front-engine, dual-motor, four-wheel-drive
- Related: Li L7; Li L8; Li L9

Powertrain
- Engine: Petrol range extender: 1.5 L L2E15M turbo I4
- Electric motor: Permanent magnet synchronous motor
- Power output: 300 kW (400 hp; 410 PS)
- Transmission: Single-speed gear reduction
- Battery: 36.8 kWh LFP (CATL)
- Range: 1,160 km (720 mi)
- Electric range: 182 km (113 mi) (WLTP)
- Plug-in charging: GB/T 20234: 90 kW DC; 7 kW AC; 3.5 kW V2L

Dimensions
- Wheelbase: 2,920 mm (115.0 in)
- Length: 4,925 mm (193.9 in)
- Width: 1,960 mm (77.2 in)
- Height: 1,735 mm (68.3 in)
- Curb weight: 2,330–2,345 kg (5,137–5,170 lb)

On 18 April 2024, the fourth, even smaller model in Li Auto's electric range-extender SUV family was revealed under the name Li L6. Compared to the L7, the L6 gained a shorter body and wheelbase, making it the first Li Auto vehicle with a length under 5 m (16.4 ft), distinguished by a more angled rear. The L6 became Li Auto's least expensive product at launch. The vehicle's unveiling was pulled forward from its originally planned June launch in response to the successful launch of the competing AITO M7. Deliveries began in late April 2024, with higher volumes starting in May.

The L6 uses a double wishbone suspension at the front, and a multi-link independent suspension for the rear axle. Unlike other L-series models, it is not available with air suspension, but is equipped with continuous damping control. It has a ride height of 180 mm (7.1 in) and approach and departure angles of 20 and 21 degrees, respectively. It is available with either 20- or 21-inch wheels.

The interior features a similar minimalist design to other models in the L-series. The dashboard features a continuous dual 3K-resolution 15.7-inch touchscreen display panel spanning from the centre to the passenger side, serving as both infotainment system and passenger entertainment display, powered by a Qualcomm Snapdragon 8295P SoC. The instrument cluster is a narrow 4.6-inch touchscreen display built into the top of the steering wheel hub, supplemented by a 13.3-inch head-up display. The centre console features dual 50 W wireless charging pads and two circular cupholders ahead of a split-opening storage area.

The seats are upholstered in Nappa leather with heating and ventilation functions, and the front row has a massaging function. The vehicle also has a tri-zone HVAC system controlled through the infotainment display, a standard 19-speaker sound system, double-glazed windows, and a panoramic sunroof. An 8.8-litre (0.31 cu ft) refrigerator capable of cooling and heating between −7–50 °C (19–122 °F) is optional. The L6 has 491 litres (17.3 cu ft) of cargo space, or 1,923 litres (67.9 cu ft) with the power-folding rear seats down.

The L6 came standard with an ADAS system called AD Pro, with a sensor suite consisting of a mmWave radar, 10 cameras, and 12 ultrasonic sensors, powered by a Horizon Robotics Journey 5 SoC capable of 128 TOPS. Higher trims received the AD Max system, adding a roof-mounted 128-line Hesai LiDAR and a higher-resolution 11-camera array, powered by two NVIDIA Orin X SoCs with a combined 508 TOPS. It was capable of supervised autonomous driving on highways and, initially, limited urban scenarios, later expanded to nationwide coverage via an over-the-air update.

Powertrain output was 402 hp (300 kW; 408 PS) and 529 N⋅m (390 lb⋅ft) of torque, from a 130 kW (170 hp; 180 PS) front motor and a 170 kW (230 hp; 230 PS) rear motor, supplied by a 36.8 kWh CATL LFP battery pack, making it the first Li Auto vehicle to use LFP chemistry. The 1.5-litre all-aluminium turbocharged range-extender engine produced 152 hp (113 kW; 154 PS), with a claimed peak thermal efficiency of 40.5%. CLTC range was rated at 212 km (132 mi) on battery power alone and 1,390 km (860 mi) combined with the range extender and a 60-liter (16 U.S. gal) fuel tank. Charging from 20–80% took 20 minutes on DC fast charging. Acceleration from 0–100 km/h (62 mph) took 5.4 seconds, with a top speed of 180 km/h (110 mph).

=== 2025 update ===
Li Auto revealed a 2025 update for the L6 at Auto Shanghai 2025. The biggest change was to the ADAS configuration: all models were equipped with a new ATL LiDAR unit, 60% smaller and consuming 55% less power than the previous unit. The Pro trim was upgraded to a Horizon Robotics Journey 6M SoC (128 TOPS) with full capabilities, while the Max trim moved to a single NVIDIA Thor-U chip (700 TOPS). Both ran Li Auto's MindVLA ADAS software architecture. Li Auto said the updated system's automatic emergency braking could stop for stationary traffic in unlit nighttime conditions at up to 120 km/h (75 mph), and its automatic emergency steering could avoid a child entering the road at up to 130 km/h (81 mph).

The exterior gained a new Celadon Green special-edition paint option and four new 20- and 21-inch wheel designs. The interior received a new two-tone dark brown and black upholstery option.

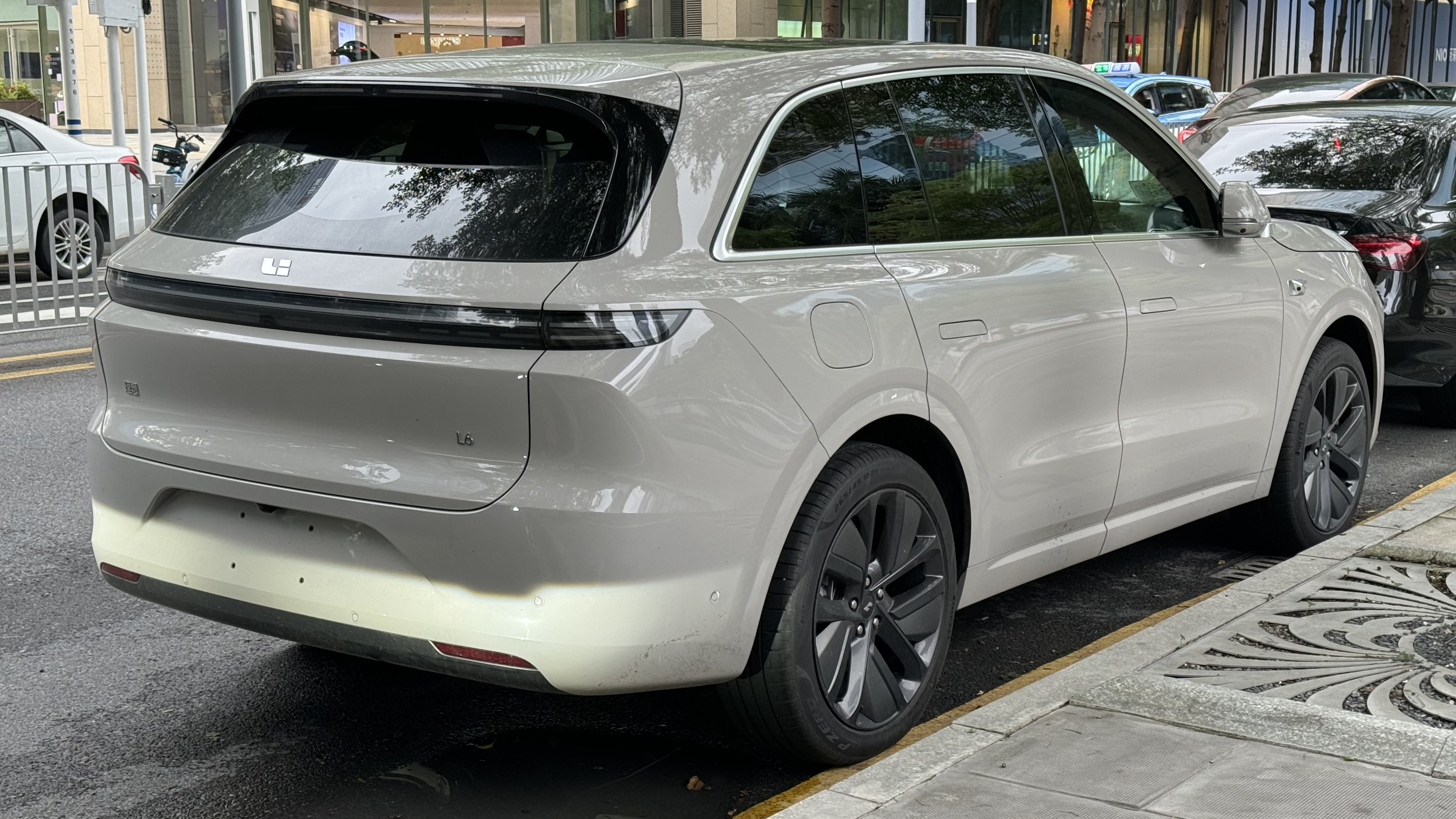
Rear view

=== Safety ===
C-NCAP (2024) test results 2024 Li L6 Max
Category		%
Overall:	5 /5 stars	90.5%
Occupant protection:		93.28%
Vulnerable road users:		85.50%
Active safety:		89.20%

=== Sales ===
The L6 received more than 10,000 pre-orders within 72 hours of its reveal. It exceeded 20,000 orders after 12 days, 30,000 after 16 days, and 41,000 on 5 May, 17 days after launch. It reached 100,000 deliveries on 19 September 2024, and 200,000 on 15 January 2025.

Following demand for the 2025 model, deliveries began 9 May 2025, reaching 10,000 units by 25 May. Deliveries fell sharply through 2025 and into 2026 as demand for the ageing first-generation model declined ahead of the second-generation launch, reaching a low of 915 units in June 2026, a year-on-year decline of 94.44%.

Month	2024	2025	2026
January		13,990	5,025
February		13,160	4,900
March		17,197	8,130
April	2,381	16,755	5,560
May	12,965	18,781	4,983
June	23,864	16,471	915
July	24,856	14,830	
August	24,897	11,217	
September	25,393	12,325	
October	25,814	9,680	
November	24,318	9,434	
December	27,769	12,676	
Total	192,257	165,933	—

== Second generation (2026) ==
Second generation
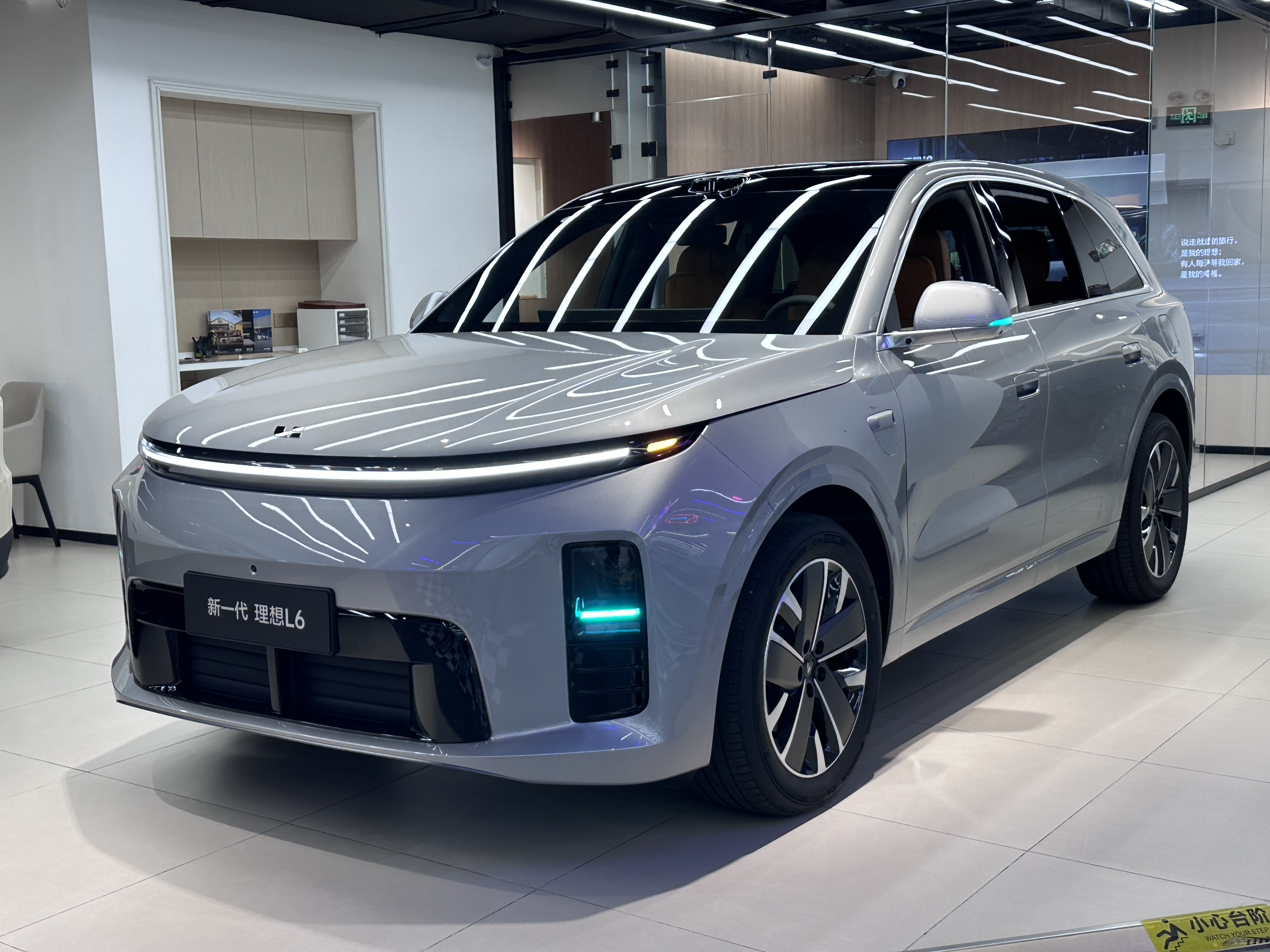

Overview
- Production: July 2026 – present
- Assembly: China: Changzhou, Jiangsu
- Designer: Ben Baum

Body and chassis
- Layout: Front-engine, dual-motor, four-wheel-drive

Powertrain
- Engine: Petrol range extender: 1.5 L L2E15M turbo I4
- Electric motor: Permanent magnet synchronous motor
- Power output: 300 kW (402 hp; 408 PS)
- Transmission: Single-speed gear reduction
- Battery: 51 kWh LFP (Sunwoda)
- Range: 1,250 km (780 mi) (CLTC); 1,040 km (650 mi) (WLTC)
- Electric range: 300 km (190 mi) (CLTC); 245 km (152 mi) (WLTC)
- Plug-in charging: DC fast charging: 260 kW (max); V2L: 3.5 kW

Dimensions
- Wheelbase: 2,920 mm (115.0 in)
- Length: 4,935 mm (194.3 in)
- Width: 1,960 mm (77.2 in)
- Height: 1,735 mm (68.3 in)
- Curb weight: 2,520 kg (5,556 lb)

=== Development ===
Details of the second-generation L6 first surfaced through a filing with China's Ministry of Industry and Information Technology (MIIT) on 9 May 2026, which revealed an extended body, revised front and rear styling, semi-flush door handles to comply with updated Chinese vehicle regulations, and an enlarged battery pack.

The revamped L6 was officially launched on 16 July 2026, offered in a single Ultra trim, replacing the previous Pro and Max trim structure. Li Auto held the vehicle's starting price unchanged from the outgoing generation despite reporting that rising costs for memory chips and lithium carbonate had increased the vehicle's per-unit production cost by more than 14,000 yuan, which the company opted to absorb rather than pass on. Buyers who ordered during the initial sales period received a complimentary front-row dual zero-gravity seat package, an exclusive custom body colour, and a black sport-styling kit.

The launch formed part of a wider renewal of Li Auto's EREV lineup, following updates to the Li L9 on 15 May 2026 and the Li L8 on 23 June 2026, the latter reducing its seating configuration from six to five. Li Auto founder and chief executive Li Xiang said he intended the new L6 to become the "king of experience" within its segment. The refresh followed a period of falling demand for the outgoing model.

=== Design ===
The second generation retains the same wheelbase as its predecessor but extends overall length by 10 mm (0.39 in). Revisions include a larger front grille, smoked tail-light lenses, reshaped bumpers, and semi-flush door handles. Seven exterior colours are offered, including newly introduced Dune Yellow, Wind Purple, and Obsidian Black finishes, alongside three two-tone interior colourways.

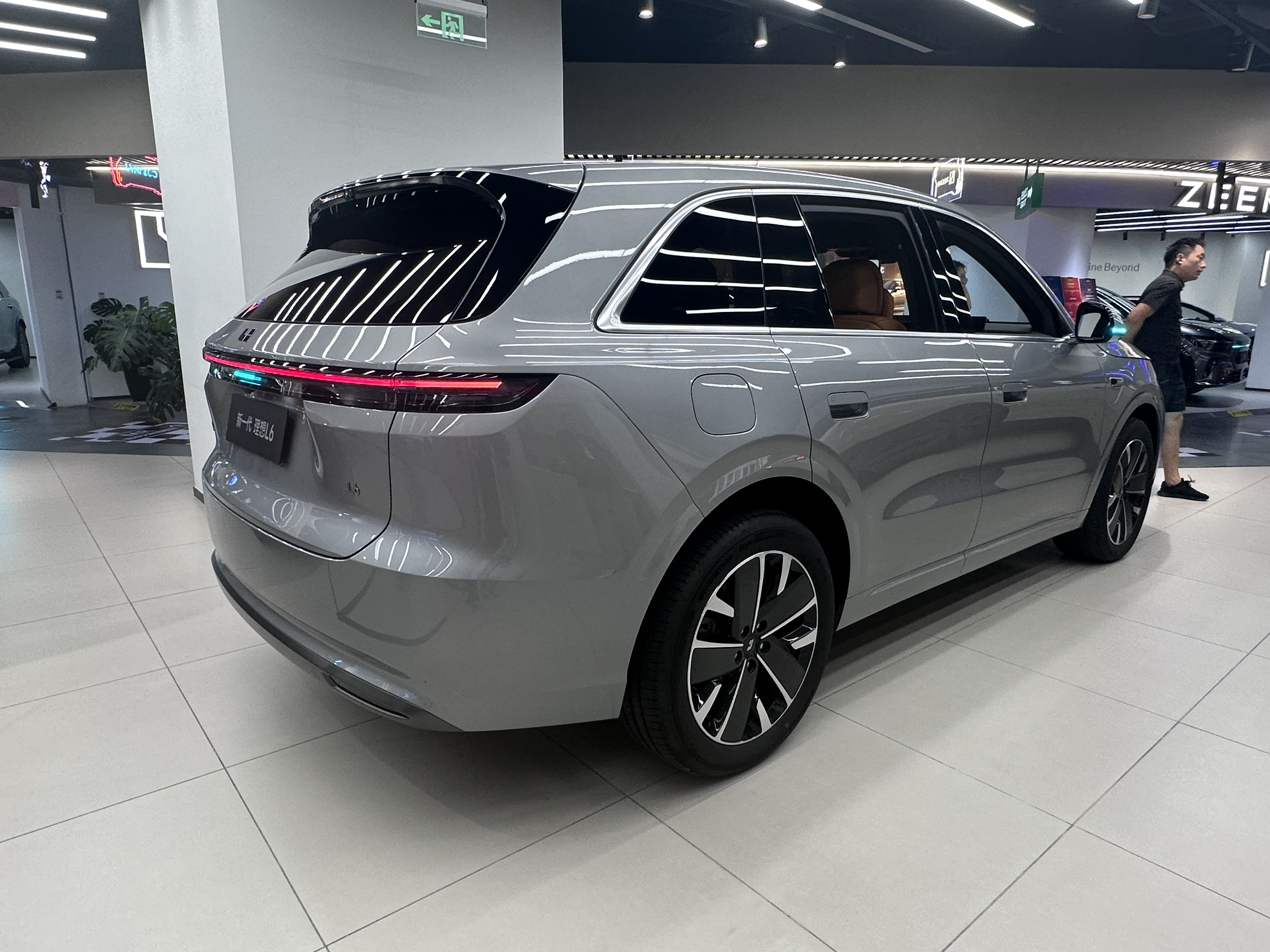
Rear view

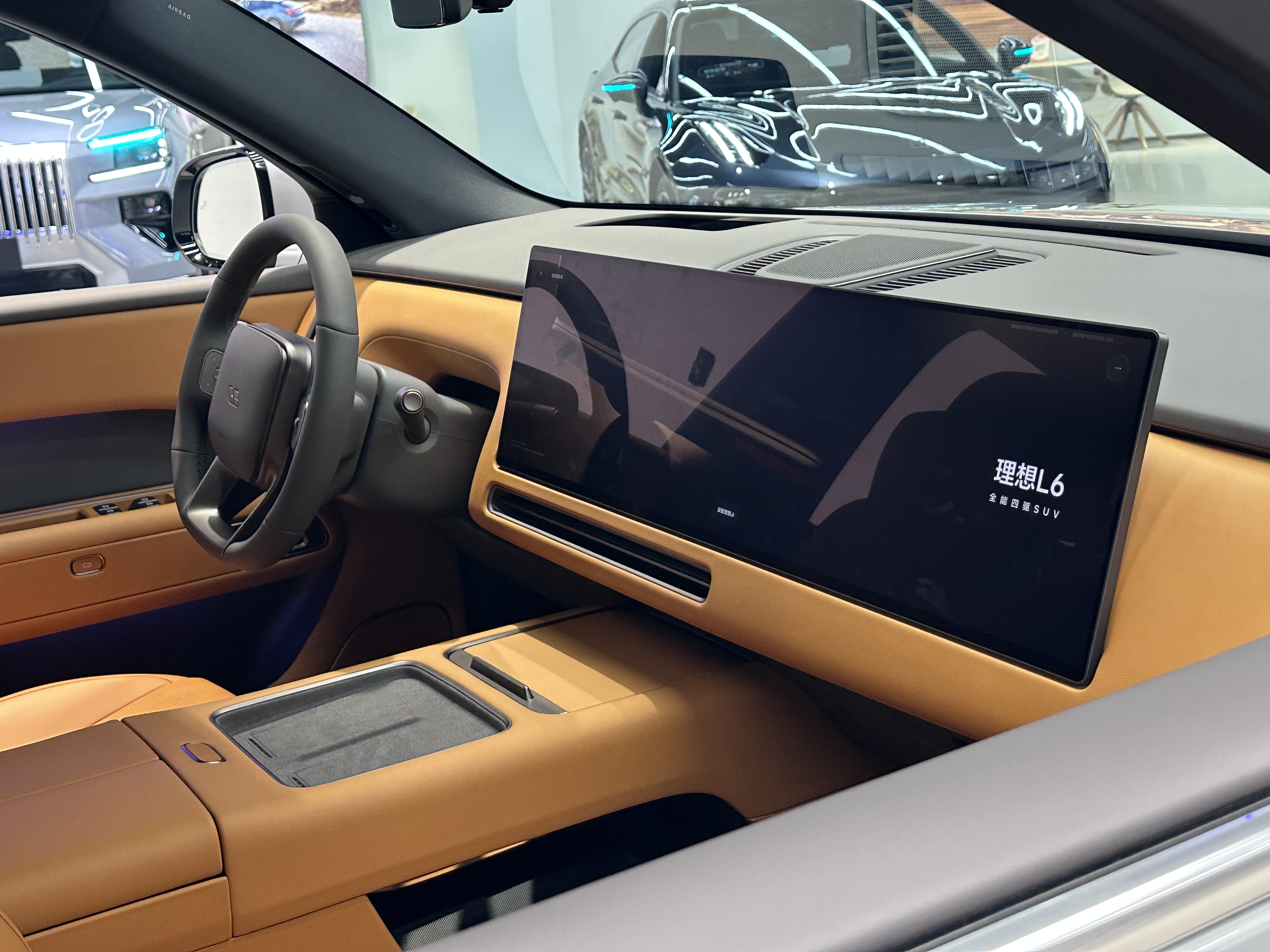
Interior

=== Interior and technology ===
The cabin is equipped with a 29-inch, 6K-resolution display spanning the centre console and front-passenger area, powered by a Qualcomm Snapdragon 8797 chip, a substantial upgrade over the first generation's dual 15.7-inch panels. An optional 21-inch, 4K rear-seat entertainment display is available. The infotainment system runs Li Auto's Star Ring OS and includes a five-zone natural-language voice assistant ("Li Tongxue"), gesture control, and facial and voice recognition. Audio is handled by a standard 19-speaker system in a 7.3.4 layout with Dolby Atmos support, upgradable to 21 speakers. Front zero-gravity seats are offered as an option, alongside heated, ventilated, and massaging front seats as standard.

=== Powertrain ===
The second-generation L6 retains the same 1.5-litre turbocharged L2E15M range-extender engine and dual-motor layout as its predecessor, with a 130 kW (170 hp; 180 PS) front motor and a 170 kW (230 hp; 230 PS) rear motor for a combined output of 300 kW (402 hp; 408 PS) (402 hp (300 kW; 408 PS)) and 529 N⋅m (390 lb⋅ft) of torque, giving an unchanged 0–100 km/h (62 mph) time of 5.4 seconds. The range-extender engine itself produces 154 hp (115 kW; 156 PS) gross (110 kW (148 hp; 150 PS) net).

Capacity increases from 36.8 kWh to 51 kWh, supplied by Sunwoda instead of CATL, using a new-generation LFP cell design optimised for extended-range applications, raising CLTC battery-only range from 212 km (132 mi) to 300 km (186 mi), while combined CLTC range with a full fuel tank rises to 1,250 km (777 mi). DC fast charging from 20–80% is reduced to 12 minutes, eight minutes faster than the previous generation.

=== Driver assistance ===
The second-generation L6 introduces Li Auto's in-house-developed Mach M100 assisted-driving chip, providing 1,280 TOPS of computing power, the same generation and chip used in the Li L9. An optional dual Mach M100 "embodied intelligence" package raises total compute to 2,560 TOPS and increases the LiDAR count from one to four units. The standard sensor suite includes a single Hesai ATL-P LiDAR, 11 cameras, one millimetre-wave radar, and eight ultra-wideband radar units, supporting SAE Level 2 assisted driving on urban roads and highways.
