= Li One =

Range-extender electric luxury mid-size crossover SUV

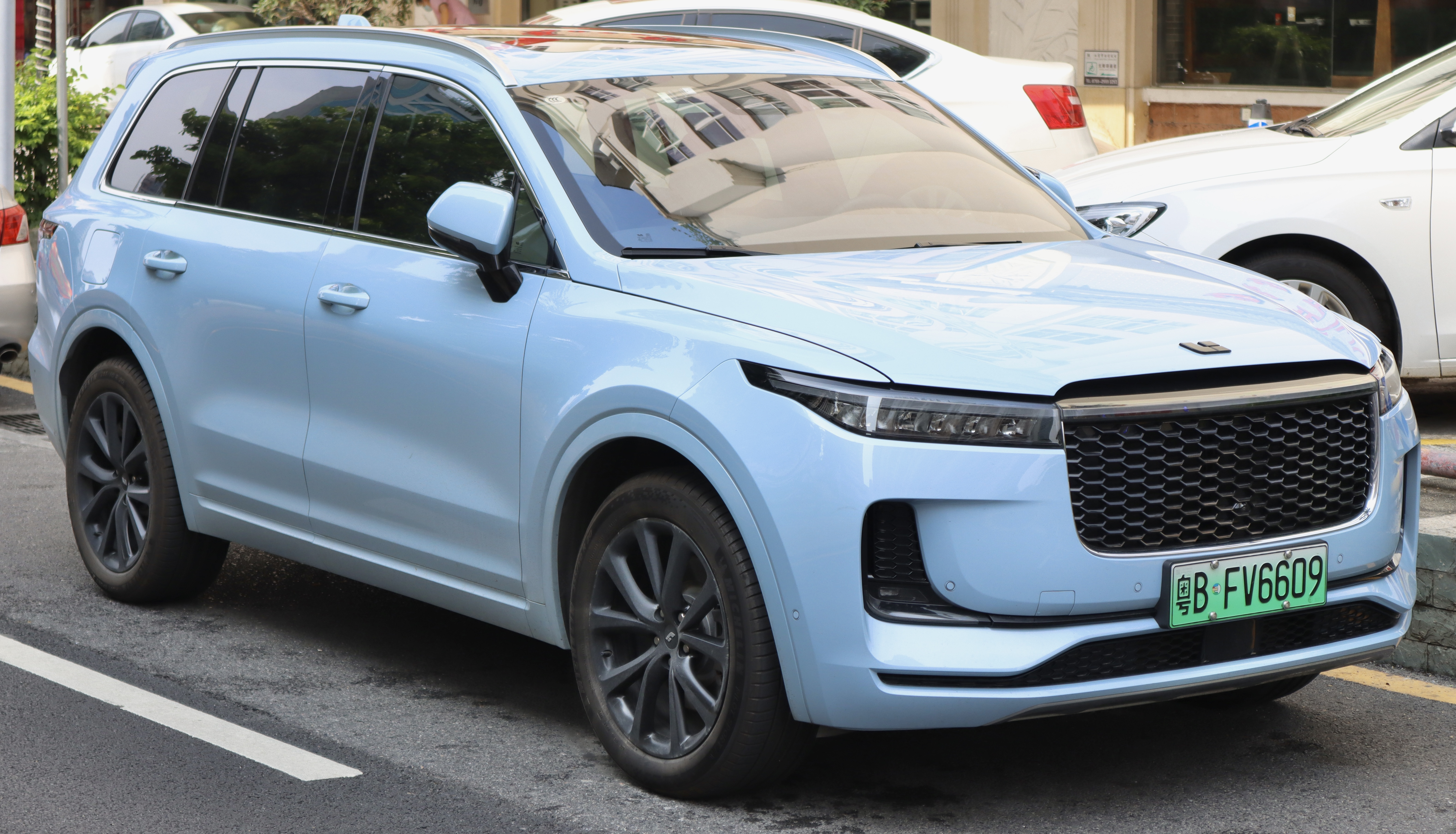

Overview
- Manufacturer: Li Auto
- Also called: Lixiang One
- Production: 2019–2022
- Assembly: China: Changzhou, Jiangsu
- Designer: Qiu Shi

Body and chassis
- Class: Mid-size luxury crossover SUV
- Body style: 5-door SUV
- Layout: Front-engine, dual-motor, four-wheel-drive

Powertrain
- Engine: Petrol range extender: 1.2 L DAM12TD I3 turbo
- Electric motor: permanent magnet synchronous motors
- Power output: 240 kW (320 hp)
- Transmission: Single-speed gear reduction
- Hybrid drivetrain: Series hybrid extended-range electric vehicle
- Battery: 40.6 kWh NMC CATL
- Range: 890–1,080 km (550–670 mi) (NEDC)
- Electric range: 155 km (96 mi) (WLTP); 188 km (117 mi) (NEDC)

Dimensions
- Wheelbase: 2,935 mm (115.6 in)
- Length: 5,020 mm (197.6 in)
- Width: 1,960 mm (77.2 in)
- Height: 1,760 mm (69.3 in)
- Curb weight: 2,300 kg (5,071 lb)

Chronology
- Successor: Li L8

The Li One (Chinese: 理想ONE; pinyin: Lǐxiǎng ONE; lit. 'ideal ONE', stylized in all caps) is a range-extender luxury mid-size crossover SUV produced by Chinese manufacturer Li Auto. It is the first production vehicle from the manufacturer.

As of 2021, it had the second-longest electric range of any plug-in hybrid in the world with 180 km (112 mi) on the NEDC cycle after the BMW i3 38 kWh REx with 203 km (126 mi) in the EPA cycle.

== History ==
The One was presented in April 2019 at the Shanghai Auto Show. It has been in series production in Changzhou since November 2019. The first vehicles were delivered in China from early 2020. After three years on the Chinese market, the Li One was discontinued in October 2022 to make way for the newer Li L8 which occupies the same segment.

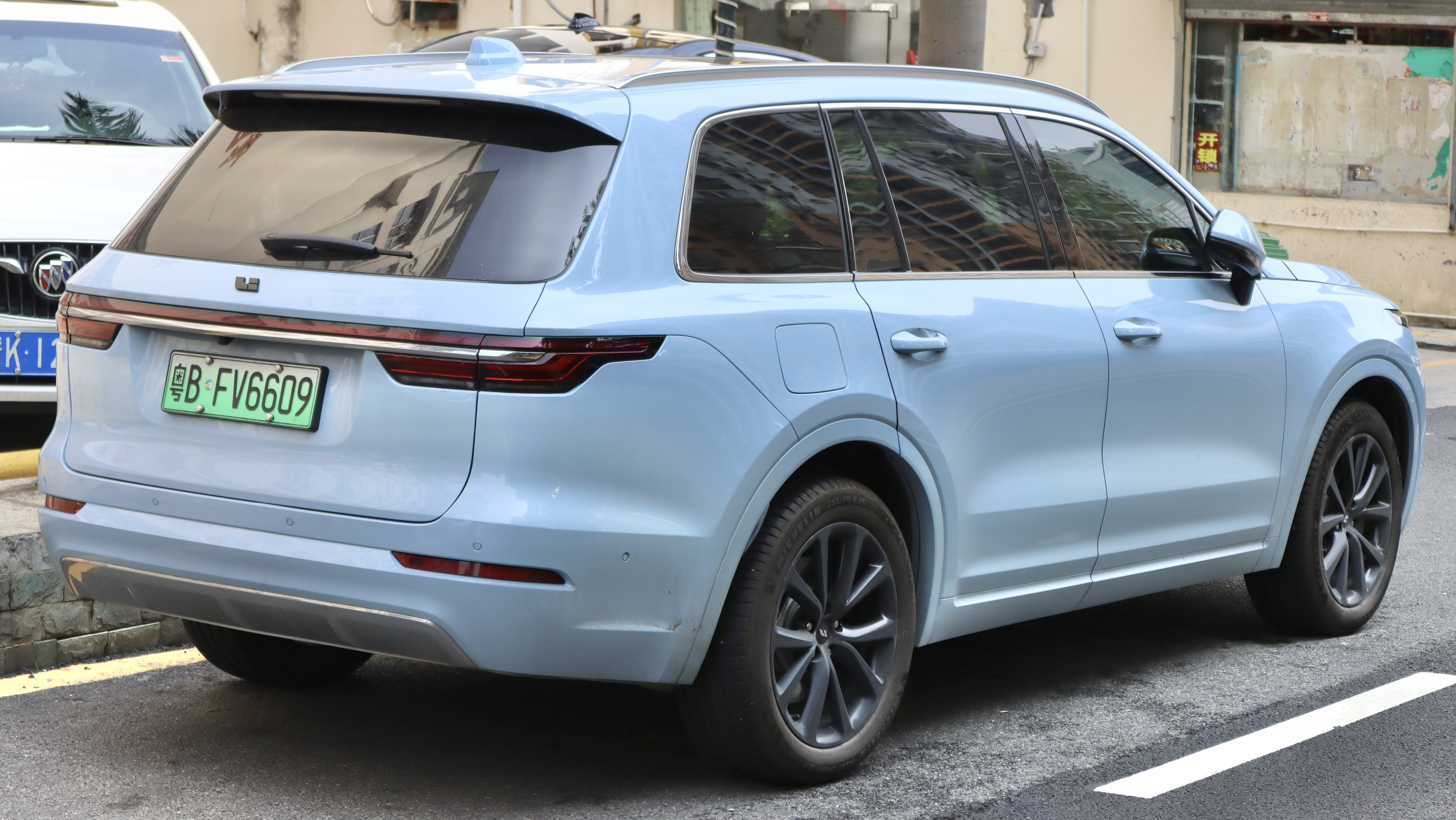
Rear view

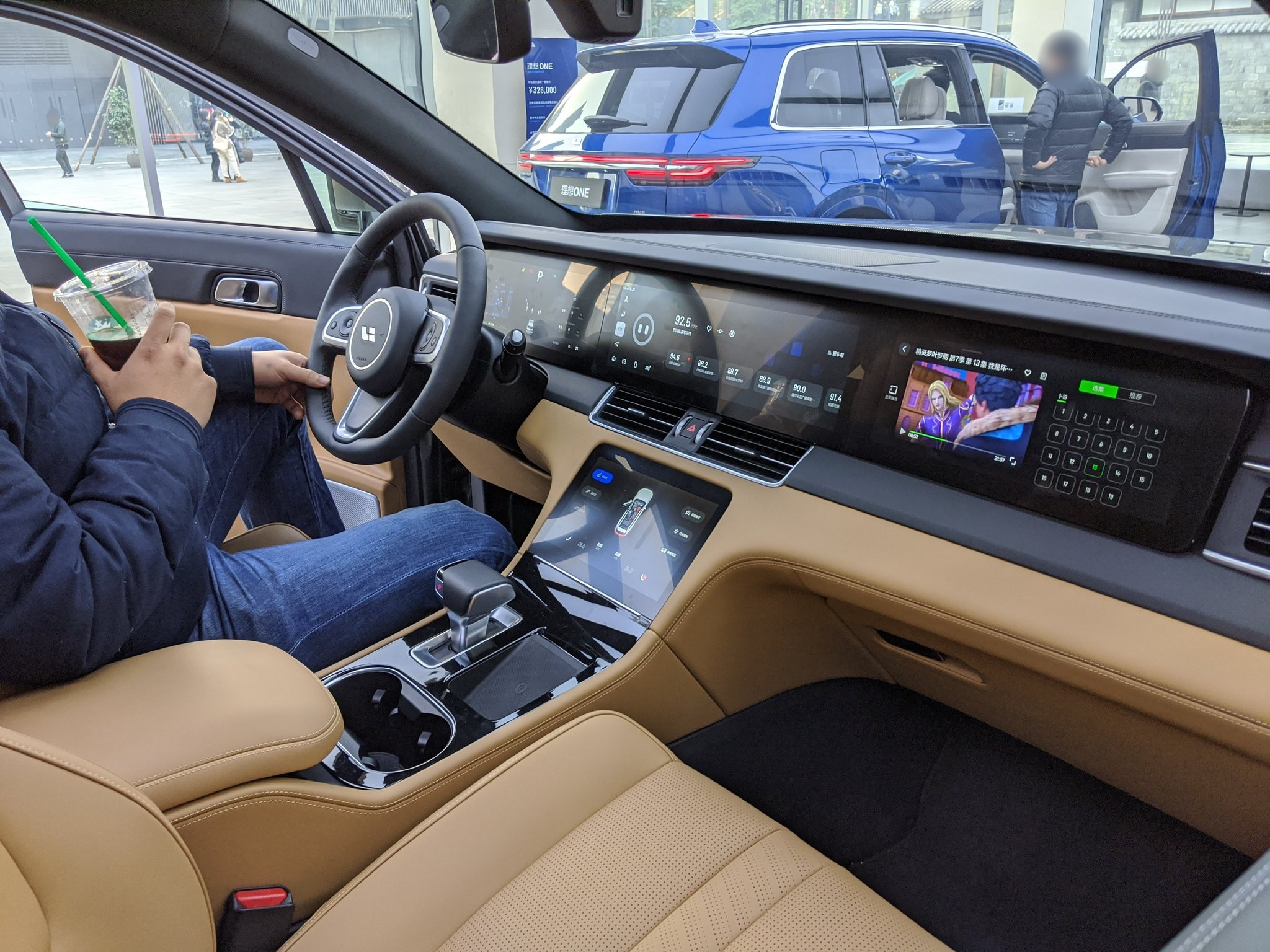
Interior

== Specifications ==
The Li One is a sport utility vehicle, available with six or seven seats in three rows. The interior has several screens, and the infotainment system runs on Android Automotive, powered by a Qualcomm Snapdragon 820A processor. The Li One will be equipped with a Level 2 ADAS system, powered by a Horizon Robotics Journey 3 SoC.

=== Powertrain ===
The Li One can be described as a range extended electric vehicle, which is a type of plug-in hybrid. It has two electric motors: a 100 kW (134 hp; 136 PS) motor at the front and a 140 kW (188 hp; 190 PS) motor in the rear, for a total output of 322 hp (240 kW; 326 PS) and 530 N⋅m (391 lb⋅ft) of torque. It is also equipped with a 129 hp (96 kW; 131 PS) front-mounted 1.2-litre turbocharged 3-cylinder petrol engine supplied by Dong'an Automotive. It has a 40.6 kWh (37.2 kWh usable) NMC battery pack supplied by CATL, which provides an electric-only NEDC range of 188 km (117 mi). When using the 45-litre (11.9 US gal) petrol tank, total range reaches 890 km (550 mi), which expands to 55 litres (14.5 US gal) and 1,080 km (670 mi) for the updated version. The petrol engine is a Range extender for the battery; it does not directly power the wheels. Charging to 80% takes 40 minutes with a fast charger, while a full charge on 200V AC power takes 6 hours.

Competing models include the BYD Tang plug-in hybrid, the BYD Tang 600/600D and the NIO ES8 (although the first one has a considerably smaller battery, and the two others are not plug-in hybrids but pure electric vehicles with much larger batteries).

The combination of a small internal combustion engine with a battery that is noticeably larger than in most plug-in hybrids resembles that of the BMW i3 REx.

== Safety ==
C-NCAP (2018) test results 2020 Li One 6-seater 4WD
Category		%
Overall:	5 /5 stars	92.2%
Occupant protection:		94.73%
Vulnerable road users:		72.89%
Active safety:		100.00%

== Sales ==
As of 1 April 2021, the vehicle sold in over 45,000 units in China since its market debut.

Among plug-in vehicles that retain an internal combustion engine (i.e., among plug-in hybrids and range extenders), the best-selling vehicle in China was the Li One in 2020 and in Q1 2021.

Year	China
2020	32,624
2021	90,491
2022	78,791
2023	9,576
Total	211,482
