= Sunwoda =

Chinese battery manufacturer

- Native name: 欣旺达电子股份有限公司
- Type: Public
- Traded as: SZSE: 300207; SIX Swiss Exchange: SWD
- Industry: Lithium-ion battery
- Founded: December 9, 1997
- Founders: Wang Mingwang; Wang Wei
- Headquarters: Shenzhen, China
- Area served: Worldwide
- Key people: Wang Wei, Chairman and General Manager
- Products: Consumer (3C) batteries, power batteries, energy storage batteries, energy services, smart hardware, ecosystem innovation
- Revenue: CN¥63.25 billion (2025)
- Website: sunwoda.com

Sunwoda Electronic Co., Ltd., commonly known as Sunwoda (Chinese: 欣旺达; pinyin: xīn wàng dá) is a Chinese technology company that specializes in the research and manufacture of lithium-ion battery modules. It is based in Shenzhen, China. It is one of the largest EV battery suppliers of China. By combined 2024 shipments of batteries for smartphones, notebook computers and tablets, Sunwoda ranked as the world's largest supplier in this product category. Separately, the company held a 34.3% share of the mobile-phone battery market. In the first half of 2026, the company ranked tenth globally by electric-vehicle battery installations, with 14.5 GWh installed and a 2.4% share of the market, according to figures reported by CnEVPost from SNE Research data.

== History ==
Sunwoda Electronic was founded on December 9, 1997 by Wang Mingwang and Wang Wei. The company began developing electric-vehicle batteries in 2008. In 2011, Sunwoda went public and was listed on the ChiNext exchange in Shenzhen on 21 April 2011.

In July 2025, Sunwoda filed an application to list its shares on the Hong Kong Stock Exchange. Goldman Sachs and CITIC Securities were named as joint sponsors of the proposed listing. In 2022, Sunwoda was listed in Benchmark's Tier 1 of Automotive-grade Battery Producers. In August 2023, Sunwoda announced that it was constructing an EV battery plant in Nyiregyhaza, northeast Hungary. In early 2025, LG Energy Solution won three patent infringement injunctions against Sunwoda. On 19 May 2026, the German Federal Patent Court ruled that European Patent EP 2 528 141 (EP141), asserted against Sunwoda by Tulip Innovation, was invalid in its entirety in Germany.

== Operations ==
Sunwoda is headquartered in Shenzhen and has production operations in China and India. Its production operations in Thailand and Vietnam are at different stages of development, including production capacity, commissioning and ramp-up, while its plant in Hungary remains under construction and its presence in Morocco is at an earlier development stage.

Sunwoda manufactures lithium-ion batteries for consumer electronics, including mobile phones and laptops, as well as power tools. Sunwoda's EV battery unit supplies products to automakers such as Dongfeng Motor Group, Geely, Volkswagen, Volvo Cars, and Li Auto.

According to CnEVPost, Sunwoda's consumer-battery customers include smartphone manufacturers such as Xiaomi, Oppo, Vivo and Honor. Its power-battery customers include Li Auto, XPeng, Leapmotor, SAIC Motor and Nissan.

Sunwoda's business comprises six segments: consumer (3C) batteries, power batteries, energy storage batteries, energy services, smart hardware and industrial ecosystem innovation.

In the first half of 2026, Sunwoda's electric-vehicle battery installations reached 14.5 GWh, a year-on-year increase of 13.7%, giving it a 2.4% share of the global market and tenth place among manufacturers, according to data from SNE Research reported by CnEVPost.

Sunwoda's energy-storage business also expanded during the first half of 2026. Industry reporting put energy-storage system shipments at 14.7 GWh, up 64.98% year on year, and revenue from the business at approximately CN¥1.77 billion, up 76.21%.

In August 2025, the European Commission approved €264 million in Hungarian state aid for the plant in Nyíregyháza. The proposed aid comprised a cash grant and a tax credit and was intended to support a planned investment of €1.43 billion. Euractiv reported that the project was expected to create more than 2,500 direct jobs and over 470 indirect jobs in the region.

== Finance and investments ==
In 2020, Sunwoda received regulatory approval for a convertible bond issue.

In 2022, Sunwoda's EV battery unit received a $1.17 billion Series A investment from Shenzhen Capital Group and National Green Development Fund Management. In November 2022, Sunwoda Electronic raised $440 million through a global depository receipt sale and was listed on the Swiss Stock Exchange.

For the 2025 financial year, Sunwoda reported revenue of approximately CN¥63.25 billion, an increase of 12.9% year on year. Net profit attributable to shareholders was approximately CN¥1.06 billion, according to reporting by Gasgoo and China's National Business Daily.

In the first half of 2026, the company reported revenue of approximately CN¥38.18 billion, up 41.48% year on year, while net profit attributable to shareholders fell 29.59% to approximately CN¥603 million.

In September 2026, Li Auto proposed investing CN¥2.65 billion in Sunwoda's power-battery subsidiary in exchange for an 8.79% stake. The transaction was reported as a proposed capital increase, rather than a completed acquisition. Li Auto-related entities would hold a combined 11.17% interest following completion, while Sunwoda would continue to control and consolidate the subsidiary, according to reporting by CnEVPost and Gasgoo.

== Subsidiaries ==
=== Sunwoda Electric Vehicle Battery ===
Sunwoda's electric-vehicle battery business dates to 2008.

== Awards and recognition ==
- 2024 Fortune China 500 ranked 332nd
- 2023 Fortune China 500 ranked 291st
- 2022 Fortune China 500 ranked 332nd
- 2021 Fortune China 500 ranked 344th
- 2020 Hurun China 500
- 2022 Hurun China 500
