= Range extender =

Fuel-based auxiliary power unit that extends the range of a battery electric vehicle

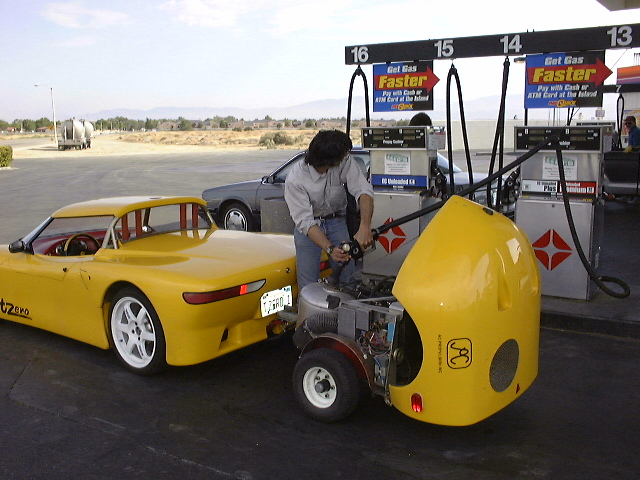
A prototype AC Propulsion tZero electric car with an external range-extender or genset trailer, 1999

A range extender is a fuel-based auxiliary power unit (APU) fitted to an electric vehicle that drives an electric generator to recharge the traction battery when it is depleted, thereby extending the vehicle's range beyond what the battery alone provides. This series configuration is known as a series hybrid drivetrain, in which the combustion source generates electricity rather than driving the wheels directly. The most commonly used range extenders are internal combustion engines, but fuel cells, microturbines, free-piston engines, and other generator types have also been developed.

Vehicles fitted with a range extender are referred to as extended-range electric vehicles (REEVs or EREVs).

== Types of range extender ==
=== Internal combustion engine ===
The great majority of deployed range extenders use a reciprocating internal combustion engine driving a generator. Because the engine in a series-hybrid configuration does not need to vary its output in line with vehicle speed or load, as that task is handled by the electric motor and battery, the engine can be sized to the vehicle's average power requirement rather than its peak demand, and can operate at or near its most thermally efficient rotational speed. This reduces fuel consumption during range-extension operation and, compared to a conventional drivetrain engine subjected to varying loads, reduces wear.

Engine displacements in automotive range extenders have typically been 0.6–1.5 litres for passenger vehicles. Mazda used a compact Wankel engine of 830 cc in the MX-30 R-EV, taking advantage of the rotary engine's compactness relative to its power output. Heavy-duty applications such as pickup trucks have used larger engines. For example, the Ram 1500 REV uses a 3.6-litre V6 petrol engine as its generator.

==== Wankel and rotary engines ====
The Wankel engine has attracted interest as a range extender because of its high power-to-weight ratio and compact dimensions relative to displacement. It operates most efficiently at constant speed, making the generator-only application in an extended-range electric vehicle a better fit than in a conventional drivetrain where varying speed demands reduce rotary engine efficiency. Mazda deployed a production Wankel range extender in the MX-30 R-EV and has conducted research into hydrogen-fuelled rotary range extenders.

==== Free-piston linear generator ====
A free-piston linear generator (FPLG) replaces the conventional crankshaft-and-rod mechanism with a piston that oscillates freely between combustion and rebound chambers, driving a linear alternator directly. The absence of the crankshaft eliminates friction losses associated with converting linear to rotary motion, and the device can accept a wider range of fuels including hydrogen and biofuels. Free-piston designs have demonstrated higher efficiencies and lower noise, vibration, and harshness than equivalent crankshaft engines in laboratory conditions, though as of 2025 no free-piston range extender had entered production.

=== Microturbine ===
Microturbines offer a high power-to-weight ratio and the ability to run on multiple fuels, including natural gas, biogas, and hydrogen, while producing low emissions. A 35 kW microturbine range extender has been estimated to be approximately 50% lighter and 40% smaller than an equivalent piston engine, with thermal efficiency of 30–35%. Turbines operate most efficiently at steady, constant speed, making the generator-only role in a range-extended vehicle a better match than variable-speed automotive applications. Engineering organisations including Delta Motorsport (with Cosworth) and Wrightspeed have developed automotive microturbine range extenders; no microturbine-based range extender had entered volume passenger-vehicle production as of 2025, though the technology has been demonstrated in commercial truck applications.

=== Fuel cell ===
A fuel cell converts hydrogen or other fuel directly to electricity through an electrochemical reaction, without combustion. Fuel cells are more efficient than combustion engines in steady-state generation and produce no local emissions when using hydrogen. Hydrogen fuel cells have been used as range extenders in battery electric buses — for example, the Mercedes-Benz eCitaro fuel-cell variant achieves a range of approximately 400 km (250 mi) compared to 280 km (170 mi) for the battery-only version, using a 60 kW Toyota fuel cell to recharge the battery. Practical barriers to fuel-cell range extenders in passenger vehicles include limited hydrogen refuelling infrastructure, the cost of fuel cell stacks, and the challenges of on-board hydrogen storage.

== Generations ==
The development of range-extender technology is broadly categorised into three generations based on the type of prime mover:

- First generation: off-the-shelf reciprocating internal combustion engines adapted for generator duty.
- Second generation: purpose-designed engines optimised for the constant-load, constant-speed generator role in series hybrids, including Wankel engines, rotary combustion engines, and free-piston engines with integral electricity generation.
- Third generation: microturbines and fuel cells operating at constant load, offering higher efficiency and lower emissions than piston-based approaches but at greater complexity and cost.

== Regulations ==
=== North America ===
==== CARB BEVx ====
Under 2012 amendments to the Zero Emission Vehicle Regulations adopted by the California Air Resources Board (CARB), a range-extended battery-electric vehicle designated as BEVx must meet the following criteria:

- The vehicle must have a rated all-electric range of at least 120 km (75 miles), higher than the 50 mi (80 kilometres) required of a zero-emission vehicle;
- The APU must provide additional range less than or equal to the battery range;
- The APU must not engage until the battery has been depleted;
- The vehicle must meet super ultra low emission vehicle (SULEV) requirements; and
- The APU and all associated fuel systems must comply with zero evaporative emission requirements.

The 2014 BMW i3 with its optional range-extender unit was the first vehicle to receive BEVx certification.

=== China ===
GB 36980.1-2025 applies to all fully electric and hybrid vehicles in China, including range-extended models, and requires a minimum electric range of 100 kilometres (60 mi) and fuel consumption limits in battery-retention mode set as a percentage of the limit under GB 19578-2024 depending on vehicle kerb weight.

== Applications ==
=== Automotive ===
The principal automotive application of range extenders is the extended-range electric vehicle, where the APU charges a large battery that exclusively drives the traction motor.

Range extenders have also been proposed for battery electric versions of vehicles with high range requirements that are difficult to meet economically with batteries alone, including heavy pickup trucks and large SUVs. Ford holds patents for a bed-mounted petrol generator for its electric trucks.

=== Marine ===
Range extenders in the form of diesel-electric generator sets have long been used in marine diesel-electric vessels, where a diesel engine drives a generator and electric motors propel the vessel — a configuration functionally identical to a series hybrid road vehicle. The arrangement allows the diesel engine to operate at its most efficient speed independent of propeller demand.

=== Buses ===
Hydrogen fuel cells have been deployed as range extenders for battery electric buses, allowing longer intercity routes not achievable by battery power alone. The Mercedes-Benz eCitaro fuel-cell variant uses a 60 kW Toyota fuel cell to recharge its battery, extending range from 280 km (170 mi) to 400 km (250 mi). Series plug-in hybrid arrangements using an ICE range extender have been used in hybrid buses such as Wrightbus's Gemini 2 and the New Routemaster.

=== Unmanned aerial vehicles ===
Range extenders have been evaluated for unmanned aerial vehicles (UAVs) where battery weight limits endurance. The 2010 Wolverine 3 programme used an ICE range extender to extend UAV flight time beyond what its batteries could support alone.

== See also ==
- Extended-range electric vehicle
- Plug-in hybrid electric vehicle
- Series hybrid
- Hybrid vehicle drivetrain
- Fuel cell vehicle
- Microturbines
