= List of automotive assembly plants in the United States =

This is a list of automotive assembly plants in the United States.

== General Motors ==
Plant Name	Address	Products
Arlington Assembly	2525 E Abram St. Arlington, Texas 76010	Cadillac Escalade, Cadillac Escalade ESV, Chevrolet Tahoe, Chevrolet Suburban, GMC Yukon, GMC Yukon XL
Bowling Green Assembly	600 Corvette Drive Bowling Green, Kentucky 42101	Chevrolet Corvette
Detroit/Hamtramck Assembly	2500 East Grand Blvd. Detroit, Michigan 48211	Chevrolet Silverado EV, GMC Sierra EV, Cadillac Escalade IQ, GMC Hummer EV
Fairfax Assembly	3201 Fairfax Trafficway, Kansas City, Kansas 66115	Chevrolet Bolt EV, Chevrolet Equinox, Buick Envision (2028)
Flint Truck Assembly	3100 Vanslyke Rd. Flint, Michigan 48551	Chevrolet Silverado, GMC Sierra
Fort Wayne Assembly	12200 Lafayette Center Rd. Roanoke, Indiana 46783	Chevrolet Silverado, GMC Sierra
Lansing Delta Township Assembly	8175 Millett Hwy. Lansing, Michigan 48921	Buick Enclave, Chevrolet Traverse, GMC Acadia
Lansing Grand River Assembly	920 Townsend St. Lansing, Michigan 48921	Cadillac CT5
Orion Assembly	4555 Giddings Rd. Lake Orion, Michigan 48359	Chevrolet Silverado, GMC Sierra, Cadillac Escalade
Spring Hill Manufacturing	100 Saturn Prky. Spring Hill, Tennessee 37174	Cadillac Lyriq, Cadillac Vistiq, Chevrolet Blazer (crossover)
Wentzville Assembly	1500 East Route A. Wentzville, Missouri 63385	Chevrolet Express, GMC Savana, Chevrolet Colorado, GMC Canyon

== Ford Motor Company ==
Plant Name	Address	Products
Flat Rock Assembly Plant	1 International Dr. Flat Rock, Michigan 48134	Ford Mustang
Chicago Assembly	12600 S Torrance Ave. Chicago, Illinois 60633	Ford Explorer, Lincoln Aviator
Dearborn Truck	3001 Miller Rd. Dearborn, Michigan 48120	Ford F-150
Kansas City Assembly	8121 NE 69th Hwy. Claycomo, Missouri 64068	Ford F-150, Ford Transit
Kentucky Truck Plant	3001 Chamberlain Ln. Louisville, Kentucky 40241	Ford Super Duty, Ford Expedition & Expedition Max, Lincoln Navigator & Navigator L
Louisville Assembly Plant	2000 Fern Valley Rd. Louisville, Kentucky 40213	
Michigan Assembly Plant	37625 Michigan Ave. Wayne, Michigan 48184	Ford Ranger, Ford Bronco
Ohio Assembly	650 Miller Rd. Avon Lake, Ohio 44012	Ford F-650, Ford Super Duty (Chassis Cab), Ford E-Series (Econoline) Cutaway/Strip Chassis

== Stellantis ==
Plant Name	Address	Products
Detroit Assembly Complex - Jefferson	2101 Conner Avenue. Detroit, Michigan 48215	Jeep Grand Cherokee, Dodge Durango
Sterling Heights Assembly	38111 Van Dyke. Sterling Heights, Michigan 48312	Ram 1500
Toledo Complex	4400 Chrysler Dr. Toledo, Ohio 43608	Jeep Wrangler, Jeep Gladiator
Warren Truck Assembly	21500 Mound Rd. Warren, Michigan 48091	Jeep Grand Wagoneer
Detroit Assembly Complex – Mack	4000 St. Jean Avenue, Detroit, Michigan 48214	Jeep Grand Cherokee
Belvidere Assembly Plant	3000 West Chrysler Drive, Belvidere, Illinois 61008	Jeep Cherokee (KM), Jeep Compass

== Tesla ==
Plant Name	Address	Products
Tesla Factory	45500 Fremont Blvd. Fremont, California 94538	Tesla Model 3, Tesla Model Y
Gigafactory Texas	13101 Tesla Road, Austin, Texas 78725	Tesla Cybertruck, Tesla Model Y, Tesla Cybercab
Gigafactory Nevada	1 Electric Ave, Sparks, Nevada 89437	Tesla Semi

== Rivian ==
Plant Name	Address	Products
Rivian Normal Illinois Factory	100 Rivian Motorway, Normal, Illinois 61761	Rivian R1T, Rivian R1S, Rivian R2, Rivian EDV
Rivian Georgia Factory	TBA	TBA

== Lucid Motors ==
Plant Name	Address	Products
Lucid AMP-1	317 S Thornton Rd, Casa Grande, Arizona 85193	Lucid Air, Lucid Gravity

== Slate Auto ==
Plant Name	Address	Products
TBA	Warsaw, Indiana	Slate Truck (Q42026)

== Toyota ==
Plant Name	Address	Products
Toyota Motor Manufacturing Kentucky	1001 Cherry Blossom Way Georgetown, Kentucky 40324	Toyota Camry, Toyota RAV4, Lexus TZ
Toyota Motor Manufacturing Indiana	4000 Tulip Tree Drive, P.O. Box 4000 Princeton, Indiana 47670	Toyota Sienna, Toyota Highlander, Toyota Grand Highlander, Lexus TX
Toyota Motor Manufacturing Texas	One Lone Star Pass San Antonio, Texas 78264	Toyota Tundra, Toyota Sequoia, Toyota Tacoma (Future)
Toyota Motor Manufacturing Mississippi	1200 Magnolia Dr. Blue Springs, Mississippi 38828	Toyota Corolla
Mazda Toyota Manufacturing USA	9000 Greenbrier Pkwy. Madison, Alabama 35756	Toyota Corolla Cross, Mazda CX-50

== Honda ==
Plant Name	Address	Products
Honda of America Manufacturing, Inc. Marysville Auto Plant	24000 Honda Pkwy. Marysville, Ohio 43040	Honda Accord, Acura Integra
Honda of America Manufacturing, Inc. East Liberty Auto Plant	11000 Ohio 347, East Liberty, Ohio 43319	Honda CR-V, Acura RDX, Acura MDX
Honda Manufacturing of Alabama, LLC	1800 Honda Dr. Lincoln, Alabama 35096	Honda Odyssey, Honda Passport, Honda Pilot, Honda Ridgeline
Honda Manufacturing of Indiana, LLC	2755 N. Michigan Ave, Greensburg, Indiana 47240	Honda Civic, Honda CR-V
Honda of America Manufacturing, Inc. New Ohio plant		TBD

== Nissan ==
Plant Name	Address	Products
Nissan North America, Inc. Smyrna	983 Nissan Dr. Smyrna, Tennessee 37167	Nissan Rogue, Nissan Pathfinder, Nissan Murano, Infiniti QX60, Infiniti QX65
Nissan North America, Inc. Canton	300 Nissan Dr. Canton, Mississippi 39046	Nissan Altima, Nissan Frontier

== Mazda ==
Plant Name	Address	Products
Mazda Toyota Manufacturing USA	9000 Greenbrier Pkwy. Madison, Alabama 35756	Mazda CX-50, Toyota Corolla Cross

== Subaru ==
Plant Name	Address	Products
Subaru of Indiana Automotive, Inc.	5500 Indiana 38 Lafayette, Indiana 47905	Subaru Forester, Subaru Crosstrek, Subaru Ascent

== Hyundai Motor Company ==
Plant Name	Address	Products
Hyundai Motor Manufacturing Alabama	700 Hyundai Blvd. Montgomery, Alabama 36105	Hyundai Tucson, Hyundai Santa Fe, Hyundai Santa Cruz, Genesis GV70 (ICE & EV)
Hyundai Motor Group Metaplant America	71500 Genesis Dr. Ellabell, Georgia 31308	Hyundai Ioniq 5, Hyundai Ioniq 9

== Kia ==
Plant Name	Address	Products
Kia Motors Manufacturing Georgia	7777 Kia Pkwy, West Point, Georgia 31833	Kia EV6, Kia Sportage, Kia Sorento, Kia Telluride, Kia EV9

== Volkswagen Group ==
Plant Name	Address	Products
Volkswagen Chattanooga Assembly Plant	8001 Volkswagen Dr. Chattanooga, Tennessee 37416	Volkswagen Atlas, Volkswagen Atlas Cross Sport, Volkswagen ID.4
Scout Production Center (2026)	Blythewood, South Carolina	Scout Traveler, Scout Terra
Audi AG	Macon, Georgia	TBD (2030)

== Volvo Cars ==
Plant Name	Address	Products
Volvo Cars USA LLC	3290 Volvo Car Dr. Ridgeville, South Carolina 29472	Volvo EX90, Polestar 3, Volvo XC60

== VinFast ==
Plant Name	Address	Products
VinFast USA	Chatham County, North Carolina (2028)	TBA

== BMW ==
Plant Name	Address	Products
BMW US Manufacturing Company, LLC	1400 Hwy 101 S. Greer, South Carolina 29651	BMW X3, BMW X4, BMW X5, BMW X6, BMW X7

== Mercedes-Benz Group ==
Plant Name	Address	Products
Mercedes-Benz U.S. International, Inc.	1 Mercedes Dr. Vance, Alabama 35490	Mercedes-Benz GLC-Class, Mercedes-Benz GLE-Class, Mercedes-Benz GLS-Class, Mercedes-Benz EQE SUV, Mercedes-Benz EQS SUV
Mercedes-Benz Vans, LLC.	8501 Palmetto Commerce Pkwy, Ladson, South Carolina 29456	Mercedes-Benz Sprinter

== Archion ==
Plant Name	Address	Products
Hino Motors Manufacturing U.S.A., Inc.	1 Hino Way Williamstown, West Virginia 26187	Class 6 & 7 Medium Duty Trucks (GVWR: 16,001 - 33,000 lbs.), Specialized Trucks

== See also ==
- Automotive industry in the United States
- List of former automotive manufacturing plants
