= Rox Motor =

Chinese automobile company

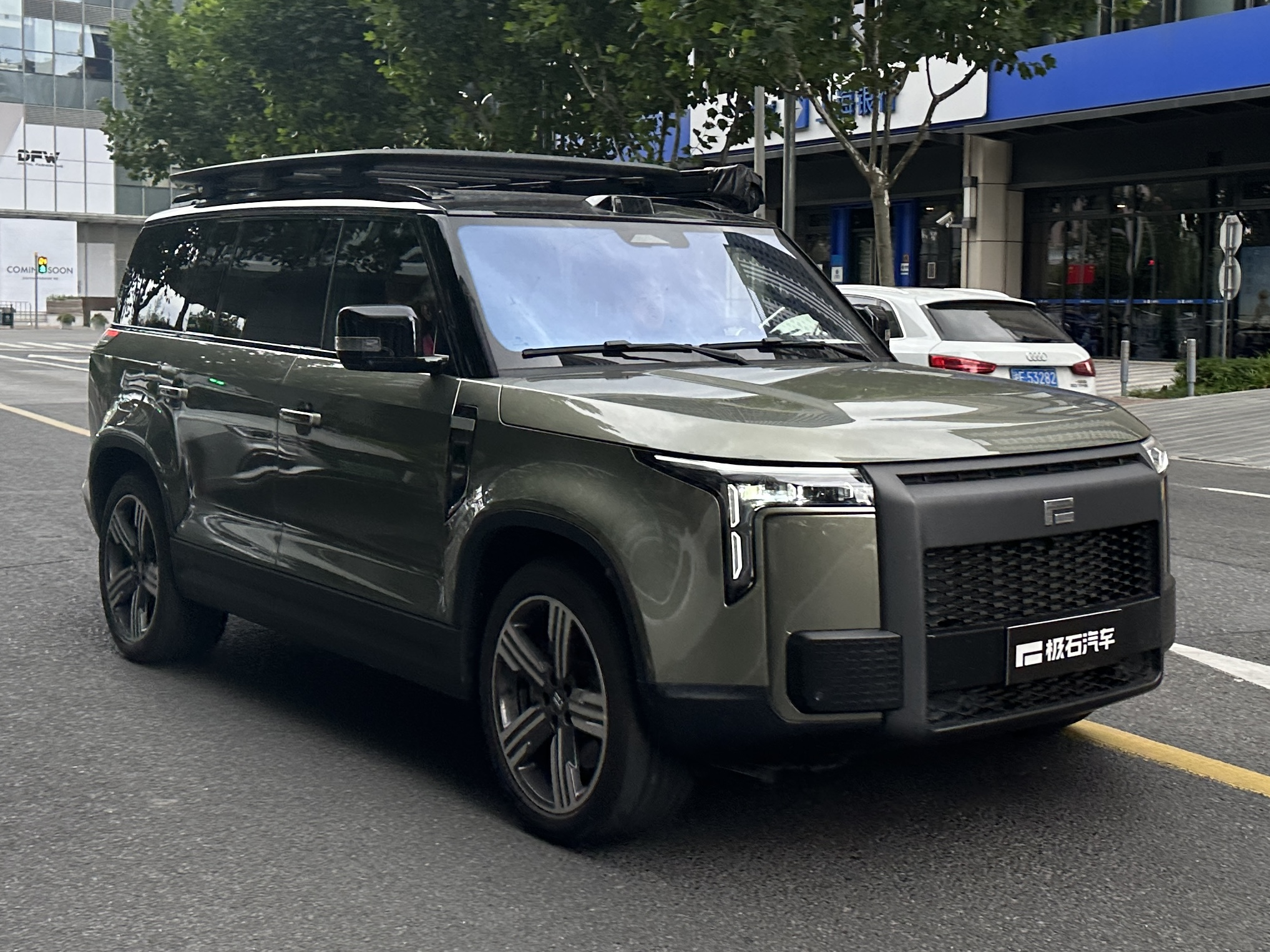
- Native name: 极石汽车
- Formerly: Polar Stone (Jishi); Polestones Automobile (极石)
- Industry: Automotive
- Founded: 2023
- Headquarters: Shanghai, China
- Key people: Chang Jin (chairman)
- Number of employees: 600 (2023)
- Website: https://www.roxmotor.com/

Rox Motor (Chinese 极石汽车) is a Chinese hybrid cars manufacturer headquartered in Shanghai, founded in 2023. Previously known as Polestones Automobile (极石) or Polar Stone (Jishi) till 2024.

== History ==
In 2021, Chinese entrepreneur Zhang Jin, founder of vacuum cleaner company Roborock, with the support of Xiaomi — invested the proceeds into Shanghai startup ROX Motor. The goal was to introduce the production of electrified, high-tech cars made of aluminum. During the first year, 1,800 people were hired. At the same time, contracts for technological cooperation were signed with companies such as Bosch, CATL, Continental AG and Valeo. The first prototype tests began in November 2022, and in June 2023, the first official information about the technical characteristics of the car was provided by Rox Motor, in whose development the company BAW took part.

The first ROX Motor model was officially unveiled in August 2023 at the Beijing Auto Show, when it was announced that it would be produced by Polestones Automobile, a division of ROX Motor. Serial production of the vehicle began in late October 2023 under a technology cooperation agreement with BAW, and deliveries began in November 2023.

In 2025, the Rox Motors brand was introduced initially in the Middle East and later in Africa and Central Asia.

Rox Motors was awarded the '2025 Oman's Most Trusted Brand' award in the EV Brand category.

== Models ==
- Rox 01 (2023–present) - mid-size extended-range SUV.
  - Rox Adamas (2025–present) - Full-size extended-range SUV. Luxury version of the 01.
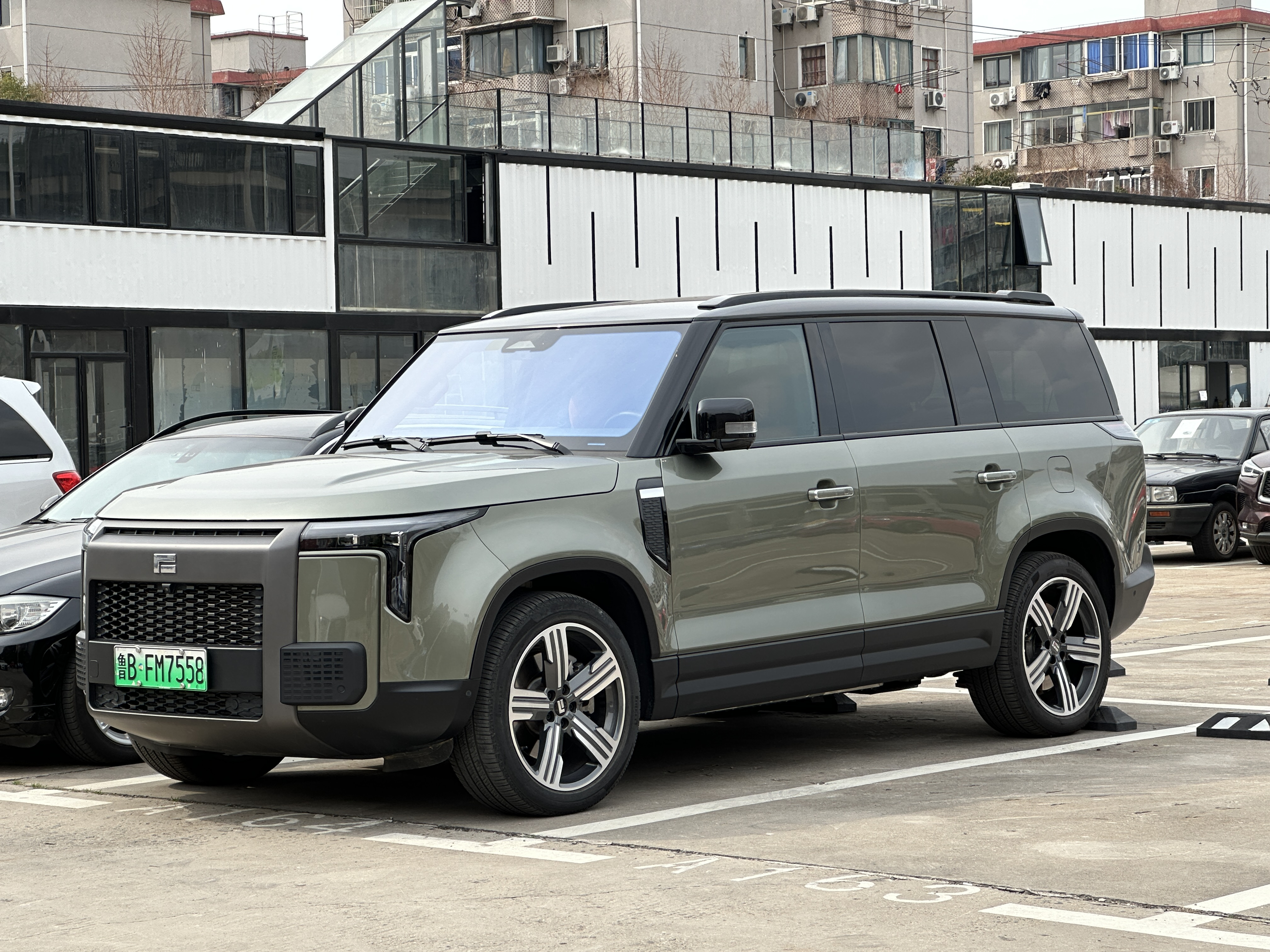
Rox 01

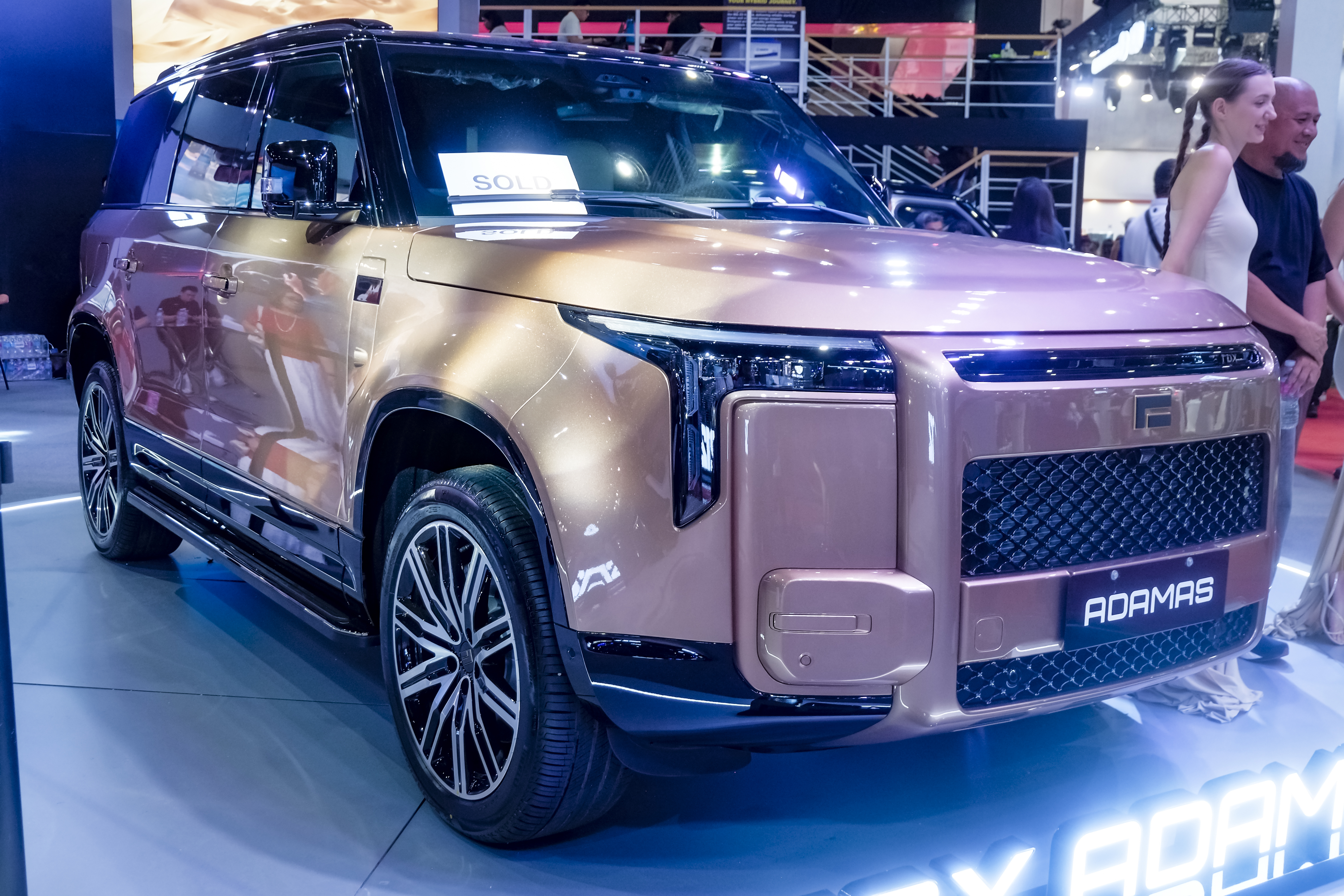
Rox Adamas
