= Rox 01 =

Range extender full-size SUV

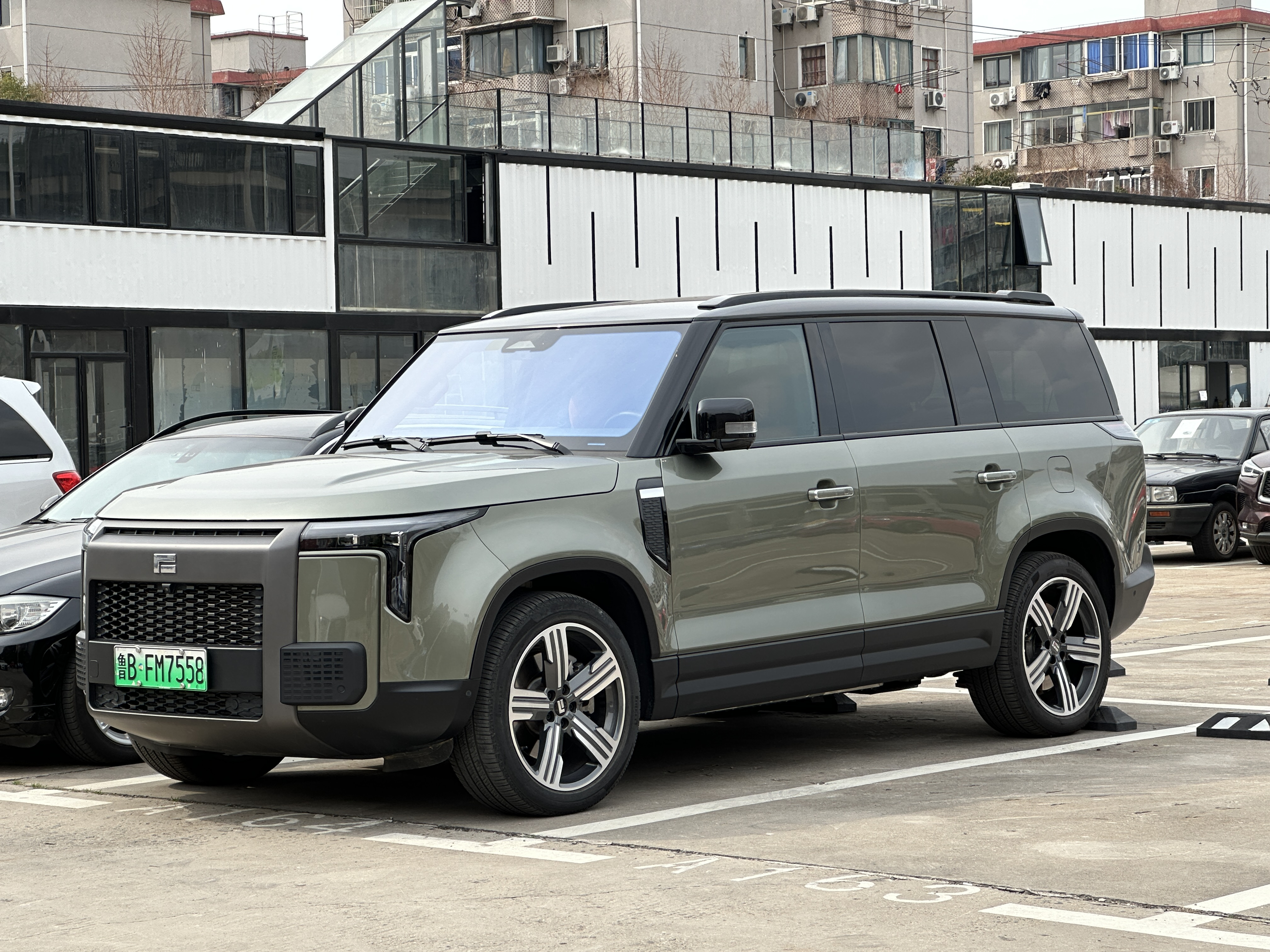

Overview
- Manufacturer: Rox Motor
- Also called: Polestones 01; Rox Adamas (facelift)
- Production: October 2023 – present
- Assembly: China: Beijing; UAE: Abu Dhabi
- Designer: Pininfarina

Body and chassis
- Class: Full-size SUV (E)
- Body style: 5-door SUV
- Layout: Front-engine, front-motor, front-wheel-drive; Front-engine, dual-motor, all-wheel-drive

Powertrain
- Engine: 1.5 L SGMW B15F turbocharged I4 (Generator only)
- Electric motor: 1 or 2 Permanent magnet synchronous
- Power output: Engine: 115 kW (154 hp; 156 PS); Motor: 150 kW (200 hp; 200 PS) (FWD); 350 kW (470 hp; 480 PS) (AWD)
- Battery: 44.5 – 58.4 kWh Ternary lithium battery (NMC) from CATL
- Electric range: 215–235 km (133.6–146.0 mi)

Dimensions
- Wheelbase: 3,010 mm (118.5 in)
- Length: 5,050–5,289 mm (198.8–208.2 in)
- Width: 1,980 mm (78.0 in)
- Height: 1,856–1,869 mm (73.1–73.6 in)
- Curb weight: 2,735 kg (6,030 lb)

The Rox 01 (Chinese: 极石01), also known as the Polestones 01, or as the Rox Adamas is a range extender full-size SUV produced by Chinese automobile manufacturer Rox Motor since 2023.

== Overview ==
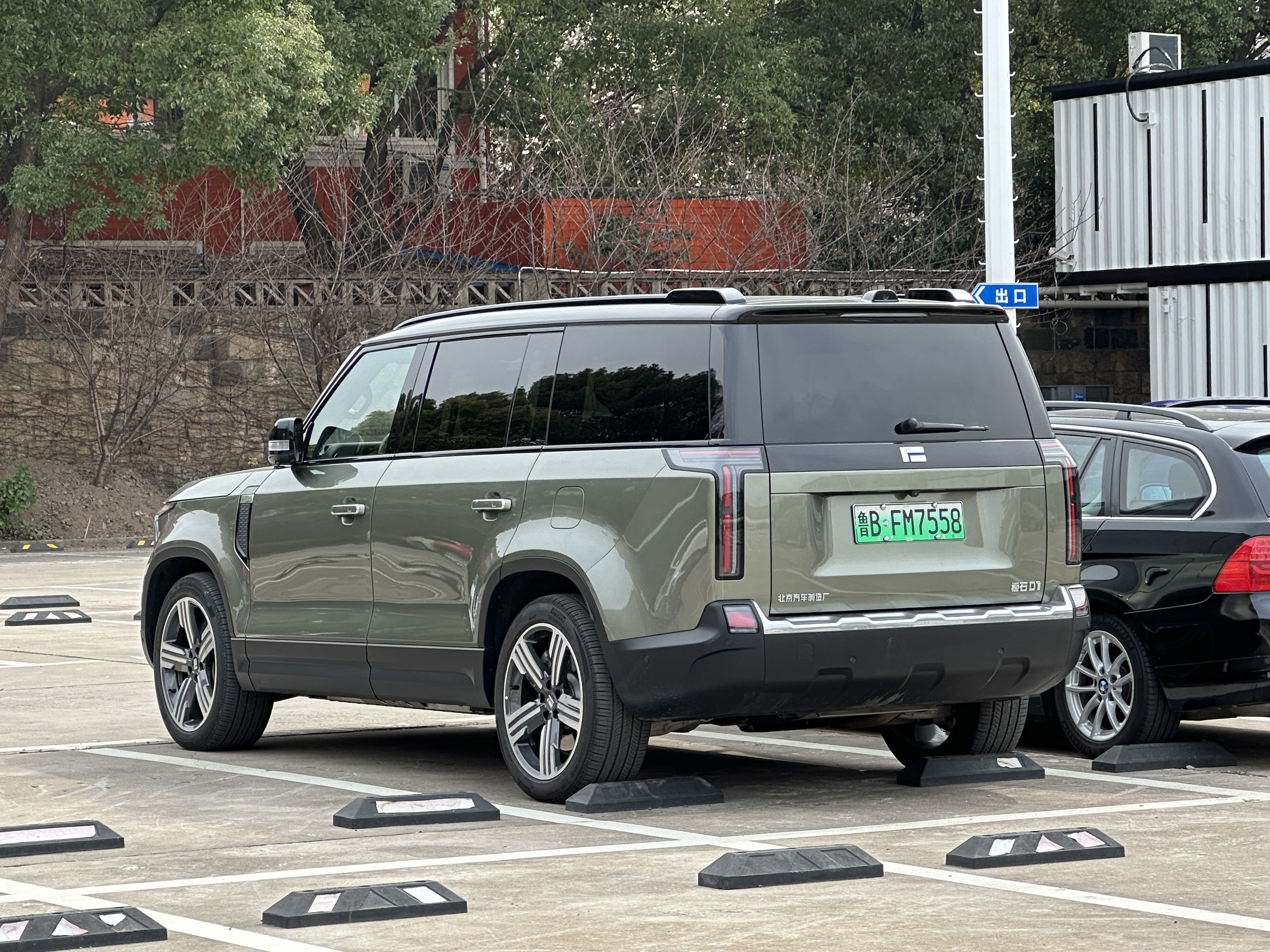
Rear view

The Chinese startup Rox Motor established in 2021 began work on its first car, the development of which entered an advanced stage in November 2022 through tests of pre-production, camouflaged units. The official presentation of the car called Rox 01 took place in August 2023. It took the form of a large, over 5-meter high-class SUV with a stylistic design by the Italian studio Pininfarina.

The car has characteristic, angular proportions, distinguished by the letter "T" motif in both the headlights and rear lamps. There is a spare wheel hidden under the cover on the trunk lid, while on the edge of the windshield there is LiDAR, which plays the main function in an advanced semi-autonomous driving system.

The passenger cabin has been adapted to transport either 6 passengers (2-2-2 layout) or 7 passengers (2-2-3 layout) in 3 rows of seats, while the dashboard has been kept in the typical aesthetics of modern Chinese cars, with light beige upholstery covering the cockpit, two points for inductive charging of phones and a central touch screen of the multimedia system. The additional equipment included the installation of a stove for use during, for example, picnics. Center console can be used as toilet with plastic bag.

=== Facelift (Adamas; 2025) ===
The facelifted version of the 01 is named the Adamas. It maintains the "square box" design language of the 01. The front grille surround now matches the body colour, and the honeycomb trim beneath the headlights has been upgraded to a sleek, enclosed design. Depending on the configuration, the Adamas is also slightly longer than the 01 in terms of length and is also shorter than the 01 in terms of height. The Adamas was introduced initially in the Middle East and launched in China in December 2025.

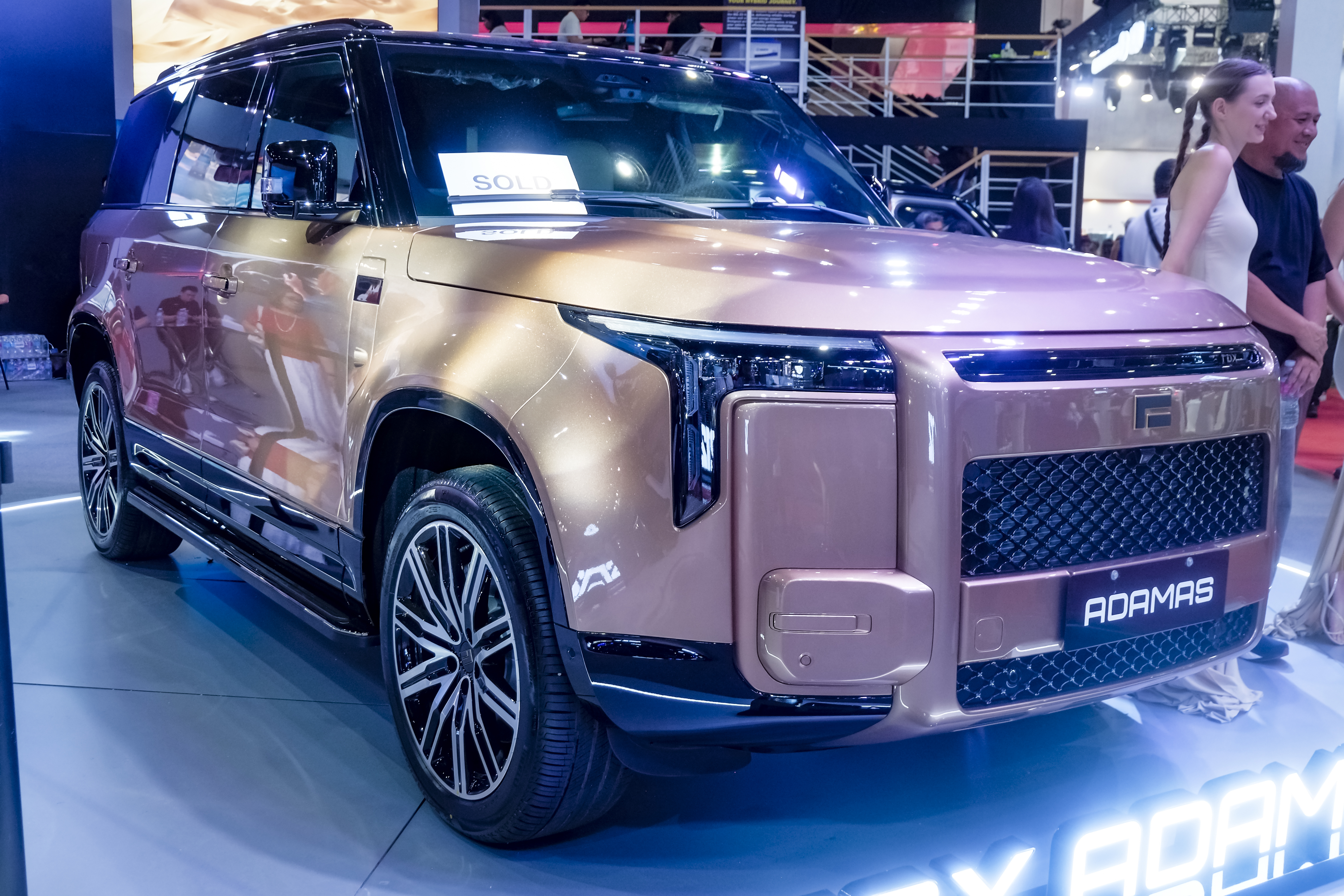
Rox Adamas

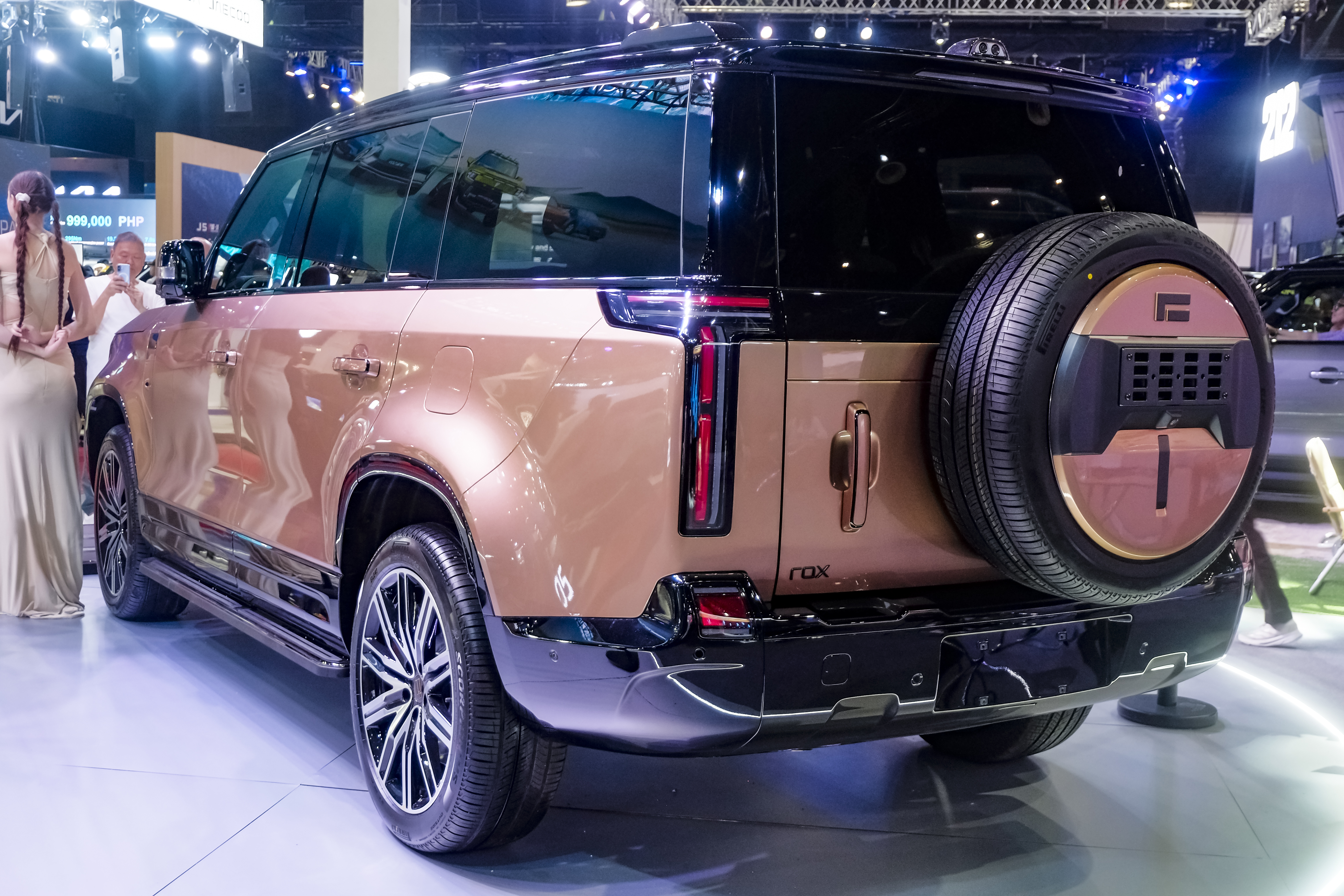
Rear view

== Specifications ==
The 01 is a car with a combustion-electric drive, in which the first unit serves as a generator and extends the car's range in a combined cycle. The batteries are powered by a 1.5-liter gasoline engine with a power of 154 HP, which is supplied by the domestic company Xinchen China Power, which also cooperates with, among others, with BMW and competitive Li Auto. Together with two additional electric motors, the 01 develops a total power of 470 hp and 740 Nm of maximum torque, reaching 100 km/h in 5.5 seconds. The 56 kWh battery supplied by CATL enables 235 kilometers of range in pure electric mode and 1,338 kilometers of combined range in combined gas-electric mode.

The Adamas, the 01's facelifted version, adds a rear-wheel-drive configuration. It uses the same front motor as the AWD version, however it is placed at the back instead of the front. It develops 201 horsepower instead of the 470 horsepower of the AWD version. A smaller, 44.5 kWh battery is also introduced with the Adamas, which gets a range of 215 kilometers instead of the 235 kilometers with the 56 kWh battery.

== Safety ==
C-NCAP (2021) test results 2024 Rox 01 All-Purpose 7-seater
Category		%
Overall:	5 /5 stars	86.2%
Occupant protection:		90.17%
Vulnerable road users:		66.69%
Active safety:		88.47%

== Sales ==
Rox Motor set a monthly sales record for the brand with 1,268 Rox 01s delivered in December 2024. Rox Motor delivered 1,236 Rox 01s worldwide in May 2025, marking the third consecutive month with deliveries exceeding 1,000 units.

Year	China	Worldwide
2023	912	
2024	4,827	
2025		15,318
