= Scout Traveler =

Full-size SUV

Overview
- Manufacturer: Scout Motors
- Production: 2027 (to commence)
- Assembly: United States: Blythewood, South Carolina

Body and chassis
- Class: Full-size SUV
- Body style: 5-door SUV
- Layout: Battery electric: Dual-motor, all-wheel-drive; Extended range EV: Transverse rear-engine, dual-motor, all-wheel-drive

Powertrain
- Engine: Gasoline EREV: Volkswagen Group naturally aspirated inline 4, unknown capacity
- Hybrid drivetrain: Series hybrid (Harvester models)
- Battery: Estimated 120-130 kWh NMC (EV); Estimated 60-70 kWh LFP (EREV)
- Range: 350 mi (563 km) (EV); 500 mi (805 km) (Harvester/EREV)

Dimensions
- Wheelbase: 3,058 mm (120.4 in)
- Length: With spare tire: 5,281 mm (207.9 in); Without spare tire: 4,849 mm (190.9 in)
- Width: Without mirrors: 2,029 mm (79.9 in); With mirrors: 2,327 mm (91.6 in)
- Height: 1,938 mm (76.3 in)

The Scout Traveler is an upcoming battery electric and range-extended full-size SUV to be produced by Scout Motors. It is the second of two models to be sold under the Scout brand, the other being the Terra pickup truck.

== Overview ==
In September 2021, reports of the Scout brand being potentially revived first appeared. Johan De Nysschen, then-CEO of Volkswagen Group of America, first floated the idea about an electric off-roader during a conversation with the media at a then-recent press event. Volkswagen gained control of the Scout trademark when Traton, the Volkswagen Group's commercial truck subsidiary, merged with Navistar in July 2021. The Scout brand's revival was confirmed on May 11, 2022, when Volkswagen approved plans to form a new independent company for the United States dedicated to designing, developing, manufacturing, and marketing electric vehicles in the country.

The Traveler was officially unveiled on October 24, 2024, alongside the Terra. It is a battery electric and range-extended full-size SUV that uses body-on-frame construction. The Terra and the Traveler were both designed by Scout's own R&D team in Novi, Michigan. It uses the North American Charging Standard and will be built at the company's factory in Blythewood, a town located in Greater Columbia, South Carolina.

== Public unveiling ==
The Traveler made its public debut at Williams-Brice Stadium during a South Carolina Gamecocks football game against the Missouri Tigers on November 18, 2024. The Terra also appeared alongside the Traveler, with the pre-production Terra painted blue and the pre-production Traveler painted clay red.

== Powertrain and chassis ==
The Traveler rides on a new body-on-frame platform created specifically for the Scout brand. Unlike other electric pickup SUVs, it uses a rear solid axle. Mechanical locking differentials at the front and rear come standard. The Terra will be able to tow over 7,000 pounds (3,175 kg). EV models use an 800-volt architecture and are expected to produce up to 1,000 lb-ft of torque. Electric models will go up to 350 miles (563 km) on a single charge, while range-extended models, which will use a hybrid powertrain that is marketed as the Harvester, will go up to 500 miles (805 km) (150 miles electric and 350 miles gasoline) before having to recharge and refuel. It will utilize all-wheel-drive as standard. The engine to be used in Harvester models is a naturally aspirated inline 4 of unknown capacity to be manufactured by Volkswagen in Silao, Mexico. Harvester models will have the engine mounted behind the rear axle.

The BEV is set to use a nickel-manganese-cobalt (NMC) battery pack, while the EREV will have a smaller lithium-iron-phosphate (LFP) pack . The actual battery sizes are yet to be confirmed, but it is expected that EV models will use a 120 to 130 kWh battery while EREV models will use a 60 to 70 kWh battery.
