= Slate Auto =

American EV startup company

- Type: Private
- Industry: Automotive
- Predecessor: Re:Build Manufacturing
- Founder: Miles Arnone; William Barker; Jeff Wilke
- Headquarters: Troy, Michigan, U.S.
- Area served: United States
- Key people: Peter Faricy (CEO)
- Products: Slate (vehicle)
- Parent: Re:Build Manufacturing
- Website: slate.auto

Slate Auto is an American startup company that is developing electric vehicles. It was founded in 2022 inside of Re:Build Manufacturing by Miles Arnone, William Barker and Jeff Wilke, and is based in Troy, Michigan. Its investors include Jeff Bezos, Mark Walter, and Re:Build Manufacturing. Its first product will be the Slate, an electric vehicle that can be configured as a pickup truck or an SUV.

== History ==
Slate was founded in 2022, and operated in stealth mode until it revealed the Slate vehicle on April 24, 2025. It was originally called "Re:Car", as a project within Re:Build Manufacturing, a domestic manufacturing platform. Slate's three co-founders and co-chairman Miles Arnone, William Barker and Jeff Wilke are all co-founders and leaders at Re:Build Manufacturing. Slate's first several hundred employees include many with experience at Ford, General Motors, Stellantis, and Harley-Davidson. The company is headquartered in Troy, Michigan, and has a design studio in Long Beach, California.

Slate raised at least $111 million in Series A financing, including an undisclosed amount from Bezos. Slate then raised $600 million in 2024 from Mark Walter, the controlling owner of the Los Angeles Dodgers and CEO of Guggenheim Partners, Jeff Bezos, and General Catalyst, a venture capital firm. In mid-2026, the company said it had completed a $650m series C investment round, which took its total capital raised to $1.4bn.

Initial manufacturing is expected to occur in Warsaw, Indiana, at a site previously operated by LSC Communications as a printing plant until its closure in 2023. Slate is retrofitting the plant to accommodate its vehicle line, targeting production to begin at the end of 2026. Slate claims that facility will have a capacity of up to 150,000 vehicles per year.

== Vehicles ==
Slate pickup truck at a demo in October 2026

The company's first vehicle, the Slate, is a battery electric vehicle that has been announced to come in two formats: a 2-seat compact pickup truck or a 5-seat SUV. Preorder opened for the vehicle on the morning of June 24, 2026. The Slate pickup truck is targeted to start at $24,950. Slate Auto CEO Peter Faricy claims the vehicle will be profitable and that the company is targeting positive cash flow next year. The vehicle's claimed estimated range is 205 miles (330 km).

== Re:Build Manufacturing ==
Slate Auto parent Re:Build Manufacturing is a U.S. company that held 13 industrial and engineering businesses as of August 2024. The company was founded in 2021 by Miles Arnone and Jeff Wilke. As of August 2024 the company had raised $600 million, funding partially used to acquire what the company calls its “member companies”, focusing on industries including defense, aerospace, health and clean tech. It also incubates new technologies and reportedly plans to spin out industrial businesses.

In addition to Slate Auto, the company owns Englewood, Colo.-based design and analysis aerospace engineering firm Answer Engineering, and Avon, Ohio-based metal fabrication and precision machining company CDI Cutting Dynamics. The company also partnered with US sodium-ion (Na-ion) battery startup Alsym Energy to develop commercial-scale battery cell manufacturing capacity in the US.
