= Scout Motors =

American electric vehicle manufacturer owned by Volkswagen

Scout Motors Inc.
- Type: Subsidiary
- Industry: Automotive
- Predecessor: International Harvester
- Founded: May 24, 2022; 4 years ago
- Headquarters: Charlotte, North Carolina, United States
- Area served: United States, Canada
- Key people: Scott Keogh (CEO)
- Products: Electric vehicles, range-extended electric vehicles
- Parent: Volkswagen Group
- Website: scoutmotors.com

Scout Motors Inc. is an American automaker and an independently run subsidiary of the Volkswagen Group. Volkswagen gained the rights to the Scout name, originally used on International Harvester's International Scout off-road vehicles, when it acquired truck maker Navistar in 2021, and it relaunched Scout as a brand in 2022. The company is developing two off-road vehicles, the Scout Traveler SUV and Scout Terra pickup, which will be offered as battery electric vehicles or with a gasoline range extender. They are to be built at a plant under construction in Blythewood, South Carolina, and the company is moving its headquarters to Charlotte, North Carolina.

== History ==
=== Background ===
International Harvester introduced the Scout in 1961, beginning with the Scout 80, and built the vehicle until 1980. The rights to the Scout name later passed to International Harvester's successor, Navistar. Volkswagen acquired them in 2021, when its truck-making subsidiary Traton completed its purchase of Navistar.

=== Relaunch ===
In September 2021, MotorTrend reported that Volkswagen was considering reviving the Scout name for a competitor to the Jeep Wrangler, Toyota 4Runner and the newly revived Ford Bronco. On May 11, 2022, Volkswagen approved plans for a new, independent company to design, build and sell off-road electric vehicles in the United States. Scout is run separately from Volkswagen, with its own executive team and board. Scott Keogh, president and CEO of Volkswagen Group of America, left that role to become Scout's first CEO on September 1, 2022.

=== Vehicle reveal ===
On October 24, 2024, Scout revealed the Traveler SUV and Terra pickup at an event outside Nashville, Tennessee. Alongside the battery electric versions, the company announced a "Harvester" option that adds a small gasoline engine to generate electricity and extend range. By January 2025 Scout had taken more than 50,000 reservations, about 70 percent of them for the Traveler, and Keogh said more than half of buyers had chosen the Harvester range extender. By November 2026 the number of reservations had increased to 212,000. Scout projected about 350 miles of range for the battery electric models and 500 miles for the Harvester versions, with a starting price below $60,000.

In November 2024 Scout said its vehicles would use the electrical architecture developed by Rivian and VW Group Technology, the Volkswagen Group–Rivian joint venture. In January 2025 the company made its first major trade show appearance at CES in Las Vegas.

== Dealership disputes ==
Scout plans to sell its vehicles directly to customers and service them itself, as Tesla, Rivian, Lucid and Polestar do, rather than through franchised dealers. Dealer groups objected that, as a wholly owned subsidiary of Volkswagen, Scout would be competing with Volkswagen's own franchised dealers in violation of state franchise laws. In February 2025 a group of Volkswagen and Audi dealers in Florida sued Scout, arguing that taking reservation deposits already amounted to sales under state law. The California New Car Dealers Association also sued Scout and Volkswagen Group of America in federal court. On March 30, 2026, a federal judge in the Southern District of California denied the companies' motions to dismiss the association's main claims, allowing the case to proceed.

== Facilities ==
=== Production Center ===
On March 3, 2023, Scout announced plans for a $2 billion factory in Blythewood, South Carolina, able to build 200,000 vehicles a year. The plant is expected to employ more than 4,000 people and will build the Traveler and Terra. By late 2025 the company was preparing for preproduction builds in South Carolina while prototypes underwent testing, including cold-weather testing in Sweden.

In May 2025 the South Carolina Department of Environmental Services fined Richland County $3 million over problems at the plant's construction site, with $2 million of the penalty suspended if the county met corrective deadlines. The county met all of the deadlines, and the penalty was held to $1 million, which it finished paying in 2026.

=== Innovation Center ===
Scout's research and development center in Novi, Michigan, houses its product, design and engineering teams.

=== Headquarters and offices ===
On November 12, 2025, Scout and North Carolina Governor Josh Stein announced that the company would put its headquarters in the Commonwealth development in Charlotte's Plaza Midwood neighborhood. Scout plans to invest $207 million and add 1,200 jobs there by the end of 2029, with state, county and city incentives tied to meeting those targets. Scout has also had offices in Fremont, California, and Tysons, Virginia, and many of their functions are expected to move to Charlotte.

== Models ==
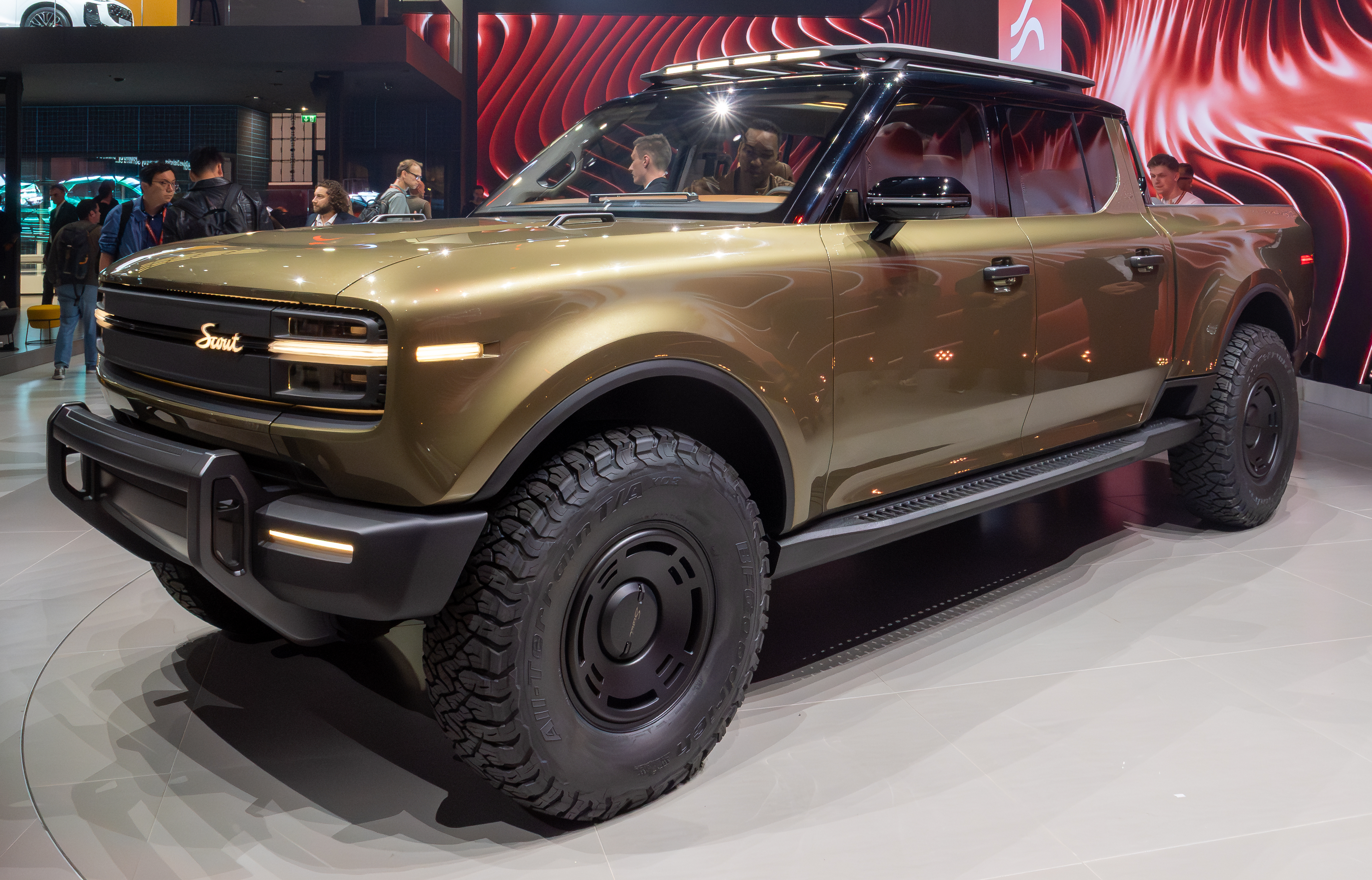
Scout Terra (pre-production model)

- Scout Terra, a full-size pickup truck
- Scout Traveler, a full-size SUV

Both were revealed in October 2024 and are planned for release in late 2027 as 2028 models. Reservations are open in the United States and Canada.
