= Extended-range electric vehicle =

Electric vehicle with an onboard engine-driven generator for extended range

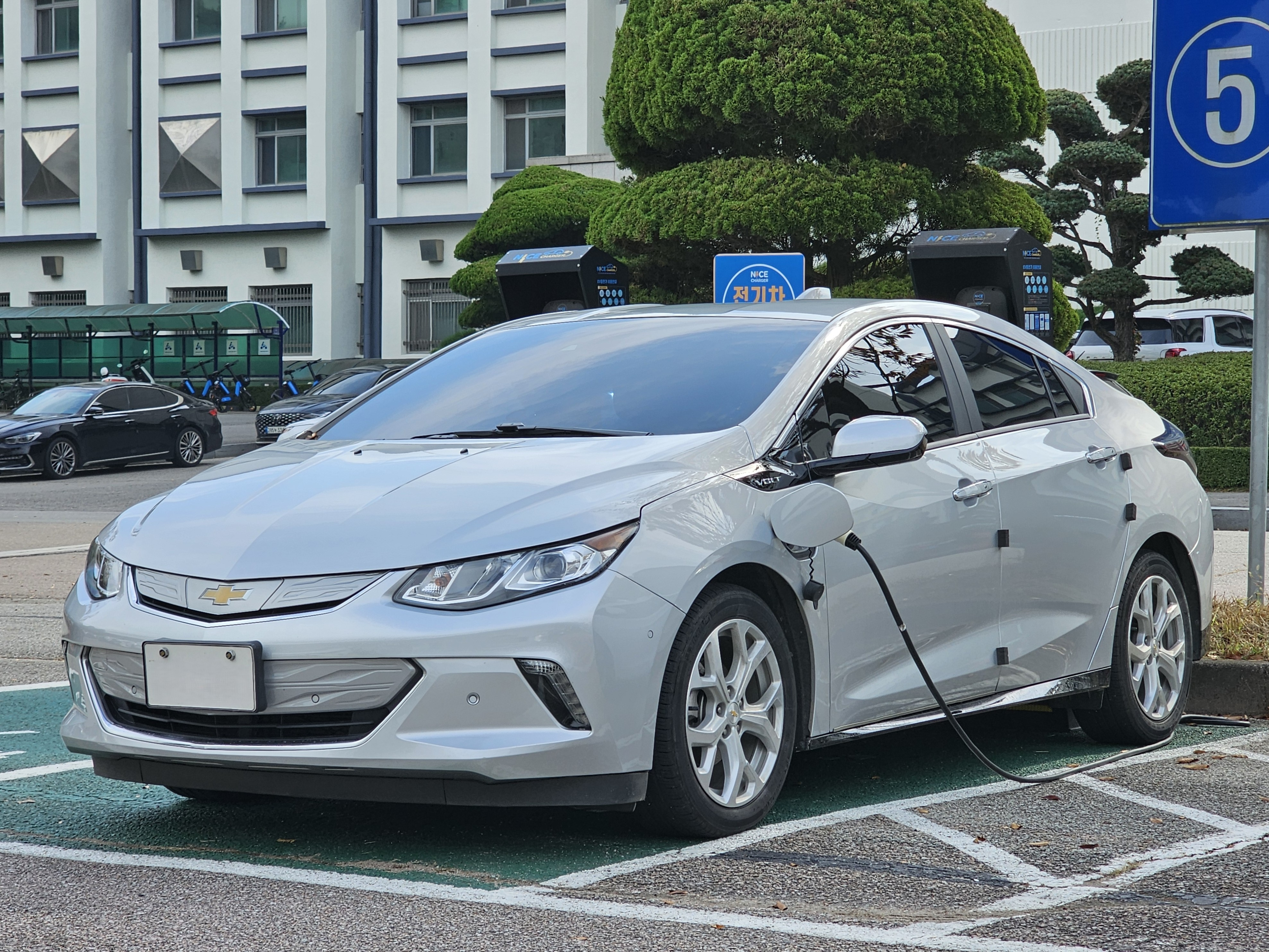
The Chevrolet Volt is considered the first modern extended-range electric vehicle.

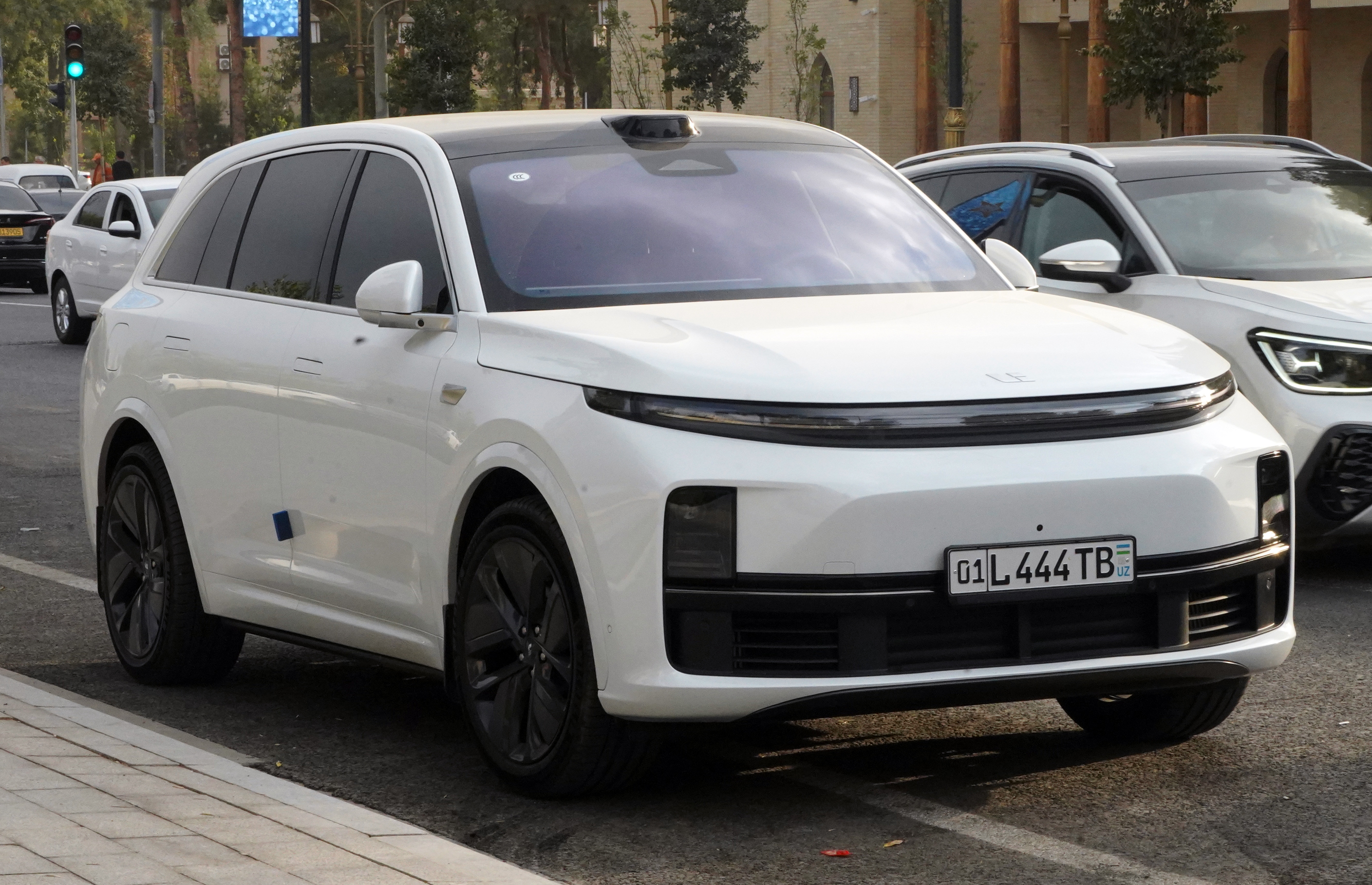
A Li L7 produced by Li Auto, the world's leader in the extended-range electric vehicle segment in terms of unit sales.

An extended-range electric vehicle (EREV), also called a range-extended electric vehicle (REEV), is an electric vehicle fitted with a fuel-powered internal combustion engine, acting as a range extender that drives a generator to recharge the traction battery when it is depleted. Unlike a conventional plug-in hybrid electric vehicle (PHEV), in which the combustion engine may drive the wheels directly, the engine in an extended-range electric vehicle usually has no mechanical connection to the drivetrain; the wheels are typically driven exclusively by the electric motor. Extended-range electric vehicles can usually be charged from the electrical grid as well as from the onboard generator, and are therefore classified as a subcategory of plug-in hybrid electric vehicles by most regulators, though some markets, notably China, treat them as a distinct segment.

In the U.S., the California Air Resources Board (CARB) uses the designation BEVx for vehicles that comply with its specific criteria for extended-range battery-electric vehicles.

Outside China, the EREV architecture has found limited commercial traction; early examples including the Chevrolet Volt and BMW i3 REx were both discontinued by the early 2020s. In China, the segment achieved mass-market scale from around 2019, led by Li Auto, AITO (Seres Auto), and Leapmotor, with EREV sales reaching 1.18 million units in 2024 alone. From 2024, renewed interest emerged in Western markets as consumer resistance to battery electric vehicles led manufacturers to reconsider range-extension as a bridge technology, with Stellantis, Scout Motors, Hyundai, and Ford all announcing EREV models for introduction between 2026 and 2029.

== Distinction from plug-in hybrid electric vehicles ==
The key structural difference between an EREV and a conventional PHEV lies in the relationship between the combustion engine and the drivetrain. In most PHEVs, the engine can propel the vehicle directly, either alone or in combination with the electric motor; the battery supplements or replaces the engine's output. In an extended-range electric vehicle, this relationship is reversed: the battery and motor form the sole propulsion system, and the engine exists only to generate electricity when the battery charge falls below a threshold. This series-only architecture means the combustion engine can be sized to the vehicle's average power requirement rather than its peak demand, and can operate at or near its most efficient rotational speed, independent of vehicle speed or load.

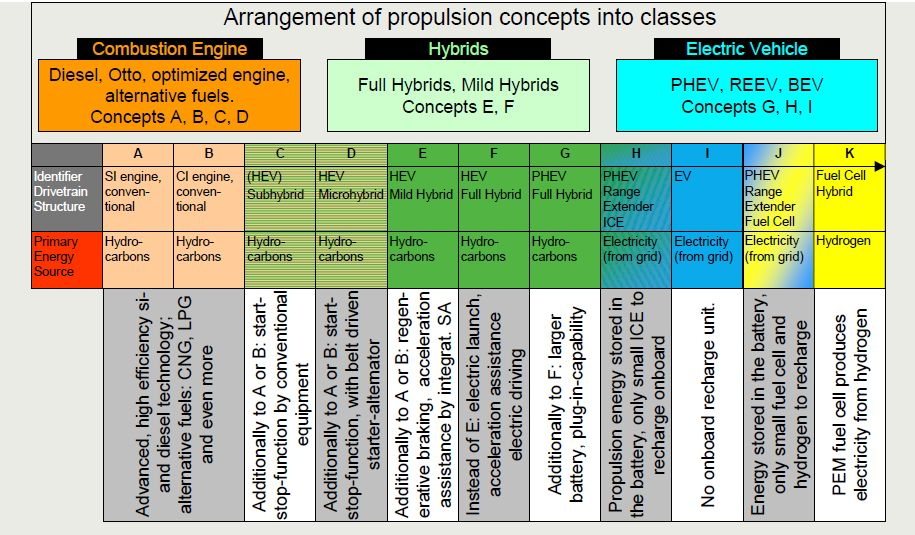
Schematic classification of alternative powertrains

In practice, the boundary between PHEV and EREV designs has become less distinct as battery capacities have grown. Some vehicles marketed as PHEVs use primarily series-hybrid operation in everyday driving, while some EREVs allow limited direct engine contribution under specific high-load conditions. Chinese regulations classify vehicles by their electric range and charging capability rather than by drivetrain topology, meaning vehicles using series-hybrid architecture with large batteries may be registered either as PHEVs or as EREVs depending on context.

The series-hybrid drivetrain topology alone does not define an EREV. External charging capability is not required for EREV. Some countries may require external charging capability to be legally classified as EREV, but this is purely a legal or classification requirement, not an engineering requirement. External charging capability is required for PHEV. Nissan's e-Power system uses an identical series architecture, with a petrol engine acting solely as a generator, and the wheels driven exclusively by an electric motor. It does not carry any plug-in charging capability and cannot be charged from the electrical grid. The battery is replenished only by the onboard engine and by regenerative braking. As a result, e-Power vehicles, including the X-Trail e-Power, Qashqai e-Power and Kicks e-Power, are classified as conventional hybrid electric vehicles rather than EREVs or PHEVs, and do not qualify for plug-in incentives or green licence plate schemes in China or equivalent programmes elsewhere.

=== Regulations and legal classification ===
A persistent challenge for regulators is that the boundary between a plug-in hybrid electric vehicle and an extended-range electric vehicle is defined by drivetrain topology, whether the combustion engine drives the wheels directly, rather than by any measurement taken during a standardised test. Most regulatory frameworks therefore do not create a distinct legal category for extended-range electric vehicles, instead classifying them within the broader plug-in hybrid electric vehicle (PHEV) category for the purposes of emissions, taxation, and incentives. The classification differ substantially by jurisdiction.

==== North America ====
The California Air Resources Board (CARB) created the BEVx designation in 2012 as the only major regulatory framework to formally distinguish extended-range electric vehicles from conventional PHEVs, treating them instead as a subcategory of battery electric vehicle. Under the 2012 amendments to the Zero Emission Vehicle Regulations, a vehicle qualifies as BEVx if:

- its rated all-electric range is at least 120 km (75 miles), exceeding the 50 mi (80 kilometres) threshold for a zero-emission vehicle;
- the Auxiliary Power Unit (APU) provides additional range not greater than the battery range;
- the APU cannot engage until the battery charge has been depleted;
- the vehicle meets super ultra low emission vehicle (SULEV) requirements; and
- the APU and all associated fuel systems comply with zero evaporative emission requirements.

The 2014 BMW i3 with the optional range extender unit was the first vehicle to receive BEVx certification. The BEVx designation is significant because it awards compliance credits under California's ZEV mandate closer to those of a pure battery electric vehicle than those of a PHEV, reflecting the series-only architecture and high electric range.

At the federal level in the United States, the Environmental Protection Agency classifies extended-range electric vehicles as PHEVs for fuel economy labelling and emissions reporting purposes, with no separate regulatory category.

==== European Union ====
The EU does not officially recognise extended-range electric vehicles as a distinct regulatory category. Under the Worldwide Harmonised Light Vehicles Test Procedure (WLTP) framework established by Regulation (EU) 2017/1151 and its subsequent amendments, vehicles with a combustion engine and a rechargeable battery that can be charged from the grid are tested and certified as PHEVs (designated "off-vehicle charging hybrid electric vehicles", OVC-HEV), regardless of whether the engine drives the wheels directly or solely acts as a generator.

For CO_{2} compliance under Regulation (EU) 2019/631, both PHEVs and extended-range electric vehicles are assessed using a utility factor, a weighting that reflects the statistical share of distance driven on electricity by the average driver. Following evidence that official PHEV CO_{2} values were substantially lower than real-world emissions, Regulation (EU) 2023/443 revised the utility factors applied at type approval from September 2023, with further revisions planned in 2025 and 2027 based on on-board fuel consumption monitoring data. As of 2025, the Euro 7 emissions framework (Regulation (EU) 2024/1257), which takes effect in 2026, also does not create a distinct classification for range extender architectures.

The European Parliament Research Service defines the EREV as a vehicle in which "the auxiliary combustion engine is used only to supplement battery charging," distinguishing it definitionally from a PHEV, but this distinction has not been carried into binding type-approval legislation. As of 2025, only two EREV models were on sale in Europe, which are the Mazda MX-30 R-EV and the Leapmotor C10 REEV Ultra Hybrid.

==== China ====
===== National classification =====
China's regulatory framework classifies vehicles by drivetrain function and electric range rather than by whether the engine mechanically drives the wheels. At the national level, extended-range electric vehicles are placed within the plug-in hybrid electric vehicle (PHEV) category under the umbrella of new energy vehicles (NEVs), alongside battery electric vehicles and fuel cell vehicles. The State Council's 2012 Development Plan for Energy-saving and New Energy Automotive Industry established the framework that continues to govern the sector, treating PHEVs (explicitly including EREVs) as a co-equal technical route alongside BEVs.

Under the national dual-credit system administered by the Ministry of Industry and Information Technology (MIIT), manufacturers earn NEV credits for both PHEVs and EREVs, with the credit value reflecting the vehicle's all-electric range. The system does not award different credit values based on whether the architecture is series-only or parallel. From 2026, qualifying PHEVs and EREVs must have a minimum electric-only range of 100 km (62 mi) (raised from 43 km (27 mi)) to retain eligibility for vehicle purchase tax exemption, a threshold that most Chinese EREVs, with their large batteries, comfortably exceed but that excludes many shorter-range PHEVs. Industry analysts estimated that approximately 40% of plug-in hybrid models on sale in 2025 fell below this threshold, while EREVs and premium PHEVs were unaffected.

The energy consumption standard GB 36980.1-2025, effective 1 January 2026, sets mandatory consumption limits for plug-in vehicles including EREVs, requiring a certain fuel consumption limits. GB 36980.1-2025 applies to all fully electric and hybrid vehicles, including vehicles with a kerb weight more than 3,500 kg (7,700 lb), with the following specifications:

- Electric range must be equal or more than 100 km (60 miles)
- Fuel consumption in battery retention mode should be lower than 70% (kerb weight less than or equal to 2,510 kg, 5,530 lb) or 75% (kerb weight more than 2510 kg) of the limit set in GB 19578-2024
- Power consumption in power consumption mode should be lower than 140% or 145% of the limit in GB 36980.1-2025
- Kerb weight less than or equal to 1,090 kg (2,400 lb): power consumption limit is 10.1 kWh/100 km (0.163 kWh/mi)
- Kerb weight more than 1,090 kg (2,400 lb) and less than or equal to 2,710 kg (5,970 lb): power consumption = 0.00556 × (kerb weight - 1780) + 13.92kWh/100km
- Kerb weight more than 2,710 kg (5,970 lb): power consumption limit is 19.1 kWh/100 km (0.31 kWh/mi)

===== Green licence plates and city-level restrictions =====
At the municipal level, the treatment of PHEVs and EREVs has diverged significantly from the national framework. China introduced green vehicle registration plates for NEVs from 2016, with the designation conferring benefits including exemption from vehicle lottery systems and, in some cities, access to bus lanes and free parking. PHEVs, explicitly including EREVs, were initially eligible for green plates nationwide.

Cities have since tightened eligibility independently. Shanghai, where the green plate exempted buyers from the city's competitive licence plate auction (a saving worth several hundred thousand yuan), stopped issuing free plates to PHEVs and EREVs from 1 January 2023, restricting the benefit to BEVs and fuel cell vehicles only. Beijing applies a stricter classification: PHEVs (including EREVs) qualify for green plates but in a lower sub-series, and do not receive right-of-way privileges on restricted roads, which remain exclusive to BEVs and FCEVs. Other cities maintain the broader eligibility that includes PHEVs and EREVs.

== History ==
=== Early concepts and prototypes ===
The concept of using a small engine to extend the range of an electrically propelled vehicle predates the modern era of battery electric vehicles. Experimental range extender configurations appeared in research and competition contexts from the 1990s, including external generator trailers attached to purpose-built electric vehicles such as the AC Propulsion tzero.

=== 2010s ===
==== Chevrolet Volt (2011) ====
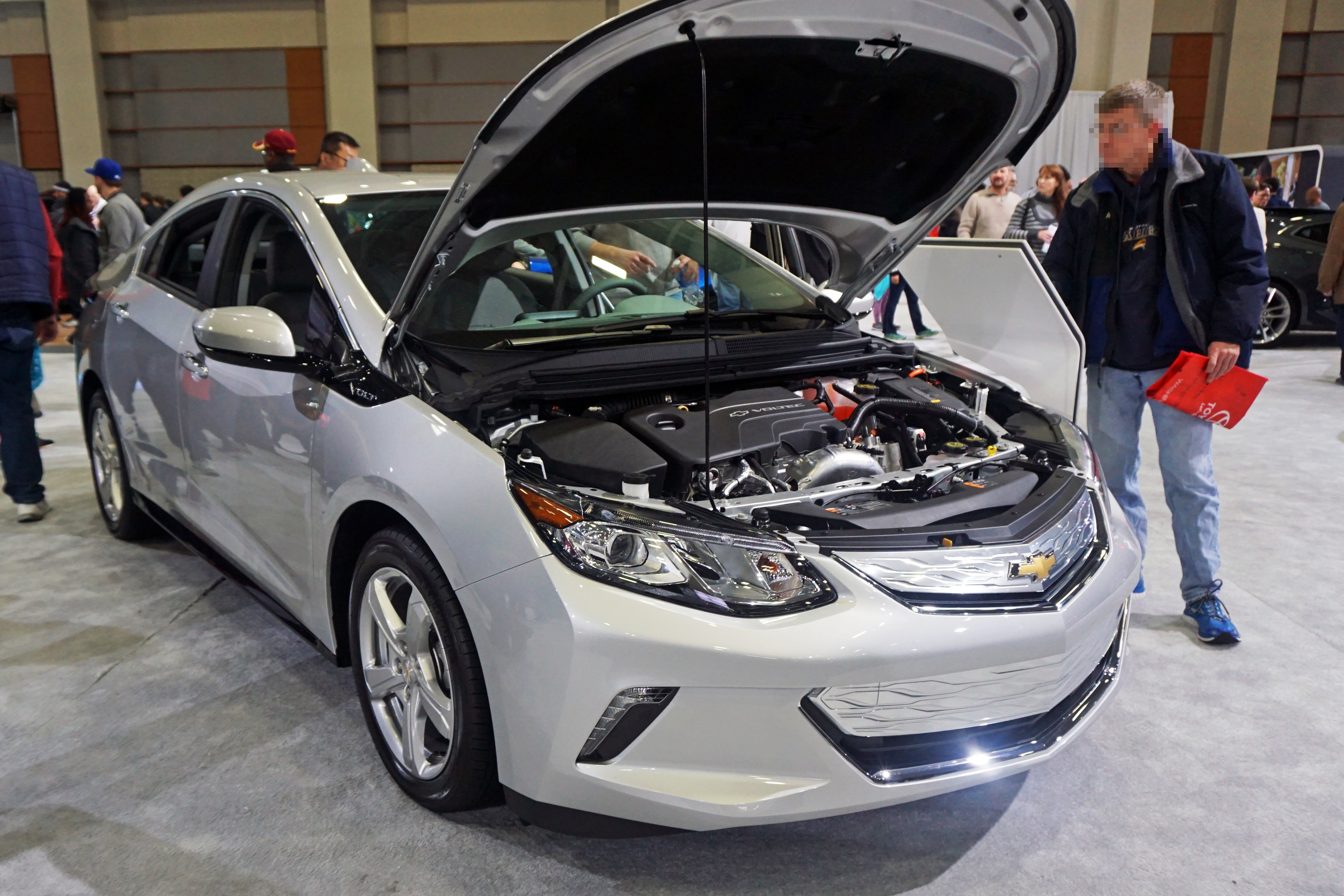
Second-generation Chevrolet Volt

The first mass-produced extended-range electric vehicle to reach a major market was the Chevrolet Volt, launched in 2011. General Motors described it as "an electric car with extended range," using the abbreviation E-REV. The Volt operated in charge-depleting all-electric mode for the first 40 to 80 km (25 to 50 mi), after which a 1.4-litre four-cylinder engine engaged as a generator to sustain battery charge at a minimum threshold. The second-generation Volt offered an all-electric range of approximately 85 km (53 mi) before the 1.5-litre engine engaged as a generator. Volt owners who charged regularly typically drove more than 1,560 km (970 mi) between fuel fill-ups.

GM ended Volt production in February 2019, citing declining annual sales that had fallen below 21,000 units, losses on each vehicle sold, a broader company retreat from passenger sedans as consumer preference shifted toward SUVs and crossovers, the expiry of the federal tax credit that had supported purchases, and a strategic decision to redirect investment toward battery electric vehicles and autonomous vehicle development. Former GM vice chairman Bob Lutz described the Volt as "a financial loser that did what was intended," characterising it as a bridging product between the earlier GM EV1 programme and GM's subsequent all-electric lineup.

==== BMW i3 with range extender (2014) ====
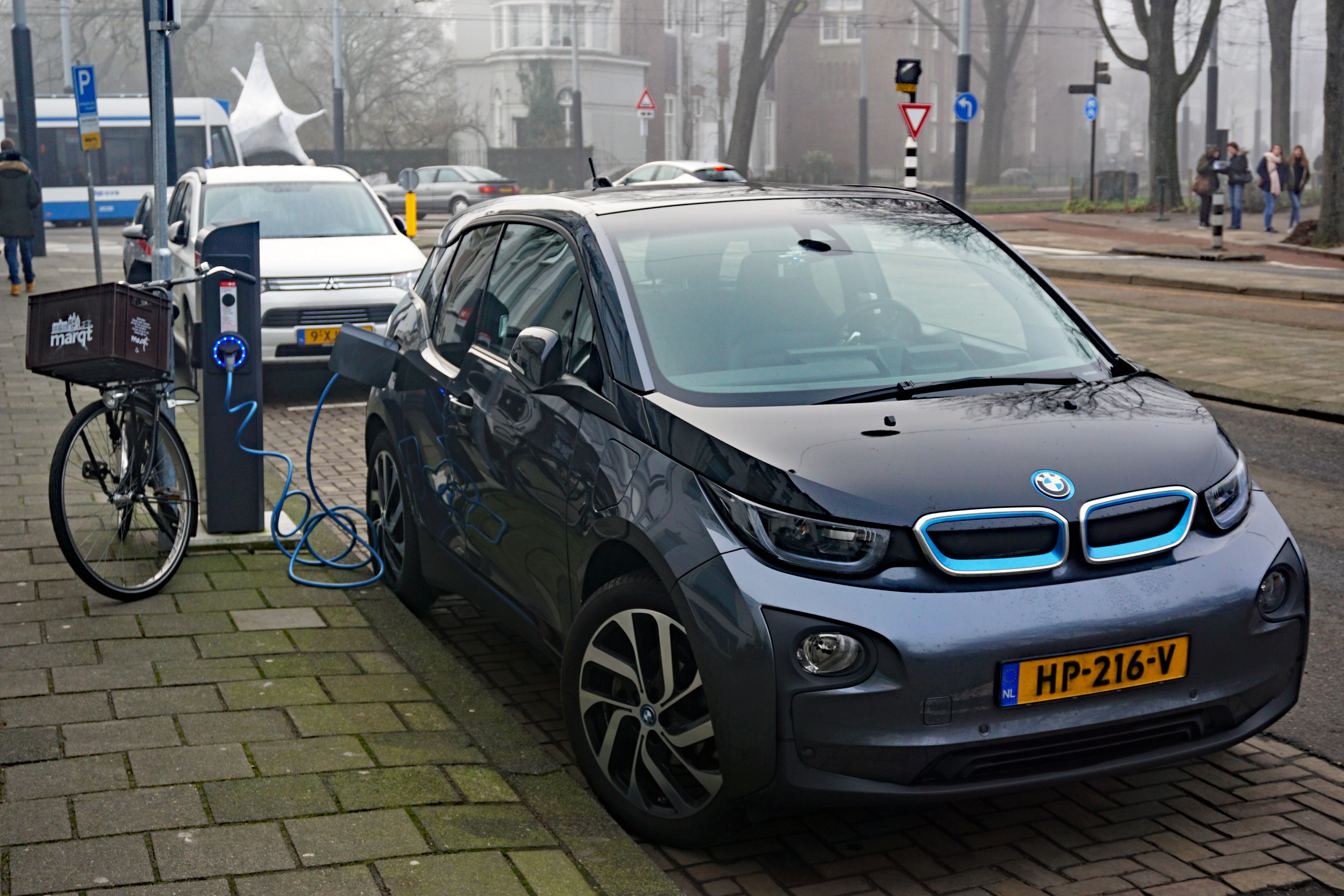
BMW i3 REx

BMW offered an optional range extender variant of the BMW i3 battery electric car. The APU used a 647 cc two-cylinder petrol engine — the same unit fitted in the BMW C650 GT scooter — paired with a 9 L (2.0 imp gal; 2.4 US gal) fuel tank (electronically limited to 7 L in the United States). The range extender engaged when the battery fell to 6%, extending total range from approximately 130 to 160 km (80 to 100 mi) to 240 to 300 km (150 to 190 mi). BMW designed the system strictly as a backup for reaching a charging location, not for regular use; by 2016, the range extender option was being regularly used in fewer than 5% of i3s. The i3 REx was the first vehicle to qualify under CARB's BEVx classification. The option costed an additional US$3,850 in the United States.

The range-extender option was discontinued in Europe in October 2018 following the introduction of a larger 42.2 kWh battery pack for the pure-electric i3, which extended its WLTP-rated range to approximately 193 mi (311 km), sufficient to make the petrol backup redundant for most European use cases. BMW stated that the REx share of i3 sales in Europe had fallen from around 50% in 2015 to 25% by 2018 as battery range improved, and that it would "only sell the pure-electric version going forward." The option remained available in the United States and Japan for a further period, before the entire i3 line ended production in July 2022. Jan Freimann, BMW's manager for connected e-mobility, stated in 2019 that range-extender technology had "no future" within BMW's strategy, citing the expansion of DC fast-charging networks and continuing improvements in battery energy density as having removed the conditions that originally made the backup generator concept necessary.

==== Others ====
The LEVC TX London taxi was launched as an extended-range electric vehicle in 2017. It combines a 33 kWh battery with a 1.5-litre petrol engine as a range extender, giving it a combined range sufficient for extended urban taxi operation without requiring frequent charging stops.

Other extended-range electric vehicles include the discontinued Cadillac ELR (2013–2016), which shares most of its powertrain with the Chevrolet Volt, and the discontinued Fisker Karma (2011–2012).

=== 2020s ===
==== Chinese market expansion ====
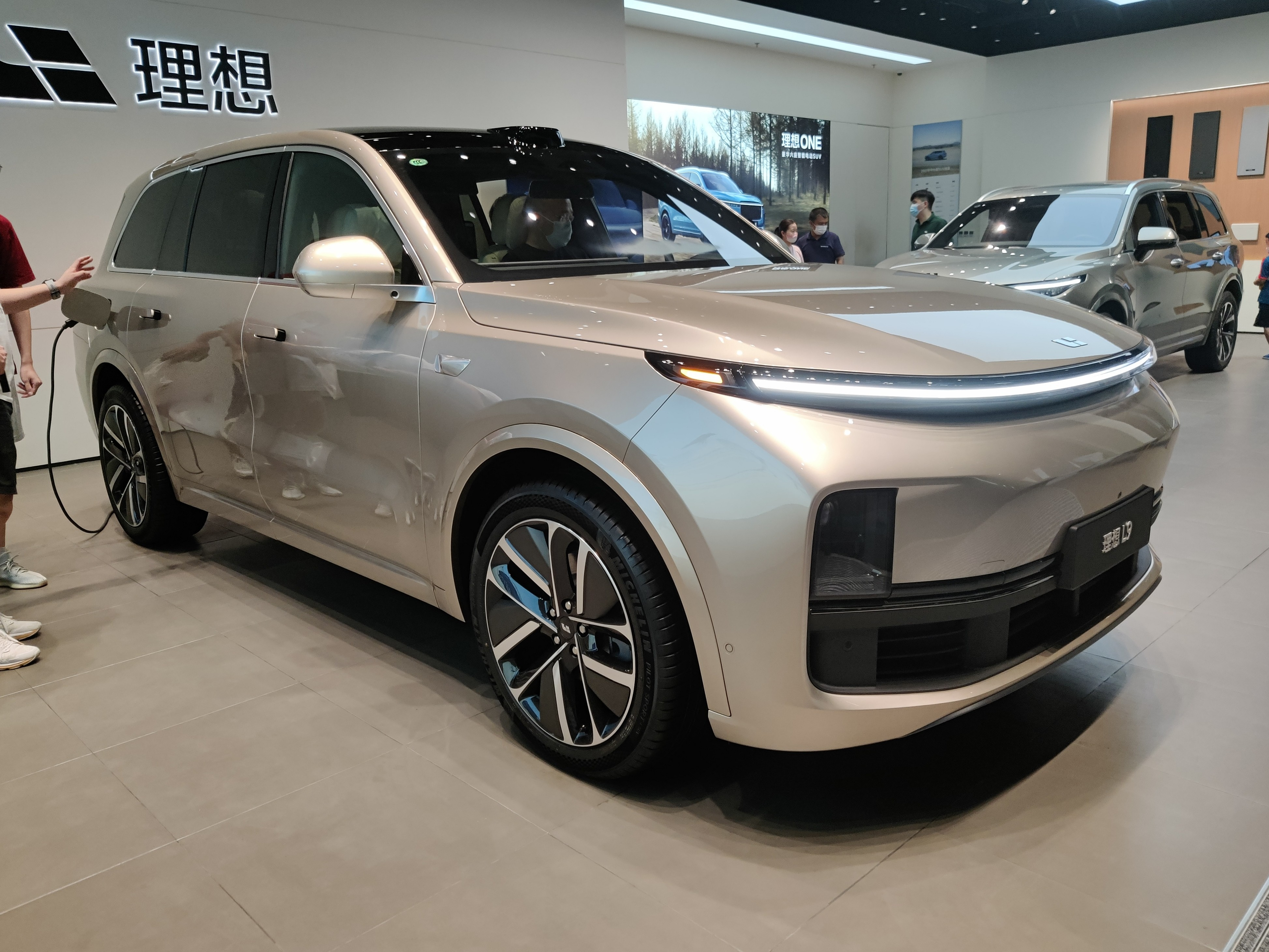
A Li L9 being charged in a showroom. Li Auto has produced nearly 1.5 million EREVs as of December 2025.

The EREV segment grew from a niche into a mainstream vehicle category in China from 2019 onwards. Li Auto's Li One, launched in 2019, established the commercial model: a large battery providing substantial all-electric range for city driving, supplemented by a small engine acting solely as a generator for longer trips. Unlike the BMW i3's emergency-backup approach, Li Auto designed the engine as a routine supplement, with a battery large enough that most daily urban driving occurred entirely on stored charge.

The expansion of the EREV segment attracted most major Chinese manufacturers. After Li Auto demonstrated the format's commercial viability, brands including AITO (Seres Auto), Leapmotor, Deepal, Avatr, and XPeng launched or announced EREV models. CATL developed its Freevoy Super Hybrid Battery specifically targeting the EREV and PHEV segments, capable of providing an all-electric range of approximately 400 km on a single charge, a figure that reduces the practical need for the generator to engage on typical weekly use.

Foreign manufacturers started to produce EREVs by utilising technologies from its domestic joint venture partners. The Mazda EZ-6 and Mazda EZ-60, introduced in 2024 and 2025 respectively, are produced with Changan technology and offered with EREV powertrain option alongside the battery electric versions. 2026 introductions such as the Nissan NX8 and Volkswagen ID. Era 9X were developed locally, and also adopted EREV powertrain.

From mid-2025, EREV sales in China declined year-on-year for several consecutive months, as improvements in battery electric vehicles, including newly launched models averaging over 500 km of CLTC-rated range, some exceeding 600–700 km, narrowed the practical range advantage EREVs had held. The simultaneous expansion of China's charging network to 12.82 million charging units by the end of 2024, a 49.1% year-on-year increase, further reduced range anxiety among potential BEV buyers.

The SUV segment accounted for eight of the ten best-selling EREV models in 2025. Over 60% of 2024 EREV sales in China came from vehicles priced above RMB 250,000 (approximately USD 34,000), reflecting the technology's concentration in large, premium models marketed on total range and technology content. Li Auto's L-series of SUVs, the L6, L7, L8, and L9, the successors of the Li Auto One, has accumulated over one million cumulative sales by 2025.

==== Renewed interest outside China ====
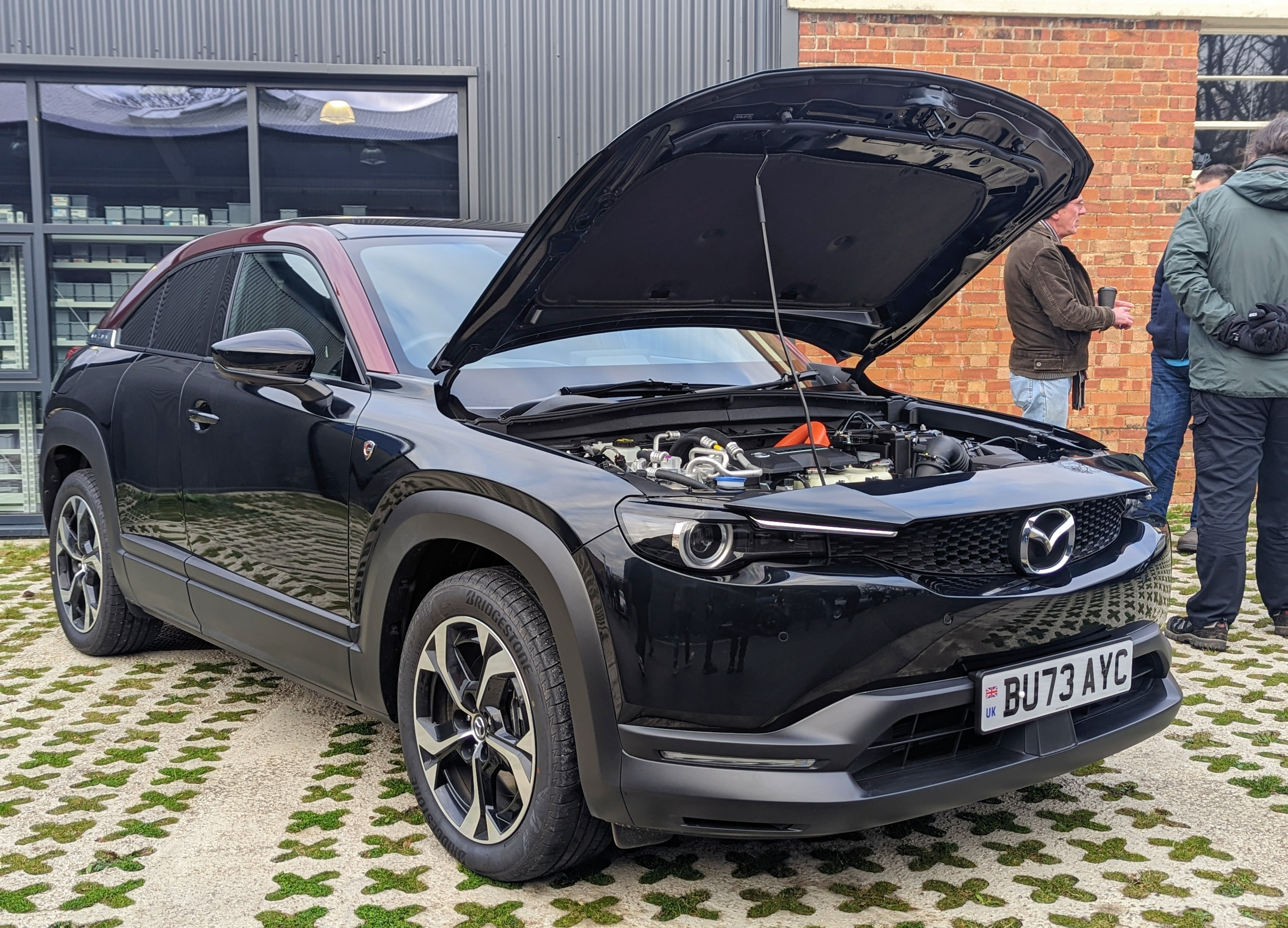
Mazda MX-30 R-EV

By the early 2020s, the segment outside China had been reduced to a handful of niche products, most notably the Mazda MX-30 R-EV. It uses a compact rotary engine of 830 cc as its range extender, making it the first rotary engined model from Mazda after the demise of the RX-8. The engine was chosen for its compact dimensions relative to power output. It is paired with a 17.8 kWh battery and an 85 km (53 mi) all-electric range, for a combined range of approximately 630 km (390 mi). It was available only in California and select European markets before being withdrawn completely in 2026.

Renewed interest emerged in Western markets from 2024 as consumer resistance to battery electric vehicles, particularly among buyers of trucks and large SUVs concerned about towing range and charging infrastructure, led manufacturers to reconsider range-extension as a practical bridge technology.

In 2023, Stellantis announced the Ram 1500 Ramcharger, later renamed to Ram 1500 REV, which brought the range extender format to the North American full-size pickup truck segment. It pairs a 92 kWh battery that provides up to 145 mi (233 km) of all-electric range, with a 3.6-litre V6 petrol engine acting solely as a generator, giving a total range of approximately 690 mi (1,110 km). The vehicle supports DC fast charging at up to 175 kW.

In 2024, Volkswagen Group through its American Scout Motors brand introduced the Terra full-size pickup truck and the Traveler full-size SUV. In addition to a battery electric version, it will be available as an EREV, which will utilise a Volkswagen-made four-cylinder petrol engine marketed as Harvester, offering 500 miles (805 km) of combined range. The models would be built on a new body-on-frame platform with rear solid axle and mechanical locking differentials at the front and rear. It will be built at the company's factory in Blythewood, a town located in Greater Columbia, South Carolina. Scout Motors has seen approximately 85% of its pre-order reservations for the extended-range variants of both models rather than the battery-only versions.

Ford, Kia, and Hyundai (including Genesis) announced its own EREV development programmes targeting 2026–2027 production. Several Chinese manufacturers, including Li Auto, Leapmotor, and AITO, announced plans to export EREV models to Europe and Southeast Asia from around 2026.

== Design characteristics ==
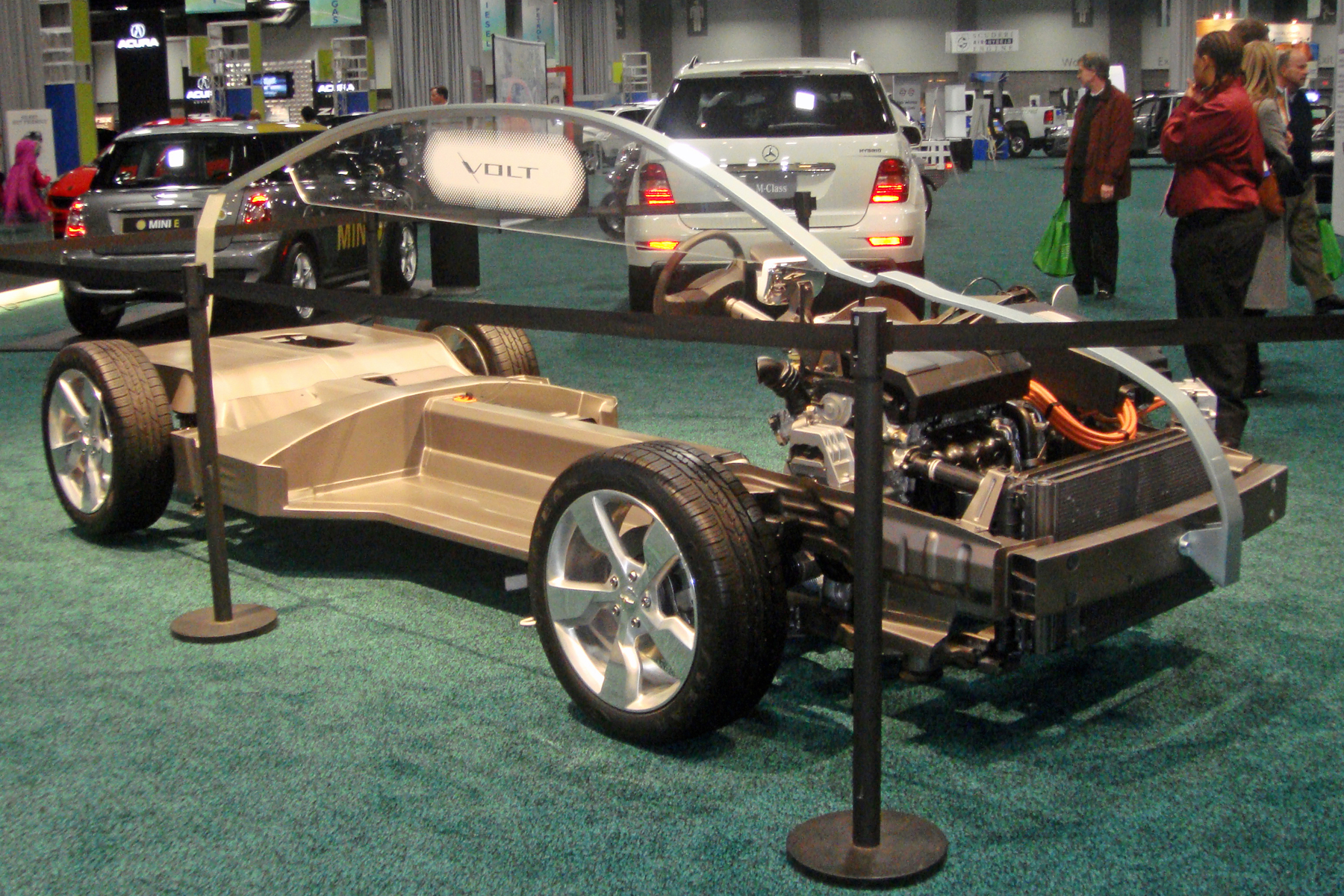
Chevrolet Volt drivetrain cutaway

=== Battery and electric range ===
Chinese market EREVs of the mid-2020s typically used battery packs of 30–50 kWh, providing 150–200 km (93–124 mi) of all-electric range on the CLTC test cycle before the generator engages. The average Chinese market EREV operated in electric-only mode for more than 70% of driven distance. Battery capacity in the segment increased substantially from around 2023 to 2024, with several premium models exceeding 43 kWh, some long-range variants reaching 100 kWh.

=== Engine sizing ===
Because the combustion engine in an extended-range electric vehicle does not need to meet peak power demand, since that role falls to the battery and motor, the engine can be significantly smaller than an engine in a conventional vehicle of equivalent performance. Most Chinese market EREVs use engines of 1.0–1.5 litres displacement; Mazda used a compact Wankel engine in the MX-30 R-EV. The engine can run at or near its most thermally efficient operating point regardless of vehicle speed, reducing fuel consumption during range-extension operation. This also reduces engine wear compared to a conventional drivetrain subjected to varying loads, and eliminates the need for a multi-ratio gearbox connected to the engine.

=== Charging ===
Most Chinese market EREVs support DC fast charging with figures comparable to BEVs. The Ram 1500 REV will support up to 175 kW DC fast charging, adding approximately 50 mi (80 km) of range in ten minutes.

== Environmental considerations ==
The environmental benefit of an extended-range electric vehicle depends substantially on how it is driven and on the carbon intensity of the electricity grid where it charges. A 2022 analysis of approximately 100,000 PHEVs and EREVs in China, Europe, and North America by the International Council on Clean Transportation found that real-world fuel consumption and tailpipe CO_{2} emissions were on average two to four times higher than type-approval values, with the gap driven by owners who did not regularly plug in and therefore relied predominantly on the petrol engine.

A 2024 study of China's top-selling EREV models found that actual electricity intensity was 30–40% higher than NEDC test-cycle values, while actual petrol intensity was 3–6 times greater than test values, reflecting real-world driving conditions and variable charging behaviour across regions. A 2023 lifecycle assessment using China's Tsinghua-LCA model found that PHEVs and EREVs emit 41.6–49.1% more greenhouse gases during vehicle manufacturing than conventional vehicles, primarily due to battery production accounting for nearly 30% of the vehicle-cycle total, but that these surplus manufacturing emissions are offset by lower fuel-cycle emissions during operation, with effective emission reductions of 14–53% compared to conventional vehicles depending on vehicle class and regional electricity grid.

== Market and sales ==
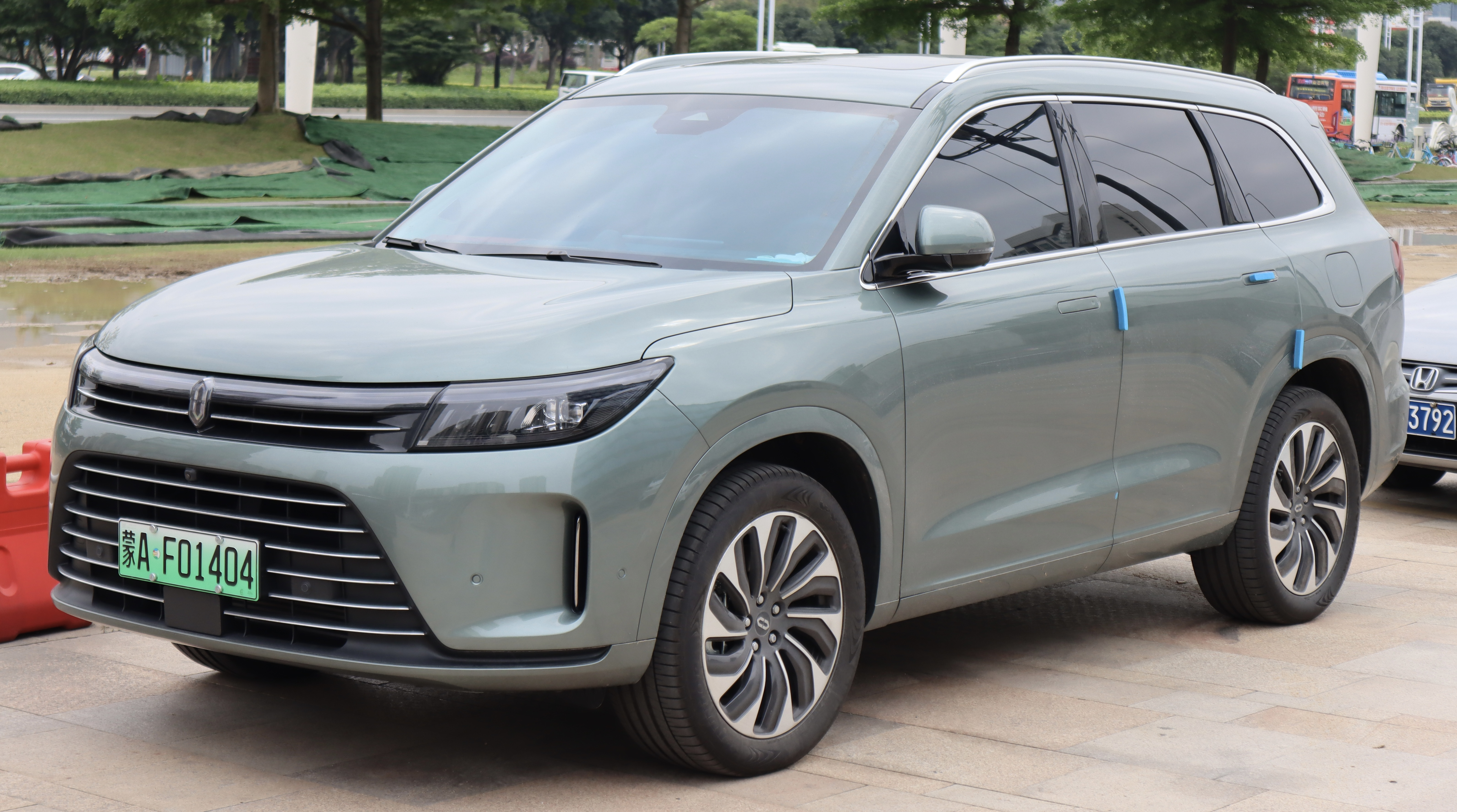
The AITO M7, produced by Seres Auto from China, is the world's all-time best-selling extended-range electric vehicle nameplate with over 390,000 cumulative deliveries by December 2025.

The global EREV market is dominated by China, which accounted for the overwhelming majority of sales through the mid-2020s. Global EREV sales reached 1.2 million units in 2024, projected to grow to 3.2 million units by 2030 at a compound annual growth rate of 17.1%. Outside China, the only EREV models on sale in major Western markets as of early 2025 were the Mazda MX-30 R-EV and the Leapmotor C10 REEV in Europe, and the Ram 1500 REV in North America.

=== China ===
Li Auto maintained leadership of the Chinese EREV market throughout 2024 and 2025, with cumulative deliveries across all models surpassing 1.4 million units by September 2025. The company edged past its delivery target of 500,000 vehicles for the business year ended December 2024. Leapmotor surpassed 536,000 cumulative deliveries by November 2025, a 113.4% year-on-year growth, and set a 2026 target of one million units, with EREV variants available across most of its model range. The AITO brand operated by Seres Group in partnership with Huawei delivered 350,000 units in 2024 across its M5, M7, and M9 models, with the M9 alone recording over 150,000 deliveries in its first full year on sale.

SUVs accounted for eight of the ten best-selling EREV models in China in 2025, reflecting the format's concentration in large family vehicles where range confidence and premium interior space are the primary purchase criteria. The sedan segment was led by more affordable models, with Changan's Deepal SL03/L07 targeting buyers seeking an accessible entry point to the EREV format at starting prices of approximately USD 17,000–18,000.

=== Models ===
Best-selling EREVs by all-time global sales
Rank	Model	Manufacturer	All-time global sales	2025	2024	2023	2022	2021	2020
1	AITO M7 EREV	Seres Group	392,821	109,531	193,599	68,465	21,226	-	-
2	Li L6	Li Auto	358,190	165,933	192,257	-	-	-	-
3	Li L7	Li Auto	347,059	78,952	134,018	134,089	-	-	-
4	Li L9	Li Auto	284,379	45,212	85,817	114,377	38,973	-	-
5	Li L8	Li Auto	255,123	44,028	77,623	117,990	15,482	-	-
6	AITO M9 EREV	Seres Group	243,182	103,670	139,512	-	-	-	-
7	Li One	Li Auto	211,482	-	-	9,576	78,791	90,491	32,624
8	Chevrolet Volt / Opel/Vauxhall Ampera	General Motors	184,000+	-	-	-	-	-	80
9	Deepal S07 EREV	Changan	179,977	39,996	85,810	54,171	-	-	-
10	AITO M5 EREV	Seres Group	126,718	25,418	30,596	21,799	48,905	-	-

== Industry reception ==
Great Wall Motor (GWM) publicly rejected extended-range technology, with company president Mu Feng and chairman Wei Jianjun both stating at the 2025 Shanghai Auto Show that the company would not produce EREVs due to its technical drawbacks. GWM claimed that its internal testing found that the series energy chain, which is combustion to electricity generation to motor to wheels, produces efficiency losses of at least 13% compared to direct-drive powertrains at medium and high speeds. At the January 2026 launch of its GWM One multi-powertrain platform, which supports BEV, HEV, PHEV, conventional engine, and hydrogen fuel cell configurations, the company reiterated it would exclude range extender architectures.

Yang Yusheng, a member of the Chinese Academy of Engineering, argued that extended-range technology is not a transitional measure but a durable automotive technology, and predicting that EREVs and PHEVs together could account for approximately 55% of Chinese vehicle sales by 2030.

Hyundai Motor Company, which announced an EREV development programme targeting 2026–2027 production, described the format as a deliberate bridge product designed to allow consumers to transition toward full electrification by building familiarity with electric driving before committing to a battery-only vehicle.

The prospect of EREVs entering the European market prompted debate over their strategic and industrial implications. German Chancellor Friedrich Merz lobbied fellow EU leaders at an informal summit in Copenhagen in October 2025 to allow EREVs as a compliance pathway alongside battery electric vehicles under the EU's 2035 combustion engine phase-out framework, arguing for technology neutrality in meeting CO_{2} targets. T&E opposed the proposal on both environmental and industrial grounds, arguing that EREVs offered limited strategic benefit to European manufacturers given that the technology was almost entirely developed and controlled by Chinese producers, and that endorsing the format as a compliance route would primarily benefit Chinese exporters. Volkswagen also expressed scepticism about EREVs' relevance for the European market.

A McKinsey survey published in early 2025 found that 18% of car buyers in the United States would consider an EREV over a conventional hybrid, plug-in hybrid, or battery electric vehicle if given the option, the highest share of any market surveyed.

== List of production extended-range electric vehicles ==
- Aion i60 EREV (2025–present)
- Aistaland GT7 EREV (2026–present)
- Aistaland GX7 (2026–present)
- AITO M5 EREV (2022–present)
- AITO M6 EREV (2026–present)
- AITO M7 EREV (2022–present)
- AITO M8 EREV (2025–present)
- AITO M9 EREV (2023–present)
- Arcfox Wendao V9 (2026–present)
- Arcfox αS5 EREV (2024–present)
- Arcfox αT5 EREV (2023–present)
- Arcfox αT7 EREV (2026–present)
- AUDI E7X EREV (2026–present)
- Avatr 06 EREV (2025–present)
- Avatr 07 EREV (2024–present)
- Avatr 11 EREV (2024–present)
- Avatr 12 EREV (2025–present)
- Avatr T09 (upcoming 2026)
- BAW Ruisheng M8 (2024–present)
- BAW Ruisheng Wangpai M7 (2022–present)
- Beijing BJ40e (2025–present)
- Beijing BJ60 Thunder (2024–present)
- BMW i3 REx (2013–2022)
- Buick Electra L7 EREV (2025–present)
- Cadillac ELR (2013–2016)
- Changan Hunter / Changan Nevo Hunter K50 / Deepal Hunter K50 (2023–present)
- Changan Nevo A06 EREV (2023–present)
- Changan Nevo A07 EREV (2023–present)
- Changan Nevo E07 / Deepal E07 EREV (2024–present)
- Changan Nevo Q06 EREV (2026–present)
- Chery Fulwin A9L (2025–present)
- Chery Fulwin T11 (2025–present)
- Chery Fulwin X3 EREV / iCaur 03 EREV / Chery J6 EREV (2025–present)
- Chevrolet/Holden Volt / Opel/Vauxhall Ampera (2010–2015)
- Chevrolet Volt (2016–2019)
- Deepal G318 (2024–present)
- Deepal L06 EREV (2025–present)
- Deepal L07 EREV (2024–present)
- Deepal S05 EREV (2024–present)
- Deepal S07 EREV (2024–present)
- Deepal S09 (2024–present)
- Deepal SL03 EREV (2022–present)
- Dongfeng eπ 007 EREV (2024–present)
- Dongfeng eπ 008 EREV (2024–present)
- Dongfeng eπ M8 EREV (2026–present)
- Epicland X9 (2026–present)
- Exeed ET5 (2025–present)
- Exeed EX7 EREV (2026–present)
- Exeed Sterra ES EREV (2023–present)
- Exeed Sterra ET EREV (2024–present)
- Fangchengbao/BYD Ti7 EREV (2025–present)
- Fangchengbao Ti9 (upcoming 2026)
- Fisker Karma (2011–2012)
- Ford Bronco New Energy EREV (2025–present)
- Forthing Xinghai S7 EREV (2025–present)
- Freelander 8 EREV (2026–present)
- Geely Boyue REV (2026–present)
- Geely Galaxy V900 (2025–present)
- Hongqi G919 (2026–present)
- Hyptec A800 (2026–present)
- Hyptec HL EREV (2025–present)
- Hyptec S600 EREV (2026–present)
- Hyundai Ioniq V EREV (upcoming 2026)
- Hyundai Santa Fe EREV (upcoming 2026)
- iCar V25 (2026–present)
- iCar V27 (2026–present)
- IM LS6 EREV (2025–present)
- IM LS8 / MG IM8 (2026–present)
- IM LS9 (2025–present)
- Karma Revero (2016–2019)
- Leapmotor C01 EREV (2022–present)
- Leapmotor C10 EREV (2024–present)
- Leapmotor C11 EREV (2021–present)
- Leapmotor C16 EREV (2024–present)
- Leapmotor D19 EREV (2026–present)
- Leapmotor D99 EREV (2026–present)
- LEVC TX (2017–present)
- LEVC VN5 (2020–present)
- Li L6 (2024–present)
- Li L7 (2023–present)
- Li L8 (2022–present)
- Li L9 (2022–present)
- Li One (2019–2022)
- Luxeed R7 EREV (2024–present)
- Luxeed V9 (2026–present)
- Maextro S800 EREV (2025–present)
- Maextro V800/V680 (2026–present)
- Mazda EZ-6 EREV (2024–present)
- Mazda EZ-60 EREV (2025–present)
- M-Hero 917 EREV (2023–present)
- M-Hero M817 (2025–present)
- M-Hero X700 (2026-present)
- Neta L EREV (2024)
- Neta S EREV (2022–2024)
- Nissan NX8 EREV (2025–present)
- Niutron NV EREV (2022, attempted)
- Ram 1500 REV (upcoming 2026)
- Rox 01 (2023–present)
- SAIC H5 EREV (2025–present)
- SAIC Z7 EREV (2026–present)
- Scout Terra Harvester (upcoming 2027)
- Scout Traveler Harvester (upcoming 2027)
- Seres SF5 (2019–present)
- Stelato G9 EREV (2026–present)
- Stelato S9 EREV (2025–present)
- Stelato S9T EREV (2025–present)
- Stelato V8 EREV (2026–present)
- Volkswagen ID. Era 8X (2026–present)
- Volkswagen ID. Era 9X (2026–present)
- Voyah Free EREV (2021–present)
- Wuling Hongguang EREV (2025–present)
- Wuling Yangguang Pro EREV (2026–present)
- Xiaomi SkyNomad N70 (2026–present)
- Xiaomi SkyNomad N90 (2026–present)
- XPeng G6 EREV (2026–present)
- XPeng G7 EREV (2026–present)
- XPeng G9L EREV (2026–present)
- XPeng GX EREV (2026–present)
- XPeng Mona L03 EREV (2026–present)
- XPeng Mona L05 EREV (2026–present)
- XPeng P7+ EREV (2026–present)
- XPeng X9 EREV (2025–present)
- Yangwang U7 EREV (2025–present)
- Yangwang U8 (2023–present)

== See also ==
- Range extender — the onboard device
- Plug-in hybrid electric vehicle
- Battery electric vehicle
- Hybrid vehicle drivetrain
- List of hybrid vehicles
