= Slate (vehicle) =

Upcoming battery-electric pickup and SUV

- A Slate pickup truck at a demo event in October 2026

Overview
- Manufacturer: Slate Auto
- Production: Expected in Q4 2026
- Assembly: United States: Warsaw, Indiana
- Designer: Tisha Johnson

Body and chassis
- Class: Compact pickup truck; Compact SUV
- Body style: 2-door pickup truck; 3-door SUV
- Layout: Rear-motor, rear-wheel-drive

Powertrain
- Electric motor: Permanent magnet synchronous
- Power output: 135 kW (181 hp; 184 PS)
- Transmission: Single-speed gear reduction
- Battery: 65 kWh LFP
- Range: 205 miles (330 km) manufacturer est. based on EPA
- Plug-in charging: AC: 11 kW; DC: 120 kW; NACS connector

Dimensions
- Wheelbase: 108.9 in (2,770 mm)
- Length: 174.6 in (4,430 mm)
- Width: 70.6 in (1,790 mm)
- Height: Pickup: 68.0 in (1,730 mm); SUV: 67.5 in (1,710 mm)
- Curb weight: Pickup: 4,048 lb (1,836 kg); SUV: 4,335 lb (1,966 kg)

The Slate is an upcoming battery-electric vehicle, the first to be manufactured by Slate Auto. It will be available for customers to order as either a compact pickup truck or SUV, and designed to be convertible between the body styles. It was unveiled for reservations on April 24, 2025, began accepting preorders on June 24, 2026, with deliveries expected to begin in late 2026.

Designed around a starting price of US$24,950, the vehicle uses a simplified design with fewer parts and omits features such as an infotainment system, speakers, and power windows. All vehicles are to be produced with an unpainted gray plastic exterior and support customization through accessories and vinyl wraps.

== Overview ==
The Slate is an upcoming electric vehicle made to be bare-bones and designed to be customizable by the owner. The starting price is US$24,950, and was originally advertised as being under US$20,000 after electric vehicle purchase incentives. After the One Big Beautiful Bill Act eliminated federal subsidies for EVs, Slate Auto stopped advertising that its truck would have a net price of under US$20,000.

=== Powertrain ===
The Slate will use a single rear-mounted motor producing 135 kilowatts (181 hp; 184 PS) and 195 pound-feet (264 N⋅m) of torque. It will have a towing capacity of 2,000 pounds (910 kg). It will have a 65 kWh battery, providing an estimated 205 miles (330 km) of range, built by Gotion and using a LFP chemistry.

A simple MacPherson strut suspension is to be used in the front and a de Dion (non-independent) axle with coil springs in the rear to keep costs low.

=== Features ===
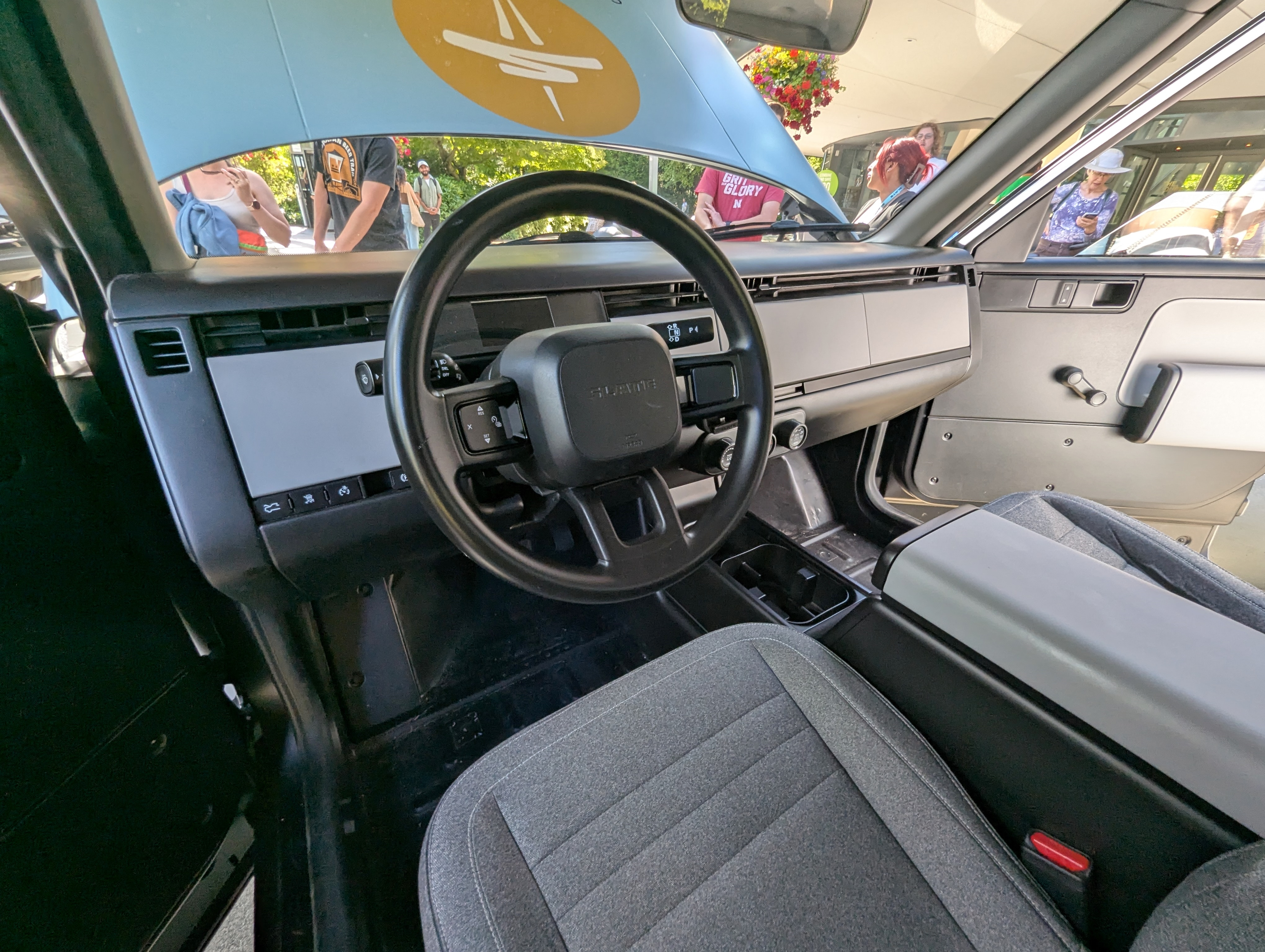
Interior of prototype Slate pickup truck on display in July 2025

The Slate's base configuration, called the "Blank Slate", will not include an infotainment system, speakers, or power windows. All units will be produced with the same unpainted gray polypropylene exterior, with vinyl wraps as the only offered way to change the exterior color. A smartphone mount will be standard, and a tablet mount optional. The Blank Slate configuration will have fabric armrests and physical climate control knobs. The company plans to offer a large number of accessories for professional or DIY installation.

Unlike most vehicles sold in the United States, the Slate does not have any in-car entertainment system or connectivity; instead, customers are expected to use their own mobile device for audio streaming, navigation, and over-the-air updates for their trucks. The vehicle will have a small driver information screen.

=== Bodystyles ===
The base Slate model will be a pickup truck, but can be configured as a 5-seat SUV with a traditional squared-off roof or a fastback roof. While customers will be able to purchase the parts to complete the conversions (roll cage, rear bench seat, and exterior shell with two additional side curtain airbags), in June 2026 the company announced it would offer the two SUV designs from the factory.

=== Service and customization ===
The company plans to provide repair guides through its Slate U platform and has announced a 10-year/110,000-mile battery and powertrain warranty. In October 2025, Slate Auto announced a partnership with RepairPal to provide owners access to a network of approximately 3,000 service locations in the United States, including more than 100 facilities capable of performing high-voltage electric vehicle repairs.

The vehicle will support extensive customization through a marketplace offering more than 200 accessories, including vinyl wraps, roof racks, audio systems, seat covers, and light covers.

== Reactions ==
Aaron Gold of Motor Trend Magazine said of the prototype Slate Vehicle he reviewed in June 2026, "It’s pretty much what we were expecting, which is a good thing, as we at MotorTrend have high hopes for this cute, inexpensive electric truck".

In May 2025, Slate said that it had accepted 100,000 refundable reservations for its truck in the three weeks since it was unveiled, compared with 250,000 reservations for the Tesla Cybertruck in its first week, and 68,000 reservations for the Rivian R2 within 24 hours of its announcement. A reservation required a US$50 deposit.

Tim Stevens of The Verge noted that other EV startups, including Fisker, VinFast, and Faraday Future, had struggled financially or failed; Jeremy Snyder, Slate's chief commercial officer, claims that the company expects to reach cash flow positivity "very shortly after the start of production." A Yahoo! Autos article stated that, for buyers who want an EV truck without the luxury price tag, the Bezos-backed Slate could be a game-changer vs. the Cybertruck.

In February 2026, Jay Leno drove a prototype Slate on Jay Leno's Garage, stating that the Slate "is able to do what a lot of electric vehicles can do, just for half the price."
