= Scout Terra =

Full-size pickup truck

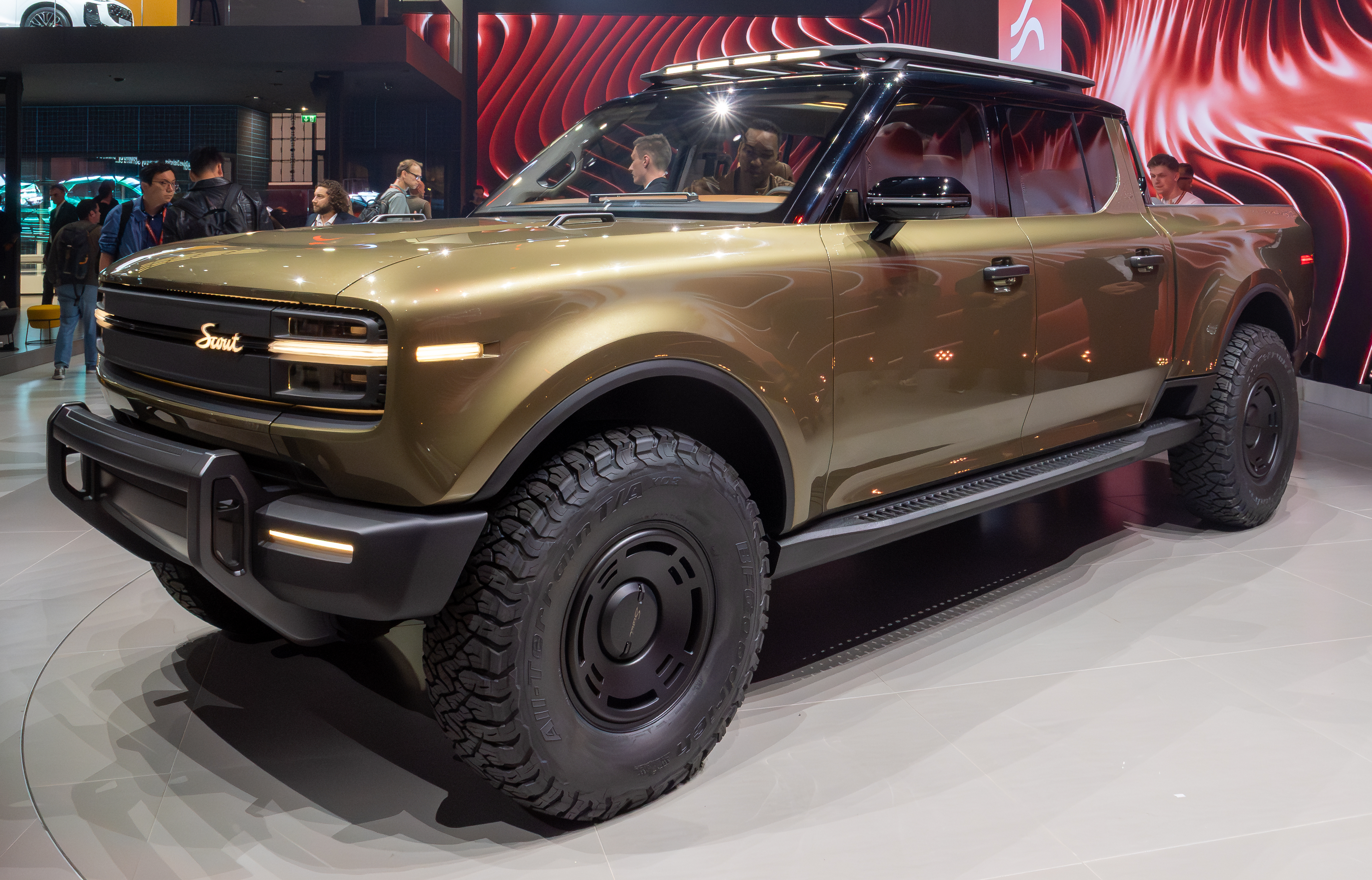
- A pre-production version of the Scout Terra at IAA Mobility 2025 in Munich, Germany. The Harvester (EREV) version is shown here.

Overview
- Manufacturer: Scout Motors
- Production: 2027 (to commence)
- Assembly: United States: Blythewood, South Carolina

Body and chassis
- Class: Full-size pickup truck
- Body style: 4-door pickup truck
- Layout: Battery electric: Dual-motor, all-wheel-drive; Extended range EV: Transverse rear-engine, dual-motor, all-wheel-drive

Powertrain
- Engine: Gasoline EREV: Volkswagen Group naturally aspirated inline 4, unknown capacity
- Hybrid drivetrain: Series hybrid (Harvester models)
- Battery: Estimated 120-130 kWh NMC (EV); Estimated 60-70 kWh NMC (EREV)
- Range: 350 mi (563 km) (EV); 500 mi (805 km) (Harvester/EREV)

Dimensions
- Wheelbase: 3,774 mm (148.6 in)
- Length: 5,822 mm (229.2 in)
- Width: Without mirrors: 2,029 mm (79.9 in); With mirrors: 2,327 mm (91.6 in)
- Height: 1,974 mm (77.7 in)

The Scout Terra is an upcoming battery electric and range-extended full-size pickup truck to be produced by Scout Motors. It is the first of two models to be sold under the Scout brand, the other being the Traveler SUV.

== Overview ==
In September 2021, reports of the Scout brand being potentially revived first appeared. Johan De Nysschen, then-CEO of Volkswagen Group of America, first floated the idea about an electric off-roader during a conversation with the media at a then-recent press event. Volkswagen gained control of the Scout trademark when Traton, the Volkswagen Group's commercial truck subsidiary, merged with Navistar in July 2021. The Scout brand's revival was confirmed on May 11, 2022, when Volkswagen approved plans to form a new independent company for the United States dedicated to designing, developing, manufacturing, and marketing electric vehicles in the country.

The Terra was officially unveiled on October 24, 2024, alongside the Traveler. It is a battery electric and range-extended full-size pickup truck that uses body-on-frame construction. The Terra and the Traveler were both designed by Scout's own R&D team in Novi, Michigan. It uses the North American Charging Standard and will be built at the company's factory in Blythewood, a town located in Greater Columbia, South Carolina. The Terra comes with a dual-cab configuration and 5.5-foot bed as standard.

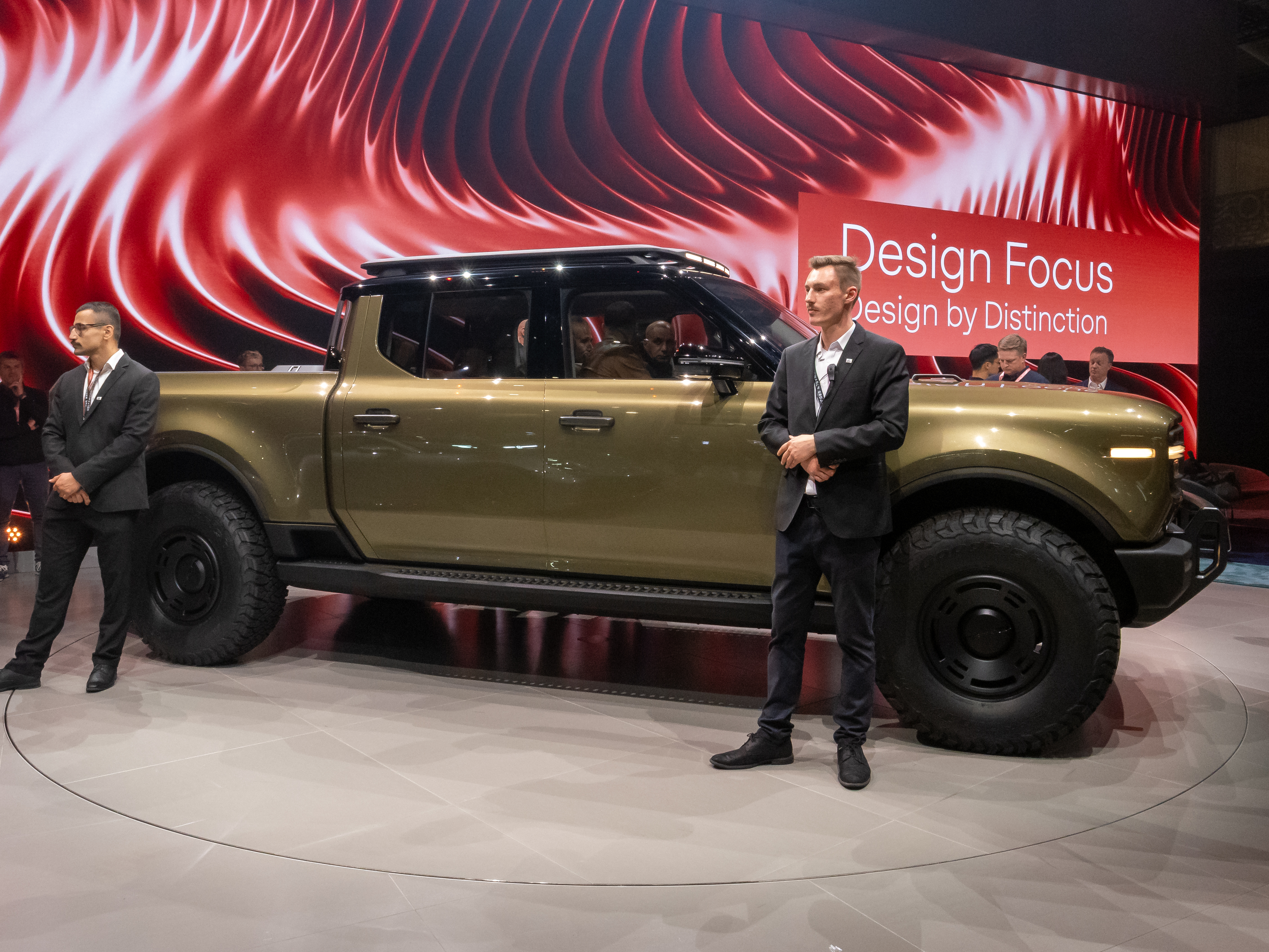
Side view

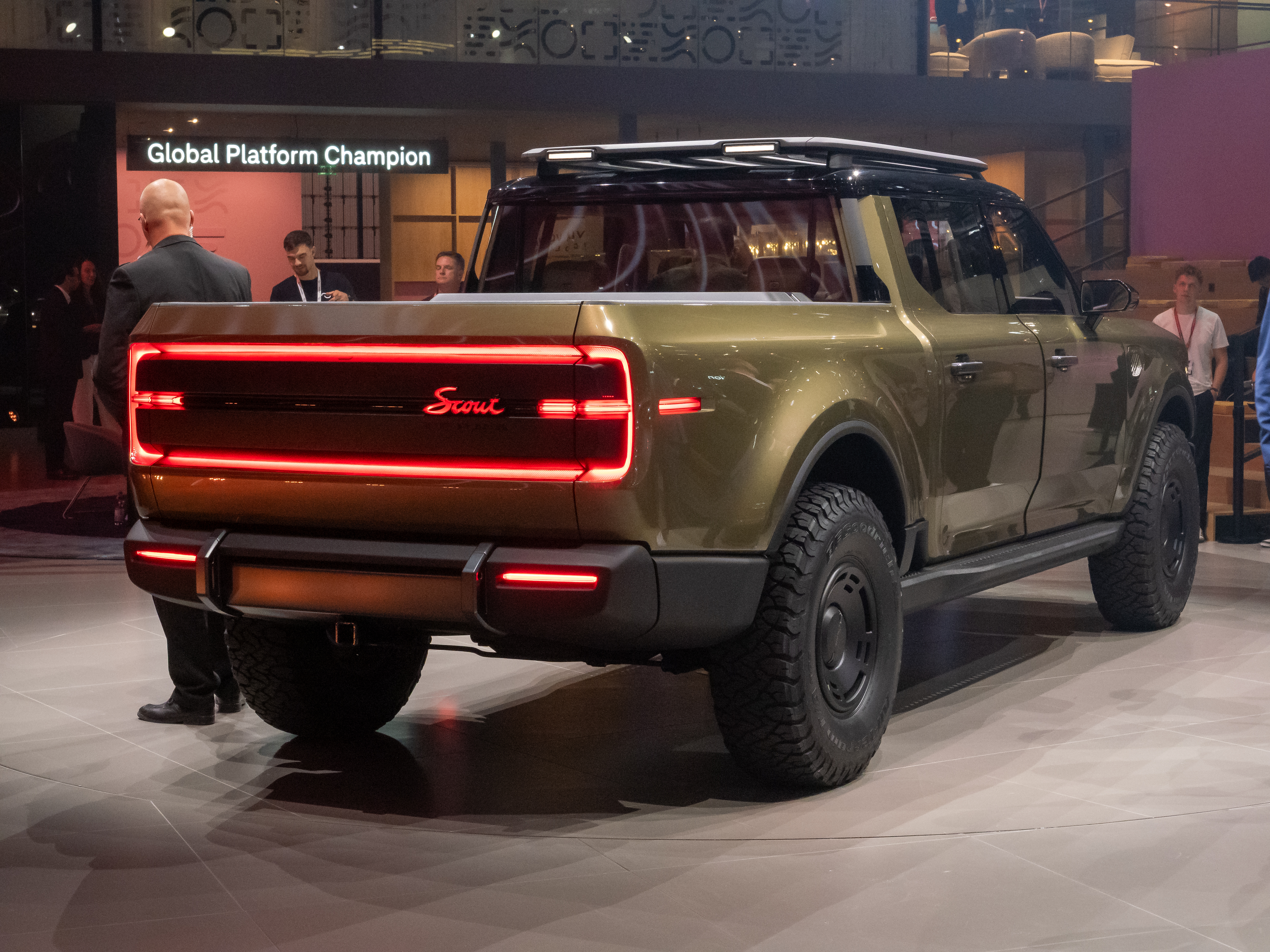
Rear view

=== Overall design and equipment ===
The interior of the Terra will use two large screens, including a large central touchscreen, and physical buttons. The Terra will offer a front bench seat as an option. The Terra's bed also features one 240-volt and two 120-volt outlets. A 120-volt outlet and USB-C power outlets are installed in the frunk. The Terra's platform can support tires that are up to 35 inches in size. Models with 33 inch tires will have the spare tire located under the bed, while models with 35 inch tires will have to use a bed-mounted spare tire carrier. The Terra uses a minimalist front end design, a fairly large skid plate, a blacked-out front grille, and simple headlights and horizontal DRLs. A small Scout logo is positioned off to the right of the grille. Blacked out wheel arches, skirts, are present. It uses rear LED wrap-around taillights that stretch the entire length of the tailgate. The interior uses a two-spoke steering wheel with a flat bottom and curved top.

== Public unveiling ==
The Terra made its public debut at Williams-Brice Stadium during a South Carolina Gamecocks football game against the Missouri Tigers on November 18, 2024. The Traveler also appeared alongside the Terra, with the pre-production Terra painted blue and the pre-production Traveler painted clay red.

== Powertrain and chassis ==
The Terra rides on a new body-on-frame platform created specifically for the Scout brand. Unlike other electric pickup trucks, it uses a rear solid axle. Mechanical locking differentials at the front and rear come standard. The Terra will be able to tow over 10,000 pounds (4,536 kg). EV models use an 800-volt architecture and are expected to produce up to 1,000 lb-ft of torque. Electric models will go up to 350 miles (563 km) on a single charge, while range-extended models, which will use a hybrid powertrain that is marketed as the Harvester, will go up to 500 miles (805 km) (150 miles electric and 350 gas) before having to recharge and refuel. It will utilize all-wheel-drive as standard. The engine to be used in Harvester models is a naturally aspirated inline 4 of unknown capacity to be manufactured by Volkswagen in Silao, Mexico. Harvester models will have the engine mounted behind the rear axle.

The BEV is set to use a nickel-manganese-cobalt (NMC) battery pack, while the EREV will have a smaller lithium-iron-phosphate (LFP) pack. The actual battery sizes are yet to be confirmed, but it is expected that EV models will use a 120 to 130 kWh battery while EREV models will use a 60 to 70 kWh battery.
