= Zeekr 7X =

Battery electric mid-size crossover SUV

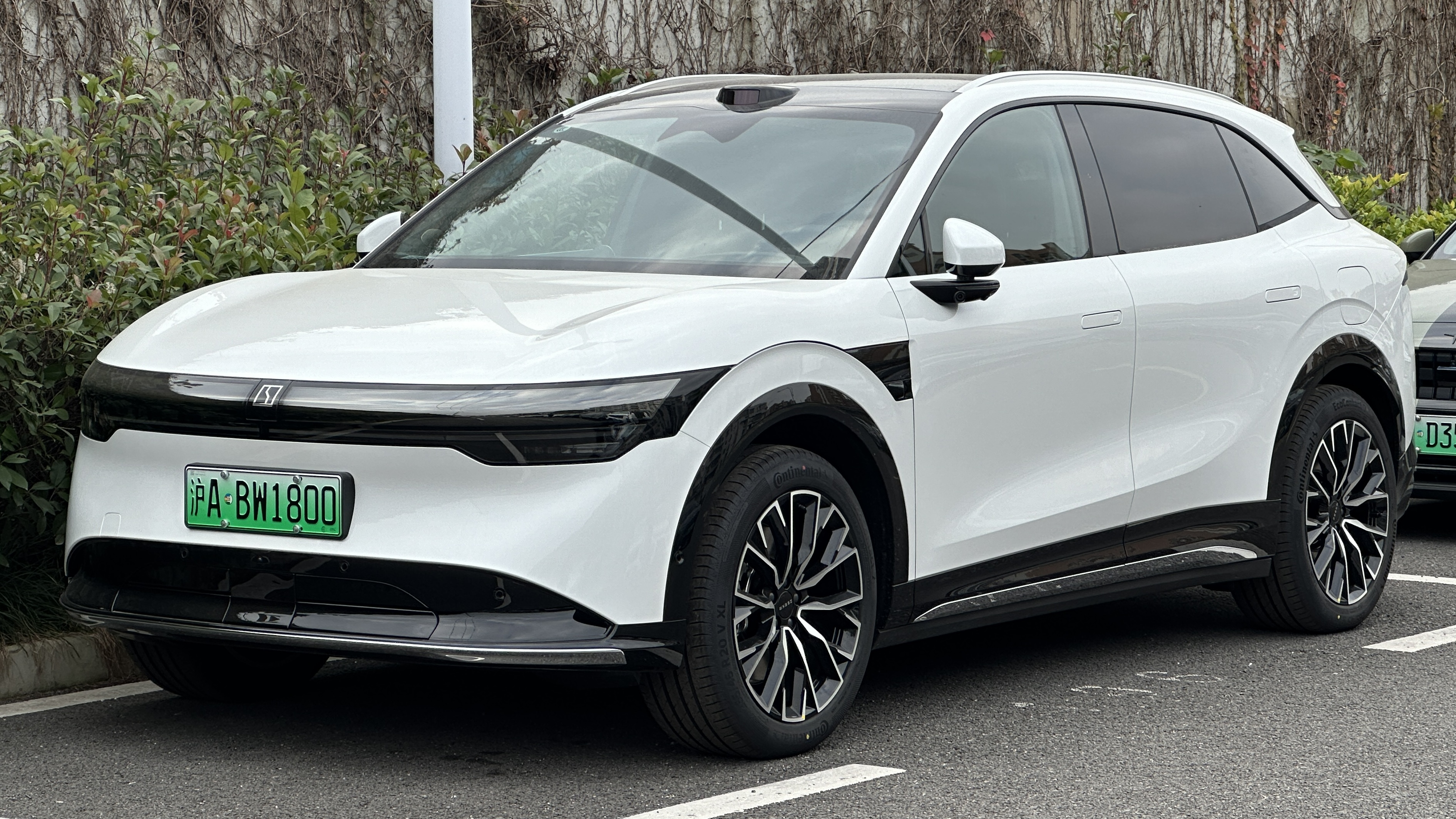

Overview
- Manufacturer: Zeekr (Geely Auto)
- Model code: CX1E
- Production: September 2024 – present
- Assembly: China: Ningbo, Zhejiang; Malaysia: Tanjong Malim (AHTV)
- Designer: Under the lead of Stefan Sielaff

Body and chassis
- Class: Mid-size crossover SUV (D)
- Body style: 5-door SUV
- Layout: Rear-motor, rear-wheel-drive; Dual-motor, all-wheel-drive
- Platform: PMA2+ platform
- Related: Zeekr 007; Smart #5

Powertrain
- Electric motor: Permanent magnet synchronous
- Power output: 310–585 kW (416–784 hp; 421–795 PS)
- Battery: 75 kWh Golden Brick LFP VREMT; 85 kWh Golden Brick LFP VREMT; 100 kWh Qilin NMC CATL; 103 kWh Qilin NMC CATL
- Electric range: 605–802 km (376–498 mi) (CLTC)

Dimensions
- Wheelbase: 2,925 mm (115.2 in)
- Length: 4,825 mm (190.0 in)
- Width: 1,930 mm (76.0 in)
- Height: 1,656–1,666 mm (65.2–65.6 in)
- Kerb weight: 2,280–2,475 kg (5,027–5,456 lb)

The Zeekr 7X (Chinese: 极氪7X; pinyin: Jíkè 7X) is a battery electric mid-size crossover SUV manufactured by Zeekr since 2024. The model occupies the Chinese B-class SUV category (D-segment globally).

== History ==
The 7X debuted at the Chengdu Auto Show in August 2024, with pre-sales starting soon after. Within 20 days, 58,429 orders were placed. The model entered production on 17 September 2024. Deliveries in China started by the end of September 2024, with global deliveries planned for 2025. The vehicle is positioned to compete with electric SUVs such as the Tesla Model Y and XPeng G6.

=== Design ===
The Zeekr 7X is built on Geely's Sustainable Experience Architecture (SEA) 800V platform shared with the similar Zeekr 007, its sedan counterpart. It features Zeekr's "Hidden Energy" design language. One of the distinguishing element of this design language is the front lights that form the Zeekr Stargate interactive LCD, which is capable of projecting messages and images.

=== Features ===
The Zeekr 7X is available with three interior colour schemes: purple and white, black and grey, and pure black. The seats are made from Nappa full-grain leather, equipped with up to 14 functions including heating, ventilation, and six massage settings. The rear seats have adjustable rake, extendable leg rests, and heating and ventilation features, which are controlled through an LED screen in the fold-down armrest. Its boot has a capacity of 765 litres (27.0 cu ft), expandable to 1,978 litres (69.9 cu ft) with the seats down, along with a 62-litre (2.2 cu ft) front storage compartment (frunk).

The interior is equipped with a 16-inch infotainment screen, a 13.5-inch instrument panel, and a 36-inch augmented reality head-up display. Rear passengers have access to 13-inch 2.5K OLED screens for entertainment. The vehicle's infotainment system is powered by a Qualcomm Snapdragon 8295 automotive chip. The gear selector is located on a steering wheel column-mounted stalk rather than on the center console like other Zeekr models.

Zeekr claims the 7X is the world's first pure electric SUV to conquer Bilutu Peak, the highest fixed dune on Earth. The vehicle's air suspension is able to raise its ground clearance to 230 mm (9.1 in).

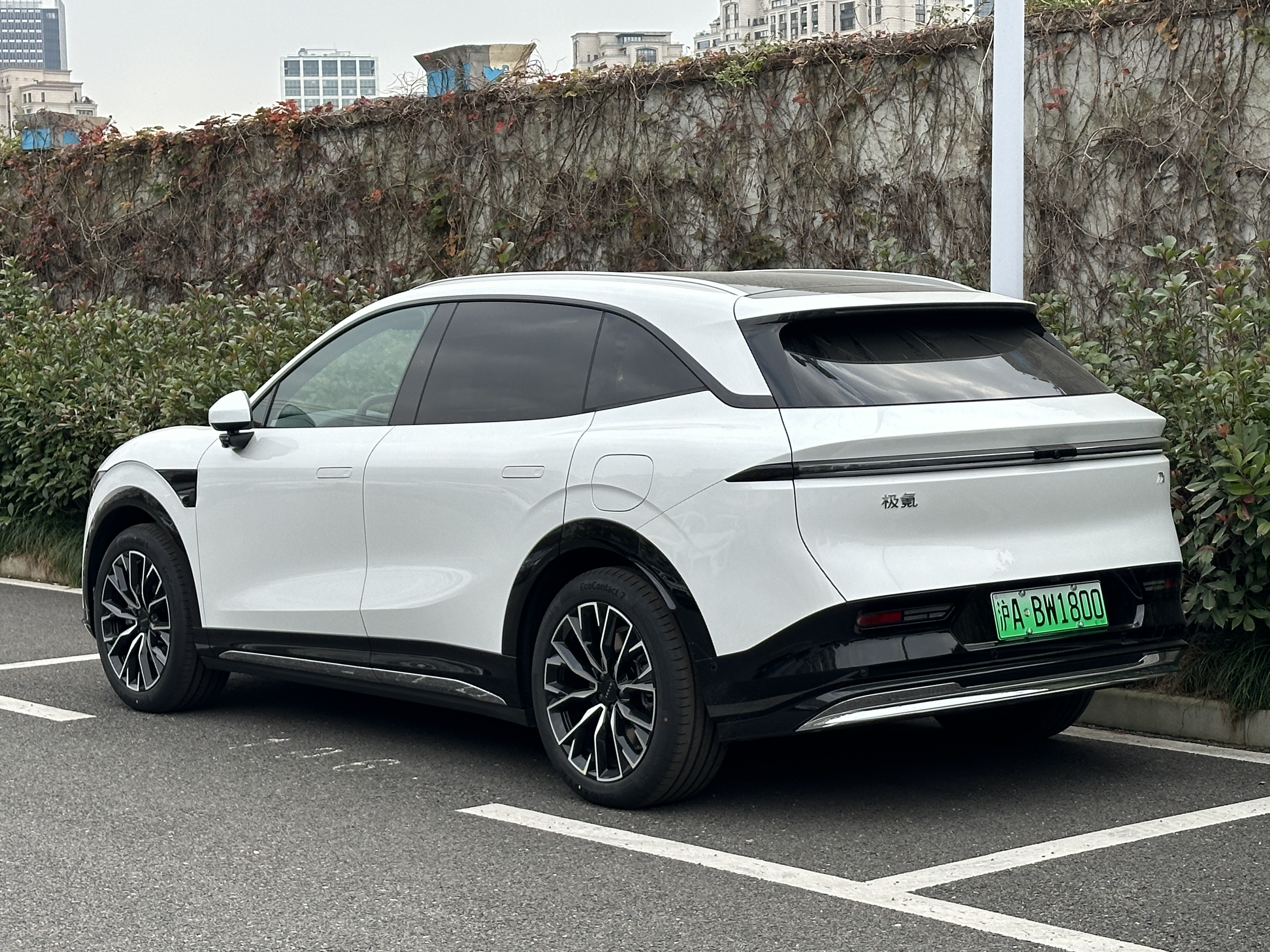
Rear view

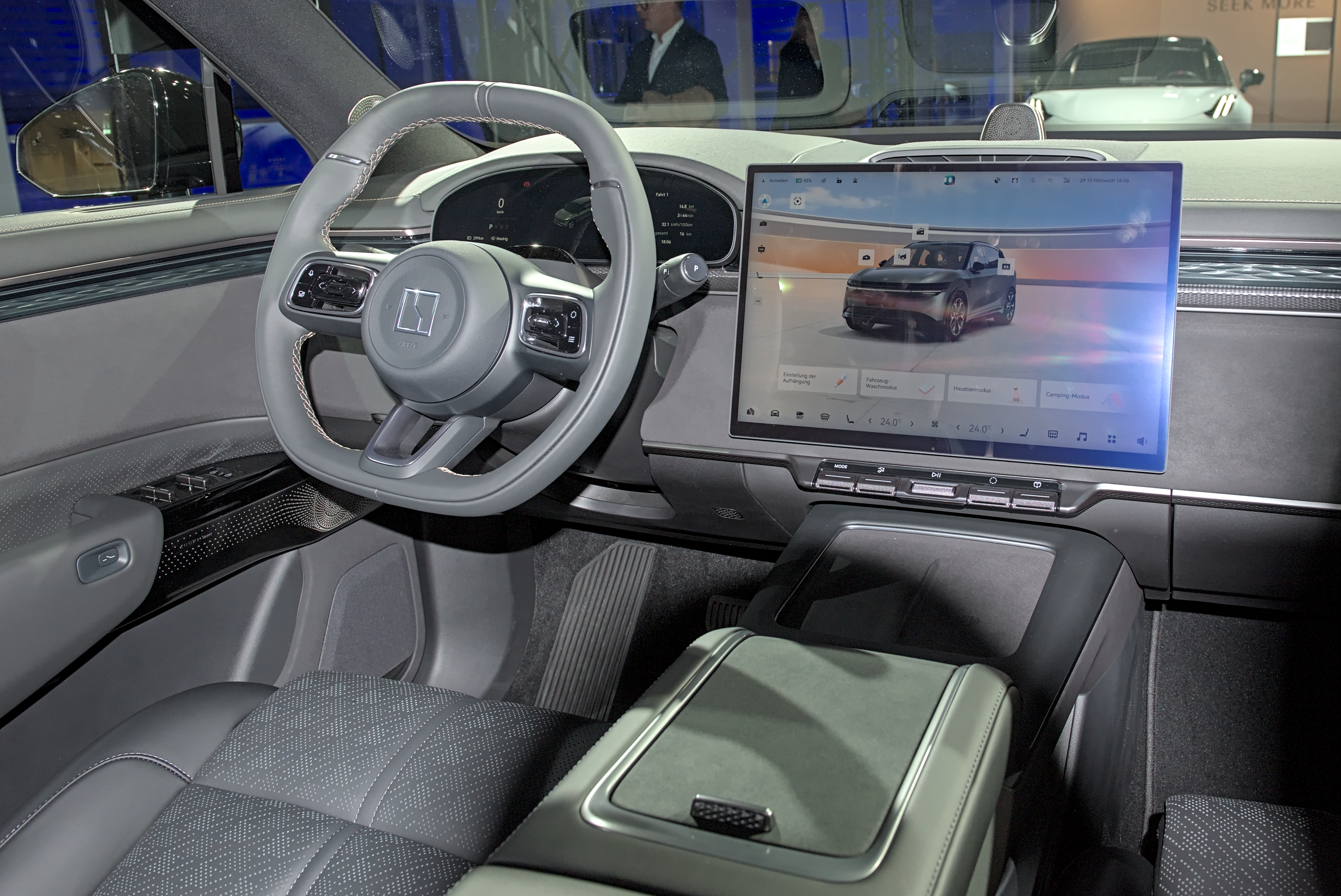
Interior

=== Facelift (MY2026) ===
The 2026 model year facelift was launched in China on 28 October 2025. The update introduces slightly redesigned front and rear end styling with an updated powertrain. The front bumper has been modified to add air ducts at the outboard ends to serve as air curtains to reduce drag, and the lighting cluster now includes teal autonomous driving indicator lights, while the rear sees the license plate relocated from the rear bumper to the tailgate.

The updated 7X comes standard with the Qianli Haohan H7 ADAS system, which has been updated with a Hesai roof-mounted LiDAR and is powered by an Nvidia Thor-U chip capable of 700 TOPS.

The updated 7X long-range variants are now based on a 900 V architecture that enables a charging time of 10 minutes from 10 to 80% state of charge. The top of the line 103 kWh AWD Ultra model now produces 795 hp (585 kW; 784 bhp) and can accelerate from 0–100 km/h (62 mph) in 2.98 seconds. The 103 kWh RWD Max model has the longest range at 802 km (498 mi) (CLTC).

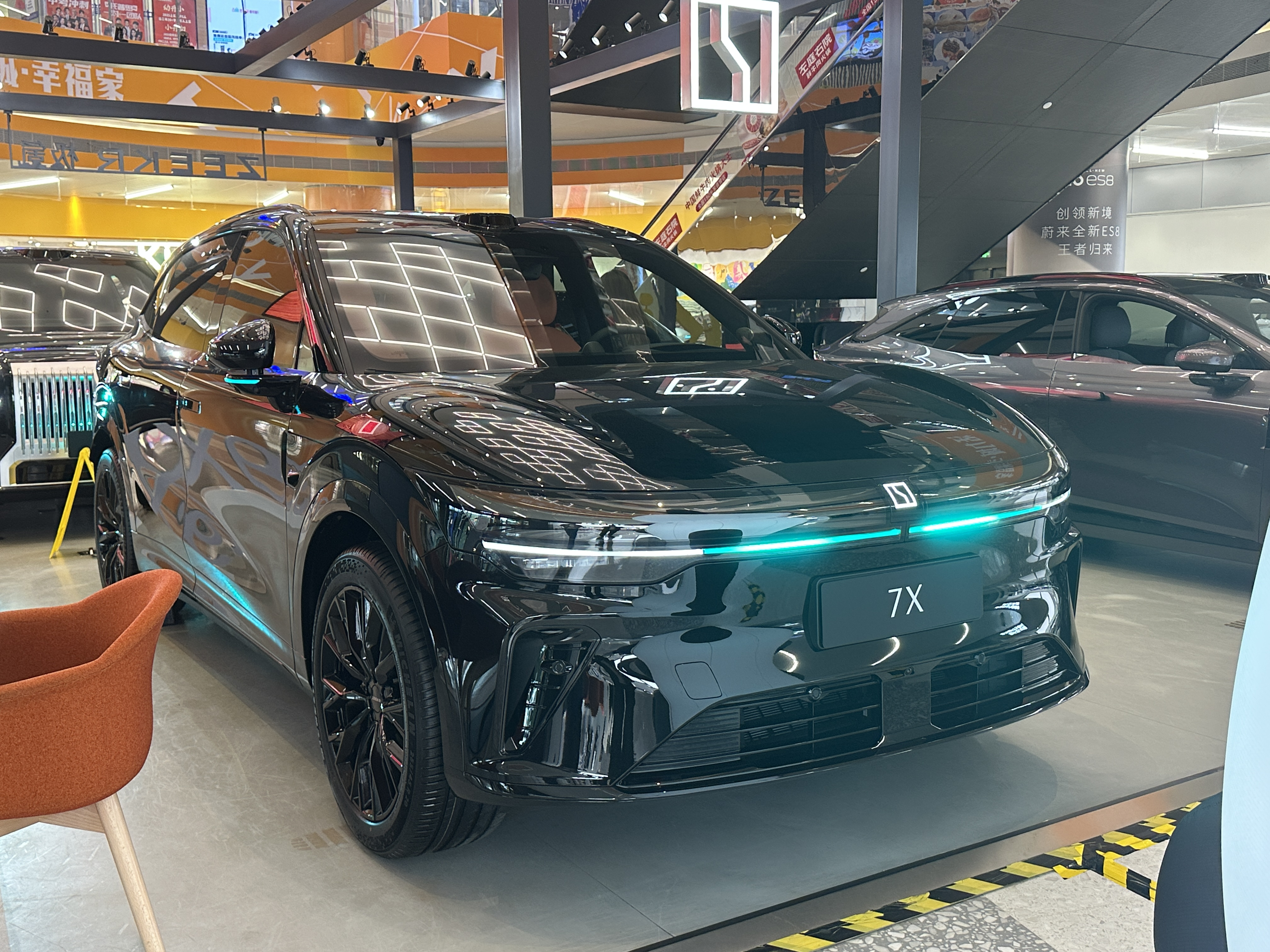
2026 Zeekr 7X

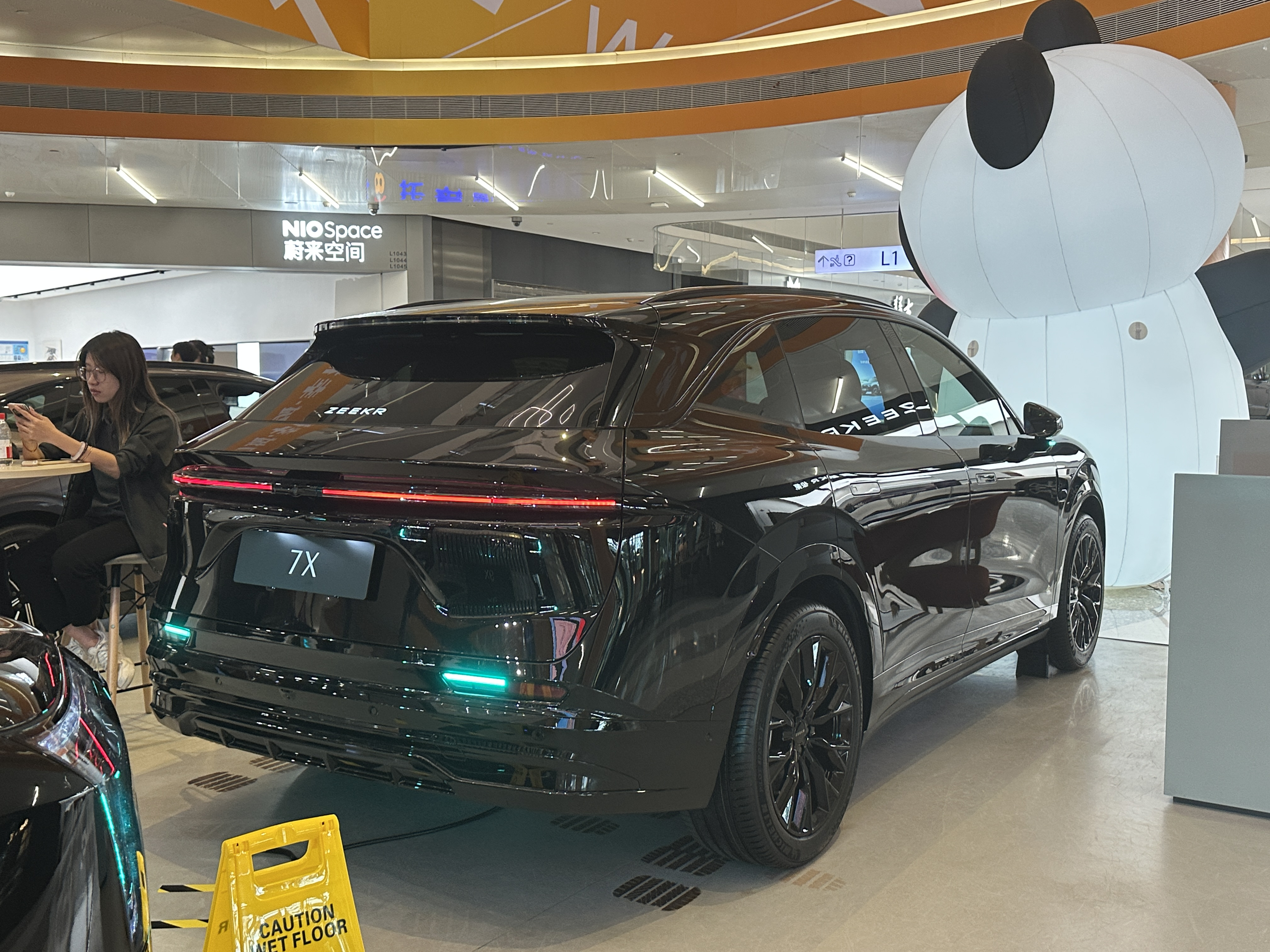
Rear view

==== 2027 update ====
The 2027 model year update was revealed on 5 November 2026. The exterior receives two new paint options, Dawn Gold and Amber Cloud Red, and the interior receives a new Brown Rice upholstery color option. Continuous damping control now comes standard on all variants, and an active road noise cancellation system targets low frequency sounds in the 60–500Hz range. The ADAS system has been updated to G-ASD 4.1 using similar hardware as before.

The powertrain has been updated to use 900-volt electronics across all configurations, and a new 85kWh battery pack has been added which provides 680 kilometres (423 mi) of range and can recharge 10–80% in 10.5 minutes.

== Safety ==
The Zeekr 7X is equipped with the Haohan 2.0 advanced driver-assistance system, also used in the Zeekr 007, that utilises one roof-mounted Robosense Lidar, 5 mmWave radars, 11 cameras, and 12 ultrasonic sensors, and supports forward autonomous emergency braking (AEB) functionality up to 120 km/h. It also supports urban driving with twin Nvidia Orin X chips that provides 508 trillions of operations per second (TOPS) of computing power. It is capable of Level 2 supervised autonomous driving in highway and urban conditions. The vehicle also introduced an industry-first feature that allows users to quickly and easily break the windows by pressing a hidden button in case of an emergency, and the world's first child smart seat with active airbags.

C-NCAP (2024) test results 2025 RWD Intelligent Driving
Category		%
Overall:	5 /5 stars	90.7%
Occupant protection:		94.27%
Vulnerable road users:		81.75%
Active safety:		91.97%

Euro NCAP test results Zeekr 7X Performance AWD (2025)
Test	Points	%
Overall:	5 /5 stars	
Adult occupant:	36.8	91%
Child occupant:	44.5	90%
Pedestrian:	49.5	78%
Safety assist:	15	83%

ANCAP test results Zeekr 7X (2025, aligned with Euro NCAP)
Test	Points	%
Overall:	5 /5 stars	
Adult occupant:	36.79	91%
Child occupant:	43.00	87%
Pedestrian:	49.49	78%
Safety assist:	14.15	78%

== Markets ==
=== Asia ===
==== Hong Kong ====
The Zeekr 7X was launched in Hong Kong in June 2025, with three variants: 7X (Standard RWD), 7X Plus (Long Range RWD) and 7X Platinum (Performance AWD).

==== Malaysia ====
The Zeekr 7X was first introduced in Malaysia in May 2025 at the 2025 Malaysia Autoshow and was launched in Malaysia on 22 August 2025. In Malaysia, it is available with three variants: RWD Standard, RWD Long Range and AWD Performance. In August 2026, the Black Nova model was made available limited to 200 units.

==== Philippines ====
The 7X was launched in the Philippines on 7 July 2025, coincided with the opening of the first Zeekr showroom in the Philippines. It is available with two variants: Long Range RWD and Performance AWD.

==== Singapore ====
The Zeekr 7X was launched in Singapore on 26 September 2025, with three variants: Standard RWD, Long Range RWD and Performance AWD.

==== South Korea ====
The Zeekr 7X was launched in South Korea on 5 June 2026, with three variants: Pro (Standard RWD), Max (Long Range RWD) and Ultra (Performance AWD).

==== Thailand ====
The Zeekr 7X was launched in Thailand on 15 August 2025, with three variants: Standard RWD, Long Range RWD and Performance AWD. In November 2026, the Black Edition AWD was made available limited to only 30 units.

=== Europe ===
The Zeekr 7X became available to order in the Netherlands, Sweden and Norway since December 2024. The vehicle will be delivered to these markets in mid-2025. In Europe, the Zeekr 7X is available in three variants, Core RWD, Long Range RWD, and Privilege AWD, the latter being a dual-motor four-wheel-drive model. The European market model is not available with the Zeekr Stargate interactive LCD on the front of the vehicle.

=== Oceania ===
==== Australia ====
The Zeekr 7X pricing and specifications for the Australian market was revealed in August 2025 and customer deliveries commenced in October 2025. It is available with three variants: RWD, Long Range RWD, and Performance AWD. In March 2026, the Black Special Edition model based on the Performance AWD variant was introduced, features black exterior accents and Onyx Black is the sole exterior colour choice.

==== New Zealand ====
The Zeekr 7X pricing and specifications for the New Zealand market was revealed in September 2025 and customer deliveries commenced in November 2025. It is available with three variants: RWD, Long Range RWD, and Performance AWD.

== Powertrain ==
The single-motor version of the Zeekr 7X features a 310 kW (416 hp; 421 PS) electric motor on the rear axle, while the all-wheel-drive version adds a 165 kW (221 hp; 224 PS) motor to the front axle for a total output of 475 kW (637 hp; 646 PS).

The 75 kWh battery uses Zeekr's 5.5C lithium iron phosphate (LFP) battery produced by Viridi E-Mobility Technology (VREMT), an affiliate of Geely Holding, which is capable of charging from 10% to 80% in 10.5 minutes. The range for the single-motor version is 605 km (376 mi) under CLTC standards, with a 0–100 km/h (0–62 mph) acceleration time of 5.8 seconds. The 100 kWh nickel manganese cobalt (NMC) battery is developed by CATL and branded as the Qilin battery, which can charge from 10% to 80% in 15 minutes. It offers a range of up to 780 km (485 mi) in the single-motor version, with a slightly faster acceleration of 5.7 seconds. The dual-motor version has a reduced range of 705 km (438 mi), and is able to accelerate from 0–100 km/h (0–62 mph) in 3.8 seconds.

=== Update (2026) ===
For the 2026 model year, the 7X received significant updates to its powertrain. The rear motor on all models was updated to a 375 kW (503 hp; 510 PS) unit, and all-wheel drive models receive an upgraded 215 kW (288 hp; 292 PS) front motor for a total of 784 hp (585 kW; 795 PS). The base 75 kWh battery carries over unchanged, but the long range variants have been upgraded to use a 900 V architecture with a slightly increased battery capacity of 103 kWh. This gives the longer range models 6C charging capabilities, with a 10–80% charge time of 10 minutes. Due to the powertrain updates and aerodynamic changes to the front bumper, all models achieve faster 0–100 km/h (62 mph) acceleration times and top speeds, and increased range, with the longest range variant now achieving 802 km (498 mi) on the CLTC cycle.

For 2027, a new 85 kWh LFP 'Golden Brick' battery pack supplied by VREMT with 900-volt electronics was added, which provides 680 kilometres (423 mi) of CLTC range and can recharge 10–80% in 10.5 minutes. The existing 75 kWh pack has been upgraded with 900-volt electronics.

Variant	Battery	Layout	Electric motor	Power	Torque	Range		10–80% DCFC time	0–100 km/h (62 mph)	Top speed	Model year
Variant	Battery	Layout	Electric motor	Power	Torque	CLTC	WLTP	10–80% DCFC time	0–100 km/h (62 mph)	Top speed	Model year
75 kWh RWD	75 kWh VREMT LFP 800V	RWD	Rear	416 hp (310 kW; 422 PS)	440 N⋅m (325 lb⋅ft)	605 km (376 mi)	480 km (298 mi)	10.5 min	5.8 sec	210 km/h (130 mph)	2024–25
100 kWh RWD	100 kWh CATL-Geely Qilin NMC	RWD	Rear	416 hp (310 kW; 422 PS)	440 N⋅m (325 lb⋅ft)	780 km (485 mi)	615 km (382 mi)	15 min	5.7 sec	210 km/h (130 mph)	2024–25
100 kWh AWD	100 kWh CATL-Geely Qilin NMC	AWD	Front	221 hp (165 kW; 224 PS)	270 N⋅m (199 lb⋅ft)	705 km (438 mi)	543 km (337 mi)	15 min	3.8 sec	210 km/h (130 mph)	2024–25
100 kWh AWD	100 kWh CATL-Geely Qilin NMC	AWD	Rear	416 hp (310 kW; 422 PS)	440 N⋅m (325 lb⋅ft)	705 km (438 mi)	543 km (337 mi)	15 min	3.8 sec	210 km/h (130 mph)	2024–25
100 kWh AWD	100 kWh CATL-Geely Qilin NMC	AWD	Combined	637 hp (475 kW; 646 PS)	710 N⋅m (524 lb⋅ft)	705 km (438 mi)	543 km (337 mi)	15 min	3.8 sec	210 km/h (130 mph)	2024–25
75 kWh Max	75 kWh VREMT LFP 800V	RWD	Rear	503 hp (375 kW; 510 PS)	535 N⋅m (395 lb⋅ft)	620 km (385 mi)		10.5 min	5.4 sec	240 km/h (149 mph)	2026
75 kWh Max	75 kWh VREMT LFP 900V	RWD	Rear	503 hp (375 kW; 510 PS)	535 N⋅m (395 lb⋅ft)	620 km (385 mi)		10.5 min	5.4 sec	240 km/h (149 mph)	2027–present
85 kWh Max+	85 kWh VREMT LFP 900V	RWD	Rear	503 hp (375 kW; 510 PS)	535 N⋅m (395 lb⋅ft)	680 km (423 mi)		10.5 min	5.1 sec	240 km/h (149 mph)	2027–present
103 kWh Max	103 kWh CATL-Geely Qilin NMC 900V	RWD	Rear	503 hp (375 kW; 510 PS)	535 N⋅m (395 lb⋅ft)	802 km (498 mi)		10 min	5.1 sec	240 km/h (149 mph)	2026–present
103 kWh Ultra	103 kWh CATL-Geely Qilin NMC 900V	AWD	Front	288 hp (215 kW; 292 PS)	277 N⋅m (204 lb⋅ft)	715 km (444 mi)		10 min	2.98 sec	255 km/h (158 mph)	2026–present
103 kWh Ultra	103 kWh CATL-Geely Qilin NMC 900V	AWD	Rear	503 hp (375 kW; 510 PS)	535 N⋅m (395 lb⋅ft)	715 km (444 mi)		10 min	2.98 sec	255 km/h (158 mph)	2026–present
103 kWh Ultra	103 kWh CATL-Geely Qilin NMC 900V	AWD	Combined	784 hp (585 kW; 795 PS)	812 N⋅m (599 lb⋅ft)	715 km (444 mi)		10 min	2.98 sec	255 km/h (158 mph)	2026–present

== Sales ==
On 8 September 2026, Zeekr announced that the 200,000th 7X had rolled off the production line.

Year	China	Australia
2024	37,656	
2025	60,771	1206
