= Lingkong Tianxing =

Chinese aerospace company

Beijing Lingkong Tianxing Technology Co., Ltd.
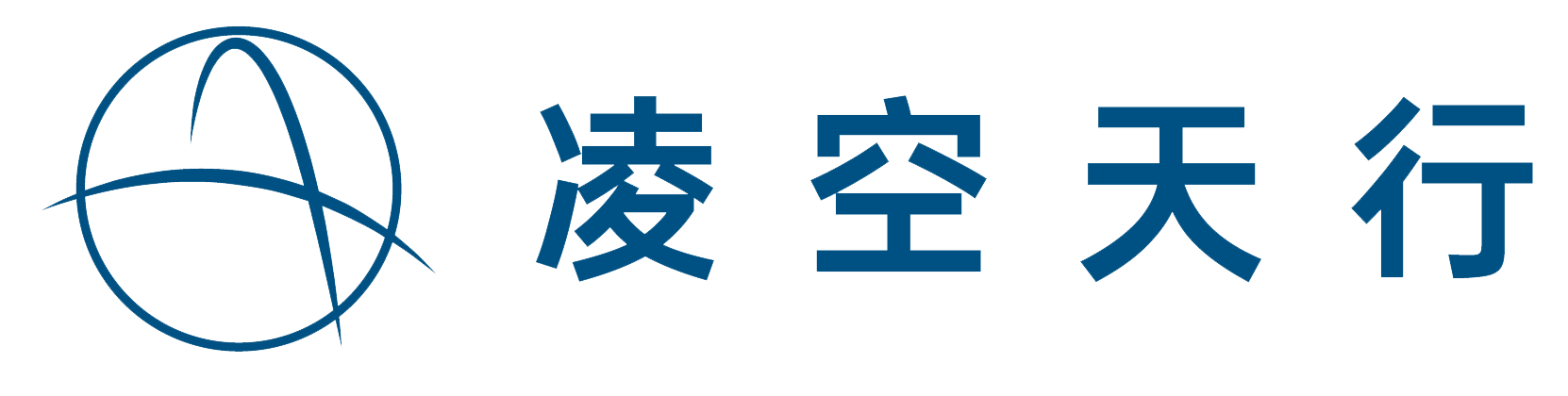
- Trade name: Space Transportation
- Native name: 北京凌空天行科技有限责任公司
- Type: Private
- Industry: Aerospace
- Founded: August 2012; 14 years ago
- Founders: Wang Yudong
- Headquarters: Beijing, China
- Key people: Wang Yudong (Chairman)
- Website: spacetransportation.com.cn

Beijing Lingkong Tianxing Technology Co., Ltd. (branded as Lingkong Tianxing or Space Transportation) is a Chinese aerospace company headquartered in Beijing. It focuses on hypersonic flight technology

== History ==
Space Transportation was founded in August 2012. Its founder Wang Yudong graduated from Nanchang Hangkong University as well as Tsinghua University and later went to work for the China Academy of Launch Vehicle Technology. Investors of the company include Matrix Partners China and Source Code Capital.

== Product history ==
=== Rockets ===
On 22 April 2019, Space Transportation carried out a test in northwest China in cooperation with Xiamen University, launching a 3,700-kilogram rocket named Jiageng-1. The joint flight was to test the performance of the dual waverider forebody configuration and to verify the rocket recovery and reuse technology.

In July 2025, Space Transportation released a video showing it was developing a reusable liquid rocket.

=== Aircraft ===
In April 2022, Space Transportation released a video showing it was developing a hypersonic passenger space plane that could fly at speeds over twice as fast as the Concorde.

In October 2024, Space Transportation stated its prototype commercial transport plane named Yunxing successfully completed its test flight travelling at Mach 4. The maiden flight target was set to 2027.

In December 2024, Space Transportation conducted the first test a detonation ramjet engine named Jindouyun or JinDou400 that was named after the cloud used by Sun Wukong.

In January 2025, Space Transportation unveiled it was developing an unmanned aerial vehicle named Cuantianhou which means soaring stone monkey which is a reference to Sun Wukong. It could reach a cruise speed of Mach 4.2

=== Hypersonic weapons ===
On 25 November 2025, Space Transportation revealed it was developing the YKJ-1000, a hypersonic missile that could travel at speeds between Mach 5 and Mach 7. It came at a significantly lower price than competitors with rumors each missile would only cost 700,000 yuan. The reveal attracted media attention with China Central Television stating if the product was introduced on the international defense market it would have a huge impact as it could empower smaller nations to challenge major military powers.

== See also ==
- i-Space
- Galactic Energy
- LandSpace
- LinkSpace
