= Li i6 =

Battery electric mid-size luxury SUV

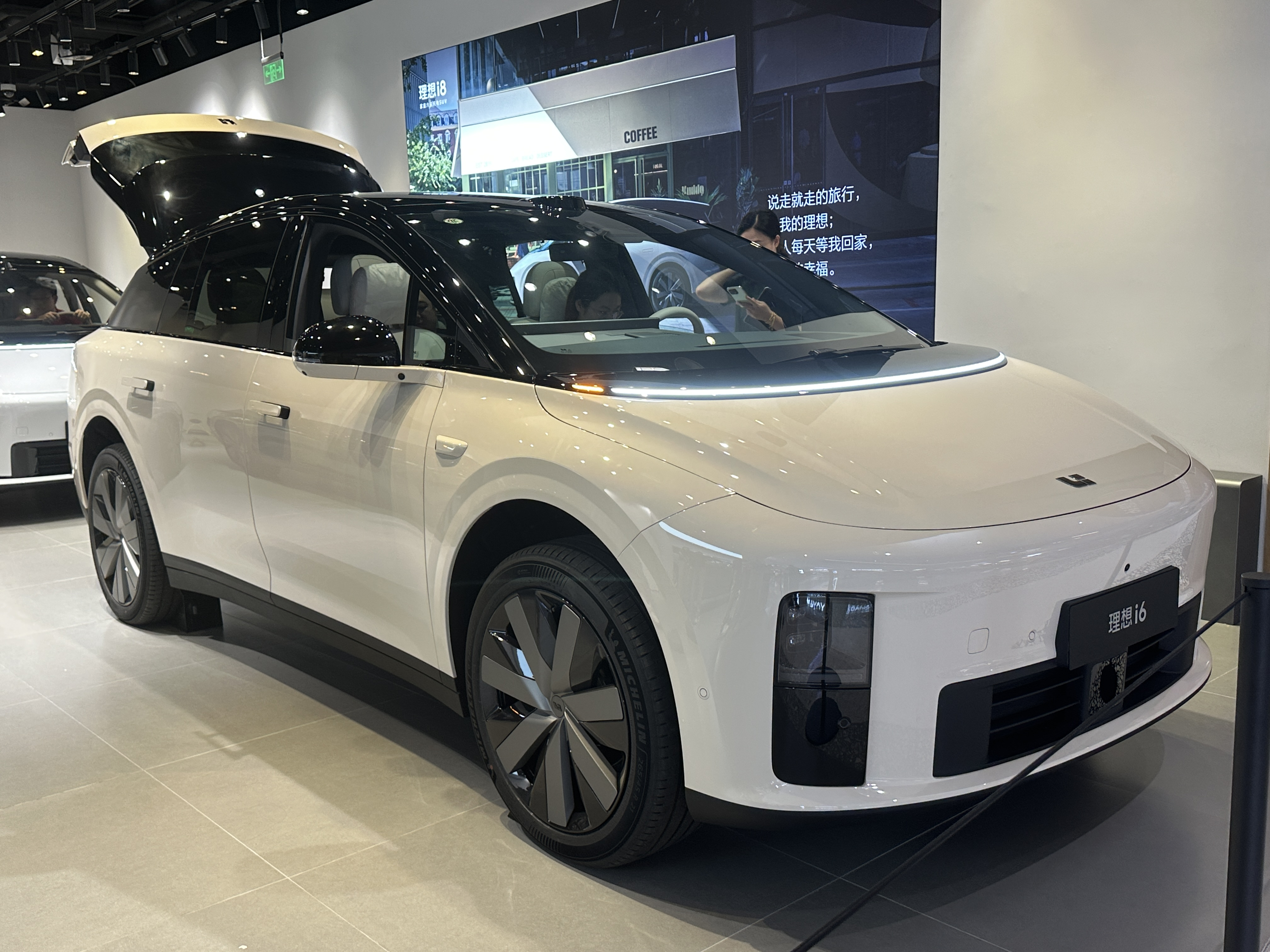

Overview
- Manufacturer: Li Auto
- Also called: Lixiang i6; Li 6 (Europe)
- Production: 2025–present
- Assembly: China: Changzhou, Jiangsu
- Designer: Ben Baum

Body and chassis
- Class: Mid-size luxury SUV
- Body style: 5-door SUV
- Layout: Rear-motor, rear-wheel-drive; Dual-motor, all-wheel-drive
- Related: Li i8; Li i9; Li Mega

Powertrain
- Electric motor: 150 kW YS210XY103 induction (front); 250 kW TZ220XYHP1 PMSM (rear)
- Power output: 335–536 hp (250–400 kW; 340–543 PS)
- Battery: 87.3 kWh LFP CATL/Sunwoda; 96 kWh Lianshan LFP CALB
- Electric range: 660–780 km (410–485 mi)
- Plug-in charging: 500+ kW 5C (DC)

Dimensions
- Wheelbase: 3,000 mm (118.1 in)
- Length: 4,950 mm (194.9 in)
- Width: 1,935 mm (76.2 in)
- Height: 1,655–1,670 mm (65.2–65.7 in)
- Curb weight: 2,380–2,515 kg (5,247–5,545 lb)

The Li i6 (Chinese: 理想i6; pinyin: Lǐxiǎng i6; lit. 'ideal i6'), marketed in Europe as the Li 6, is a battery electric luxury mid-size SUV produced by Chinese manufacturer Li Auto. It is the second vehicle in the brand's i-series, following the full-size Li i8.

== Background ==
Rear view

The i6 was first spied alongside two larger vehicles, one of which would eventually as the i8. Due to controversies surrounding the Li Mega's exterior design, all i-series cars were reworked to have a more conventional design before release. On June 20, 2025, the i6 was officially unveiled by China's Ministry of Industry and Information Technology (MIIT), revealing its final design and powertrain setup that took after the i8's.

On 26 September 2025, the i6 was went on sale, with deliveries commencing the following day.

The vehicle made its European debut on 12 October 2026 at the 2026 Paris Auto Show, where it is marketed as the Li 6. Deliveries are expected to begin in the initial markets of Norway and the Netherlands in the first quarter of 2027.

The 2026 update to the i6 is expected to launch on 28 October 2026, with deliveries expected to begin in early November 2026. Display vehicles became available in showrooms for static viewing starting 11 October 2026 with the launch originally scheduled for September, but was pushed later by one month due to delays in the vehicle's type certification that meant that customer test drives could not take place.

== Overview ==
The i6 is a two-row mid-size luxury crossover SUV, which effectively serves as the smaller two-row version of the three-row i8 launched earlier. The exterior styling closely follows that of the i8, with a short upward sloping hood with lightbar underneath the raked windshield and heavily sloping roofline with spoiler; all versions have black-painted pillars and roof.

It uses all-aluminium double-wishbone front and five-link independent rear suspension geometries with standard continuous damping control, and has optional dual-chamber air suspension. Li Auto says the i6 has a torsional stiffness of 52,014N·m/°.

The i6 has a minimalist interior, with the dashboard featuring twin 15.7-inch 3K-resolution touchscreens serving as the central infotainment touchscreen and passenger entertainment display. The driver has a narrow 4.82-inch digital instrument panel touchscreen placed at the top of the steering wheel hub, and is supplemented by a 16.8-inch heads-up display. All displays and infotainment systems are powered by a Qualcomm Snapdragon 8295P with 24GB of RAM, which is upgraded to the 8295P performance edition with 32GB of RAM when the 21.4-inch 3K-resolution rear passenger entertainment is optioned. The center console features dual 50-watt active-cooled wireless charging pads, two cupholders, and a split-opening storage bin featuring an 8.8-litre (0.31 cu ft) refrigerator-heater compartment.

Other features include a 7.3.4 surround sound 20-speaker Platinum audio system with Dolby Atmos, rear-row sunshades, standard heating and ventilation functions for all seats, standard memory and 10-point massage functions for the front row seats, panoramic sunroof with power sunshade, acoustic glass side windows, sunshades for the rear windows, footrest for the right rear passenger, and optional soft-close doors. The rear cargo area measures 728 litres (25.7 cu ft).

The i6 is equipped with Li Auto's AD Max ADAS system, which has a sensor suite consisting of one 116-line roof-mounted Hesai ATL LiDAR, one mmWave radar, 11 cameras, and 12 ultrasonic sensors, along with an Nvidia Thor-U chip capable of 700 TOPS, which is capable of supervised Level 2 autonomous driving in highway and urban conditions.

=== 2026 refresh ===
For 2026, the i6 gets updated with features and equipment first introduced in the higher-end i9. The first details of the update were revealed on 9 October 2026, followed by technology details on 22 October and launch on 28 October, with deliveries beginning on 29 October.

The exterior receives minor changes, including pocket style door handles replacing the previous retractable handles to meet new Chinese safety regulations and two new paint colors: Hyacinth Purple and Magnetic Blue. It has new matrix ADB headlights with cornering assist found in the updated Mega, which Li Auto says has a 16% wider low beam of 25.8 metres (85 ft) at a distance of 20 metres (66 ft), and 27% brighter high beam which reaches 243 metres (797 ft). Additionally, the frunk is now power operated and can be opened by knocking on the hood or exterior voice command, and the ultrasonic sensors have been replaced with UWB sensors for a cleaner look. The listed vehicle height has been lowered by 15 mm (0.59 in) to 1,655 mm (65.2 in).

Li Auto says the steering system has been upgraded to be more responsive, and the brake pedal has been tuned to be firmer and provide a more linear response.

The interior has been updated with a new 29-inch 6K-resolution wide touchscreen replacing the previous dual screens, and it is now powered by a Qualcomm Snapdragon 8797 SoC, which Li Auto says has 1.8 times faster CPU performance, 2.6 times faster GPU, and 3.5 times better NPU performance. The infotainment system has been updated to take advantage of the new single wide screen and is now compatible with Apple Carplay, Huawei HiCar, and ICCOA CarLink. The steering wheel has been updated to remove the small display. A screw mount and USB-C power port for mounting dashcams has been added behind the rearview mirror, and the infotainment system now has native Bluetooth connectivity for Insta360 dashcams.

The front row seats now have a 150 'zero gravity' recline mode with extending heated legrests, and have been upgraded from 10-point to 18-point massage, and the underside of the dashboard has been reshaped to provide more legroom when reclining. The i6 now has 5-zone climate control which can set foot temperature independently via voice control. The rear entertainment display is upgraded to 4K-resolution, the refrigerator now has a power door and freezing capabilities with a temperature range of −6–50 °C (21–122 °F), the passenger side rear seat has a 140 'queen seat' recline mode with footrest, the outboard rear seats each have ceiling mounted illuminated vanity mirrors with adjustable color temperature, and the rear 67-watt USB-C charging port has been moved to the folding armrest for convenience while in the recline mode.

The ADAS system has been upgraded to use the newer Hesai ATL-P roof-mounted LiDAR and 8 UWB sensors replacing the previous 12 ultrasonic sensors, and is now powered by Li Auto's self-developed Mach M100 chip capable of 1280 TOPS, which Li Auto says has an effective utilization rate exceeding 82%. The system can be optionally upgraded to use an additional three side- and rear-facing wide-angle LiDARs and another Mach M100 chip, for a total of 1280 TOPS.

The powertrain has been upgraded with a new, larger, self-developed Lianshan (Chinese: 连山; pinyin: lián shān) 96 kWh battery pack, which provides CLTC range ratings of up to 780 kilometres (485 mi) and continues to be capable of 5C recharging speeds. Li Auto says that designing the battery in-house allows for better integration with the vehicle, and in the case of the i6 the battery pack could better conform with the vehicle floor, resulting in 2.6 kWh larger battery capacity. Additionally, the new in-house motor design allows for proprietary placement of the high-voltage terminals, resulting in the distance between the input and switching transistor to be reduced to 3 mm (0.12 in). Li Auto says that with the use of waste heat recovery, thermal management, and self-developed algorithms, the i6 achieves 30 kilometres (19 mi) longer range in cold-weather conditions where LFP battery chemistries typically suffer.

Li Auto says it will launch a program in December 2026 for old i6s to receive paid upgrades to install the new power frunk feature.

== Powertrain ==
The i6 is a battery electric vehicle which has a similar powertrain to the larger of the i8.

The i6 is equipped with Li Auto's self-developed 800-volt silicon carbide power electronics and electric motors. Li Auto claims that the battery pack has a lower resistance than both LFP and NMC packs at low temperatures, and has a resistance of 0.36 mΩ at room temperature.

All versions are equipped with a permanent magnet synchronous rear motor outputting 335 hp (250 kW; 340 PS) and 425 N⋅m (313 lb⋅ft) of torque, while all-wheel drive variants add a front induction motor that outputs 201 hp (150 kW; 204 PS) and 235 N⋅m (173 lb⋅ft) of torque for a total of 536 hp (400 kW; 543 PS) and 660 N⋅m (487 lb⋅ft) of torque. This allows for a 0–100 km/h (62 mph) time of 4.5 seconds, which Li Auto claims will take less than 0.5 seconds longer when at 20% battery charge, and Li Auto also claims the i6 can maintain 120 km/h (75 mph), climb hills, and navigate parking garages at very low charge.

All variants of the i6 are equipped with an 87.3 kWh LFP battery pack supplied by CATL, which provides CLTC range ratings of 720 km (447 mi) for rear-wheel drive and 660 km (410 mi) for all-wheel drive models. It is capable of peak charging rates of 500 kW, allowing for a 10–80% recharge time of 11 minutes and to replenish 500 km (311 mi) of range within 10 minutes.

For the 2026 update, the battery has been upgraded to Li Auto's in-house Lianshan (Chinese: 连山; pinyin: lián shān) LFP battery, which has a larger capacity of 96 kWh and uses Li Auto-designed battery cells manufactured by CALB. CLTC range ratings increase to 780 and 710 kilometres (485 and 441 mi) for rear- and all-wheel drive variants, respectively, and the pack continues to be capable of recharging from 10–80% in 11 minutes. The motors are now Li Auto self-developed units with unchanged power outputs, but top speed increases by 20 km/h (12 mph) to 200 km/h (124 mph).

Specifications
Model	Battery		Power	Torque	Range	0–100 km/h (62 mph)	Top speed	Kerb weight
Model	Type	Weight	Power	Torque	CLTC	0–100 km/h (62 mph)	Top speed	Kerb weight
2025 RWD	87.3075 kWh LFP CATL	620 kg (1,367 lb)	335 hp (250 kW; 340 PS)	425 N⋅m (313 lb⋅ft)	720 km (447 mi)	6.5 sec	180 km/h (112 mph)	2,380 kg (5,247 lb)
2025 AWD	87.3075 kWh LFP CATL	620 kg (1,367 lb)	536 hp (400 kW; 543 PS)	660 N⋅m (487 lb⋅ft)	660 km (410 mi)	4.5 sec	180 km/h (112 mph)	2,515 kg (5,545 lb)
2026 RWD	96 kWh LFP CALB	655 kg (1,444 lb)	335 hp (250 kW; 340 PS)	425 N⋅m (313 lb⋅ft)	780 km (485 mi)	6.8 sec	200 km/h (124 mph)	2,395 kg (5,280 lb)
2026 AWD	96 kWh LFP CALB	655 kg (1,444 lb)	536 hp (400 kW; 543 PS)	660 N⋅m (487 lb⋅ft)	710 km (441 mi)	4.8 sec	200 km/h (124 mph)	2,585 kg (5,699 lb)

== Sales ==
Within 5 minutes of its launch, the i6 received over 10,000 pre-orders. The 80,000th i6 was produced on 20 March 2026. Beginning in March 2026, the i6 maintained monthly deliveries exceeding 20,000 units for four consecutive months, and accounted for 69% of the brand's total sales for the month of June 2026. On 30 October 2026, the 200,000th i6 rolled off the production line.

Sales	China
2025	30,329
