= Li Mega =

Battery electric minivan

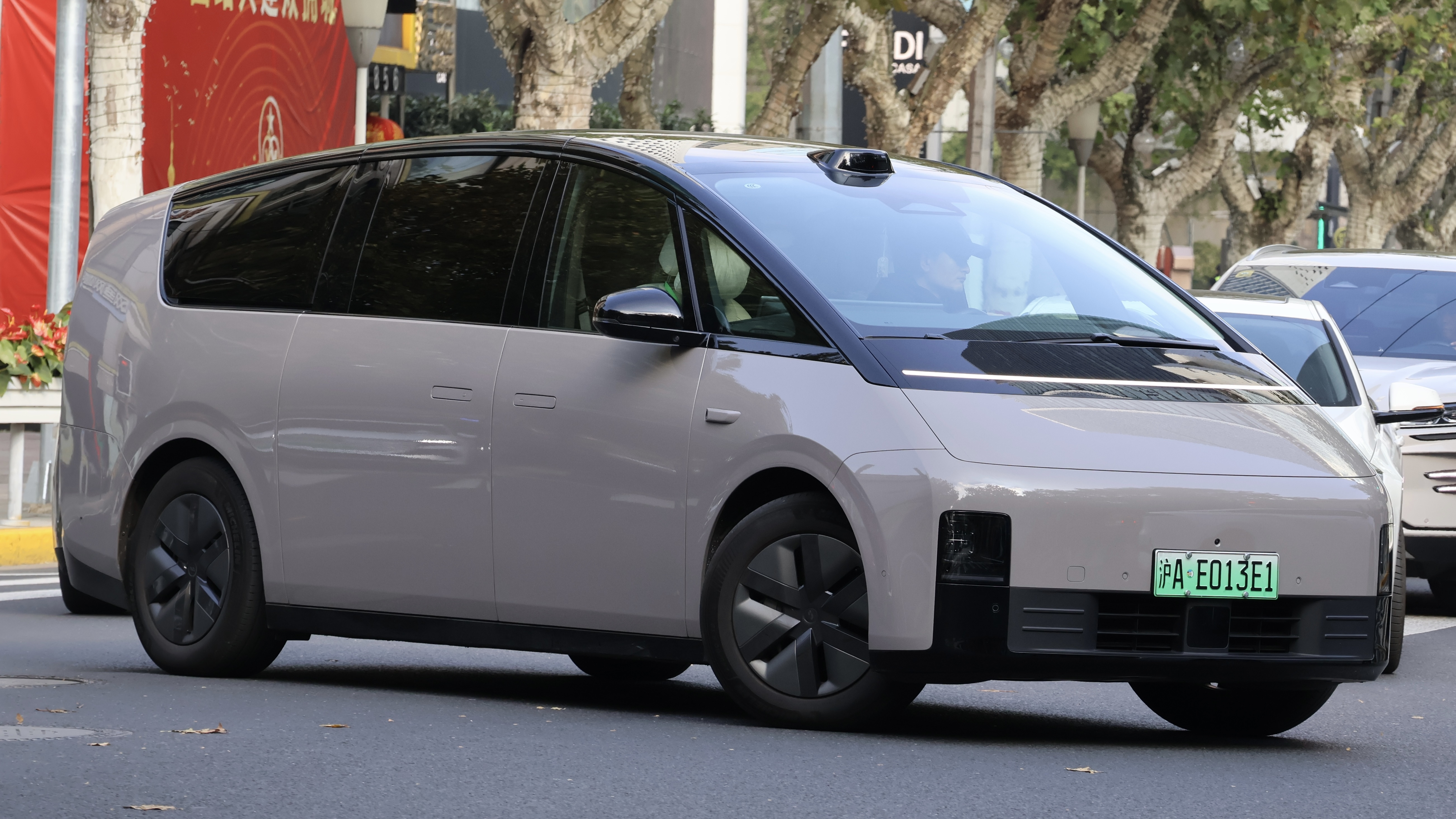

Overview
- Manufacturer: Li Auto
- Model code: W01
- Also called: Lixiang Mega
- Production: 2024–present
- Assembly: China: Beijing
- Designer: Ben Baum

Body and chassis
- Class: Minivan
- Body style: 5-door minivan
- Layout: Dual-motor, all-wheel-drive
- Related: Li i6; Li i8; Li i9

Powertrain
- Electric motor: 245 kW permanent magnet synchronous; 155 kW asynchronous induction
- Power output: 400 kW (536 hp; 544 PS)
- Battery: 102.7 kWh CATL Qilin NMC
- Electric range: 710 km (441 mi) (CLTC)
- Plug-in charging: DC: 520 kW (official), 552 kW (actual); V2L: 3.5 kW

Dimensions
- Wheelbase: 3,300 mm (129.9 in)
- Length: 5,350 mm (210.6 in); 5,355 mm (210.8 in) (facelift)
- Width: 1,965 mm (77.4 in)
- Height: 1,850 mm (72.8 in)
- Curb weight: 2,785 kg (6,140 lb)

The Li Mega (Chinese: 理想MEGA; pinyin: Lǐxiǎng MEGA; lit. 'ideal MEGA', stylized in all caps) is a battery electric minivan produced by Chinese manufacturer Li Auto since 2024. It is the first battery electric vehicle from Li Auto, as the previous models are all extended range electric vehicles (EREV).

== Overview ==
The Mega was introduced in November 2023 at the Auto Guangzhou, where pre-orders were accepted. The minivan is notable for its distinctive exterior design, which contributes in aerodynamics with a wind resistance drag coefficient of just 0.215 Cd, the lowest among multi-purpose vehicles (MPVs) globally currently in production.

The Mega has a double-wishbone front suspension and a multi-link setup in the rear, with air suspension and continuous damper control, with the capability of up to 70 mm (2.8 in) of ride height adjustment.

The dashboard contains a steering wheel with a small information touchscreen mounted directly on its central hub supplemented by an AR head up display for instrument cluster functions, and floating dual 3K 15.6-inch touchscreens used as the central infotainment display and the passenger entertainment system, all powered by a Qualcomm Snapdragon 8295P SoC. The center console has dual 50-watt wireless charging pads and dual cupholders, behind which lies a central armrest with a storage bin, inside of which is a refrigerator compartment.

The Mega has a seven seat 2+2+3 seating layout, with all seats except the center third row being heated. The driver's seat has adjustable cushion firmness and bolstering. The second row features captains' chairs, which have 16-point massaging functionality along with the first row. There are seatback mounted tray tables, and a ceiling-mounted 17-inch entertainment display. Audio is provided by a 21-speaker system.

All Megas have Li Auto's AD Max supervised autonomous driving system, with support for a navigation on autopilot system. It has an array 25 sensors, including a Hesai LiDAR, a mmWave radar, 11 cameras and 12 ultrasonic sensors. Processing is provided by two NVIDIA Orin-X chips capable of 508 TOPS of computation combined.

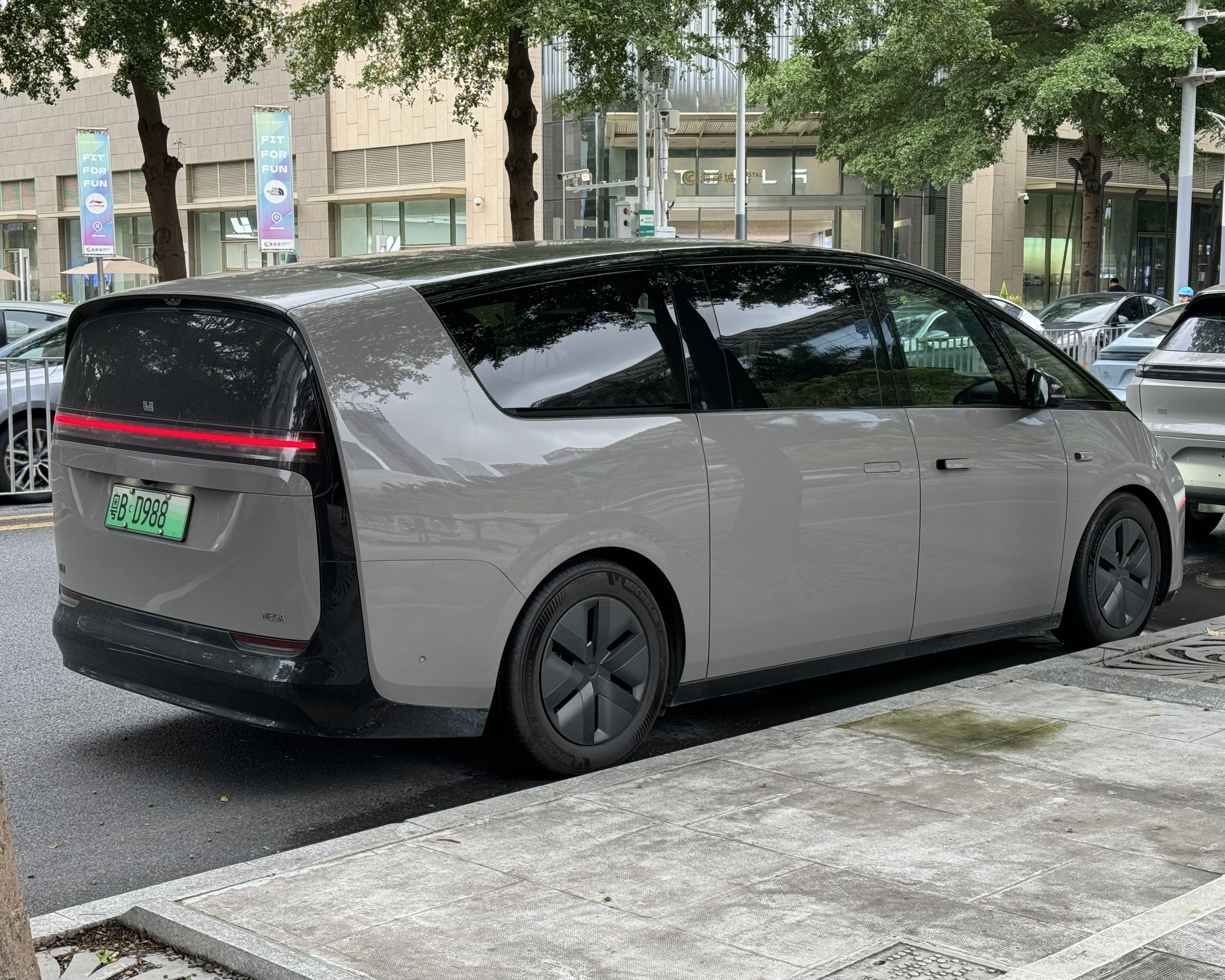
Rear view

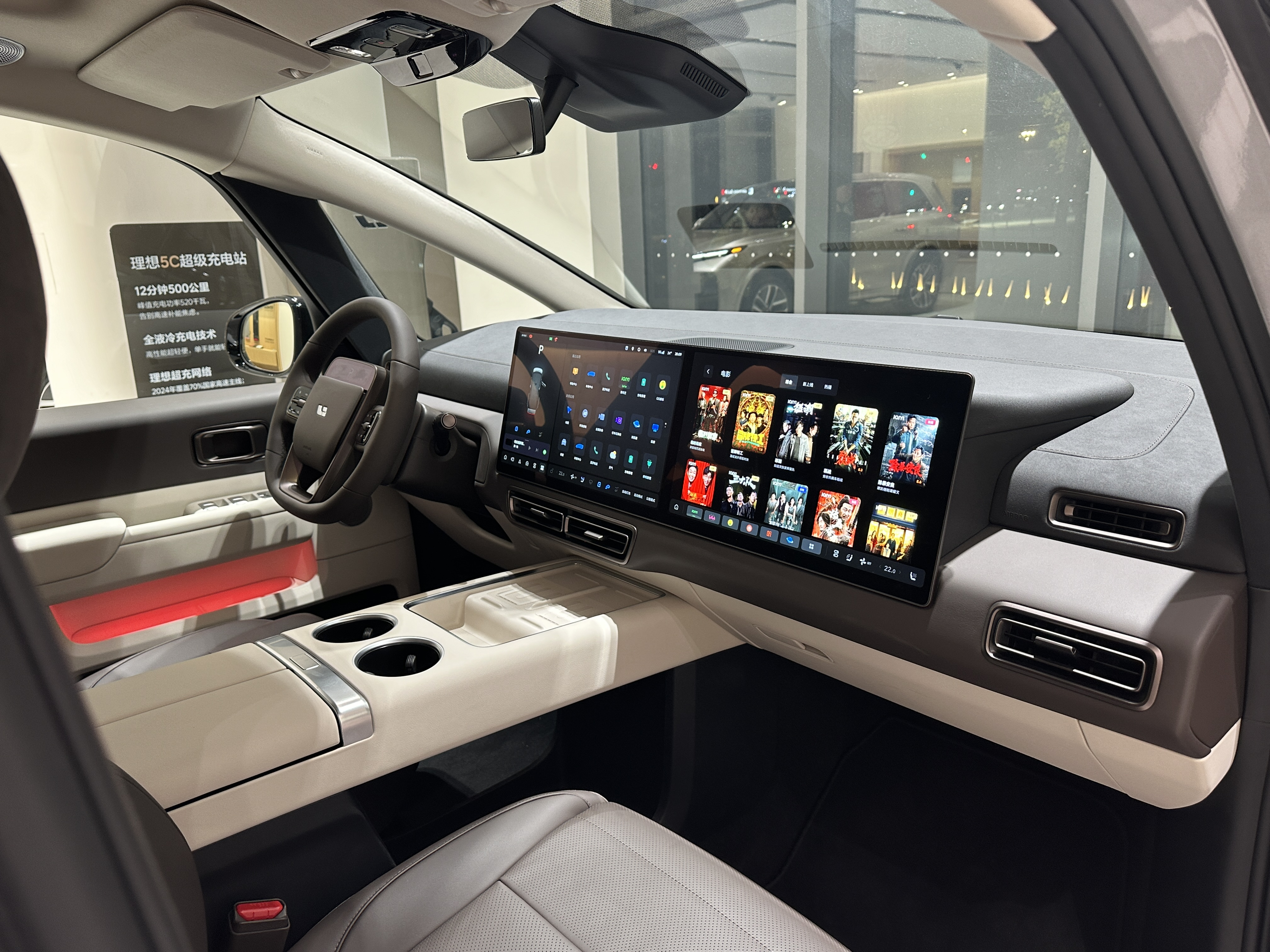
Interior

=== 2025 update ===
At Auto Shanghai 2025 in April, Li Auto revealed the 2025 updates to the Mega and the addition of the Home variant. Production started on 20 May 2025, with deliveries beginning on 23 May. The supervised autonomous driving system has been updated with new hardware and software. It uses a new ATL LiDAR, which is 60% smaller for lower drag and has 55% lower power consumption. It also uses a single Nvidia Thor-U chip capable of 700 TOPS, which is capable of running Li Auto's new MindVLA software architecture. The front doors now have a soft-close function, and the front passenger seat gains additional seat adjustments including a recline function and leg support. The rear entertainment display has been upgraded to a 3K 21.4-inch LCD screen.

The new Home trim is positioned higher than the original Ultra trim, and features several upgrades mostly to the interior. The second-row seats are the biggest change, and can now swivel up to 180-degrees to face rearward in a conversation mode with support for a round table accessory, and automatically turn 45 degrees when the doors open to aid entry, or 90 degrees to face out the doorway. The seats feature full heating, air ventilation and suction, 'zero-gravity' reclining, and 18-point massage functions. It also has power closing front doors. Li Auto is offering a paid seat upgrade package to owners of older models to install the new design.

=== 2026 (facelift) ===
A facelifted version of the Mega was unveiled on 2 September 2026. Although it is marketed as a new generation, it shares the majority of its components and almost identical dimensions with its predecessor. Changes on the exterior include slightly restyled front and rear fascias with lowered taillights, semi-hidden mechanical door handles that replace the previously hidden handles, "crystal brilliance" decorative trim and a tricolor front light bar known as the "Star Ring".

The interior has been redesigned to resemble Li Auto's latest models such as the second-generation L9. Both the first and second-row seats feature zero-gravity modes and an 18-point hot stone massage, while the second-row can rotates 180 degrees to face the rear. In that setup, a table can be mounted in various configurations. Third row seats are now equipped with heating and ventilation. A new ceiling light composed of 396 LEDs is known as the Home Light, which runs from the second row to the third row and splits the sunroof into two portions with individual shades. The side and rear windows can be dimmed electrochromically or through a physical shade. The interior is also equipped with 31 heating zones, a movable roof-mounted 21-inch 4K OLED display in the rear, a 10 L (610 cu in) heated or refrigerated compartment, and a 33-speaker sound system. A continuous 29-inch 6K OLED display, powered by the Qualcomm Snapdragon 8797 chip, is used in place of the previously separated central and passenger displays.

The facelift also adds an 800-volt active anti-roll system, dual-chamber air springs, dual-valve CDC dampers, steer-by-wire and rear wheel steering of up to 7 degrees in either direction. Its turning radius is reduced to 5.5 m (18 ft). A new "Elephant Welcome" feature drops one side of the vehicle by 30 mm (1.2 in) in 2 seconds to facilitate easier entry and exit. Four in-house LiDAR developed sensors and two Mach M100 chips used for driver-assistance features deliver a combined computing power of 2560 TOPS.

The facelifted Mega is launched exclusively in the flagship Home trim.

Li Mega 2026 (facelift)

Rear view

== Powertrain ==
The Mega is powered by a single powertrain option, a dual motor all-wheel drive system powered exclusively by a battery, with an 800 V electrical architecture. It consists of a 245 kW (329 hp; 333 PS) permanent magnet synchronous motor powering the rear wheels, supplemented by a 245 kW (329 hp; 333 PS) asynchronous induction motor powering the front axle, for a combined 536 hp (400 kW; 543 PS) and 542 N⋅m (400 lb⋅ft) of torque. The Mega can accelerate from 0–100 km/h (62 mph) in 5.5 seconds, and has a top speed of 180 km/h (112 mph).

The Mega uses a 102.7 kWh Qilin NMC battery pack supplied by CATL that supports 5C fast charging at a rated 400 kW and a peak of 520 kW, allowing for a 10-80% charging time of 10.5 minutes. It achieves a CLTC range rating of 710 kilometres (441 mi), or 575 kilometres (357 mi) on the WLTP cycle.

=== 2026 (facelift) ===
The facelifted Mega uses a single powertrain option – an upgraded dual motor all-wheel drive system that combines a 155 kW (208 hp; 211 PS) front motor and 258 kW (346 hp; 351 PS) rear motor to produce a total of 413 kW (554 hp; 562 PS) and 657 N⋅m (485 lb⋅ft) of torque. It can accelerate from 0–100 km/h (62 mph) in 4.9 seconds. Range and charging remain the same.

== Sales ==
Year	China
2024	10,798
2025	19,112
