= YKJ-1000 Hypersonic weapon =

Chinese air defense system

The Chinese-made YKJ-1000 hypersonic weapon is a private venture, low-cost (700,000Yuan/USD100,000) air defense system that is designed to be mass produced and affordable by Chinese municipalities along the eastern seaboard who may feel threatened by Japanese or allied forces, should they aggressively defend the independence of Taiwan. With a claimed range of around 500 miles, it could be capable of reaching most islands off the east coast of China and Japan a country that in 2025 elected a government perceived as hostile by some Chinese political commentators

== Background ==
The Beijing based company Lingkong Tianxing (Space Transportation) released a promotional video in Chinese of its Yukong YKJ-1000 missile via its own social media platform in late November 2025, claiming a speed of Mach 5, although according to Guancha assessment the propulsion is estimated at Mach 2 and the higher velocity probably occurs only during dives from high altitudes.

The company claims that it is an autonomous high-altitude, agile system capable of evading current tactical air-defense systems and that its successor will be equipped with artificial intelligence sufficiently advanced to penetrate the most sophisticated strategic systems.
