= Source Code Capital =

China-based venture capital firm

- Native name: 源码资本
- Company type: Private
- Industry: Venture Capital
- Founded: 2014; 12 years ago
- Founders: Yi Cao
- Headquarters: Beijing, China
- Products: Investments
- AUM: US$5.2 billion (2022)
- Website: sourcecodecap.com

Source Code Capital (Chinese: 源码资本; pinyin: Yuánmǎ Zīběn) is a Beijing-based venture capital firm founded in 2014. The firm invests in companies from various fields such as information technology, biotechnology, retail and manufacturing.

== Background ==
Source Code Capital was founded in 2014 by Yi Cao, a computer science graduate from Tsinghua University and a vice president at Sequoia Capital China.

Investors of the firm include pension funds, sovereign wealth funds, college endowments, charities and private equity firms.

The firm runs a peer and mentor alliance called "Code Class" each year, which consists of over 300 entrepreneurs and investors. Within the community, members can exchange experiences, resources and feedback to one another. Notable members of Code Class include Zhang Yiming of ByteDance and Wang Xing of Meituan.

The firm is noted to have invested in some of China's largest startups such as ByteDance, Meituan, Li Auto and Niu Technologies.

In July 2023, Source Code Capital shut down Source Code Yisu, a seed funding programme. It was speculated this was due to factors such as regulatory scrutiny, declining China–United States relations and slowing economic growth.

== Funds ==
Fund	Vintage Year	Committed Capital ($m)	TVPI by 2022	DPI by 2022
Source Code Fund I	2014	USD 100	8.4	1.17
Source Code Fund II	2015	USD 150	3.3	0.5
Source Code Fund III	2017	USD 260	1.5	0.05
Source Code Venture Fund IV & Source Code Growth Fund I	2019	USD 570	2.1	0
Source Code Venture Fund V & Source Code Growth Fund II	2021	USD 1,000	1.2	0

== Notable investments ==
- ByteDance
- Guazi.com
- Meituan
- Li Auto
- Niu Technologies
