= Li i8 =

Battery electric full-size luxury SUV

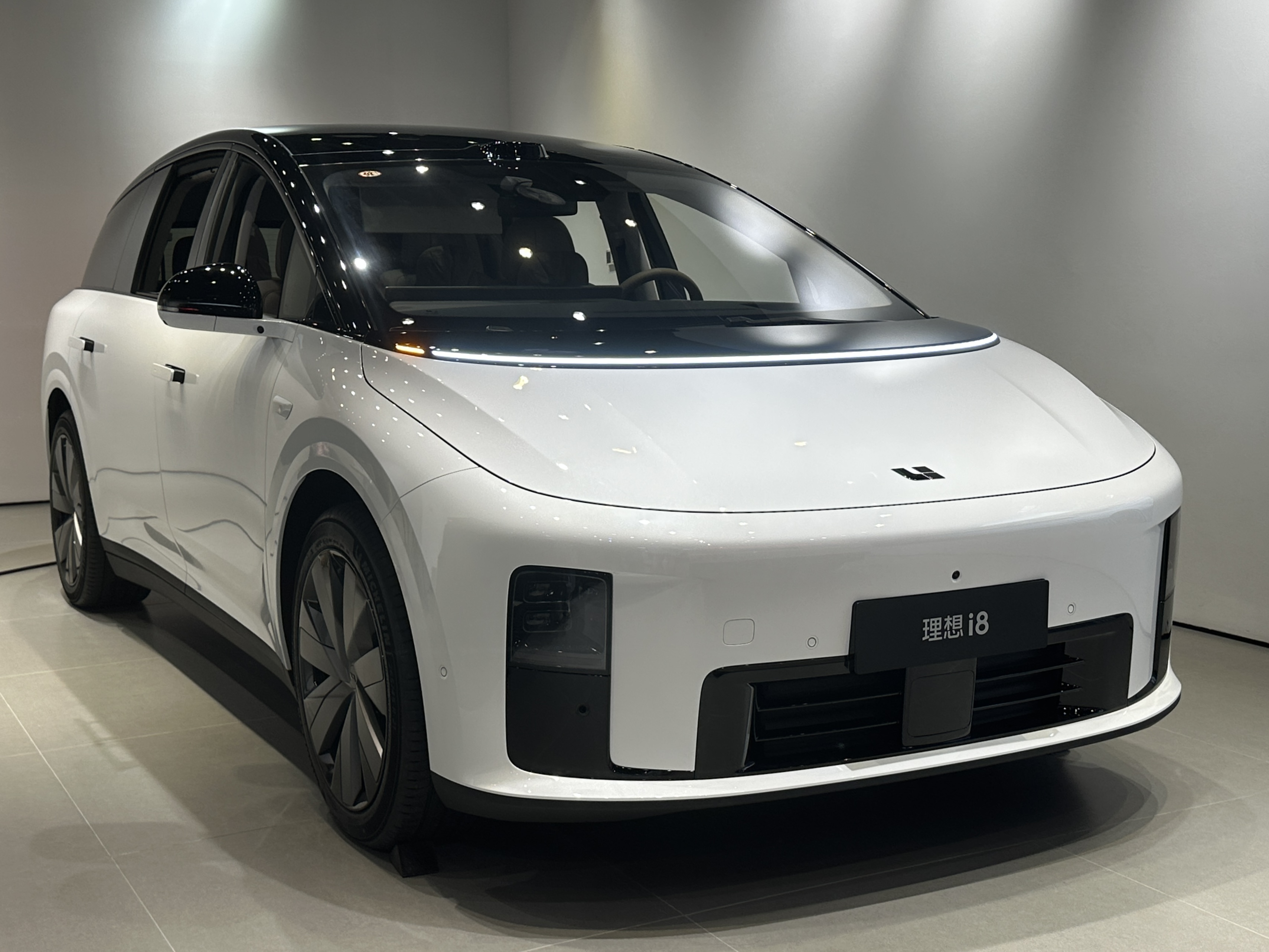

Overview
- Manufacturer: Li Auto
- Also called: Lixiang i8
- Production: 2025–present
- Assembly: China: Changzhou, Jiangsu
- Designer: Ben Baum

Body and chassis
- Class: Full-size luxury SUV
- Body style: 5-door SUV
- Layout: Dual-motor, all-wheel-drive
- Related: Li i6; Li i9; Li Mega

Powertrain
- Electric motor: 150 kW YS210XY103 induction; 250 kW TZ220XYHP1 permanent magnet synchronous
- Power output: 536 hp (400 kW; 543 PS)
- Battery: 90.05 kWh NMC CATL/Sunwoda; 97.84 kWh NMC CATL
- Electric range: 670–720 km (420–450 mi) (CLTC)
- Plug-in charging: 5C (DC)

Dimensions
- Wheelbase: 3,050 mm (120 in)
- Length: 5,085 mm (200.2 in)
- Width: 1,960 mm (77 in)
- Height: 1,740 mm (69 in)
- Curb weight: 1,655 kg (3,649 lb)

The Li i8 (Chinese: 理想i8; pinyin: Lǐxiǎng i8; lit. 'ideal i8') is a battery electric luxury full-size SUV produced by Chinese manufacturer Li Auto. It is the brand's second fully electric vehicle after the Mega. It is positioned as the flagship vehicle of the brand's i-series of battery electric product line.

== Background ==
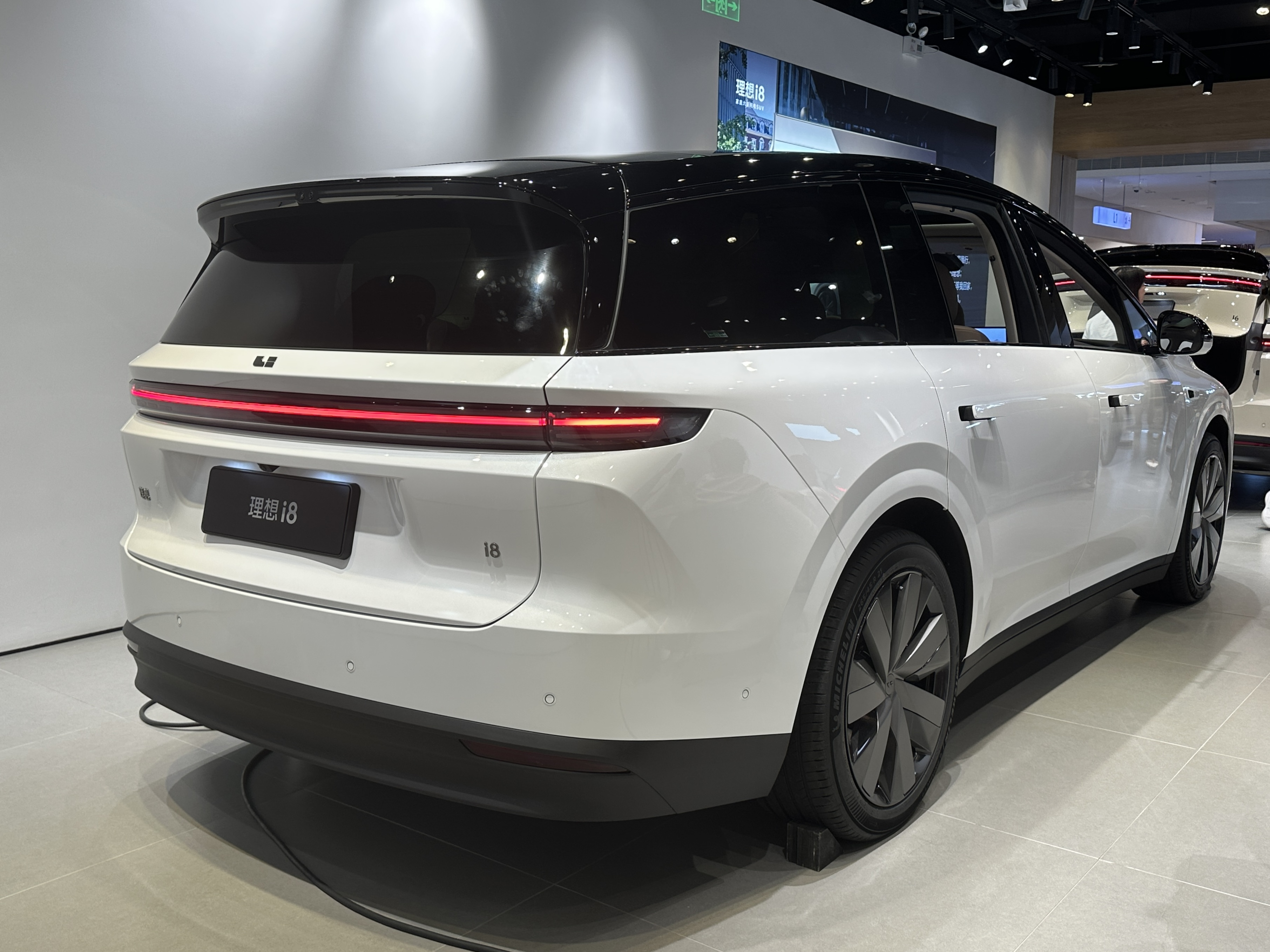
Rear view

The i8 first began development in 2021, with the design philosophy of maximizing interior space within compact interior dimensions to minimize drag. Li Auto executive Zhang Xiao said "Every seat, from first to third row, must be spacious". To achieve this, Li Auto decided to sacrifice the frunk and shorten the L113 (dash-to-axle; the distance from the front wheel axle to the front passenger footwell) to increase the available space in the cabin. The second priority was to reach a low drag coefficient near the Mega's 0.215 C_{d}, which was achieved by using a sloping rear roofline from the B-pillar onwards along with details such as covered front wipers and flush side windows, resulting in a drag coefficient of 0.218 C_{d}.

The i8 was originally heavily modeled the Mega and planned to be launched in mid-2024, a few months after the Mega, but was delayed by a year after the Mega's poor sales and severe negative feedback to its styling. The i8 was also originally planned to be named 'M8' to place it underneath the flagship Mega in the brand's new BEV product lineup, but was renamed to i8 to disassociate it from the Mega and create a separate BEV line. As a result these changes, the i8 was restyled in July 2024, a project which cost roughly $2.8 billion USD (20 billion CNY) due to the scrapping of existing tooling. During this time, changes were also made to the interior and suspension tuning to further differentiate it from the L9, with the addition of features such as driver's headrest speakers, adjustable headrests, second-row tray tables, and more prominent seat bolsters. Additionally, a late revert occurred in May 2025 from dual-valve dampers back to single-valve for their better vibration isolation at the expense of handling.

The i8 was first teased by Li Auto with a February 24, 2025 Weibo post by CEO Li Xiang introducing the vehicle as the brand's first SUV, along with two exterior images of the vehicle next to an L9 and Mega. Li added that the 'i' in the i8's model name stands for intelligence. The following day, Li Auto released additional images of the i8 next to a Tesla Model X.

The model's reveal date was brought forward from February 27 to avoid conflicting with the launch event of the Xiaomi 15 Ultra and Xiaomi SU7 Ultra after communication from Xiaomi CEO Lei Jun, which Li thanked him for in a Weibo post. On 16 April 2025, Li Auto revealed more pictures and details of the vehicle.

On 9 July, Li Auto announced that the i8 will be launched on 29 July 2025, with pre-sales opening on 17 July. CEO Li Xiang said that the i8's MPV-like profile caused a lot of internal discussion, but the company decided to go with the design for its better space utilization and passenger comfort, lower air drag leading to increased range, and better crash safety compared to a conventional boxy SUV design.

On 5 August 2025 one week after its launch on 29 July, Li Auto 'relaunched' the i8 by reducing the 3 original trims (Pro, Max, Ultra) down to a single variant combined with a price reduction. This was after poor sales due to configuration issues, marketing controversies, and several strong competitors launching competing models around the same time. Li Auto CEO Li Xiang said the i8 received over 30,000 refundable reservations, but only around 6,000 customers placed firm orders in the week following its launch according to an external consumer research agency. Li Auto said the base Pro trim only accounted for 2% of reservations, and 89% of buyers opted for the rear entertainment screen.

Configuration issues included features such as the in-console refrigerator, a trend that Li Auto had originally pioneered and was widely copied by competitors, not coming standard on the Pro trim despite it being standard equipment on significantly cheaper variants of the Li L6. Additionally, critics noted the Max trim lacked the option for a second row entertainment screen expected in the segment, with buyers forced to choose the Ultra trim for the feature. Major competitors which launched alongside the i8 include the Onvo L90 which heavily undercut it in price with similar features, and the BEV version of the successful Aito M8 which offers Huawei ecosystem integration. Additionally, a promotional video of a head-on crash between the i8 and a heavy truck intended to showcase the i8's crash safety backfired, with netizens doubting the validity of the results and eventually causing a negative social media trend against Li Auto owners.

== Overview ==
The exterior design of the i8 is a mix between Li Auto's L-series SUVs and Mega MPV. The front-end is similar to the Mega, with a high-mounted LED light bar acting as DRLs, and a forward-slanted hood flowing into a steeply raked windshield. It is available with a selection of 20 and 21-inch wheels which all have aerodynamic covers. The rear end closely resembles the L9 in design, but with a sloping roofline shape similar to the Mega. The i8 has a black-painted roof and pillars with a roof-mounted solid-state ATL LiDAR sensor and pop-out door handles. The i8 is equipped with air suspension, and has an approach and departure angle of 16 and 17 degrees, respectively.

The i8 is a three-row six-seater vehicle in a 2+2+2 configuration. The interior features dual 2.5K 15.7-inch dashboard-mounted screens serving as the infotainment display and passenger entertainment display, with a small touchscreen mounted on the steering wheel hub serving as the instrument cluster in conjunction with a head-up display. The second row seats have 14-way power adjustment and 8-point massage, while the center console contains a temperature controlled compartment capable of maintaining temperatures between 5–50 °C (41–122 °F).

== Powertrain ==
The i8 will be the first to utilize Li Auto's new self-developed 800V SiC power electronics module, allowing the vehicle to achieve 5C DC charging. It has the option of two NMC battery packs, the first supplied by CATL and Sunwoda with a capacity of 90.052 kWh, and a larger 97.842 kWh pack supplied by CATL, which weigh 545 and 564 kg (1,202 and 1,243 lb) respectively, and provide CLTC range ratings of 670 km (416 mi) and 720 km (447 mi), respectively. The smaller 90 kWh battery was no longer offered after the i8's relaunch in early August 2025 and did not reach production. On a 5C capable charger, it can recharge 500 km (310 mi) of range within 10 minutes, achieving 10–80% charge time of 11 minutes with a peak rate of 470 kW. It has a dual-motor all-wheel drive configuration, with a 150 kW (201 hp; 204 PS) induction motor powering the front wheels, and a 250 kW (335 hp; 340 PS) permanent magnet motor at the rear, for a total of 536 hp (400 kW; 543 PS), allowing for a top speed of 180 km/h (112 mph).

A lower-cost rear-wheel drive variant was added in August 2026. It uses a single motor outputting 335 hp (250 kW; 340 PS) to the rear wheels, and uses the same 97.8 kWh battery for a CLTC range rating of 780 km (485 mi). Additionally, the top speed of all versions was increased to 200 km/h (124 mph).

Model	Year	Battery		Power	Torque	Range	0–100 km/h (62 mph)	Kerb weight
Model	Year	Type	Weight	Power	Torque	CLTC	0–100 km/h (62 mph)	Kerb weight
Standard range AWD	2025 (cancelled)	90.052 kWh NMC Sunwoda	545 kg (1,202 lb)	536 hp (400 kW; 543 PS)	660 N⋅m (487 lb⋅ft)	670 km (416 mi)	4.5 sec	2,580 kg (5,688 lb)
Long range AWD	2025–present	97.842 kWh NMC CATL	564 kg (1,243 lb)	536 hp (400 kW; 543 PS)	660 N⋅m (487 lb⋅ft)	720 km (447 mi)	4.5 sec	2,610 kg (5,754 lb)
Long range RWD	2026–present	97.842 kWh NMC CATL	564 kg (1,243 lb)	335 hp (250 kW; 340 PS)	425 N⋅m (313 lb⋅ft)	780 km (485 mi)	6.6 sec	2,505 kg (5,523 lb)

== Controversy ==
On 29 July 2025, at the launch event for the Li i8, the i8 collided head-on with a Chenglong truck weighing approximately 8 tons (both vehicles traveling at 50 km/h). The i8's A-pillars, B-pillars, C-pillars, and door beams showed no deformation, the battery pack showed no leakage or fire, and the doors unlocked automatically. The Chenglong truck's cab tilted, and its wheels bounced off the cargo box.

On 31 July, Li Auto stated that the crash test aimed to verify the passive safety performance of the Li i8, simulating real-world traffic scenarios, and was fully entrusted to the third-party testing agency, China Automotive Technology and Research Center (CATARC). The Chenglong truck used in the test was a randomly purchased second-hand truck from the market, with CATARC providing the venue, equipment, and vehicle; Li Auto did not specify the brand. On the evening of 3 August, Li Auto's official Weibo account released a statement regarding the safety crash test of the Li i8. The statement explained that the test was solely for verifying and improving the passive safety performance of the Li i8, and was not an evaluation of the quality of other brands' products. The test results should not be interpreted as a judgment on the quality of other vehicles. It also specifically pointed out that the Dongfeng Liuzhou Chenglong brand used truck in the test was only used as a mobile barrier and was not intended to provide any guiding evaluation of its quality. Regarding the unexpected involvement of the Chenglong truck in the public opinion controversy, Li Auto stated that it was "completely unintentional."

== Sales ==
Year	China
2025	24,079
