= Li i9 =

Battery electric full-size luxury SUV

Overview
- Manufacturer: Li Auto
- Also called: Lixiang i9
- Production: 2026–present
- Assembly: China: Changzhou, Jiangsu
- Designer: Ben Baum

Body and chassis
- Class: Full-size luxury SUV
- Body style: 5-door SUV
- Layout: Dual-motor, all-wheel-drive
- Related: Li i6; Li i8; Li Mega

Dimensions
- Wheelbase: 3,168 mm (124.7 in)
- Length: 5,225 mm (205.7 in)
- Width: 1,970 mm (78 in)
- Height: 1,752 mm (69.0 in)
- Curb weight: 3,168 kg (6,984 lb)

The Li i9 (Chinese: 理想i9; pinyin: Lǐxiǎng i9; lit. 'ideal i9') is a battery electric luxury full-size SUV produced by Chinese manufacturer Li Auto. It is the largest vehicle in Li Auto's "i" series and sits alongside the extended-range L9 as Li Auto's flagship SUVs.

== Overview ==
The i9 was revealed through social media on 9 July, 2026. It was also shown to carry a "Home" badge, making it the second Li Auto model after the Mega MPV to have this version. It was later officially launched on 16 September 2026.

Rear view

Interior

The i9 features similar design elements to the rest of the Li Auto lineup, particularly the smaller i-series vehicles, such as the i6 and i8. This includes the "Star Ring" headlights and the nearly one-box, tapered profile. Its drag coefficient is 0.215 Cd, making it the most aerodynamic mass-production SUV. The interior is exclusively available in a six-seat configuration, featuring multiple three-color schemes. The first two rows of seats all have zero-gravity functions, while the second row seats can individual rotate 180 degrees to face the third row, similar to the larger Mega. A table can be also mounted between the second and third rows when in that configuration. In addition, it also features a 10 L (610 cu in) heated and refrigerated compartment and a 29-speaker 4960 W audio system. The i9 features a continuous 29-inch 6K display in the front, integrating central and passenger display functions, as well as a roof-mounted 21-inch entertainment display in the rear.
