= RoboSense =

Chinese lidar company

RoboSense Technology Co., Ltd
- Native name: 速腾聚创科技有限公司
- Type: Public
- Traded as: SEHK: 2498
- Industry: Lidar
- Founded: August 2014; 12 years ago
- Founders: Qiu Chunxin; Zhu Xiaorui; Liu Letian
- Headquarters: Shenzhen, Guangdong, China
- Key people: Qiu Chunxin (Chairman); Qiu Chunchao (CEO)
- Revenue: ▲CN¥1.12 billion (2023)
- Net income: ▼CN¥−4.33 billion (2023)
- Total assets: ▼CN¥3.27 billion (2023)
- Total equity: ▼CN¥−9.07 billion (2023)
- Number of employees: 1,324 (2023)
- Website: www.robosense.ai

RoboSense Technology Co., Ltd (RoboSense; Chinese: 速腾聚创; pinyin: Sùténg Jùchuàng) is a publicly listed Chinese technology company that engages in the development and sales of lidar products such as sensors. Its products are used mainly in the ADAS, vehicular automation, robotics and industrial sectors.

== History ==
After finishing his PhD on outdoor robotics perception at the Harbin Institute of Technology, Qiu Chunxin founded RoboSense in 2014. Qiu asked his PhD supervisor Zhu Xiaorui and PhD peer Liu Letian to join his team as chief scientist and chief technology officer respectively.

Investors of RoboSense have included over 30 institutional investors such as Cainiao, BYD and Xiaomi.

RoboSense started out making scanners for the construction and interior design industries, releasing its first static 3D laser scanner in 2015.

With the rise of Tesla, Inc. and autonomous driving, RoboSense soon switched its focus to vehicle sensors. In 2016, RoboSense launched its automotive-grade lidars and became one of the first mass producers of solid-state lidars where the sensors are fixed rather than rotating. RoboSense has also made progress in the MEMS lidar field for driver assistance functions.

RoboSense also expanded into developing lidar hardware for other industries including robotics and AI-based detection software.

On 5 January 2024, RoboSense held its initial public offering (IPO) becoming a listed company on the Hong Kong Stock Exchange. The offering raised HK$990 million and with a valuation of HK$19.3 billion, RoboSense was the world's highest valued lidar company at the time. On its trading debut, its shares dropped 2.09% in the morning. Investors questioned whether costly lidar sensor technology would be widely adopted by makers of self-driving cars.

In early 2024, it was reported that RoboSense was the world's biggest supplier of automotive lidars.

RoboSense was present at CES 2025 to demonstrate its products to the US market. Qiu who was at the event stated that product quality was more important than geopolitical tensions.

RoboSense has been compared to Hesai Technology and is considered its main rival in China. In October 2025, the United States Department of Defense stated that RoboSense merits inclusion on a list of companies linked to China's military. In June 2026, the US Department of Defense added the company to a list of Chinese military-linked companies.

== See also ==
- Hesai Technology
