= Hesai Technology =

Chinese lidar company

Hesai Group
- Native name: 上海禾赛科技股份有限公司
- Company type: Public
- Traded as: Nasdaq: HSAI; SEHK: 2525
- Industry: Lidar
- Founded: October 2014; 11 years ago
- Founders: Li Yifan; Sun Kai; Xiang Shaoqing
- Headquarters: Shanghai, China
- Key people: Li Yifan (CEO)
- Revenue: ▲US$264.37 million (2023)
- Net income: ▲US$−67.04 million (2023)
- Total assets: ▲US$797.56 million (2023)
- Total equity: ▲US$544 million (2023)
- Number of employees: 1,122 (2023)
- Website: www.hesaitech.com

Hesai Technology (Hesai; Chinese: 禾赛科技; pinyin: Hésài Kējì) is a publicly listed Chinese technology company that engages in the development and sales of lidar products such as sensors. Its products are used mainly in the ADAS, vehicular automation, robotics and industrial sectors.

== History ==
When Hesai was founded, lidar products were entering a period of growth especially when American companies were launching robotaxis. At that time, a set of lidar products could cost up to US$80,000 however Hesai was able to sell them for US$40,000 which helped it to gain it market share.

Hesai has seen domestic success in China. Previously Baidu acquired light sensors from Velodyne Lidar for its robotaxis. However Velodyne did not have a warehouse in China and it took months to send parts back and forth to the US for repair. Hesai took advantage by being able to provide domestic after-sales service that could repair components within two days. As a result, in 2018, Baidu awarded Hesai a contract to be its supplier.

Hesai has also targeted self driving cars. In 2021 it launched its first generation lidar for self driving cars, and in 2022 it launched its second generation one. Li Auto became a customer of Hesai in 2021 and is its largest one. Other customers include Lotus Cars, Changan Automobile, SAIC Motor, and FAW Group, Nio and XPeng.

On February 9, 2023, Hesai held its initial public offering to become a listed company on the Nasdaq in the United States. It raised US$190 million making it the biggest Chinese listing since 2021 when DiDi listed. Hesai rose 11% on its trading debut. A US listing was chosen due to Hesai wanting more exposure on the global stage.

In May 2023, the Congressional Research Service produced a report accusing Hesai of supporting the Chinese military. In January 2024, the United States Department of Defense (DOD) added Hesai to the list of "Chinese military companies" operating in the U.S. In May 2024, Hesai sued the DOD asking it to remove Hesai from the list. It alleged the DOD's behavior was "arbitrary and capricious" because it did not provide the company with prior notice or an opportunity to respond. Hesai alleged the DOD failed to explain its rationale, provide evidence or review information submitted by Hesai. In August 2024, the DOD decided to remove Hesai from the list as it did not meet the legal criteria for inclusion. In October 2024, the DOD relisted Hesai based on new information. As a result, Hesai continued its lawsuit against the DOD.

In 2023, Hesai held 73% of the market share for robotaxi lidar suppliers. Its customers include Cruise, Aurora Innovation, Apolong, DiDi and Pony.ai.

Hesai Technology has been compared to RoboSense and is considered its main rival in China.

According to Yole Group's report Automotive LiDAR 2025, Hesai leads the automotive LiDAR market with 33% market share (followed by RoboSense, Huawei, and Seyond), and the passenger vehicle market with 26% market share.

In July 2025, Hesai appealed a previous federal court ruling that upheld the DOD's designation of Hesai as a "Chinese military company". This came after Hesai raised US$192 million in its 2023 US IPO but was placed on a Pentagon list of firms linked to China's military in January 2024.

In September 2025, Hesai sought a secondary listing on the Hong Kong stock exchange aiming to raise $497 million. This comes after renewed US delisting risks.

In November 2025, Hesai announced that it is building a factory in Bangkok Thailand to support global demand. In January 2026, the company announced that they look to double their production capacity from 2 million units to 4 million units in 2026.

== See also ==
- RoboSense
