= Li Auto =

Chinese car company

Li Auto Inc.

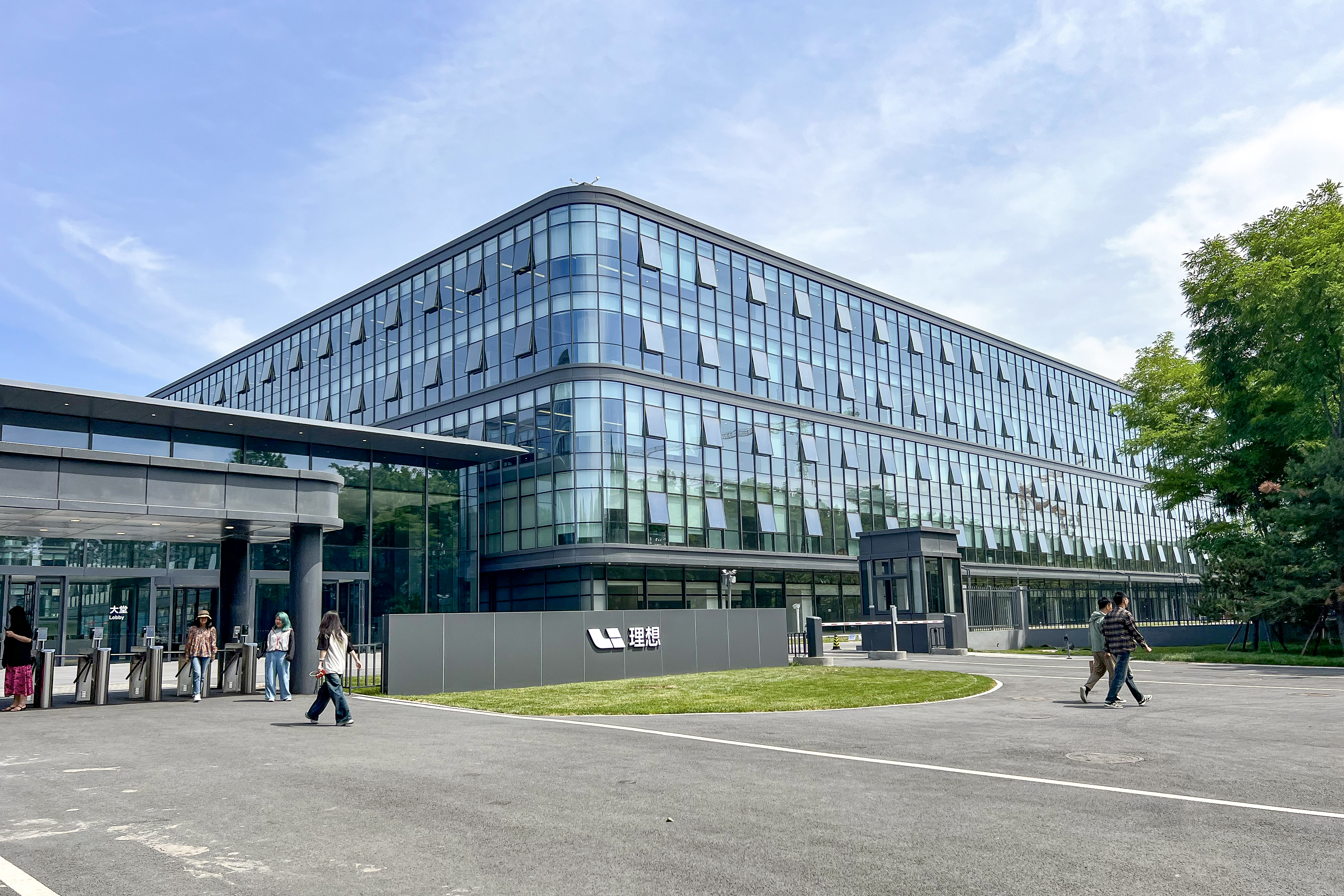
- Li Auto R&D base in Gaoliying, Beijing
- Formerly: Chehejia / CHJ Auto
- Type: Public
- Traded as: Nasdaq: LI; SEHK: 2015
- Industry: Automotive
- Founded: 2015; 11 years ago
- Founder: Li Xiang
- Headquarters: Beijing, China
- Key people: Li Xiang (chairman and CEO); Donghui Ma (president & Executive Director); Tie Li (CFO)
- Products: Automobiles
- Production output: ▼406,343 vehicles (2025)
- Revenue: ▲CN¥ 144.46 billion (2024)
- Operating income: ▼CN¥ 7.02 billion (2024)
- Net income: ▼CN¥ 8.04 billion (2024)
- Total assets: ▲CN¥ 126.3 billion (2024)
- Total equity: ▲CN¥ 162.3 billion (2024)
- Number of employees: 32,248 (2024)
- Subsidiaries: Beijing Co Wheels Technology Co., Ltd; Changzhou Chehejin Standard Factory Construction Co., Ltd

Chinese name
- Simplified Chinese: 北京理想汽车有限公司
- Hanyu Pinyin: Běijīng Lǐxiǎng Qìchē Yǒuxiàn Gōngsī

Business name
- Simplified Chinese: 理想汽车
- Hanyu Pinyin: Lǐxiǎng Qìchē
- Website: liauto.com

Li Auto Inc. (Chinese: 理想汽车; pinyin: Lǐxiǎng Qìchē; lit. 'ideal automobiles') is a Chinese electric vehicle manufacturer headquartered in Beijing, with manufacturing facilities in Changzhou. Founded by Li Xiang (Chinese: 李想; pinyin: Lǐ Xiǎng) in 2015, the company is best known for producing electric vehicles equipped with range extender petrol engines.

Li Auto has vehicle manufacturing, engineering, and design services located in Changzhou, Jiangsu with corporate headquarters and research and development located in Beijing.

== History ==
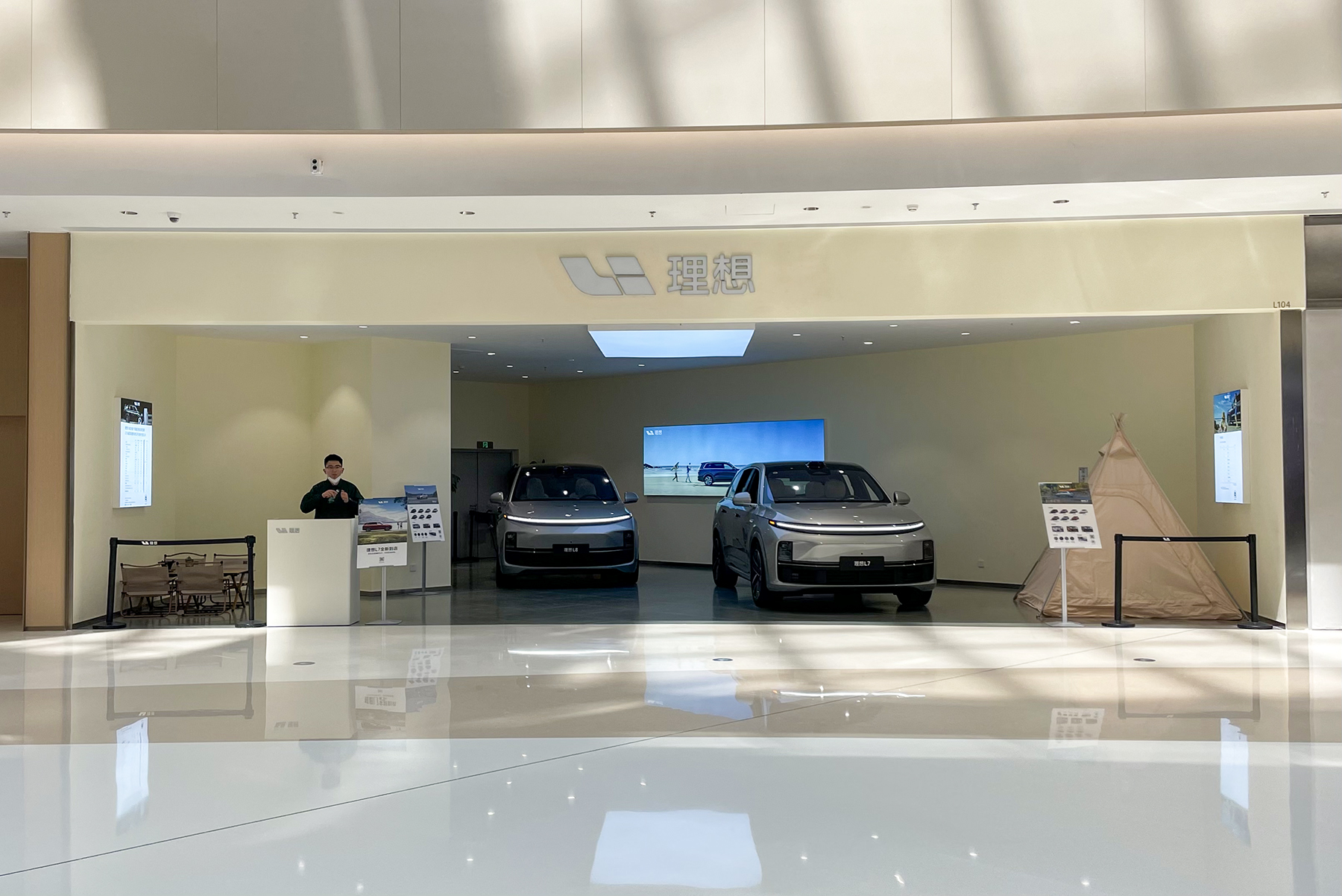
A Li Auto showroom in Zhengzhou, Henan

In 2015, Li Xiang, founder of Chinese website PCPop and automotive website Autohome.com.cn, created a company called Beijing Chehejia Information Technology (Chehejia translates as "Car and Home"). It started its operations by developing and producing low-speed EVs that targeted car-sharing and ride-hailing services. In 2018, Chehejia reached an agreement for a joint venture with DiDi, China's largest ride-hailing service company, but the plan collapsed shortly afterward. In the first half of 2018, Chehejia abandoned the low-speed EV project due to the lack of support from the Chinese central government for legalizing the EV category.

In 2019, the holding company Chehejia Technologies, based in the Cayman Islands, rebranded itself as Leading Ideal Inc. The following year, it shortened the name to Li Auto, and the company was renamed Li Auto Inc. In Chinese, the brand is commonly known as Lixiang (理想).

Li Auto unveiled its first model named the Li One in April 2019, with production beginning in November of the same year. It is a range-extended electric SUV powered by a combination of a 1.2-litre three-cylinder turbocharged engine, and a 40 kWh lithium-ion battery. Production was done at its Changzhou factory, with deliveries of the vehicle commencing in early 2020.

In July 2020, Li Auto made its debut on the Nasdaq stock market under the stock code "LI," raising US$1.1 billion in its initial round of financing. Investors of the company include Meituan and Source Code Capital. Despite strong sales and significant popularity in the Chinese market, the company encountered difficulties in securing sufficient investment during its first year on the stock exchange, closing at only 70% of the anticipated value for its initial financing round.

In October 2021, Li Auto started the construction of its second plant in Shunyi District in Beijing. This site was previously owned by Beijing Hyundai but was sold to Li Auto due to a prolonged decline in Beijing Hyundai's sales.

In 2022, Li Auto underwent a comprehensive portfolio overhaul, introducing a new design language and expanding its model lineup from the existing Li One SUV to include three entirely new models. The flagship Li L9 made its debut in March, followed by the L8, a shortened variant, and the L7, a smaller version without a third row of seats, presented in September. During the same month, Li Auto made the decision to cease production of the Li One in October 2022, which generated a negative reaction from recent buyers of the SUV.

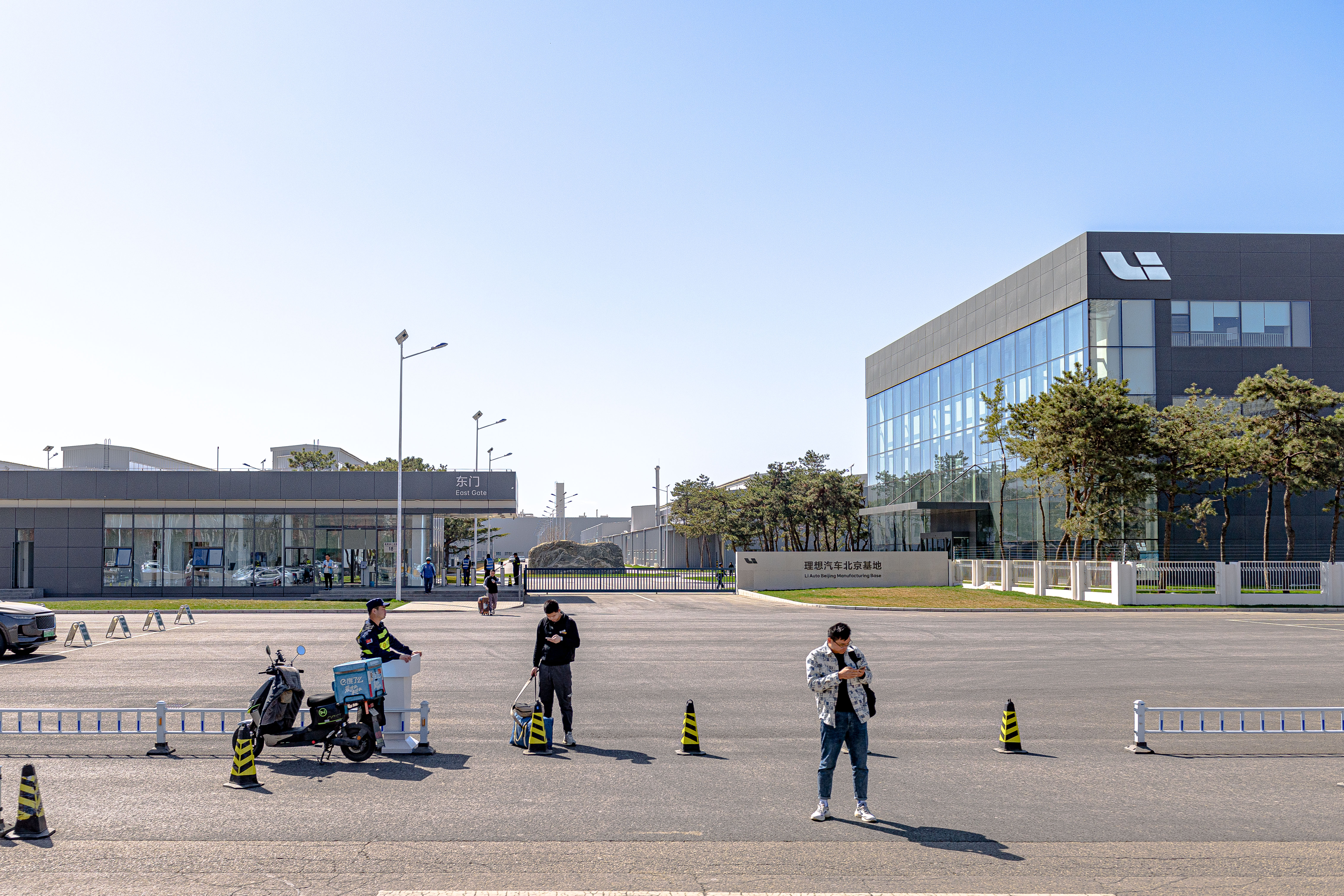
Li Auto Beijing manufacturing base in Shiyuan, Shunyi District, Beijing

In November 2023, Li Auto presented its fourth model, Li Mega, a full-size flagship MPV. It is the first battery electric car produced by the company.

In 2025, Li Auto introduced the i Series, a new lineup of fully electric vehicles inspired by the design of the Li Mega. The first model, the Li i8, was launched in February 2025, followed by the Li i6 in September.

At an earnings call in May 2025, CEO Li Xiang said that Li Auto would consider launching sedan models after maximizing revenue from their existing lineup, which consisted of the L-series range-extender SUVs and MEGA MPV at the time. Sedan models would be considered based on market demand from future overseas markets in Europe and Asia.

== Models ==
=== Current vehicles ===
Image	Name(s)	Introduction (cal. year)	Generation	Vehicle description
SUV
	L6	2024	Second	Mid-size SUV, PHEV (EREV)
	L8	2022	Second	Mid-size SUV, PHEV (EREV)
	L9	2022	Second	Full-size SUV, PHEV (EREV)
	i6	2025	First	Mid-size SUV, BEV
	i8	2025	First	Full-size SUV, BEV
	i9	2026	First	Full-size SUV, BEV
MPV
	Mega	2024	First	Full-size MPV, BEV

=== Discontinued vehicles ===
Image	Name(s)	Introduction (cal. year)	Discontinued	Generation	Vehicle description
SUV
	L7	2023	2026	First	Mid-size SUV, PHEV (EREV)
	One	2019	2022	First	Mid-size SUV, PHEV (EREV)

== Controversy ==
In the spring of 2020, the media circulated reports of users having problems with their SUV, the Li Auto One. An owner reported problems with the operation of the braking system, and just a day after this information appeared, another driver of the Li Auto One complained about the smell of smoke in the passenger compartment. The manufacturer denied that the risk of these defects affected other versions of the hybrid SUV.

In July 2021, the Chinese social media Weibo circulated a video showing the discovery by one of the owners of a Li One of mercury balls, which as a substance for the production of cars is banned in China. Traces of the raw material were found in the armchair, and even more of them were found after it was removed. Li Auto representatives began an investigation immediately after the video was published, confirming its authenticity.

== Sales ==
Sales of Li Auto
Year	Sales (units)
2019	1,000
2020	33,457
2021	90,491
2022	133,246
2023	376,030
2024	500,508
2025	406,343

== See also ==
- List of automobile manufacturers of China
- Automotive industry in China
- Automobile manufacturers and brands of China
- New energy vehicles in China
- Nio Inc.
- XPeng
- Leapmotor
- Harmony Intelligent Mobility Alliance
- Xiaomi Auto
- BYD Auto
