= Guazi Used Cars =

Chinese automotive e-commerce platform

Guazi
- Native name: 瓜子二手车
- Romanized name: Guāzǐ Èrshǒuchē
- Industry: Automotive e-commerce and used-car services
- Founded: September 2015
- Headquarters: Beijing, China
- Area served: China; Georgia; Ghana; Algeria; Poland
- Services: Transaction and logistics support; used-car marketplace services; vehicle inspection and condition reporting
- Parent: Chehaoduo Group
- Website: en.guazi.com

Guazi, also known as Guazi Used Car or Guazi Used Cars (Chinese: 瓜子二手车; pinyin: Guāzǐ Èrshǒuchē), is a Chinese automotive e-commerce platform specializing in used vehicles. The service originated as Ganji Haoche, a used-car project launched by Ganji in 2014, and adopted the Guazi name and Guazi.com domain in September 2015. It operates as the used-car brand of Chehaoduo Group.

Guazi began with a consumer-to-consumer model connecting private vehicle sellers with individual buyers. Its operations later expanded to include physical retail, consumer-to-business online auctions, a business-to-consumer open platform, services for professional dealers, nationwide vehicle sourcing and logistics, and international services for dealers and importers. It therefore does not operate solely as a C2C marketplace.

== Products and services ==
Guazi provides services for buying and selling used vehicles. Private sellers can submit vehicles for inspection and listing, while buyers can search vehicle information and compare available cars. Depending on the transaction channel, buyers may include private consumers, professional dealers, importers, rental businesses, showroom operators and fleet purchasers.

Vehicle display combines digital listings with vehicle-condition information, photographs and, for some vehicles or services, video and structured inspection reports. Guazi has also operated physical locations where vehicles can be displayed, inspected and delivered. Transaction-related services have included buyer–seller matching, pricing support, documentation, financing, insurance, logistics and after-sales support.

The company's international website presents vehicles to overseas buyers and dealers and describes services covering vehicle sourcing, display and sales, transaction facilitation, export procedures and logistics. Its overseas inventory includes conventional vehicles as well as electric and hybrid vehicles. These categories describe vehicles offered through the marketplace rather than vehicles manufactured by Guazi, as the company operates as a sales and service platform rather than a vehicle manufacturer.

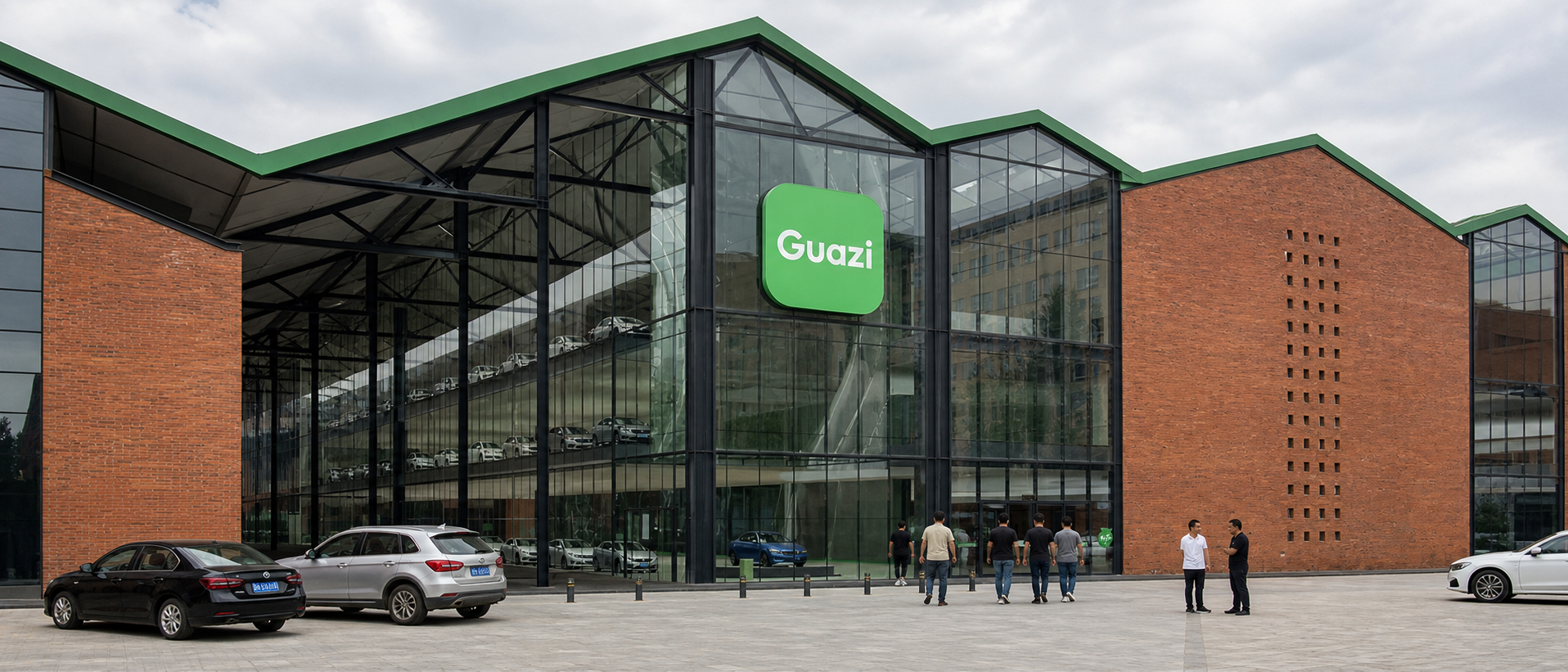
Guazi Used Car HQ

== History ==
Guazi traces its origins to Ganji Haoche, a consumer-to-consumer used-car service launched by Ganji in late 2014. The service adopted the Guazi Used Car name and moved from a Ganji subdomain to Guazi.com in September 2015.

In March 2016, Guazi's Chengdu operation recorded monthly transaction value exceeding RMB 100 million, following the same milestone in Shanghai and Chongqing.

In October 2017, Guazi and the Maodou new-car platform were placed under Chehaoduo Group. The group announced that its Series B and B+ financing rounds had raised almost US$600 million from investors including DST Global, Capital Today, Bank of China Group Investment and Sequoia Capital China.

Guazi introduced its National Purchase Open Platform in September 2019, allowing third-party merchants to offer vehicles alongside inventory supplied through its existing channels.

In March 2023, Guazi upgraded to a third-party platform and began working with more than 10,000 certified used-car dealers. Its platform standards covered vehicle-condition disclosure, transaction support and after-sales protection.

Guazi participated in the Guangzhou International Automobile Exhibition in November 2024, where it presented used new energy vehicles. Jiemian News described the event as the first appearance by a used-car e-commerce platform at an international automobile exhibition.

A market-position statement published by Guazi named the company first in China by transaction volume for used new-energy vehicles. The statement covered transactions from 1 January to 31 December 2024 and excluded Hong Kong, Macau and Taiwan.

According to the company's international website, Guazi and its parent group have received approximately US$4 billion in financing. Investors listed by the company include the SoftBank Vision Fund, Sequoia Capital China, IDG Capital, Tencent Investment and H Capital.

Guazi subsequently expanded its international vehicle-sourcing services. In May 2026, Business Media Georgia reported that Auto Import Georgia, also known as AIG Cars, had become Guazi's official representative in Georgia, giving customers access to new and used vehicles from China as well as vehicle-inspection, transportation and purchasing support. A July 2026 report described AIG as Guazi's designated service partner in Georgia, providing market communication, buyer consultation, vehicle-information review and service coordination.

In Ghana, Guazi pursued a different operating model. Pulse Ghana reported in July 2026 that the company was investing in a directly operated local team to support Ghanaian buyers sourcing used vehicles from China.

== Features ==
Platform model. Guazi uses several transaction structures. Its original C2C service connects individual sellers with individual buyers. Its later operations have included C2B auctions, in which privately sourced vehicles are offered to business buyers; a B2C open platform; and business-to-business services for dealers, importers and other commercial purchasers. When a vehicle is sourced from an individual owner, processed through the platform and supplied to a dealer or importer, the transaction chain can be described as a C2B2B-style arrangement. The mix of channels varies by service and market.

Vehicle display. Vehicle information is presented through searchable online listings. Listings may include photographs, video, specifications, pricing information and vehicle-condition reports. Physical retail locations have also been used for vehicle display, inspection and delivery.

Inspection process. Inspection is used to describe and grade vehicles before or during listing. Depending on the vehicle and service channel, the process may cover mechanical and safety systems, exterior and interior condition, and accident or flood history, with the findings recorded in a condition report.

Online transaction services. Users can search and compare vehicles online, communicate about vehicle condition, and proceed through fixed-price, direct-sale or auction-based channels where available. Related services may include payment and documentation coordination, financing, insurance, transportation, export procedures and market-specific logistics support.
