= Avatr T09 =

Range extended full-size SUV

Overview
- Manufacturer: Avatr Technology
- Production: 2026 (to commence)
- Assembly: China: Chongqing
- Designer: Nader Faghihzadeh

Body and chassis
- Class: Full-size SUV
- Body style: 5-door SUV
- Layout: Front-engine, dual or triple-motors, all-wheel-drive

Powertrain
- Engine: Petrol PHEV: 1.5 L JL469ZQ1 turbo I4; 2.0 L JL478ZQ1 turbo I4
- Electric motor: 180 kW AYDM05 induction (front); 310 kW XTDM81 PMSM (dual-motor, rear); 2×225 kW ATDM05 PMSM (tri-motor, rear)
- Power output: 645–845 hp (481–630 kW; 654–857 PS)
- Hybrid drivetrain: PHEV
- Battery: 71.24 kWh NMC CATL
- Electric range: 404 km (251 mi) (WLTP)

Dimensions
- Wheelbase: 3,150 mm (124 in)
- Length: 5,285 mm (208 in)
- Width: 2,025 mm (80 in)
- Height: 1,810–1,820 mm (71–72 in)
- Curb weight: 2,880–3,035 kg (6,349–6,691 lb)

The Avatr T09 (Chinese: 阿维塔T09; pinyin: Ā wéi tǎ T09) is an upcoming range extended full-size SUV produced by Avatr Technology, a joint venture between Changan Automobile and CATL. It is Avatr's largest vehicle and is positioned as its flagship SUV.

== Overview ==
The T09 was officially revealed by Avatr on 8 September 2026, before filings from the Ministry of Industry and Information Technology revealed additional information. It made its global debut as the Avatr Concept T09 at the Paris Motor Show on 13 October 2026, alongside the 06T and 07L.

According to Avatr, the T09 belongs to the new 'Flagship' series which differs in design and character compared to the brand's previous vehicles, which continue to expand under the 'Digital' series.

The T09's exterior design is a large departure from previous models in the 'Digital' series, with more angular elements and a more upright stance. Some design elements such as the body side were inspired by the Avatr Vision Xpectra concept. The front fascia features split headlights, while the front panel available in body color in default can be swapped for a chrome or black grille-like panel composed of small Avatr logos. The rear has a full-width light bar and a hidden rear wiper. Other features include semi-hidden door handles, a panoramic glass roof and multi-spoke wheels. Single or two-tone exterior color options are available.

Its interior features three displays housed within one integrated glass piece – a 10.25-inch instrument cluster, and 17.2-inch central and passenger displays. It also reintroduces the "Vortex" used similarly in the 11, a 360-degree, curved and retractable 'emotional interaction system' embedded with 118 RGB matrix LEDs.

The T09 is developed in collaboration with Huawei. It is built on the Huawei XMS Digital Chassis, featuring closed dual-chamber air suspension, rear wheel steering that lowers its turning radius down to around 4 m (13 ft) and allows for an intelligent crab walk mode. It is further equipped with Huawei's Qiankun ADS 5 autonomous driving systems.

== Powertrain ==
Two extended-range electric powertrains are available in either dual-motor or triple-motor configurators, both equipped with a 71.24–kWh NMC battery pack and reaching a top speed of 220 km/h (140 mph). It offers a battery electric range of up to 404 km (251 mi) on the WLTP cycle.

Battery		Engine		Power (electric motors)			Curb weight
Type	Weight	Model	Power	Front	Rear	Total	Curb weight
71.24 kWh NMC CATL	404 kg (891 lb)	1.5 L JL469ZQ1	105 kW (141 hp)	180 kW (241 hp)	310 kW (416 hp)	481 kW (645 hp)	2,880–2,968 kg (6,349–6,543 lb)
71.24 kWh NMC CATL	404 kg (891 lb)	2.0 L JL478ZQ1	150 kW (201 hp)	180 kW (241 hp)	2×225 kW (302 hp)	630 kW (845 hp)	3,035 kg (6,691 lb)
