= Avatr 12 =

Electric executive full-size sedan

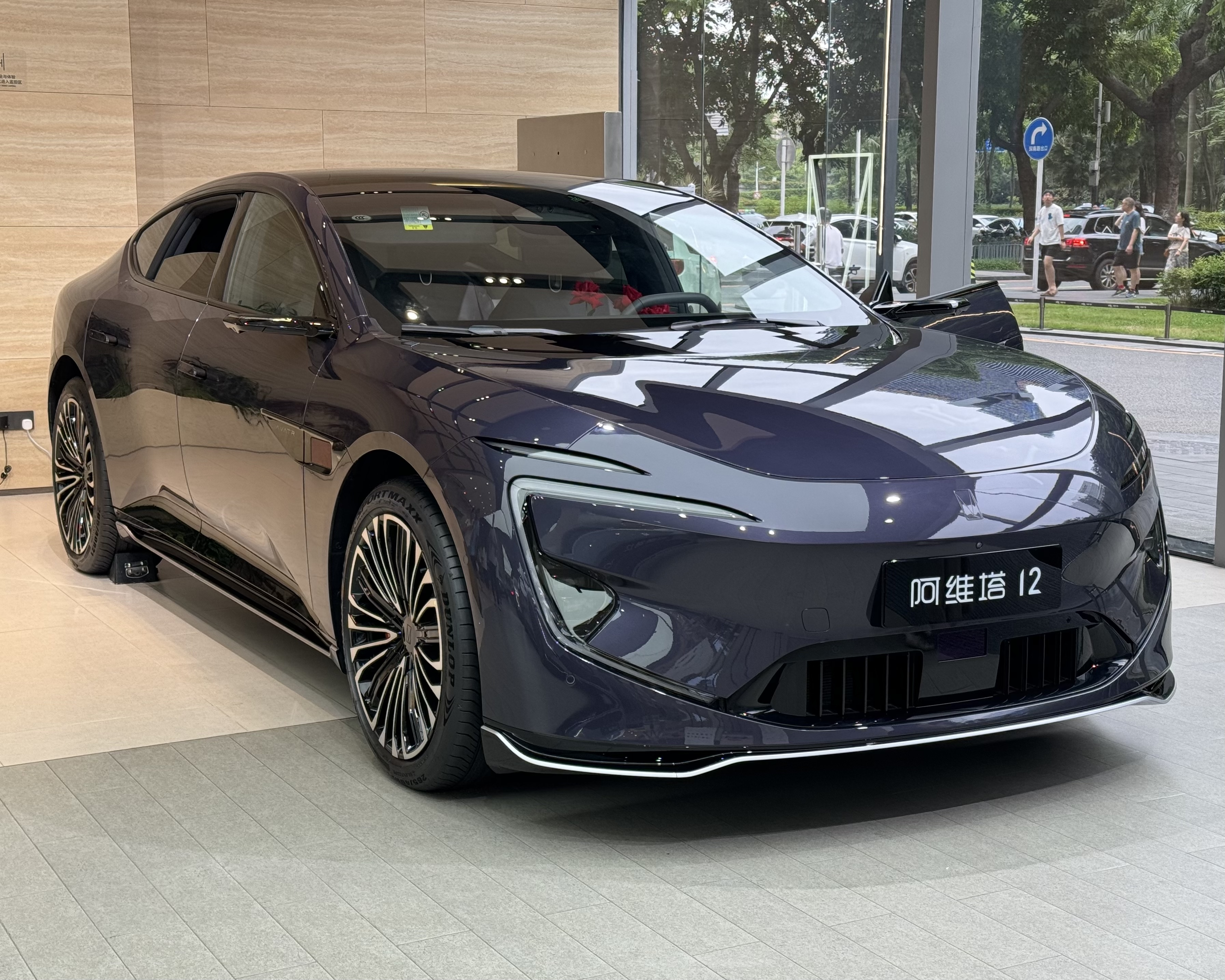

Overview
- Manufacturer: Avatr Technology
- Production: 2023–present
- Assembly: China: Chongqing
- Designer: Nader Faghihzadeh; Nicolas Guille; Benoit Cauet

Body and chassis
- Class: Executive car (E)
- Body style: 4-door sedan
- Layout: Rear-motor, rear-wheel drive; Dual-motor, all-wheel-drive
- Platform: CHN platform
- Related: Avatr 11

Powertrain
- Engine: Petrol range extender: 1.5 L JL469ZQ1 turbo I4
- Electric motor: Permanent magnet synchronous (rear), AC induction (front)
- Power output: 313–955 hp (233–712 kW)
- Transmission: 1-speed direct-drive
- Hybrid drivetrain: Range extender series plug-in hybrid (Kunlun EREV)
- Battery: 39.05 kWh LFP CATL; 52.01 kWh LFP CATL; 94.53 kWh NMC CATL; 98.07 kWh NMC CATL
- Range: 1,155–1,270 km (718–789 mi) (EREV)
- Electric range: 201–266 km (125–165 mi) (EREV, WLTP); 245–356 km (152–221 mi) (EREV, CLTC); 650–755 km (404–469 mi) (EV, CLTC)

Dimensions
- Wheelbase: 3,020 mm (118.9 in)
- Length: 5,020 mm (197.6 in)
- Width: 1,999 mm (78.7 in)
- Height: 1,450–1,460 mm (57.1–57.5 in)
- Curb weight: 2,205–2,430 kg (4,861–5,357 lb)

The Avatr 12 (Chinese: 阿维塔12; pinyin: Ā wéi tǎ 12; pronounced "one two" or "yao er", not "twelve") is a battery electric and extended range executive car produced by Avatr Technology, a joint venture between Changan Automobile and lithium-ion battery provider CATL. It is the second vehicle under the Avatr brand.

== Overview ==
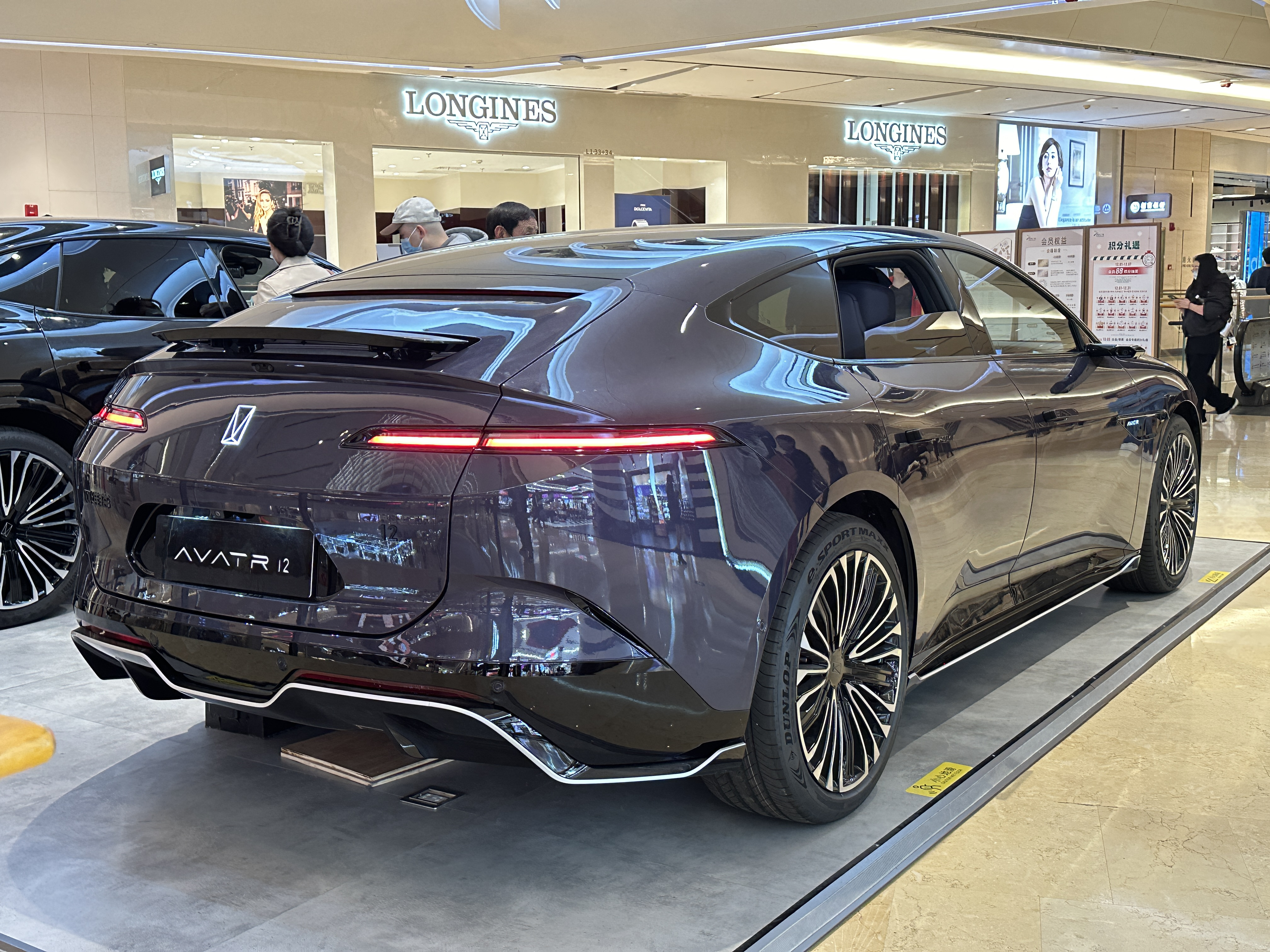
Rear view

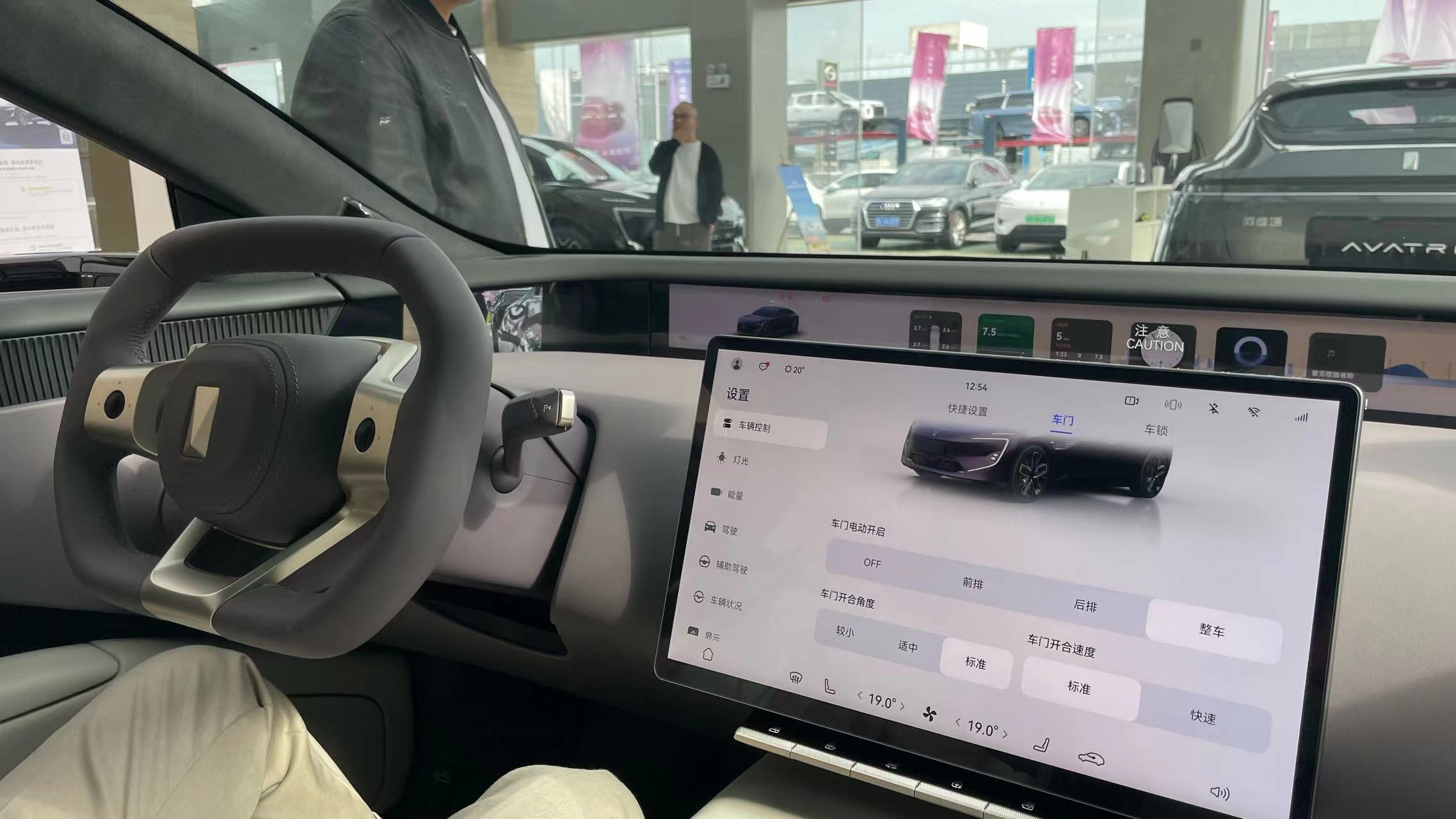
Interior

In July 2023, Avatr Technology presented the second model in its range as part of the expansion of the range that so far consisted of only the 11. The 12 took the form of a flagship executive car combining the features of a sedan and a fastback in its proportions. Like the 11, the styling design was created by former BMW designer Nader Faghihzadeh.

The characteristic visual features of the 11 with massive proportions were transferred to a more slender silhouette, which retained round edges, double lighting with a "C" motif and narrow strips of rear lamps. The door handles were hidden, and the small rear window was integrated with the smoothly sloping glass of the low roof. The edge of the trunk lid is topped with an optionally hinged spoiler, which opens together with the window, as in liftbacks. The car is also equipped with an optional camera system replacing traditional side mirrors. The wheels come in two sizes: 20 or 21 inches.

The interior features a steering wheel with an oval shape, and the central 15.6-inch touchscreen of the multimedia system dominates the central console. One large horizontal screen across the entire width of the cockpit.

=== 2026 update ===
The updated 12 was revealed on 20 March 2026, with sales beginning on 8 April. Major changes include new updated powertrain options and an upgraded ADAS system. The exterior now has pocket-style door handles replacing the previous power retracting type handles, and the interior features a new more prominent emergency mechanical door release located in the armrest in addition to the existing electronic release. Interior changes also include a more conventional door card, with power window controls moved from underneath the infotainment display to the armrest along with an open storage area. The steering wheel has new additional voice command and power boost button, the driver monitoring system has been upgraded, the headliner is now velour, and an "AVATR MAG" magnetic accessory attachment point has been added to the rear of the center console. The ADAS system has been upgraded to Huawei Qiankun ADS 4, which continues to use a 4-LiDAR sensor setup but has been updated to use Huawei's latest 896-line LiDAR. The 12 now features magnetorheological damping on its existing air suspension system, which uses a double wishbone geometry at the front and multilink setup at the rear. The front row receives a new center airbag.

The updated 12 uses a new Taihang Intelligent Control 2.0 drive system, which uses two motors each individually powering the rear wheels allowing the vehicle to correct for differential thrust in low-grip conditions. Avatr says the Taihang system can keep the vehicle under control in the event of a tire blowout at up to speeds up to 220 km/h (137 mph). The dual rear motors also lead to increased power output, with the base rear-wheel drive range extender variant outputting 536 hp (400 kW; 543 PS), while the top pure electric tri-motor all-wheel drive model outputs 955 hp (712 kW; 968 PS) and is capable of a claimed 0–100 km/h (62 mph) acceleration time of 2.9 seconds. The pure electric version also receives a new battery capable of 6C charging from 30–80% in 10 minutes.

== Avatr 012 ==
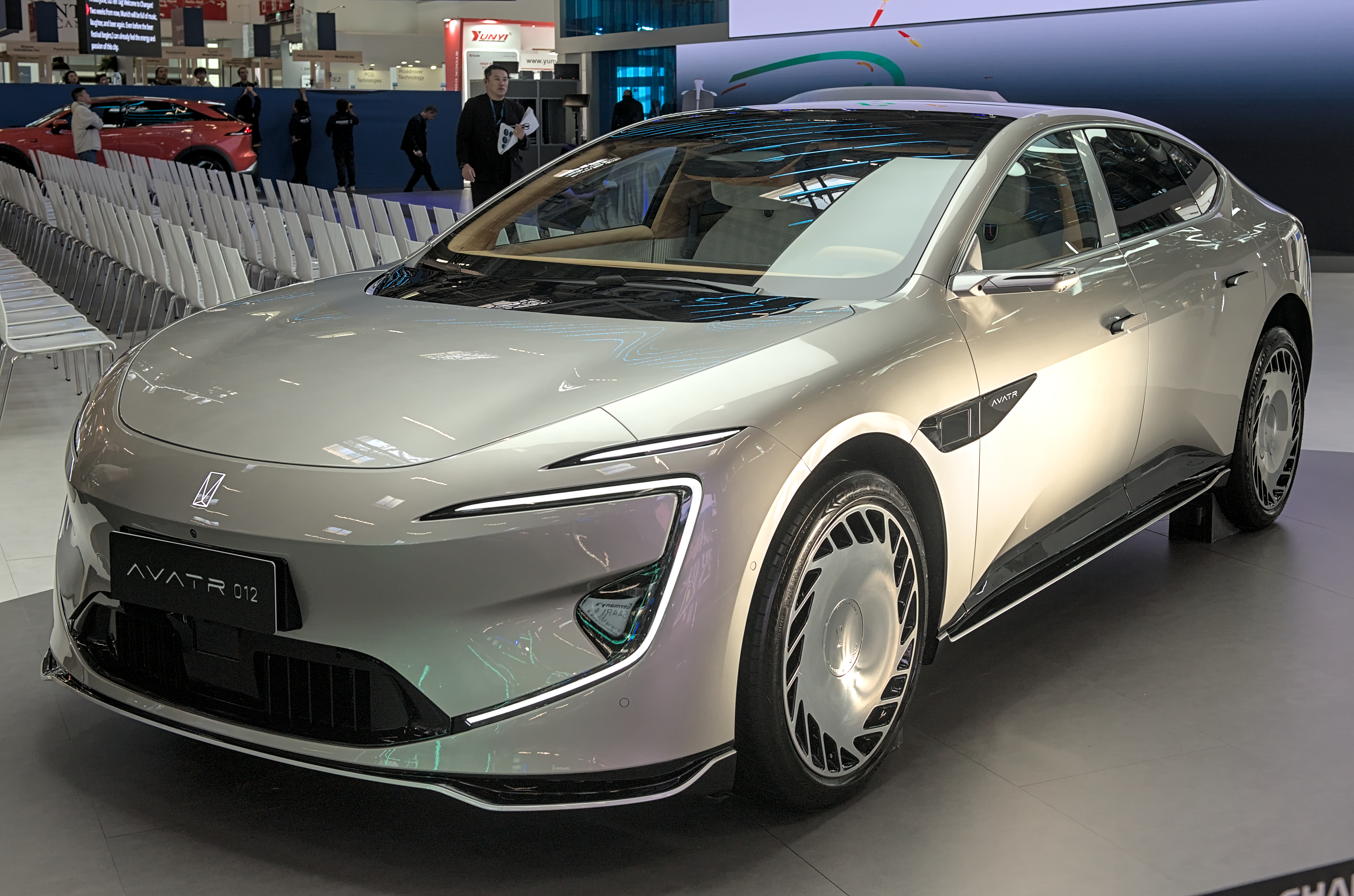
Avatr 012

On 12 August 2024, Avatr showcased a limited edition of the 12 called the Avatr 012 and opened bookings the same day, after first teasing the special edition earlier that year on 20 May. The model is codesigned by Avatr head designer Nader Faghihzadeh and Kim Jones, who was an artistic director at Dior and Fendi at the time. The exterior features custom 'liquid silver' paint, modified headlights, and 21-inch mirror-finished forged wheels. The interior uses the four-seater version with four-zone climate control, and features two-tone white vegetable-tanned Nappa leather and tan Alcantara upholstery, a geometric star design on the panoramic sunroof, special edition logos embossed in the headrests, and custom logo splash screen in the infotainment system. The steering wheel and B-pillar can have personalized engravings.

It uses a dual-motor 402 kW (539 hp; 547 PS) Huawei DriveONE powertrain paired with a 93.4 kWh CATL-supplied battery capable of 5C charging. It has a CLTC range rating of 650 kilometres (404 mi), 0–100 km/h (62 mph) acceleration time of 3.8 seconds, a top speed of 220 km/h (137 mph), and it can charge from 30–80% in 10 minutes. Production is limited to 700 units globally, and the vehicle comes with a complimentary Dior tote bag. The vehicle launched on 25 March 2025 at a significantly higher price of 700,000 yuan.

== Markets ==
The 12 was created for the domestic Chinese market, where its official debut took place in August 2023, and in early September, during IAA Mobility 2023 in Munich, the car was also presented to the European public. The beginning of deliveries of the first units to buyers was scheduled for December of the same year, positioning the model as a premium product. Sales began in China on 10 November 2023.

=== Qatar ===
After partnering with the Alattiya dealer in August 2024, the Avatr 12 was launched in Qatar on 24 February 2025.

== Powertrain ==
At launch, the 12 was available with two pure electric powertrain options, with motors are provided by Huawei. The base powertrain consists of one 313 hp (233 kW; 317 PS) motor powering the rear axle, which can be upgraded to a dual-motor all-wheel drive system with a total power of 578 hp (431 kW; 586 PS). The battery packs are supplied by Avatr co-creator and co-shareholder of Avatr CATL, and the BEV versions all using 94.53 kWh NMC pack capable of 240 kW peak charging speeds, allowing for a 30–80% charging time of 20 minutes, providing a range of 700 and 650 km (435 and 404 mi) for the RWD and AWD variants, respectively. For 2025, the 12 was upgraded with updated motors, with the rear-wheel drive variant now outputting 318 hp (237 kW; 322 PS) and CLTC range increasing by 55 km (34 mi) to 755 km (469 mi), and all-wheel drive variants outputting 539 hp (402 kW; 546 PS) and a similar range increase to 705 km (438 mi). For 2026, the rear axle powertrain was upgraded to a twin-motor setup of 251 kW motors for a total of 673 hp (502 kW; 682 PS), while the all-wheel drive version adds a 210 kW front motor for a total of 955 hp (712 kW; 968 PS) and a claimed 0–100 km/h (62 mph) acceleration time of 2.9 seconds. The battery for all electric models has been updated to a 98.07 kWh NMC pack supplied by CATL, capable of 6C charging, a 560 kW peak charge rate, and allowing for a 30–80% charging time of 10 minutes.

In 2025, a range extender powertrain option was added. It uses a 1.5-liter turbocharged inline-four petrol engine provided by Changan with a peak power output of 154 hp (115 kW; 156 PS), and is capable of contributing up to 110 kW (148 hp; 150 PS) when running. It is exclusively available with a 310 hp (231 kW; 314 PS) rear motor, and has a 39 kWh LFP pack capable of 240 kW peak charging speeds, allowing for a 30–80% charging time of 20 minutes, providing a CLTC electric range of 245 km (152 mi), and a combined range of 1,155 km (718 mi). In 2025, the battery was upgraded to a 52 kWh LFP pack with a CLTC electric range of 356 km (221 mi). In 2026, the motors were upgraded to a twin-motor setup of 200 kW motors for a total of 536 hp (400 kW; 543 PS).

Specifications
| Model | Year | Battery | | Configuration | | | Power | Torque | Electric range | | Fast charging | | 0–100 km/h (62 mph) | Top speed | Weight |
| Model | Year | Type | Weight | Engine | Front | Rear | Power | Torque | WLTP | CLTC | Peak DC | 30–80% time | 0–100 km/h (62 mph) | Top speed | Weight |
Range extender
| RWD | 2025 | 39.05 kWh LFP CATL | 315 kg (694 lb) | JL469ZQ1 1.5 L turbo 154 hp (115 kW; 156 PS) | — | 231 kW PMSM ATDM01 | 310 hp (231 kW; 314 PS) | 367 N⋅m (271 lb⋅ft) | 201 km (125 mi) | 245 km (152 mi) | 120 kW | 15 min | 6.7 s | 190 km/h (118 mph) | 2,255 kg (4,971 lb) |
| RWD | 2026–present | 52.01 kWh LFP CATL | 370 kg (816 lb) | JL469ZQ1 1.5 L turbo 154 hp (115 kW; 156 PS) | — | 231 kW PMSM ATDM03 | 310 hp (231 kW; 314 PS) | 333 N⋅m (246 lb⋅ft) | 266 km (165 mi) | 356 km (221 mi) | 240 kW | 10 min | 6.8 s | 190 km/h (118 mph) | 2,325 kg (5,126 lb) |
| Dual-motor RWD | 2026–present | 52.01 kWh LFP CATL | 370 kg (816 lb) | JL469ZQ1 1.5 L turbo 154 hp (115 kW; 156 PS) | — | 2×200 kW PMSM ATDM06 | 536 hp (400 kW; 543 PS) | 690 N⋅m (509 lb⋅ft) | 261 km (162 mi) | 350 km (217 mi) | 240 kW | 10 min | 5.1 s | 220 km/h (137 mph) | 2,345 kg (5,170 lb) |
Pure electric
| RWD | 2023–24 | 94.53 kWh NMC CATL | | — | — | 230 kW PMSM TZ210XY584 | 309 hp (230 kW; 313 PS) | 370 N⋅m (273 lb⋅ft) | — | 700 km (435 mi) | 240 kW | 20 min | 6.7 s | 215 km/h (134 mph) | 2,205 kg (4,861 lb) |
| AWD | 2023–24 | 94.53 kWh NMC CATL | | — | 195 kW induction YS210XY584 | 230 kW PMSM TZ210XY584 | 570 hp (425 kW; 578 PS) | 650 N⋅m (479 lb⋅ft) | — | 650 km (404 mi) | 240 kW | 20 min | 3.9 s | 220 km/h (137 mph) | 2,325 kg (5,126 lb) |
| RWD | 2025–26 | 94.53 kWh NMC CATL | | — | — | 237 kW PMSM TZ210XYA02 | 318 hp (237 kW; 322 PS) | 396 N⋅m (292 lb⋅ft) | — | 755 km (469 mi) | 240 kW | 20 min | 6.1 s | 215 km/h (134 mph) | 2,225 kg (4,905 lb) |
| AWD | 2025–26 | 94.53 kWh NMC CATL | | — | 165 kW induction YS210XYA01 | 237 kW PMSM TZ210XYA02 | 539 hp (402 kW; 546 PS) | 687 N⋅m (507 lb⋅ft) | — | 705 km (438 mi) | 240 kW | 20 min | 3.8 s | 220 km/h (137 mph) | 2,365 kg (5,214 lb) |
| Dual-motor BEV | 2026–present | 98.07 kWh NMC CATL | | — | — | 2×251 kW PMSM ATDM05 | 673 hp (502 kW; 682 PS) | 750 N⋅m (553 lb⋅ft) | — | 735 km (457 mi) | 560 kW | 10 min | 4.1 s | 220 km/h (137 mph) | 2,290 kg (5,049 lb) |
| Tri-motor BEV | 2026–present | 98.07 kWh NMC CATL | | — | 210 kW induction AYDM03 | 2×251 kW PMSM ATDM05 | 955 hp (712 kW; 968 PS) | 996 N⋅m (735 lb⋅ft) | — | 670 km (416 mi) | 560 kW | 10 min | 2.9 s | 230 km/h (143 mph) | 2,410–2,430 kg (5,313–5,357 lb) |

== Sales ==
| Year | China | | |
| Year | EV | EREV | Total |
|---|---|---|---|
| 2023 | 3,387 | — | 1,820 |
| 2024 | 24,300 | 3,962 | 26,658 |
| 2025 | 9,847 | 8,424 | 18,271 |
