= Avatr Technology =

Automotive manufacturing company

Avatr Technology Co., Ltd.

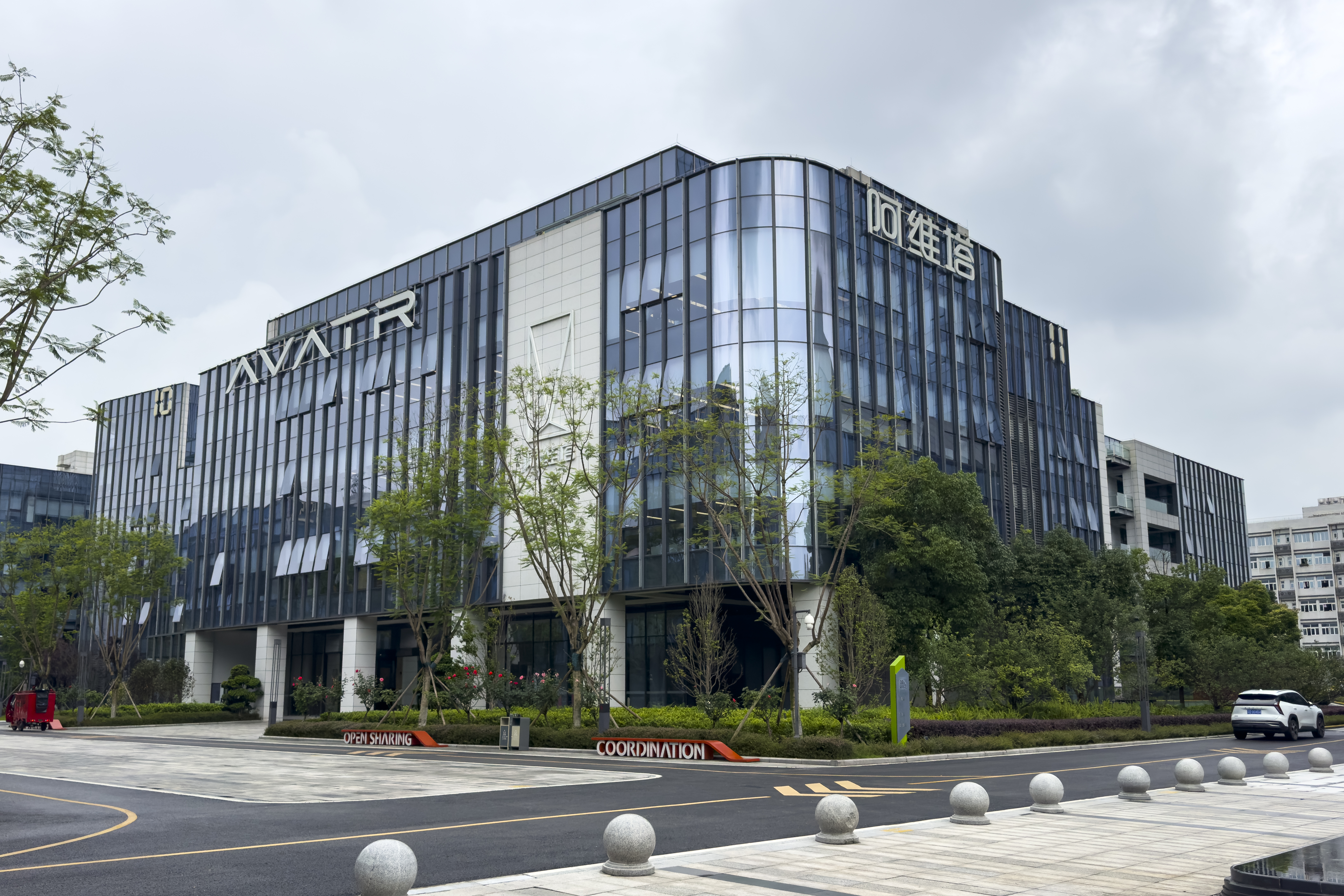
- Headquarters in Liangjiang New Area, Chongqing
- Native name: 阿维塔科技（重庆）有限公司
- Formerly: Chang'an-Nio
- Type: State-owned joint venture
- Industry: Automotive
- Founded: 2018; 8 years ago
- Founders: China Changan Automobile; Huawei; CATL
- Headquarters: Chongqing, China
- Area served: China
- Key people: Wang Hui (Chairman); Chen Zhuo (president and CEO); Nader Faghihzadeh (head designer)
- Products: Automobiles
- Production output: ▲73,606 vehicles (2024)
- Owner: China Changan Automobile (40.99%); CATL (14.1%); Chongqing Chengan Foundation (11.17%); China Southern Asset Management (6.34%); National Green Development Fund (4.46%); Fujian Mindong Electric (2.94%); Liangjiang Western Securities (1.10%); Southern Industrial Fund (0.73%); Nio (0.67%)
- Number of employees: 1,000+
- Website: www.avatr.com
- Footnotes; The company's registered address was Jiangning District Nanjing City Jiangsu Province, and the registered address was moved to Yubei District Chongqing City in January 2021.

Avatr Technology Co., Ltd. (Chinese: 阿维塔; pinyin: Ā wéi tǎ; pronounced "Avatar") is a Chinese electric vehicle manufacturer headquartered in Chongqing.

Avatr Technology was established in 2018, with China Changan Automobile and CATL as its first and second largest shareholders, holding 40.99% and 14.1% equity stakes in collaboration with various Chinese domestic entities. Huawei supplies advanced driver-assistance systems algorithms and smart cockpit solutions.

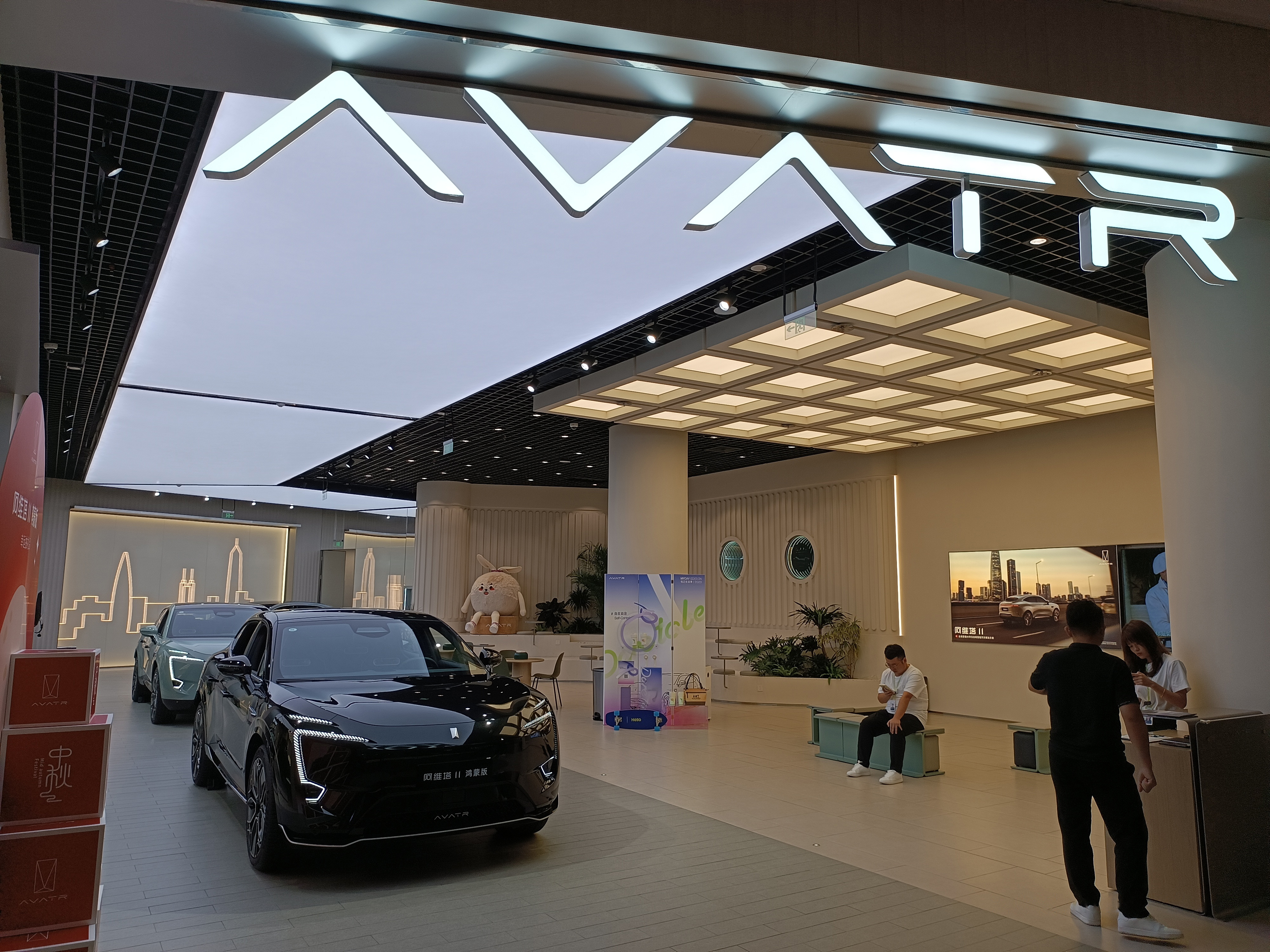
Avatr showroom in Shenzhen, China

== History ==
=== Changan-Nio ===
In 2018, Changan aimed to establish a company dedicated to developing modern, technologically advanced electric vehicles in partnership with Nio Inc. To achieve this, a joint venture named Changan-Nio was formed with an equal 50:50 share ratio. However, the partnership did not materialize, as Nio withdrew from the alliance two years later.

=== Establishment of Avatr ===
Following Nio's withdrawal, Changan Automobile as the primary shareholder partnered with battery manufacturer CATL. In May 2021, the company was renamed from Changan-Nio to Avatr Technology.

In November 2021, Avatr conducted its first round of capital increase and share expansion, resulting in a dilution of Changan Automobile's ownership from 95.38% to 39.02%. CATL acquired a 23.99% stake, while the remaining shares were held by various investment entities. Although Huawei did not become a shareholder, it collaborated closely with Avatr, providing comprehensive technological solutions.

In August 2022, Avatr initiated its Series A funding round, attracting three additional investors supported by Chinese private enterprises and local governments. The total financing scale reached nearly 5 billion yuan. As a result, Changan Automobile's ownership stake increased from 39.02% to 40.99%. CATL, which did not participate in the capital increase, saw its ownership stake diluted from 23.99% to 17.10%.

In August 2023, Avatr completed its Series B financing round, achieving a valuation of nearly 20 billion RMB. Changan Automobile, China Southern Industrial Asset Management, and Liangjiang Industrial Fund continued to increase their investments. Additionally, it attracted state-owned capital from Chongqing Industrial Investment Fund, China Everbright Investment, and Guangkai Holdings. Changan Automobile remains the largest shareholder, with its ownership stake unchanged at 40.99%. CATL is the second-largest shareholder, with its ownership stake decreasing from 17.10% to 14.10%, and Chongqing Chengan Foundation, a state-owned foundation, is the third-largest shareholder, with its ownership stake decreasing from 13.55% to 11.17%.

In August 2024, Avatr announced an investment in Huawei's subsidiary, Yinwang (Shenzhen Yinwang Intelligent Technology Co., Ltd.), acquiring a 10% stake for RMB 11.5 billion and becoming Yinwang's second-largest shareholder. Yinwang, formerly known as Huawei Intelligent Automotive Solution, serves as Huawei's automotive business unit. In the second half of 2023, Huawei opted to operate its business unit independently and open it to public equity investment. Avatr became the first company to invest in Huawei's new unit, Yinwang. This transition upgraded the previous "HI" (Huawei Inside) model to the enhanced "HI Plus" model, allowing Huawei to play a more integral role in defining Avatr's products.

In December 2024, Avatr has secured over 11 billion yuan (1.5 billion USD) in its Series C financing round. After the capital increase, Changan Automobile's shareholding ratio remained unchanged at 40.99%, China Southern Assets' shareholding ratio decreased from 7.81% to 6.34%, Anyu Fund's shareholding ratio was 8.81%, and BoCom Investment's shareholding ratio increased from 1.76% to 3.34%.

Avatr is currently collaborating with Momenta on an overseas vehicle project codenamed 15G. The first model has already begun overseas testing and is expected to be completed by the end of September. The jointly developed vehicle is likely to be launched first in the Middle East market.

Avatr was originally named 安为德 (Ān wèi dé), but 阿维塔 (Ā wéi tǎ) is the currently used name as it is easier to pronounce and translate to other languages. 安为德 is the abbreviation of China Changan Automobile, Huawei and CATL in Chinese.

== Corporate Leadership ==
=== Chairmans ===
- Li Bin (2018–2021)
- Tan Benhong (2021–2023)
- Zhu Huarong (2023–present)

=== Chief Executive Officers/CEOs ===
- Tan Benhong (2021–2023)
- Chen Zhuo (2023–present)

== Products ==
The first Avatr vehicle was the large, fully electric SUV E11, which stands out from competing designs with a long range on one charge of approximately 700 km (430 mi). The start of production of the first model for the domestic Chinese market was scheduled for the second quarter of 2022, with deliveries of the first units scheduled for the end of the same year. Finally, the production model called Avatr 11, with the letter "E" finally removed from its name, officially debuted in August 2022. Sales of the luxury electric car began in November 2022, a year after the official launch of the new company, positioning it as a premium product. At the same time, Avatr Technology expressed its intention to expand its model offer by 4 new cars by 2025. The first model that is part of the expansion of the Avatr brand is an executive car, dubbed the 12, which was officially presented in July 2023.

=== Current ===
- Avatr 11 (2022–present), mid-size SUV, BEV/REEV
- Avatr 12 (2023–present), mid-size sedan, BEV/REEV
- Avatr 07 (2024–present), mid-size SUV, BEV/REEV
  - Avatr 07L (2026–present), mid-size SUV, BEV/REEV
- Avatr 06 (2025–present), mid-size sedan, BEV/REEV
  - Avatr 06T (2026–present), station wagon variant
- Avatr T09 (to commence), full size SUV, REEV
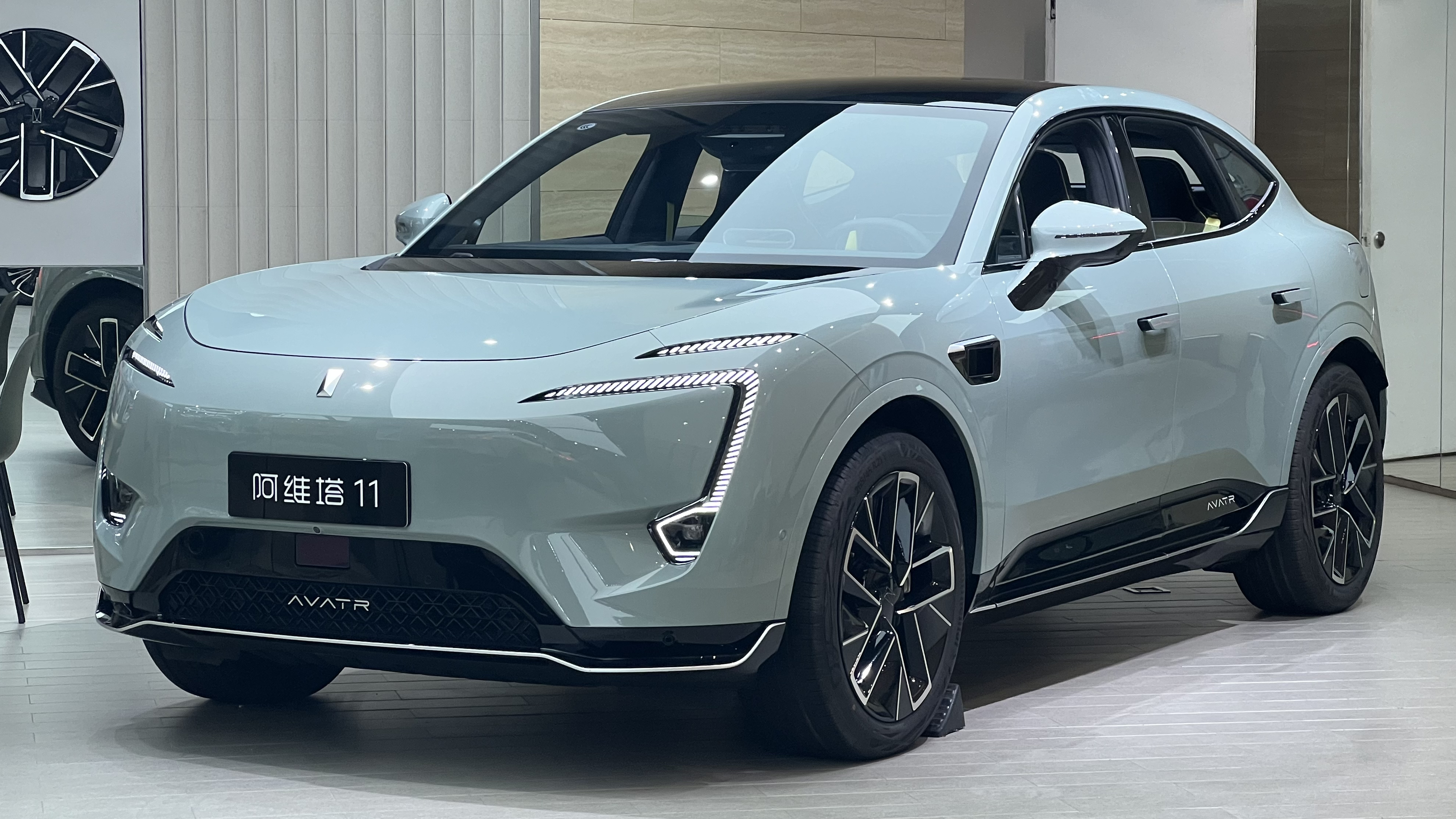
Avatr 11

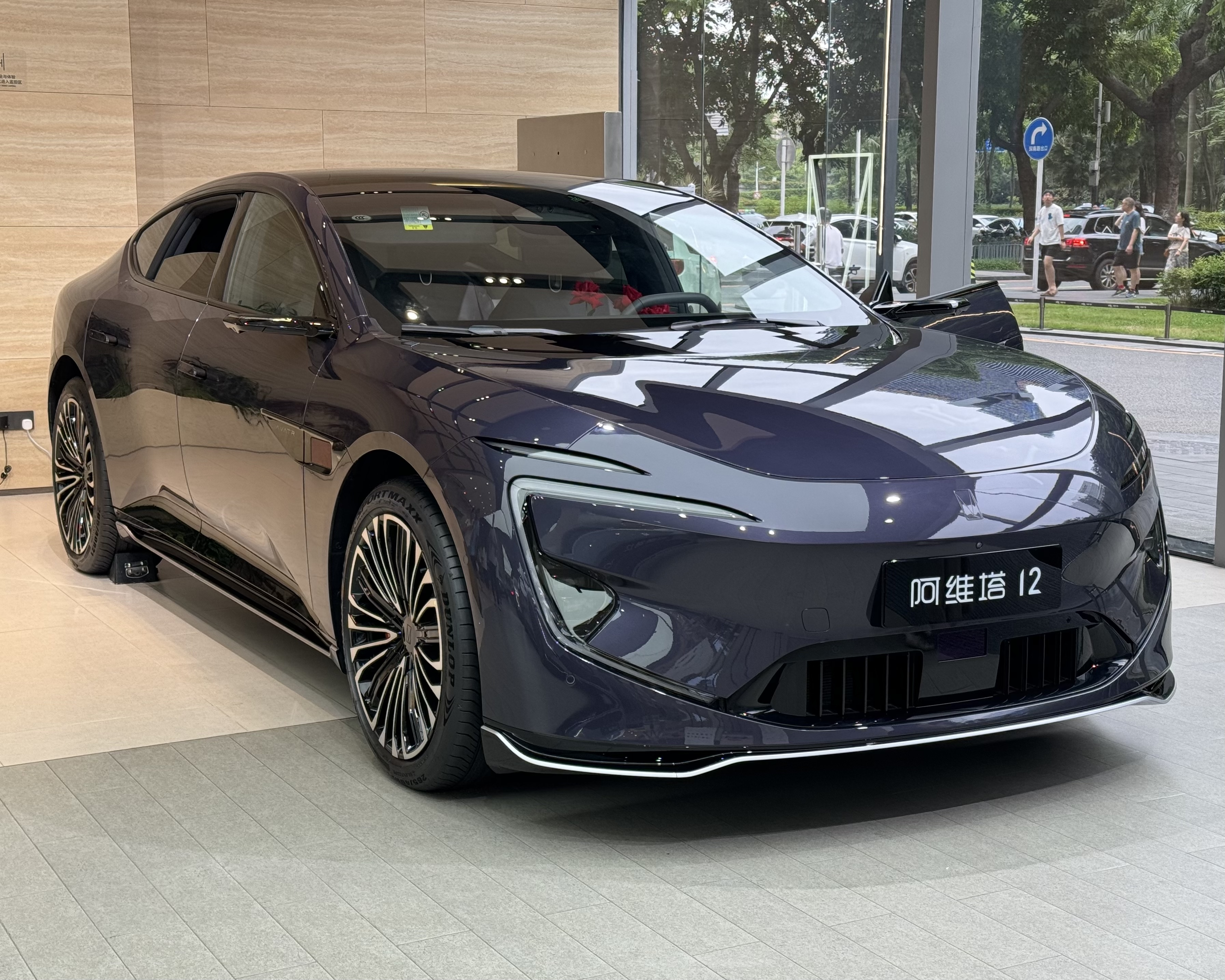
Avatr 12

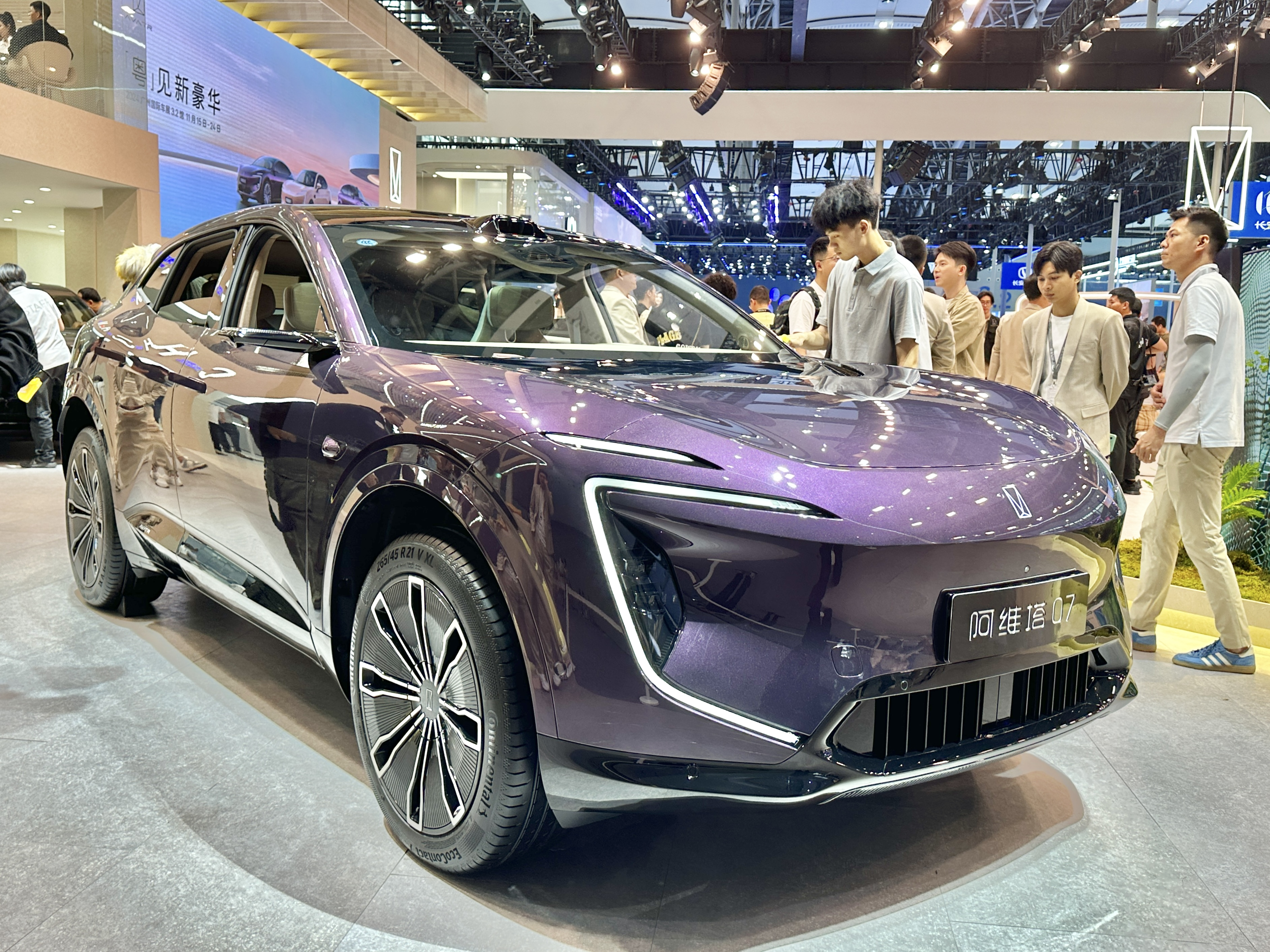
Avatr 07

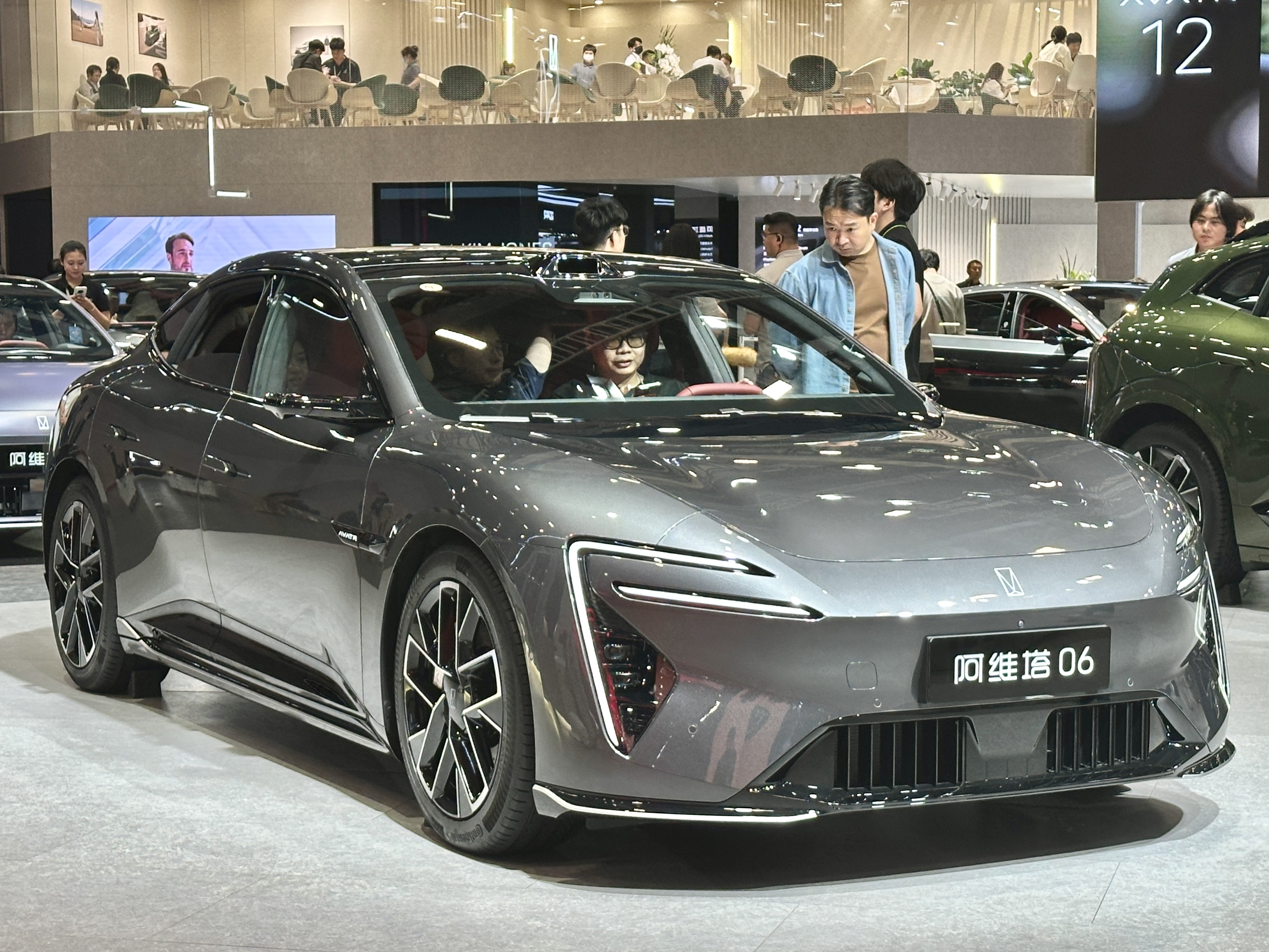
Avatr 06

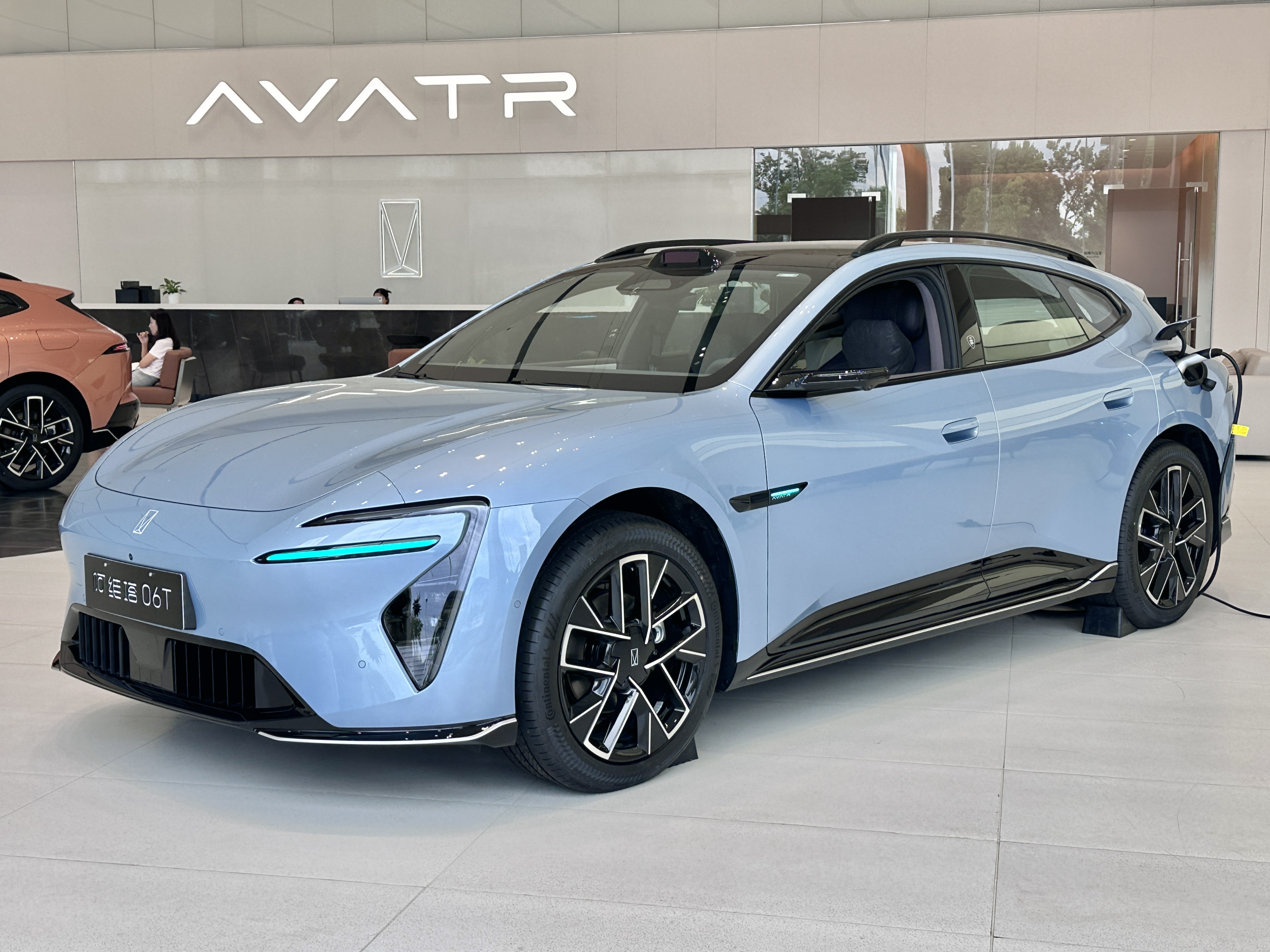
Avatr 06T

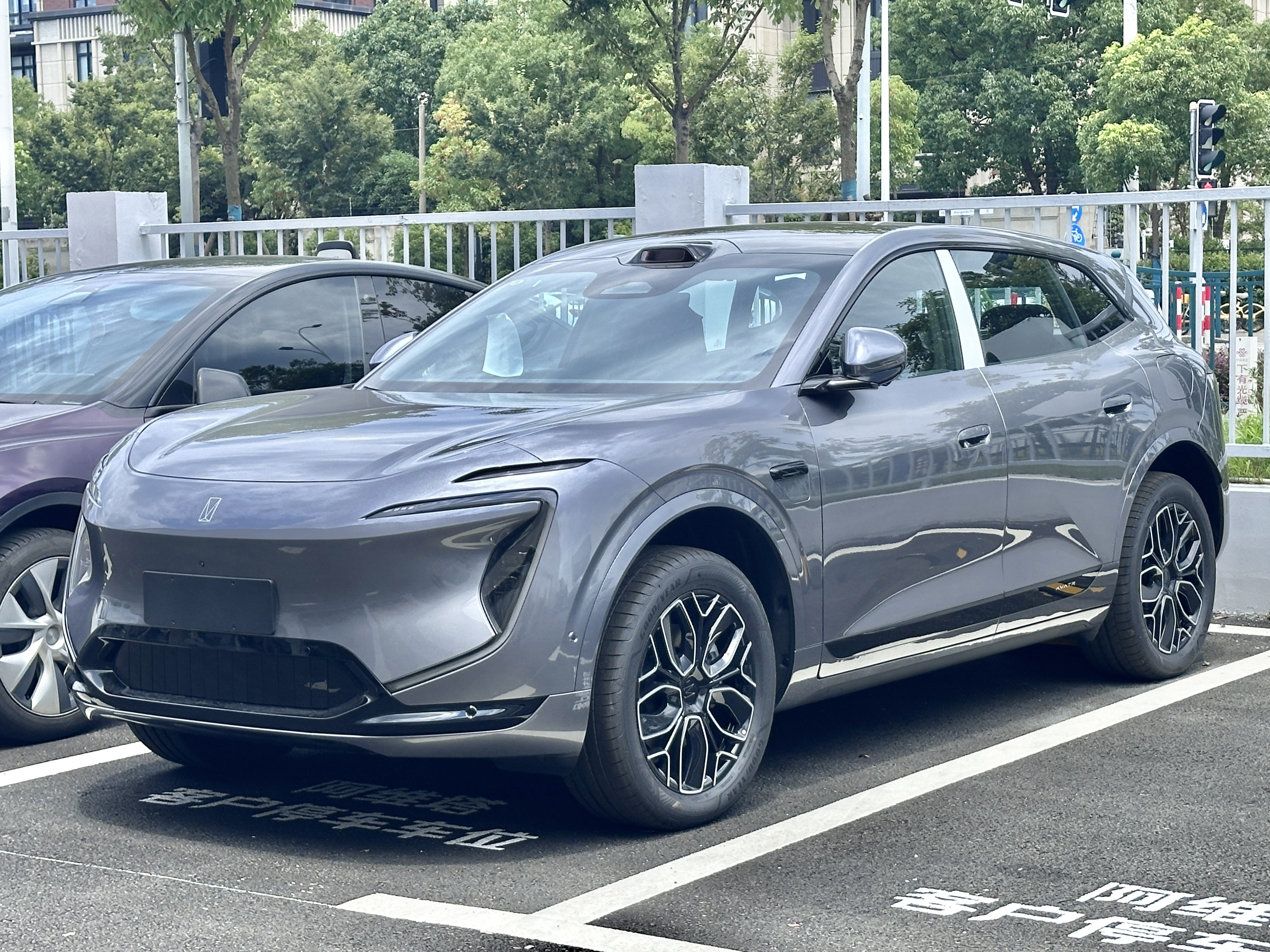
Avatr 07L

=== Upcoming ===
- D706 (expected 2026), flagship MPV, NEV

=== Concept ===
- Avatr Vision Xpectra (2025)
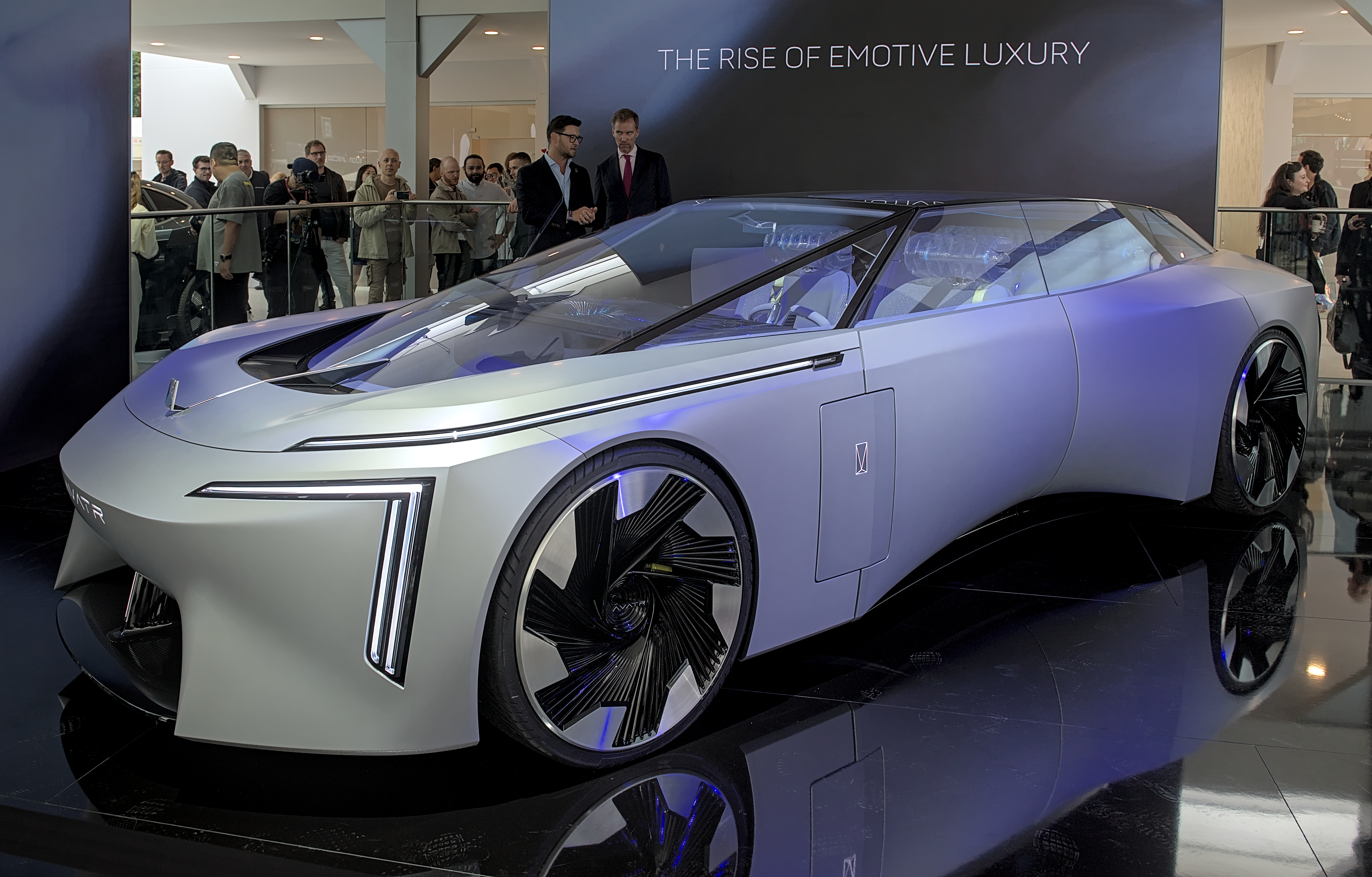
Avatr Vision Xpectra

== CHN platform ==
Avatr claims to integrate the strengths of Changan Automobile, Huawei, and CATL's Chinese name Ningde Shidai to establish the "CHN" cooperation model. According to Avatr, the smart electric vehicle technology platform CHN utilizes a six-layer architecture: the mechanical layer, energy layer, electronic and electrical architecture layer, vehicle operating system layer, vehicle function application layer, and cloud big data layer. The company asserts that products developed on this platform feature high integration, scalability, performance, endurance, security, computing power, intelligence, and adaptability. The platform reportedly supports the development of models with up to a 3,100mm wheelbase, accommodates various vehicle types such as sedans, SUVs, MPVs, and crossovers, and is compatible with both rear-wheel drive and four-wheel drive configurations.

== Sales ==
At a presentation at the 2025 Chongqing Auto Show on 7 June 2025, Avatr announced that it had surpassed a cumulative sales total of 150,000 vehicles with an average selling price over CN¥ 270,000 (US$37,600).

Annual sales
Year	Sales
2022	757
2023	27,700
2024	73,606
2025	120,000

== See also ==
- China Changan Automobile
- Huawei
- CATL
- Automobile manufacturers and brands of China
- List of automobile manufacturers of China
