= Avatr 11 =

Battery electric mid-size luxury crossover SUV

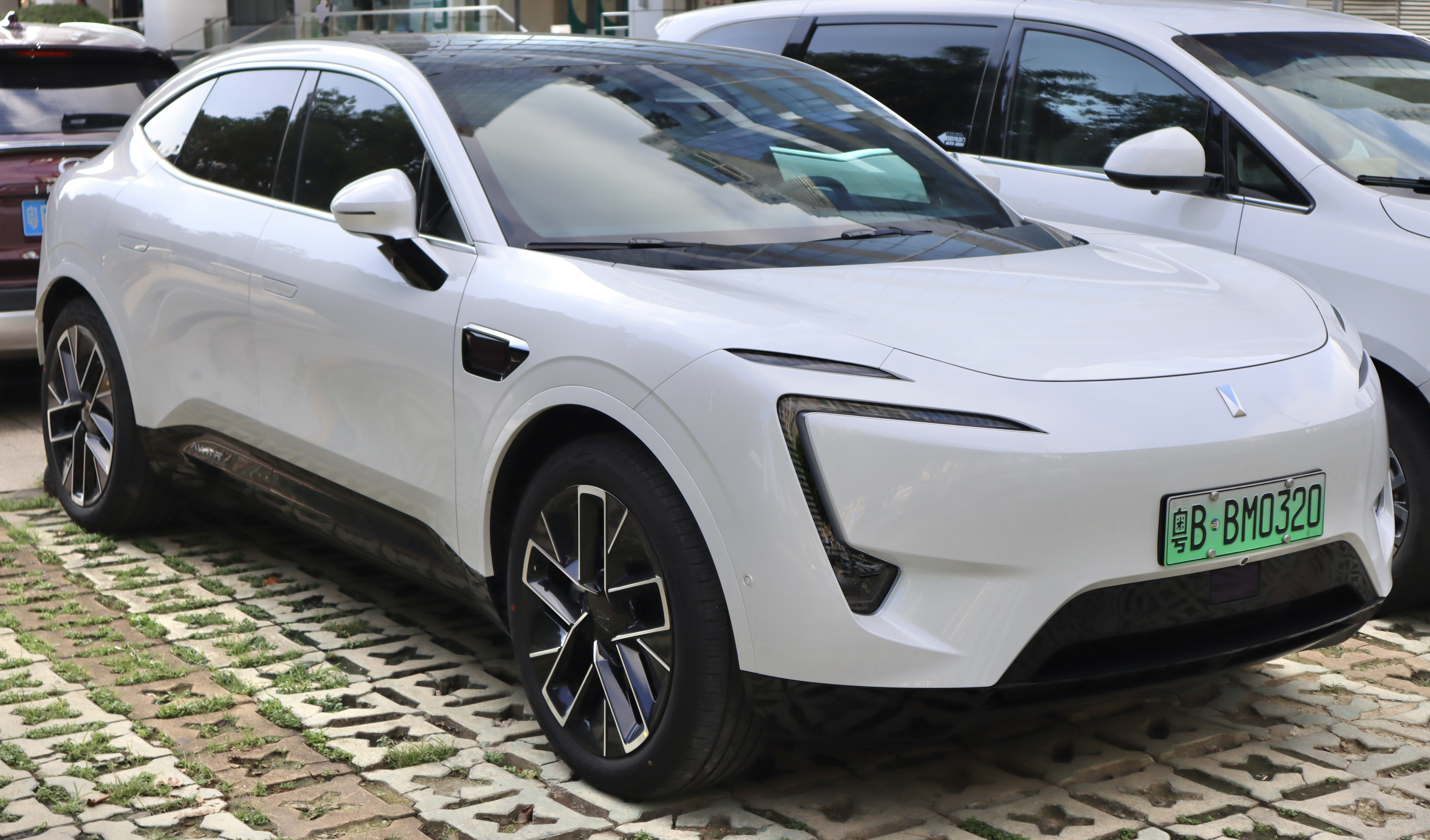

Overview
- Manufacturer: Avatr Technology
- Also called: Avatr E11 (former name)
- Production: 2022–present
- Assembly: China: Chongqing
- Designer: Nader Faghihzadeh; Jan Poliak; Nicolas Guille; Pedro Ruperto

Body and chassis
- Class: Mid-size luxury crossover SUV
- Body style: 5-door coupe SUV
- Layout: Rear-motor rear-wheel-drive; Dual-motor 4WD
- Platform: CHN
- Related: Avatr 12

Powertrain
- Engine: Petrol range extender: 1.5 L JL469ZQ1 turbo I4 (EREV)
- Electric motor: AC induction/asynchronous, Permanent magnet motor
- Power output: 230 kW (310 PS; 310 hp) (RWD); 425 kW (578 PS; 570 hp) (AWD)
- Transmission: 1-speed direct-drive reduction
- Hybrid drivetrain: Range extender series plug-in hybrid (Kunlun EREV)
- Battery: 90.38 kWh NMC CATL; 116.79 kWh NMC CATL
- Electric range: 575–680 km (357–423 mi) (NEDC); 555–730 km (345–454 mi) (CLTC)

Dimensions
- Wheelbase: 2,975 mm (117.1 in)
- Length: 4,880 mm (192.1 in)
- Width: 1,970 mm (77.6 in)
- Height: 1,601 mm (63.0 in)
- Curb weight: 2,365 kg (5,214 lb)

The Avatr 11 (Chinese: 阿维塔11; pinyin: Ā wéi tǎ 11) is a battery electric and extended range mid-size luxury crossover SUV produced by Avatr Technology, a joint venture between Changan Automobile and lithium-ion battery provider CATL. It is the first vehicle under the Avatr brand. In 2018, a joint venture formed between Changan and Nio. Later, CATL replaced Nio as the second biggest shareholder when Nio withdrew during a financial crisis. As of 2022, Changan holds 40.99% of shares, and CATL owns 17.1%. Huawei has no shares in Avatr while supplying the hardware including electric motors and software for intelligent driving, connectivity, and infotainment.

== Overview ==
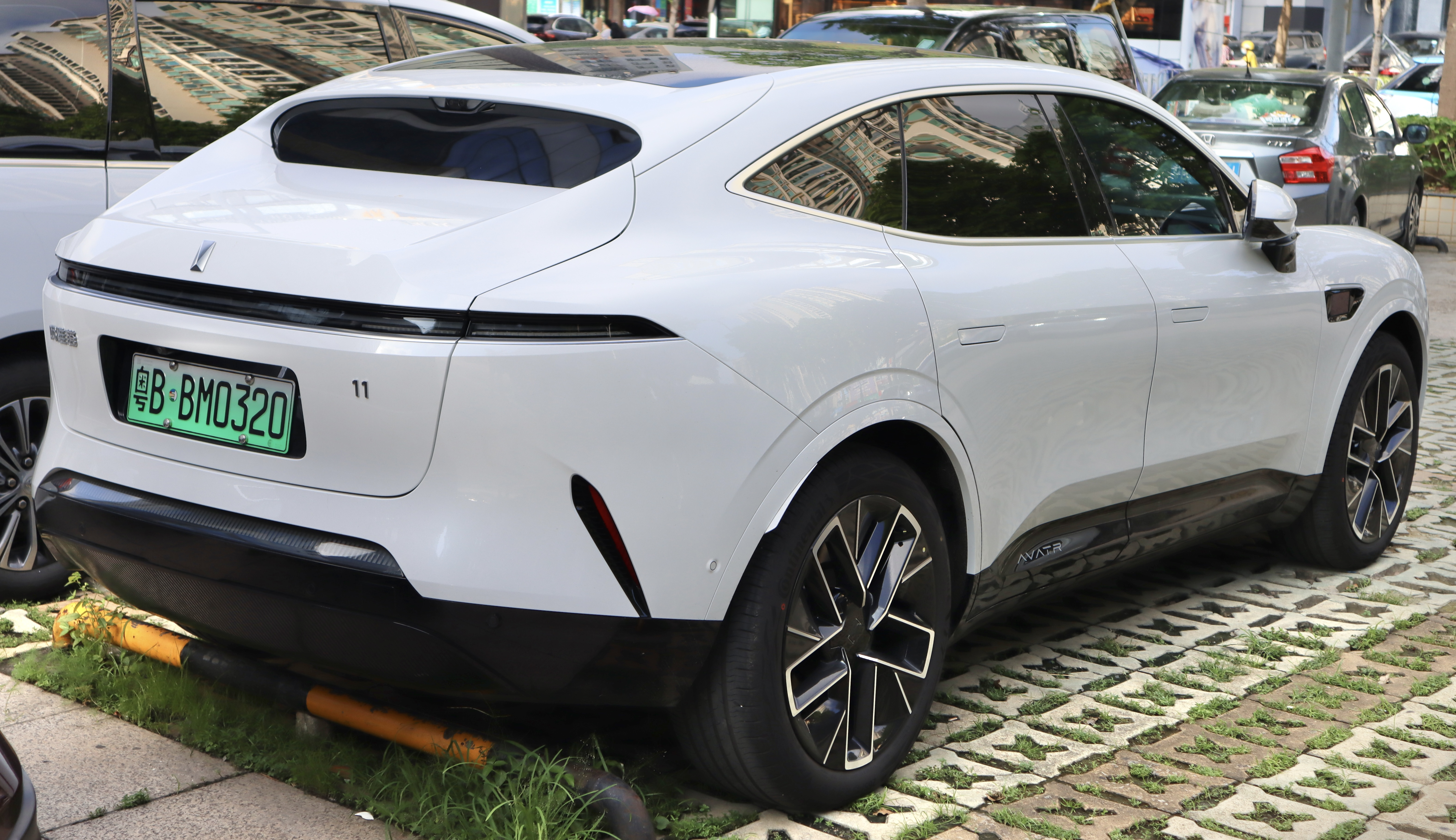
Rear view

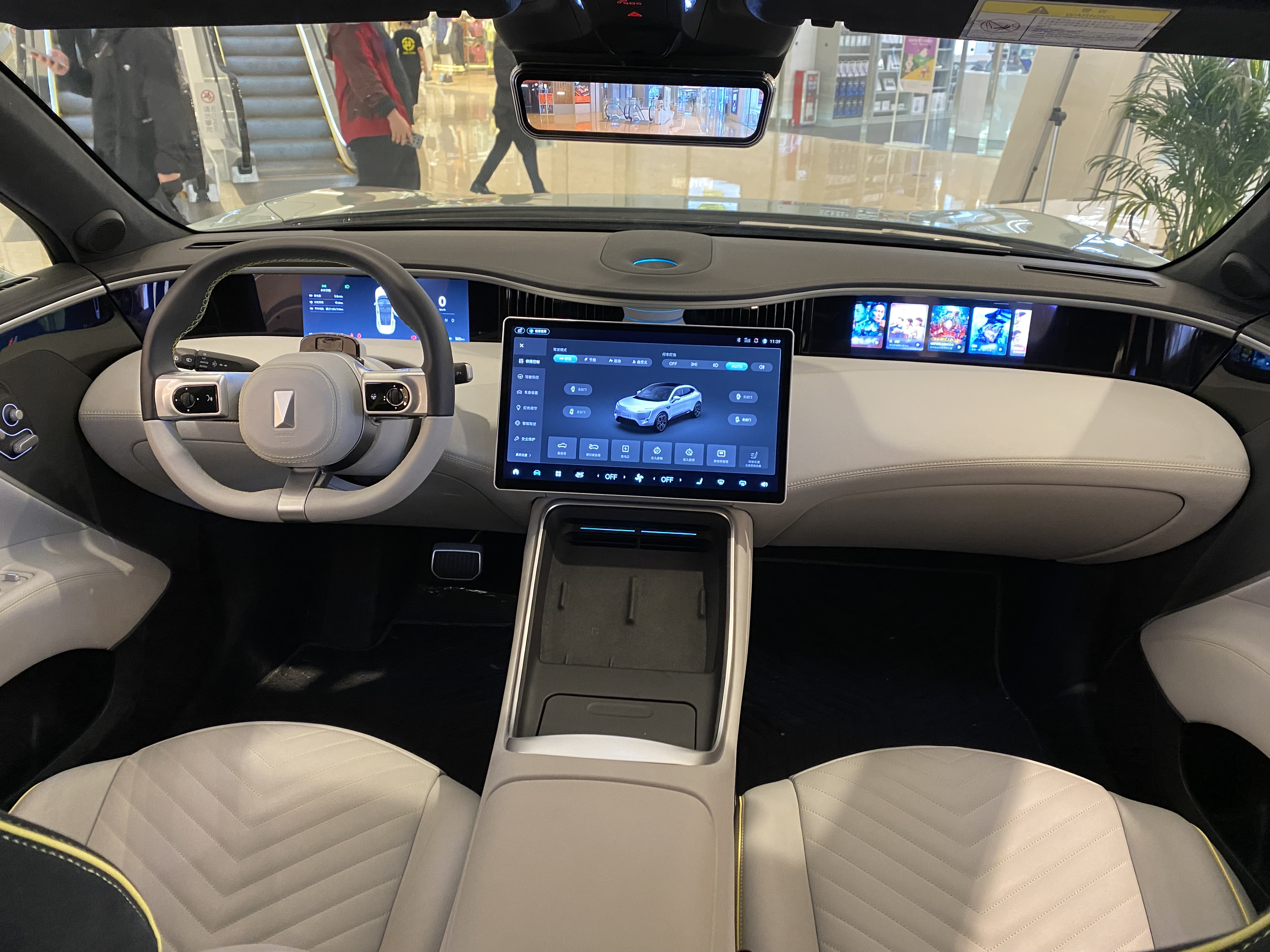
Interior

The Avatr 11 is a mid-size luxury fastback crossover offered in either four-seat or five-seat variants. The interior is dominated by a dashboard that houses a 10.25-inch digital instrument cluster, a 15.6-inch infotainment screen, and a 10.25-inch passenger display. There are also two wireless charging pads and a 14-speaker sound system complete with Road Noise Cancellation and an Active Sound Enhancement system. The Avatr 11 is equipped with Huawei's HarmonyOS and DriveONE twin-motor four-wheel drive systems. Avatr is the second co-developed brand of Huawei and OEMs that has settled in Huawei's stores after AITO. The intelligent driving system of Avatr 11 utilizes a 400 TOPS processor and 34 sensors, including 3 LiDARs, allowing for assisted driving on highways and smaller roads with lane change assist, traffic light recognition, and pedestrian detection as the key features.

There are three trim levels available of the car, all with dual-motor AWD setup as standard. Deliveries of the two cheaper variants of the Avatr 11 are scheduled to begin in December 2022. The top-of-the-trim model is expected to follow in the first quarter of 2023. In addition to the three regular trim levels, Avatr also offers a limited edition variant called the Avatr 011 MMW, a collaboration with Matthew M. Williams limited to 500 units.

== Markets ==
The Avatr 11 was originally launched in China on 8 August 2022.

=== Brunei ===
As the introduction of the Avatr brand in Brunei, Maju Motors, its vehicle official distributor, was launched the Avatr 11 on 26 February 2025. It is offered only in sole rear-wheel drive configuration and 116.79 kWh nickel-cobalt manganese battery in 680 kilometres range variant.

=== Nepal ===
The Avatr 11 launched in the Nepal market in August 2024. It is available with either battery option and rear-wheel drive only.

=== Qatar ===
After partnering with the Alattiya dealer in August 2024, the Avatr 11 was launched in Qatar on 24 February 2025.

=== Thailand ===
The Avatr 11 was launched in Thailand on 17 September 2024, with two variants: Standard Range (90.38 kWh) and Long Range (116.79 kWh). In November 2025, the Royal Edition AWD (116.79 kWh) added to the line-up. In July 2026, the Standard Range and Long Range variants were replaced by the Ultra RWD and Ultra AWD, respectively.

=== Pakistan ===
Avatr launched its Avatr 11 in Pakistan in December 2025, officially entering the Pakistani market through Master Changan Motors.

== Specifications ==
The Avatr 11 is powered by a pair of electric motors that combine to produce 570 hp (425 kW; 578 PS) and 479 lb-ft (650 Nm) of torque. The motors were developed by Huawei and the front motor develops a maximum output of 261 hp (195 kW; 265 PS) while the rear motor develops a maximum output of 309 hp (230 kW; 313 PS). The motors are powered by a 90.38 kWh CATL-supplied NMC battery pack assembled in the CTP (cell-to-pack) format in standard trim, or a 116.79 kWh pack in the flagship model. The 0 to 100 km/h (62 mph) acceleration time of the Avatr 11 is under 3.98 seconds and top speed is 200 km/h (124 mph). Variants equipped with the smaller battery achieve 555 km (345 mi) of range on the CLTC cycle, while the models powered by the larger pack achieve 680 km (420 mi) of range. The Avatr 11's 750V high-voltage platform also supports 240 kW charging, capable of adding 200 km (124 mi) of range within 10 minutes.

== Safety ==
C-NCAP (2021) test results Avatr 11 90 kWh 4WD
Category		%
Overall:	5 /5 stars	90.2%
Occupant protection:		93.75%
Vulnerable road users:		68.11%
Active safety:		94.80%

== Sales ==
Year	China		
Year	EV	EREV	Total
2023	17,707	—	21,665
2024	7,544	272	8,645
2025	1,897	1,386	3,283
