= Nader Faghihzadeh =

Iranian-German automobile designer

- نادر فقیه‌زاده
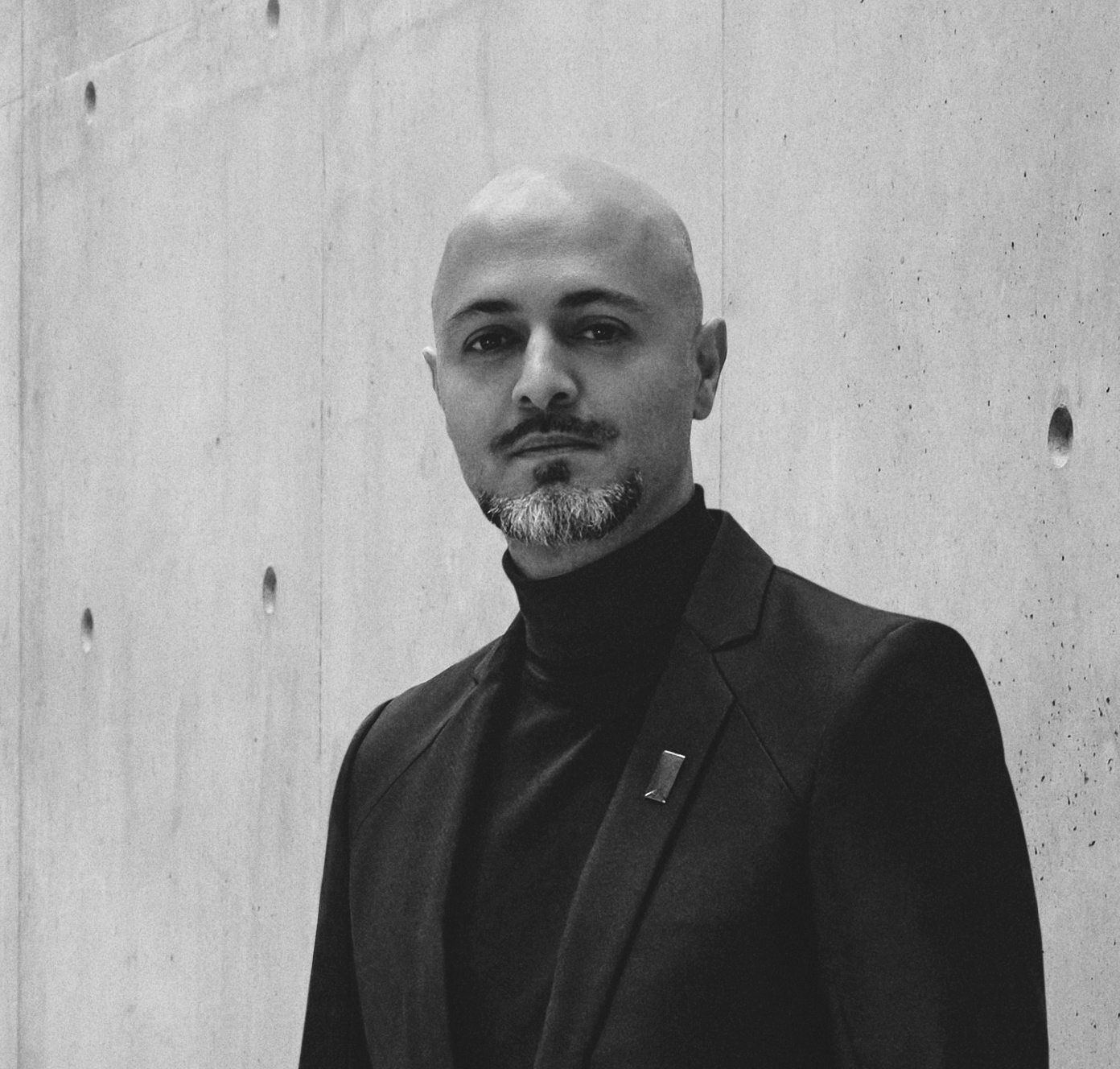
- Born: 1976 (age 49–50); Tehran, Iran
- Citizenship: Germany
- Education: University of Pforzheim
- Occupation: Automobile Designer
- Employer(s): BMW, AVATR
- Known for: Automobile design

Nader Faghihzadeh (Persian: نادر فقیه‌زاده, born 1976 in Tehran) is an Iranian-German automotive designer based in Munich. After 17 years with BMW, he moved to Changan-NIO in 2019, becoming co-founder of the China-based EV manufacturer AVATR as Chief Design Officer in 2019.

During his 17 years at BMW starting in 2000, he was responsible for the interior design of the BMW 7 Series (F01/F02), the exterior design of the BMW 6 Series Gran Coupé, Coupé and Convertible (F06/F12/F13) and the exterior design of the BMW 7 series (G11/G12). Additionally, he contributed to the design of the BMW i3s, BMW i8, and iNext concept cars as the interior and exterior design director of BMW i, and he served as the creative director for the exterior design of the BMW 3 series (G20/G21/G28), BMW X3 (G01), and BMW X4 (G02).

He left BMW in 2019 to become Head of Design at the Changan-NIO joint venture which later became Avatr, where he is the Chief Design Officer and Executive Vice President of Design. He was responsible for the design philosophy and the entire designs of the Avatr 11, Avatr 12, Avatr 07, and Avatr 06.
