= Avatr 06 =

Electric mid-size luxury sedan and wagon

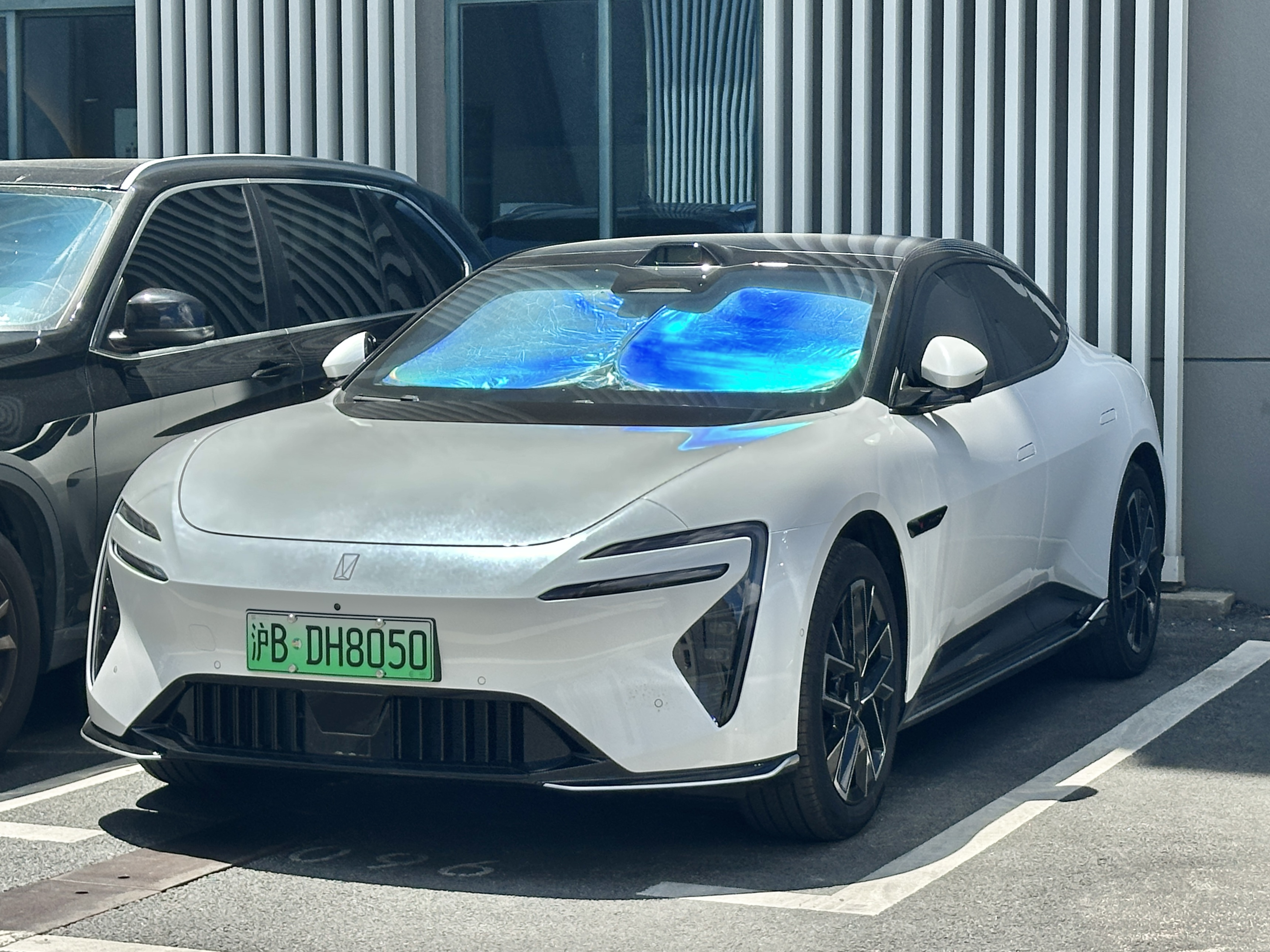

Overview
- Manufacturer: Avatr Technology
- Model code: E16
- Also called: Avatr 06T (wagon)
- Production: 2025–present
- Assembly: China: Chongqing
- Designer: Nader Faghihzadeh; Nicolas Guille

Body and chassis
- Class: Mid-size car (D)
- Body style: 4-door sedan; 5-door station wagon (06T)
- Layout: Battery electric: Rear-motor, rear-wheel drive; Dual-motor, all-wheel drive; Range-extended EV: Front engine, rear-motor, rear-wheel drive
- Platform: CHN platform
- Related: Avatr 07

Powertrain
- Engine: Gasoline range extender: 1.5 L JL469ZQ1 turbo I4
- Electric motor: PMSM (rear): 252 kW XTDM39, 231 kW ATDM01, 251 kW ATDM05, 185 kW ATDM06; Induction (front): 188 kW XYDM05, 210 kW AYDM03
- Power output: 231–370 kW (310–496 hp; 314–503 PS) (EREV); 252–712 kW (338–955 hp; 343–968 PS) (EV)
- Battery: 31.7 kWh Freevoy LFP CATL; 45.1 kWh Freevoy LFP CATL; 72.9 kWh Shenxing LFP CATL; 87.3 kWh Shenxing LFP CATL
- Range: 1,100 km (680 mi) (EREV)
- Electric range: 06 sedan: 170–240 km (106–149 mi) (EREV, CLTC); 610–650 km (379–404 mi) (EV, CLTC); 06T: 245 km (152 mi) (EREV, WLTP); 652–741 km (405–460 mi) (EV, CLTC)

Dimensions
- Wheelbase: 2,940 mm (116 in)
- Length: 4,855 mm (191.1 in); 4,940 mm (194 in) (06T)
- Width: 1,960 mm (77 in)
- Height: 1,450–1,467 mm (57.1–57.8 in); 1,475 mm (58.1 in) (06T)
- Curb weight: 2,120–2,320 kg (4,670–5,110 lb)

The Avatr 06 (Chinese: 阿维塔06; pinyin: Ā wéi tǎ 06) is a battery electric and range-extended mid-size sedan and station wagon produced by Avatr Technology, a joint venture between Changan Automobile and lithium-ion battery provider CATL. It is the fourth vehicle under the Avatr brand.

A station wagon variant marketed as the Avatr 06T went on sale in early 2026.

== Overview ==
Initial images and specifications of the 06 were revealed through public homologation documents on December 9, 2024. Additionally, Avatr unveiled exterior images of the vehicle online the same day. Pre-orders opened on March 27, 2025. Display models began arriving at stores a week earlier. It is related to the Avatr 07 SUV, which it shares its wheelbase and powertrains with.

The exterior of the 06 follows the 'Avatr 2.0' design language. The front of the vehicle features a lower air intake with active grille shutters, with a dual strip daytime running light design and headlights mounted in the lower corners. It has a 'Halo' LED display below the windshield, which can display customizable messages and images, including instructions to other road users. It has pop-out door handles, and the roof and pillars are painted black. The rear of the vehicle has long and narrow strip-shaped taillights, a lip spoiler, an illuminated logo, and lacks a rear window. The front doors are optionally power opening and closing with soft-close front and rear. The 06 is equipped with optional digital side mirrors and an optional roof mounted LiDAR sensor. All versions are equipped with either 20 or 21-inch wheels. There are six available exterior color options: smoke purple, scarlet red, obsidian black, obsidian grey, bright white, and cloud purple.

The interior features a two-tier dashboard design, with a 35.4-inch upper display serving as the instrument cluster and information display, configurable with a 15.6-inch lower touchscreen infotainment display, both running Huawei's HarmonyOS software. Vehicles equipped with the optional digital mirrors have two additional 6.7-inch mirror displays flanking the upper display. The steering wheel has a flattened octagonal shape and is upholstered in leather, while the spokes are finished in a contrasting metal; the shifter is located on the steering column.

The front seats have heating, ventilating, and massaging functions, bolstered headrests, an adjustable footrest, and a 'zero-gravity' recline mode. The second row seats have backrests that can recline up to 32-degrees and has 956 mm (37.6 in) of headroom. The cabin is upholstered in Nappa leather and microsuede, with metallic accents and speaker grilles. It has an optional 2016 W 25-speaker Meridian sound system with a 7.1.4 surround sound configuration, which also supports Huawei Audio features, with a 1408 W 16-speaker Meridian system standard. It has a nanometer-water droplet ionization system, which is claimed to offer sterilize and deodorize the air, moisturize skin, and reduce static charge. The interior is available in three color options: Deep Purple, two-tone Twilight Purple and Smoky White, and Dai Red. The 06 has a 70-litre (2.5 cu ft) frunk and a 416-litre (14.7 cu ft) rear cargo area with a 30-litre (1.1 cu ft) underfloor compartment, expanding to 1,266 litres (44.7 cu ft) with the rear seats folded down.

The 06 is equipped with single-chamber air suspension and continuous damping control, which allows for 45 mm (1.8 in) of ride height adjustment. It uses a double wishbone design on the front wheels, and a multi-link independent suspension at the rear. It also has access to Huawei's Qiankun ADS 3.0 ADAS system, which uses a 27-sensor suite including a 192-line roof-mounted LiDAR. It is capable of supervised autonomous driving in urban and highway conditions and unmanned parking, and its auto-emergency braking system is effective at up to 120 km/h (75 mph). Base versions get the Qiankun ADS 3.0 SE, a vision-only version which relies on camera sensors rather than LiDAR and is capable of supervised autonomous driving on highways only. Avatr claims that the 06 passes the Euro NCAP 2026 50% overlap frontal crash test after a demonstration at a CATARC facility in Tianjin.

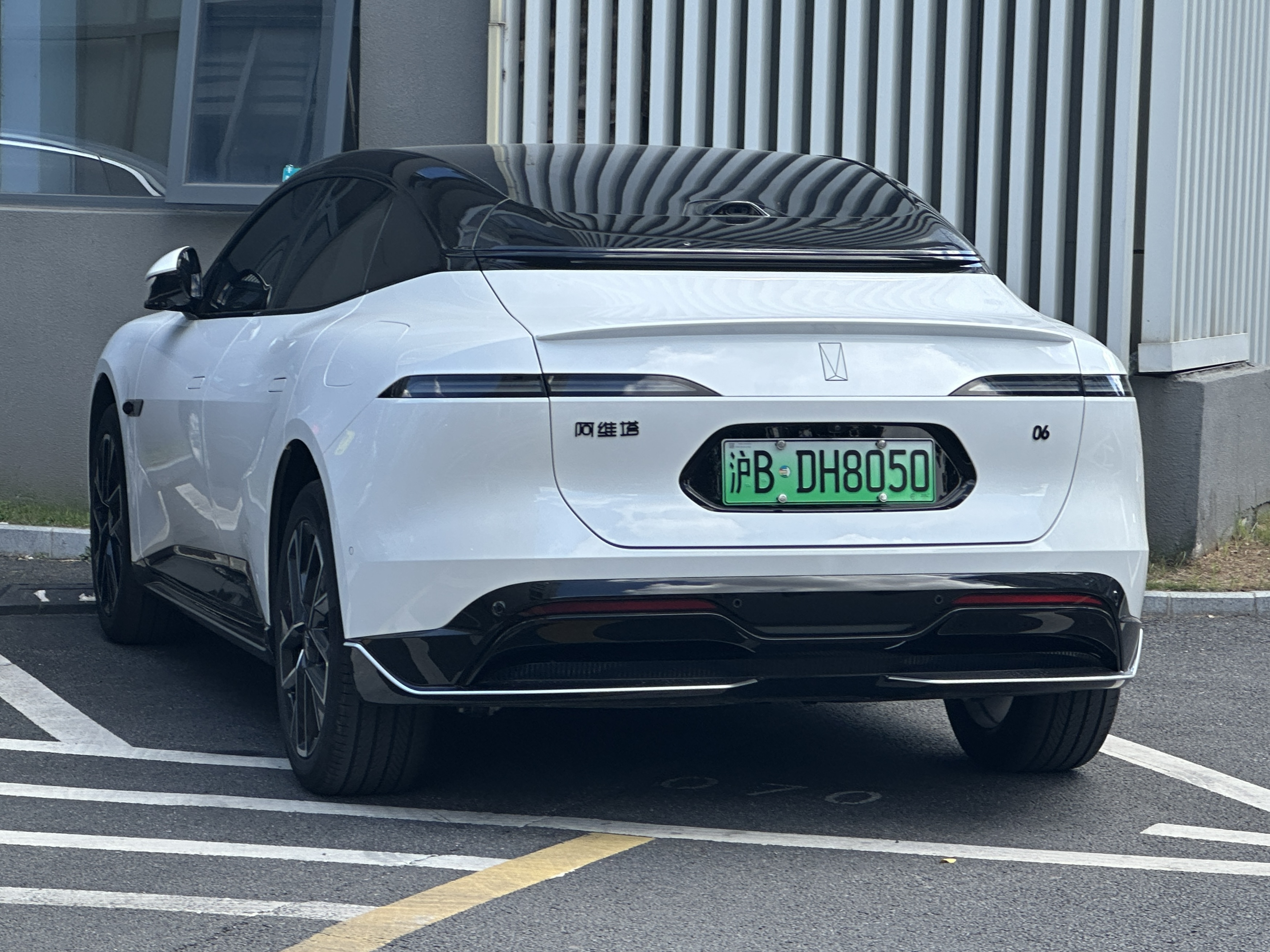
Rear view

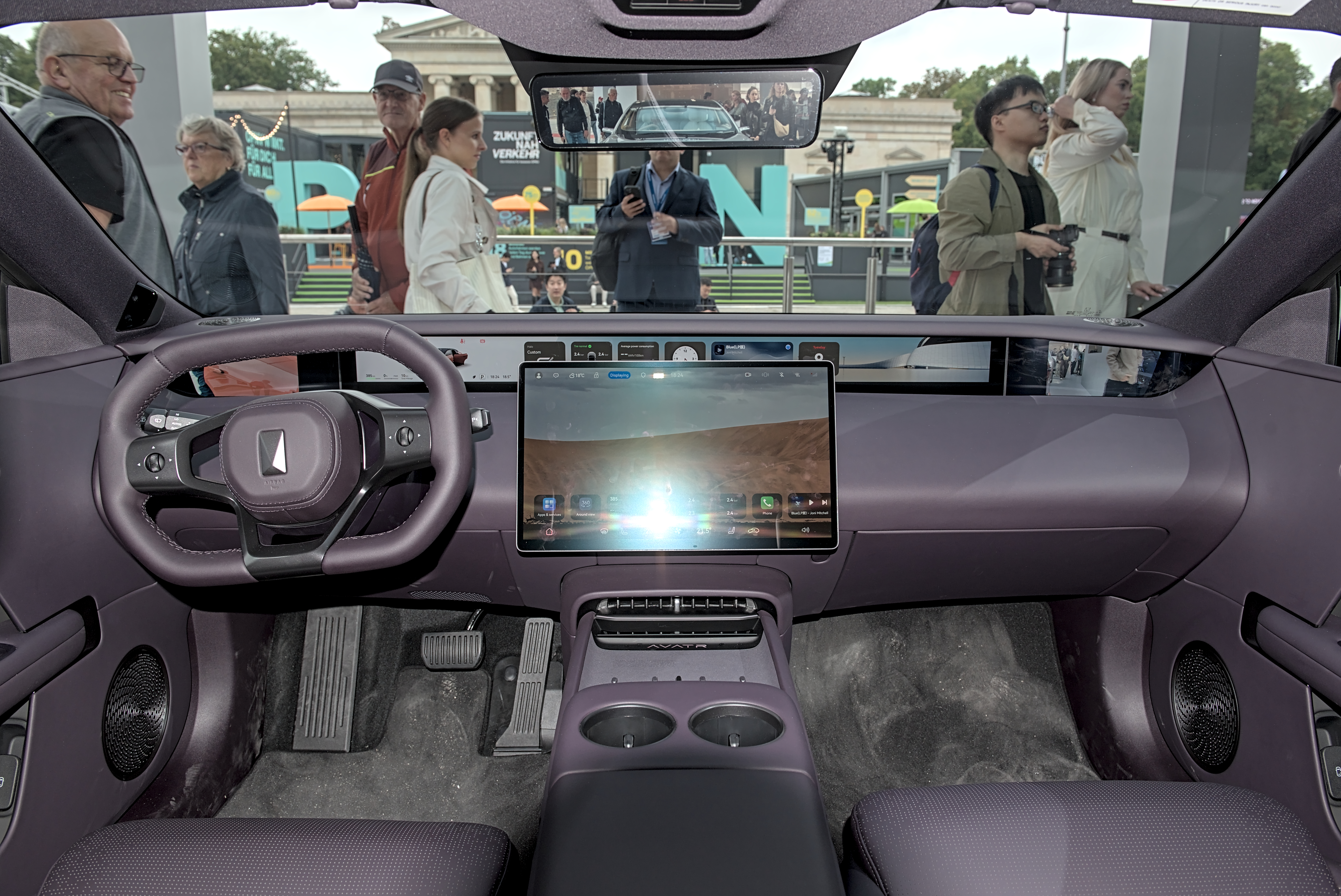
Interior

=== 2026 update ===
For 2027, Avatr cuts the 06 sedan down to two powertrain variants, updated the ADAS system, and removed some options and features. The retracting style exterior door handles have been replaced by pocket style handles, and the interior mechanical backup door handles have been revised to comply with new Chinese safety regulations. The ADAS system has been upgraded to the Qiankun ADS 5 Max system, which retains the 192-line roof-mounted LiDAR but upgrades the three 4D mmWave radars. In addition to general improvements to the software architecture, it is now capable of roaming cruise assist (RCA) and direct navigation to charging parking spaces.

The front zero-gravity seats and power legrests have been made optional, and features such as the air suspension with adaptive dampers, second-row heated seats, cabin fragrance system, exterior Halo LED display, and optional 25-speaker sound system have been removed.

The powertrain configurations have been simplified, as the larger battery for the range extender and the battery electric all-wheel drive variant have been discontinued. Listed battery capacities for the remaining two models increased marginally, but range ratings and charging speeds remain unchanged.

== Avatr 06T ==
The station wagon version of the 06 was teased on February 3, 2026, with the name of the station wagon version being confirmed as the 06T on the same day. On February 5, Avatr unveiled exterior images of the vehicle online the same day. Spyshots of the 06T previously surfaced in November 2025. Pre-sales of the vehicle opened on 8 April 2026.

The 06T receives the 2026 update earlier than the 06 sedan, but is largely similar apart from the obvious changes to the rear, with minor changes to the exterior including a sporty body kit consisting of splitters and side skirts with chrome accent trim, pocket-style door handles replacing the sedan's retracting handles, teal autonomous driving indicator lights, and the addition of roof rails.

The second row seats are available with heating, ventilation, and massaging functions. The 06T features 517 L (18.3 cu ft) of trunk volume and one-touch power folding rear seats, which Avatr says provides a 2.15-metre (7.1 ft) deep cargo area.

It uses the latest Huawei Qiankun ADS 5 Max ADAS system, which features a 896-line roof-mounted LiDAR sensor.

It uses a unique drivetrain compared to the sedan version, as all versions uses Avatr's Taihang dual rear-motor system and have access to larger battery pack options.

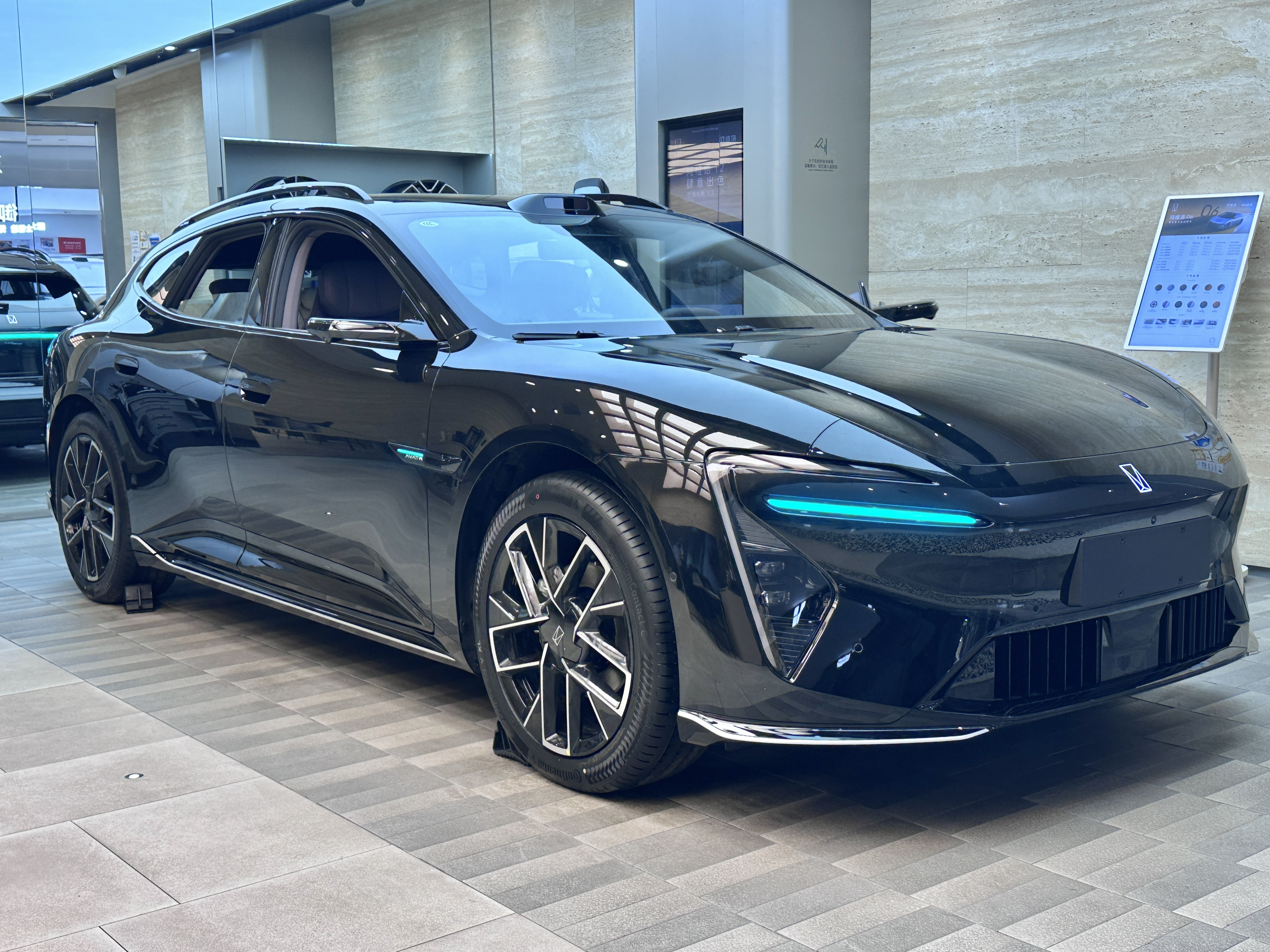
Avatr 06T

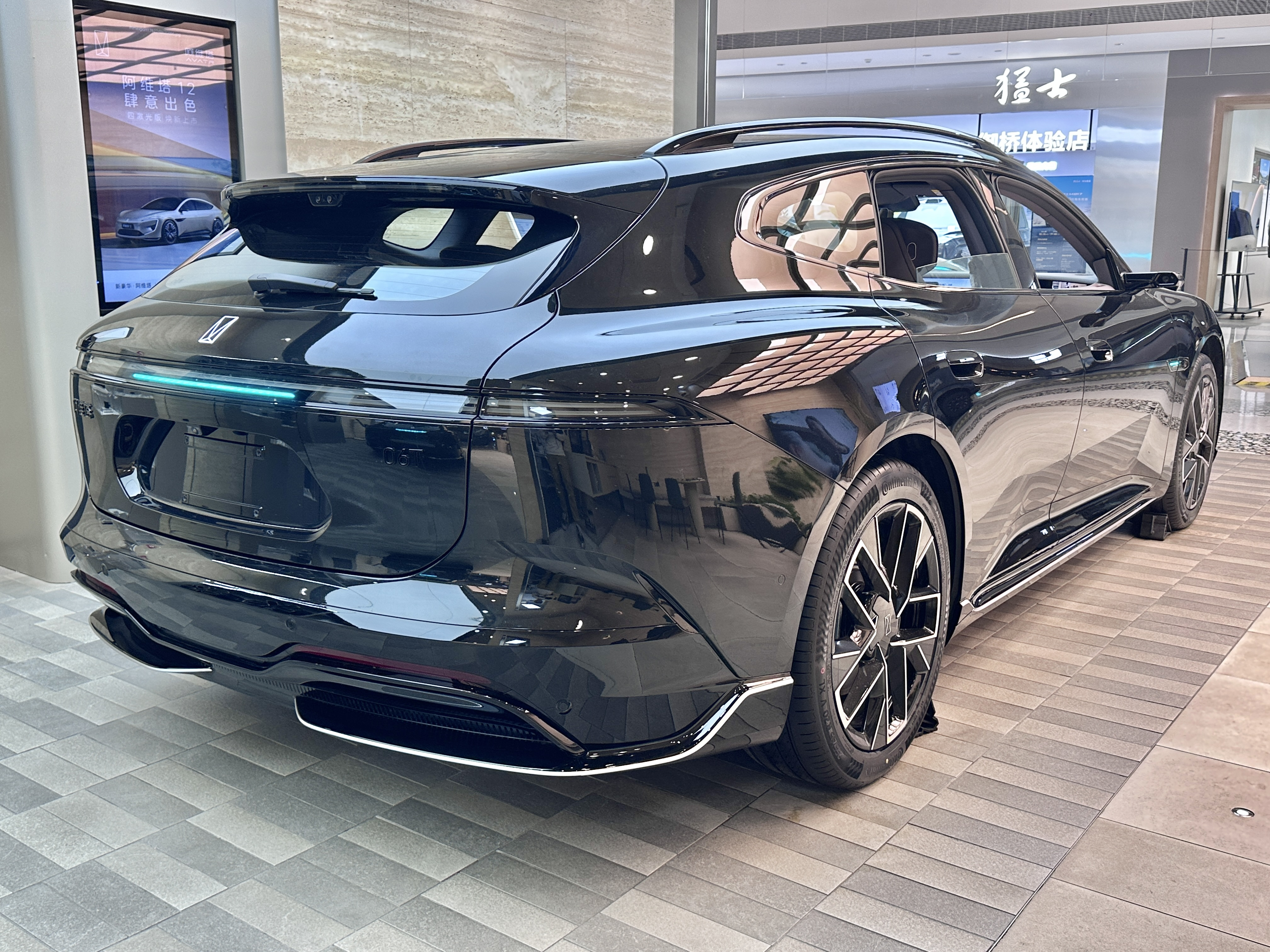
Rear

== Powertrain ==
The 06 sedan's powertrain is closely related to the Avatr 07. There are three powertrain options available, two battery electric configurations and one range extender electric option. All versions utilize CATL-supplied LFP battery packs, and use electric motors supplied by Huawei.

All fully electric versions of the 06 use a 72.9 kWh battery and a 800V electrical architecture, along with a 252 kW (338 hp; 343 PS) motor that powers the rear wheels. All-wheel drive variants have an additional 188 kW (252 hp; 256 PS) motor powering the front wheels, for a total of 440 kW (590 hp; 598 PS). Rear-wheel drive models have a CLTC range rating of 650 kilometres (404 mi) while all-wheel drive variants achieve 610 kilometres (379 mi). The battery can gain up to 400 kilometres (250 mi) of range with 10 minutes of DC fast charging. The rear and all-wheel drive versions weigh 2,210 kg (4,870 lb) and 2,320 kg (5,110 lb) respectively, and both have a top speed of 200 kilometres per hour (120 mph).

Avatr's Kunlun range extender powertrain is only offered with a single-motor rear-wheel drive configuration producing 231 kW (310 hp; 314 PS) and equipped with a choice of either a 31.7 kWh or 45.1 kWh battery pack. It is equipped with a Changan-supplied 1.5-liter turbocharged gasoline engine codenamed JL469ZQ1 which produces 115 kW (154 hp; 156 PS) and does not mechanically drive the wheels, instead powering a generator. The engine has a compression ratio of 15.1:1, allowing for a thermal efficiency of 44.4% or 3.63 kWh/L of 92-RON petrol. Avatr claims that the engine doesn't exceed 75 dB of noise during operation, and engine vibration during startup is reduced by 90% by placing the engine's cylinders in an optimal position during shutdown. It has an all-electric CLTC range rating of 230–330 kilometres (140–210 mi), with total range of about 1,100 kilometres (680 mi). It weighs 2,120 kg (4,670 lb) and has a top speed of 190 kilometres per hour (118 mph).

For the 06's 2026 update, the range extender's 45.06 kWh battery option has been discontinued along with the pure electric all-wheel drive variant. The battery capacity for the remaining range extender variant is listed as 32.3 kWh and 75.46 kWh for the pure electric model, but other specifications along with range ratings and charging speed remain unchanged to previous versions.

=== 06T ===
All variants of the 06T use Avatr's Taihang drivetrain system, which uses individual motors to power each rear wheel, and all battery packs are CATL-supplied using LFP cells.

All battery electric variants variants are equipped with dual 251 kW rear motors individually driving each wheel outputting 604 hp (450 kW; 612 PS) and 750 N⋅m (553 lb⋅ft) of torque when paired with the smaller 75.46 kWh battery providing a CLTC range of 652 kilometres (405 mi); power rises to 673 hp (502 kW; 682 PS) with the larger 89.33 kWh battery with 741 kilometres (460 mi) of CLTC range. The all-wheel drive variant is available with the larger battery and adds an induction motor to the front axle outputting 282 hp (210 kW; 286 PS) and 246 N⋅m (181 lb⋅ft) of torque for a combined output of 955 hp (712 kW; 968 PS) and 996 N⋅m (735 lb⋅ft) of torque, and 680 kilometres (423 mi) of CLTC range. Both battery packs use CATL's Shenxing technology and can recharge from 30–80% in 10 minutes. All variants have a top speed of 240 kilometres per hour (149 mph).

The range extender variant uses the same Kunlun range extender system as the sedan, but uses a pair of 185 kW rear motors driving each wheel for a total output of 496 hp (370 kW; 503 PS) and 690 N⋅m (509 lb⋅ft) of torque. It uses a 45.65 kWh Freevoy battery pack which provides 245 kilometres (152 mi) of WLTP pure electric range and can recharge from 30–80% in 10 minutes. It has a 45-liter (11.9 U.S. gal) fuel tank providing a combined CLTC range of 1,250 kilometres (777 mi) and a top speed of 240 km/h (149 mph).

Specifications
Model	Year	Battery		Motor		Power	Torque	30–80% charge time	Electric range		0–100 km/h (62 mph)	Kerb weight
Model	Year	Type	Weight	Front	Rear	Power	Torque	30–80% charge time	WLTP	CLTC	0–100 km/h (62 mph)	Kerb weight
EREV
06	2025–present	31.7 kWh (32.3 kWh gross) LFP CATL Freevoy	270 kg (595 lb)	—	231 kW ATDM01 PMSM	310 hp (231 kW; 314 PS)	367 N⋅m (271 lb⋅ft)	15 min	170 km (106 mi)	230 km (143 mi)	6.6 s	2,120 kg (4,674 lb)
06	2025–26	45.06 kWh (46.65 kWh gross) LFP CATL Freevoy	353 kg (778 lb)	—	231 kW ATDM01 PMSM	310 hp (231 kW; 314 PS)	367 N⋅m (271 lb⋅ft)	10 min	240 km (149 mi)	330 km (205 mi)	6.9 s	2,220 kg (4,894 lb)
06T	2026–present	45.06 kWh (46.65 kWh gross) LFP CATL Freevoy	353 kg (778 lb)	—	2×185 kW ATDM06 PMSM	496 hp (370 kW; 503 PS)	690 N⋅m (509 lb⋅ft)	10 min	245 km (152 mi)	330 km (205 mi)	4.47 s	2,255 kg (4,971 lb)
EV
06	2025–present	72.88 kWh (75.46 kWh gross) LFP CATL Shenxing	574 kg (1,265 lb)	—	252 kW XTDM39 PMSM	338 hp (252 kW; 343 PS)	365 N⋅m (269 lb⋅ft)	10 min	—	650 km (404 mi)	6.1 s	2,210 kg (4,872 lb)
06 AWD	2025–26	72.88 kWh (75.46 kWh gross) LFP CATL Shenxing	574 kg (1,265 lb)	188 kW XTDM05 induction	252 kW XTDM39 PMSM	590 hp (440 kW; 598 PS)	645 N⋅m (476 lb⋅ft)	10 min	—	600 km (373 mi)	3.9 s	2,320 kg (5,115 lb)
06T RWD	2026–present	72.88 kWh (75.46 kWh gross) LFP CATL Shenxing	574 kg (1,265 lb)	—	2×251 kW ATDM05 PMSM	604 hp (450 kW; 612 PS)	750 N⋅m (553 lb⋅ft)	10 min	—	652 km (405 mi)	3.74 s	2,200 kg (4,850 lb)
06T RWD	2026–present	87.301 kWh (89.33 kWh gross) LFP CATL Shenxing	642 kg (1,415 lb)	—	2×251 kW ATDM05 PMSM	673 hp (502 kW; 682 PS)	750 N⋅m (553 lb⋅ft)	10 min	—	741 km (460 mi)	3.85 s	2,280 kg (5,027 lb)
06T AWD	2026–present	87.301 kWh (89.33 kWh gross) LFP CATL Shenxing	642 kg (1,415 lb)	210 kW AYDM03 induction	2×251 kW ATDM05 PMSM	955 hp (712 kW; 968 PS)	996 N⋅m (735 lb⋅ft)	10 min	—	680 km (423 mi)	2.78 s	2,385 kg (5,258 lb)

== Sales ==
After pre-orders opened on March 27, 2025, the 06 received 20,117 orders within 26 hours.

Year	China		
Year	EV	EREV	Total
2025	21,616	10,742	32,358
