= Dongfeng Nissan =

Chinese automobile manufacturing company

Dongfeng Motor Company Limited
- Type: Joint venture
- Industry: Automotive
- Founded: Shiyan, Hubei, China; 9 June 2003; 23 years ago
- Founder: Dongfeng Motor Group; Nissan
- Headquarters: Wuhan, Hubei, China
- Key people: Daisuke Koike (CEO)
- Products: Automobiles
- Production output: ▲1,501,562 (2017)
- Revenue: ▲CN¥169.144 billion (2017)
- Net income: ▲CN¥13.860 billion (2017)
- Total assets: ▲CN¥141.409 billion (2017)
- Total equity: ▼CN¥41.256 billion (2017)
Owner
Dongfeng Motor Group	(50%)
Nissan	(50%)
- Number of employees: Approximately 70,000
- Subsidiaries: Dongfeng Automobile Company

Chinese name
- Simplified Chinese: 东风汽车有限公司
- Traditional Chinese: 東風汽車有限公司
- Literal meaning: Dongfeng Motor Company Limited
Transcriptions
Standard Mandarin
- Hanyu Pinyin: Dōngfēng Qìchē Yǒuxiàn Gōngsī
- Wade–Giles: Tung^{1}-feng^{1} Ch'i^{4}-Ch'e^{1} Yuh^{3}-sien^{4} Kung^{1}-szu^{1}
- Website: www.dongfeng-nissan.com.cn
- Footnotes; Figures obtained from Dongfeng Motor Group's annual report; DFL's annual report was not disclosed; production volume included subsidiaries

Dongfeng Motor Company Limited (abb. DFL), most commonly known in English-language sources as Dongfeng Nissan, (Note: In Chinese sources, Dongfeng Nissan (Chinese: 东风日产) most commonly refers to Dongfeng Nissan Passenger Vehicle Company, a DFL subsidiary.) is a Chinese automobile manufacturing company headquartered in Wuhan, Hubei. It is a 50–50 joint-venture between Dongfeng Motor Group and Nissan Motors. It produces passenger cars under the Nissan marque and commercial vehicles under the Dongfeng marque.

== Name ==
Dongfeng Motor Corporation (Chinese: 东风汽车集团有限公司 and previously 东风汽车公司) is a separate legal entity from Dongfeng Motor Co., Ltd. (东风汽车有限公司). Dongfeng Motor Corporation is a Chinese, state-owned automaker while Dongfeng Motor Co., Ltd. is a joint venture between Dongfeng Motor Group (东风汽车集团股份有限公司) (Note: Also used the Chinese name 东风汽车有限公司 before the formation of the current Dongfeng Motor Co., Ltd.) and Nissan. Dongfeng Motor Co., Ltd. had a subsidiary Dongfeng Automobile Co., Ltd. (DFAC, 东风汽车股份有限公司) which also had a similar name with Dongfeng Motor Co., Ltd..

As of 2011, according to Reuters, about 68% of Dongfeng Motor Group products were connected to Nissan, and, as of 2006, the company was being referred to as "the biggest Sino-foreign vehicle joint venture".

== History ==
Dongfeng Motor Co., Ltd. (DFL) was formally established on 9 June 2003 and began operations on 1 July 2003. Initially headquartered in Shiyan, it moved closer to its Chinese parent relocating to Wuhan in June, 2006.

In September 2010, DFL unveiled a new automobile marque, Venucia (Chinese: 启辰; pinyin: Qǐ Chén), to sell vehicles tailored specifically for second- and third-tier Chinese cities in the poorer interior of the country.

In 2011, a roadmap for additional investment in Dongfeng Motor Co., Ltd. by its Japanese and Chinese parents was drawn up as part of a plan to boost annual sales from around 1.3 million vehicles in 2010 to over 2.3 million by 2015. In April 2012, it was announced that Dongfeng Motor Co., Ltd. would begin manufacturing models from the range of Nissan's luxury marque, Infiniti, beginning in 2014.

In 2017, the majority stake of Zhengzhou Nissan was acquired from the listed subsidiaries Dongfeng Automobile Company for CN¥788 million.

=== Production bases and facilities ===
As of 2006, the company reportedly had factories in Hubei, Guangdong, the Guangxi Zhuang Autonomous Region, the Xinjiang Uygur Autonomous Region, and Zhejiang.

As of 2015, a subsidiary, Dongfeng Nissan Passenger Vehicle Company, is listed as having a R&D center as well as a variety of factories including sites in: Dalian, Huadu, Xiangyang, and Zhengzhou. The Dalian location may be the same site that was in the planning stages as of 2012 and slated to produce Nissan-branded automobiles.

A corporate campus and design center in Huadu, Guangzhou, was announced in 2017. In 2018, Dongfeng Motor's overall sales volume reached 1.547 million vehicles, a year-on-year increase of 3.9%.

In November 2024, Dongfeng Nissan and Huawei signed a strategic cooperation agreement. The two parties will build a new car's intelligent cockpit system based on the HI model, making Dongfeng Nissan the first Sino-foreign joint venture automaker to cooperate with Huawei.

== Leadership ==
- Katsumi Nakamura (2003–2008)
- Kimiyasu Nakamura (2008–2013)
- Jun Seki (2014–2019)
- Makoto Uchida (2019)
- Daisuke Koike (2019–2026)
- Isao Sekiguchi (2026–present)

== Subsidiaries ==
As of 28 December 2020, DFL had the following subsidiaries:

- Dongfeng Automobile Company (60.1%)
- Dongfeng Nissan Passenger Vehicle Company
- Zhengzhou Nissan Automobile Company
- Dongfeng Infiniti Motor Company
- Dongfeng Motor Parts and Components Group Company

== Dongfeng Nissan ==
=== Products ===
- Nissan Tiida
- Nissan Altima
- Nissan Teana
- Nissan N6
- Nissan N7
- Nissan NX7
- Nissan NX8
- Nissan Sylphy
- Nissan Ariya
- Nissan Kicks
- Nissan Pathfinder
- Nissan Qashqai
- Nissan X-Trail
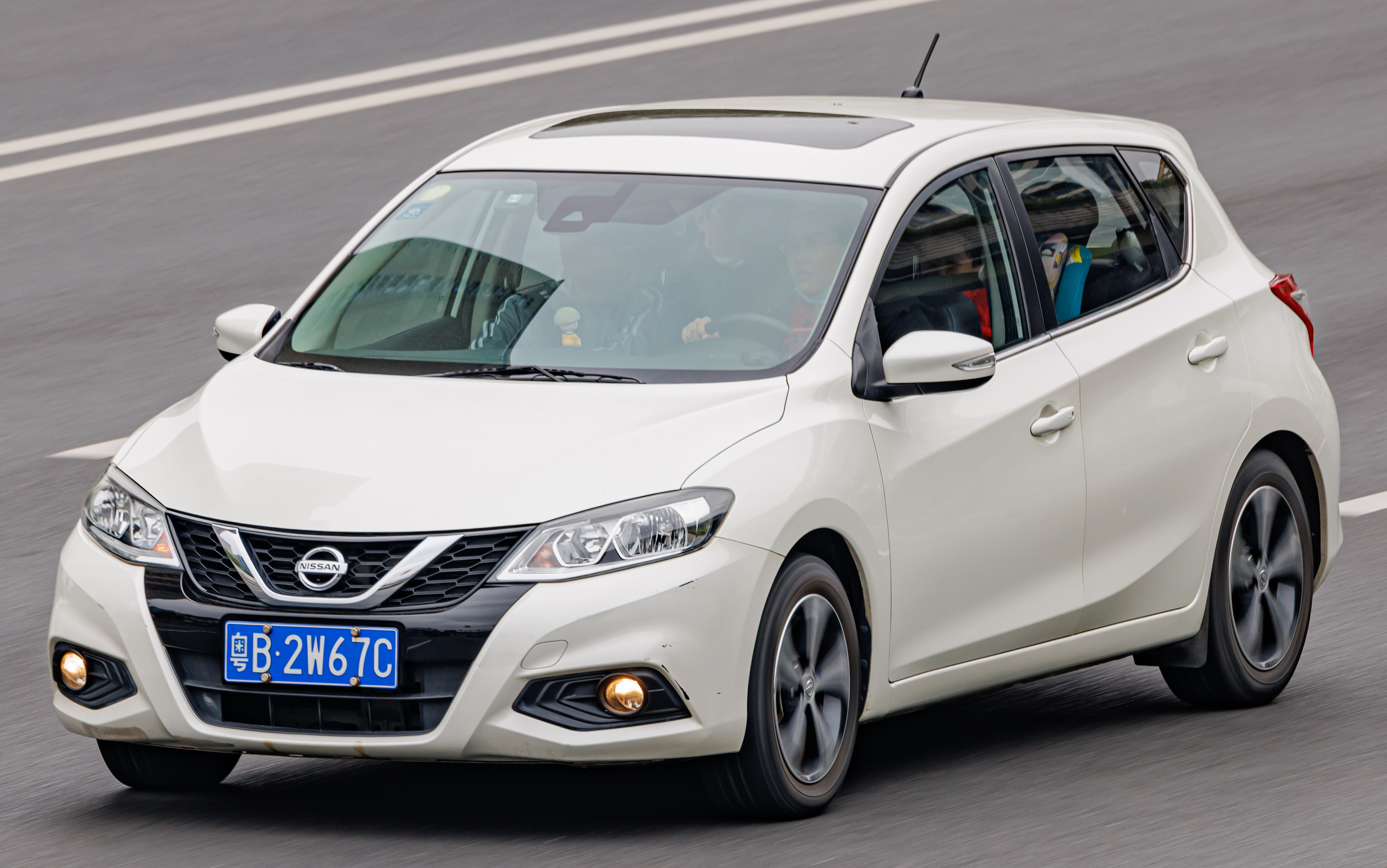
Nissan Tiida

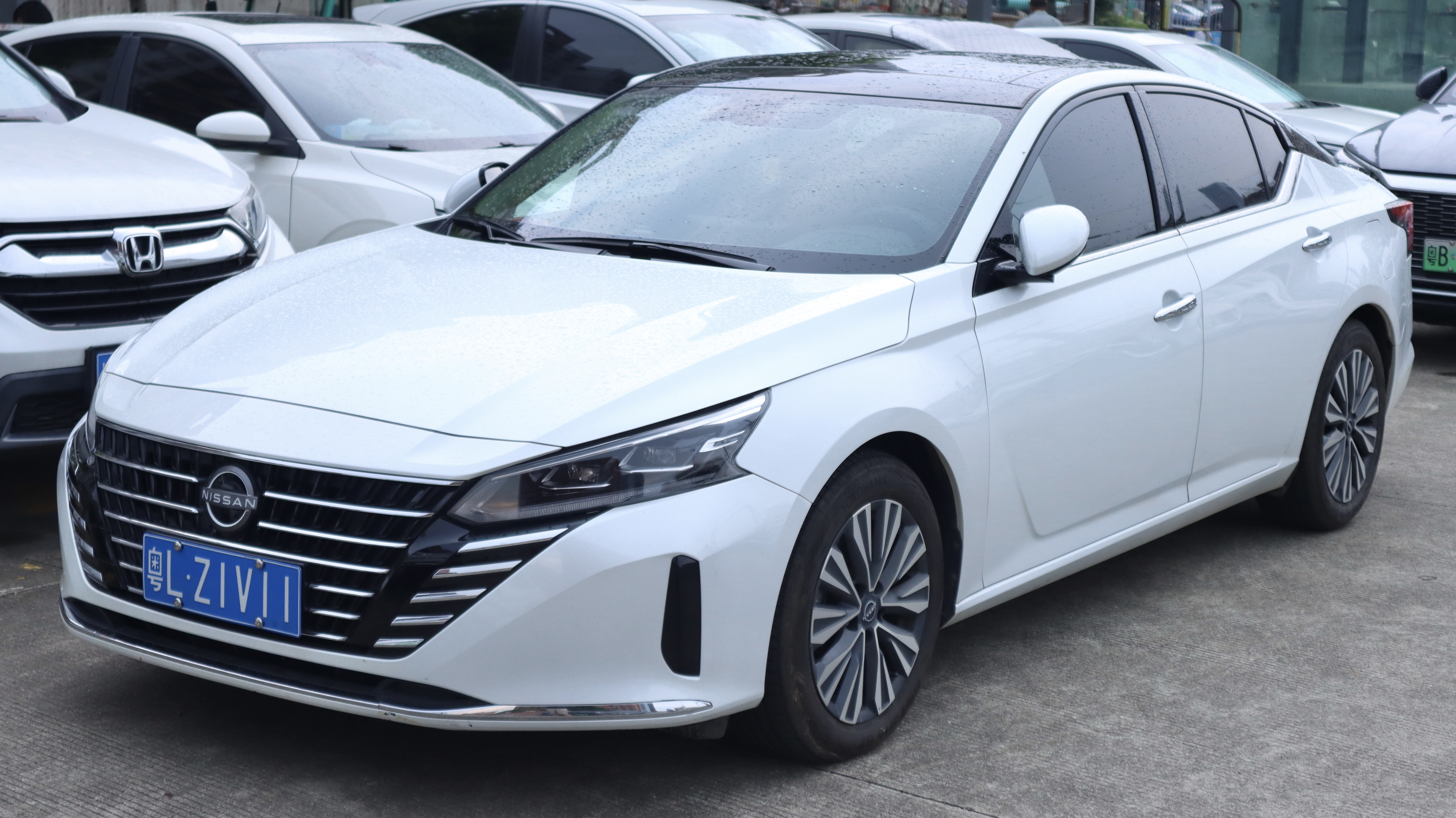
Nissan Altima

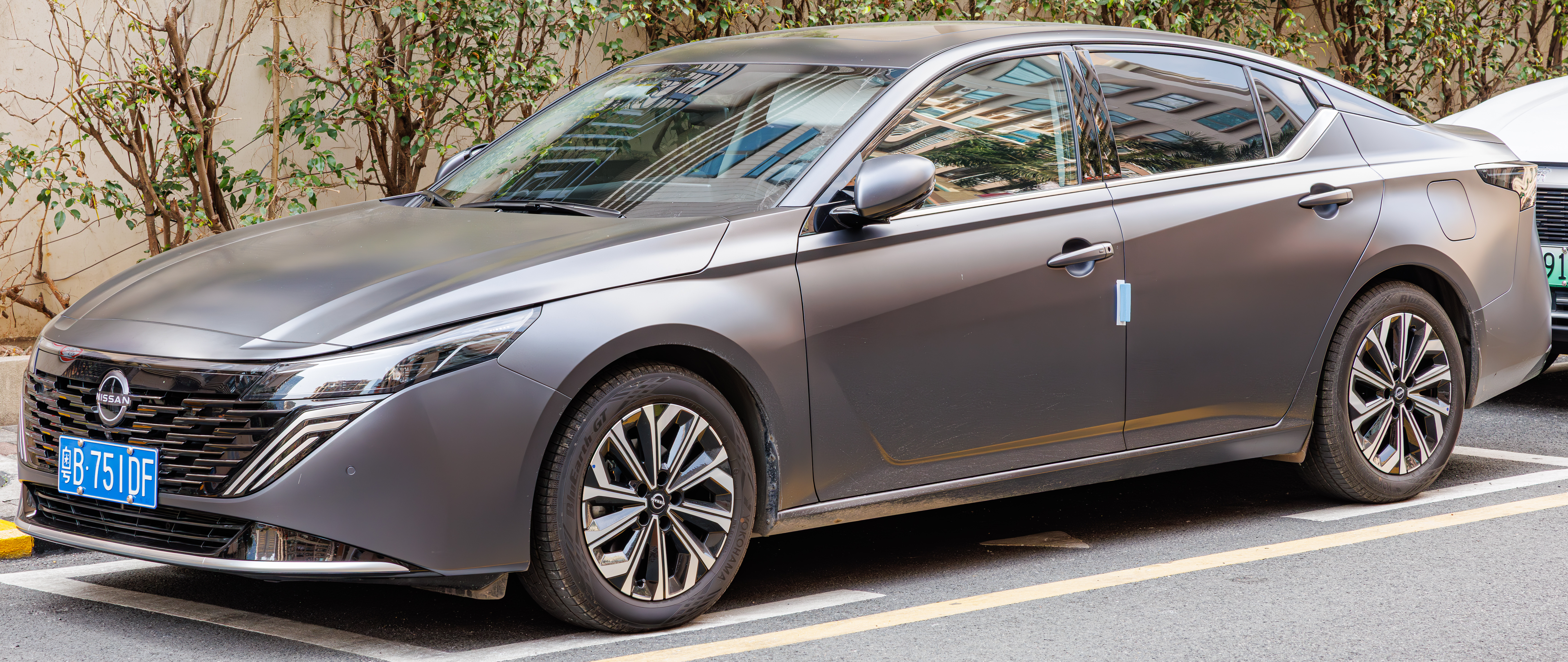
Nissan Teana

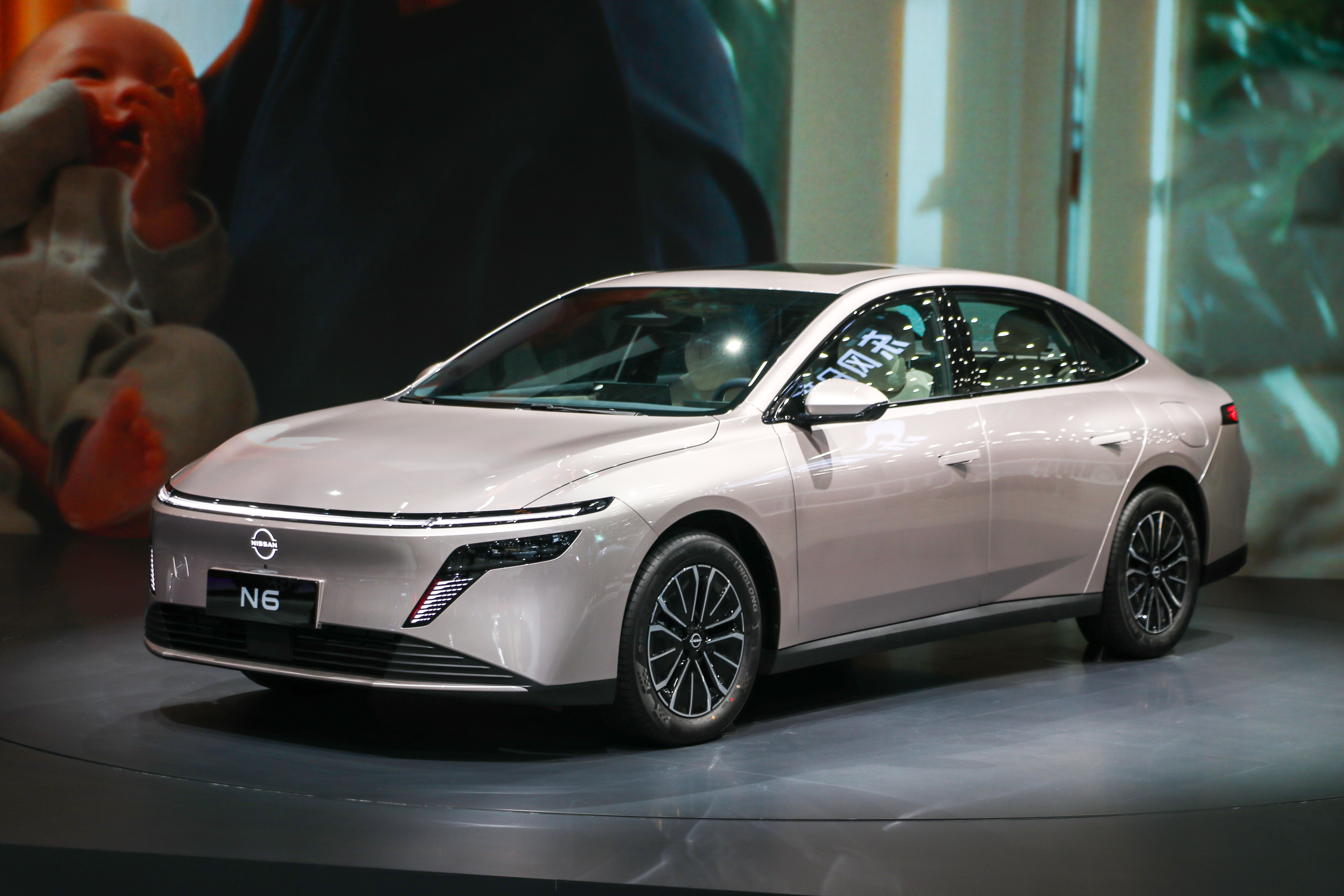
Nissan N6

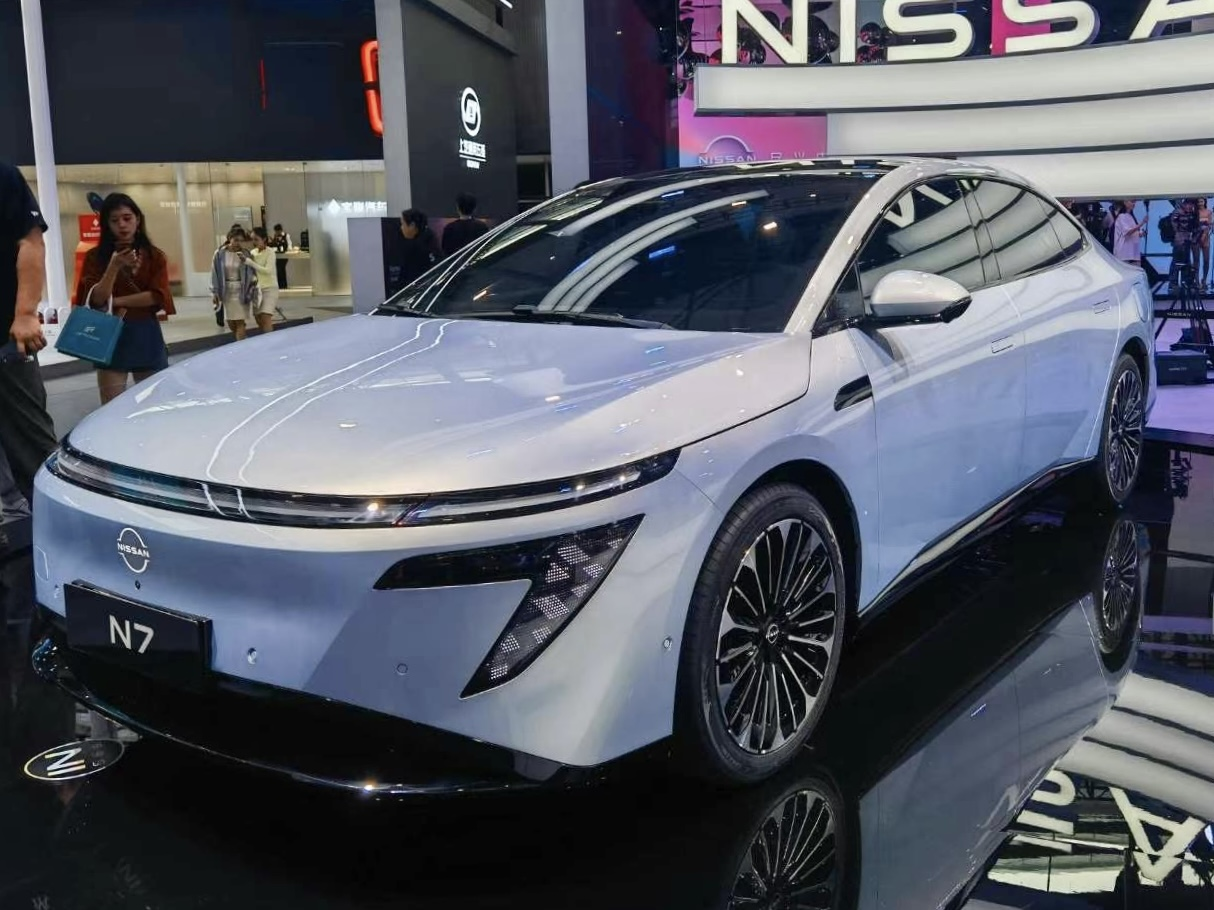
Nissan N7

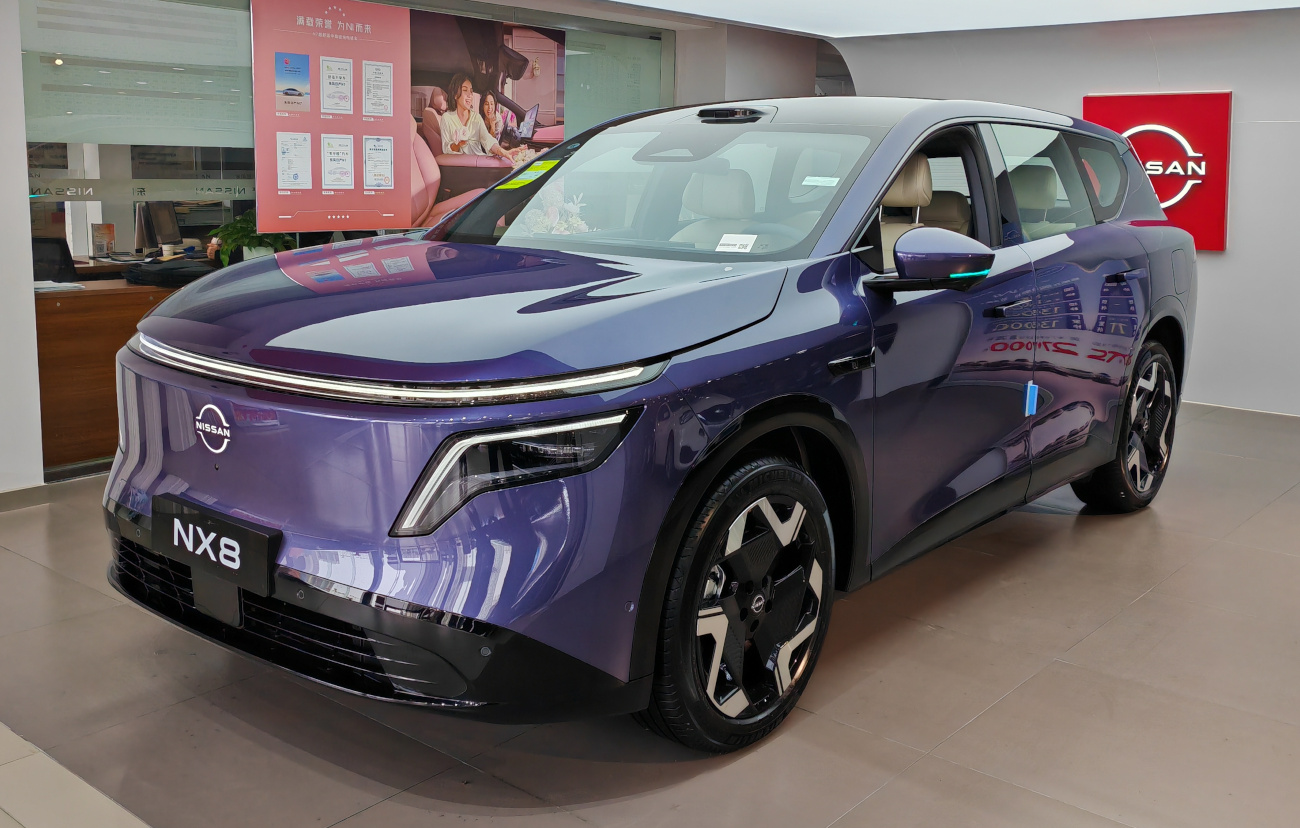
Nissan NX8

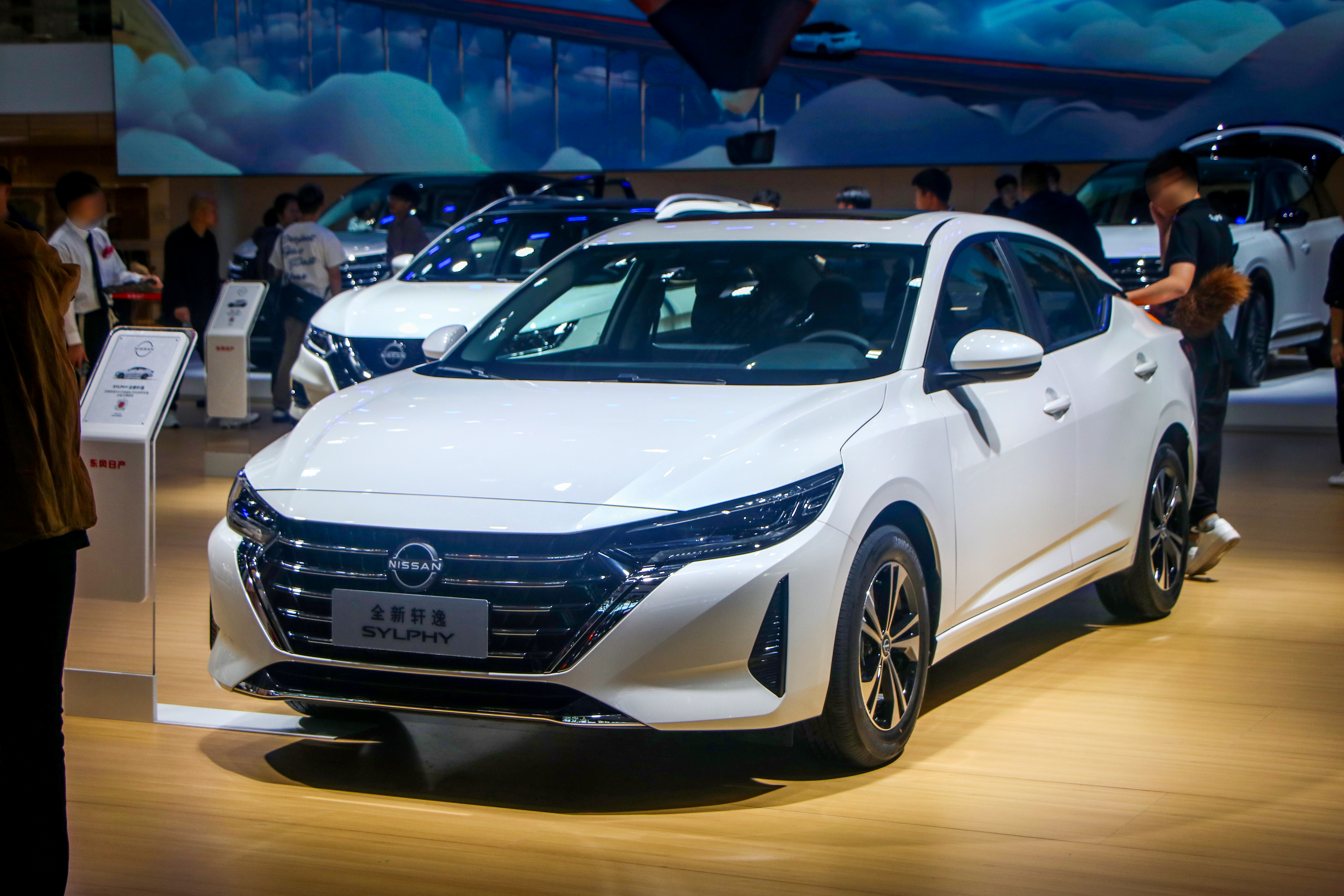
Nissan Sylphy

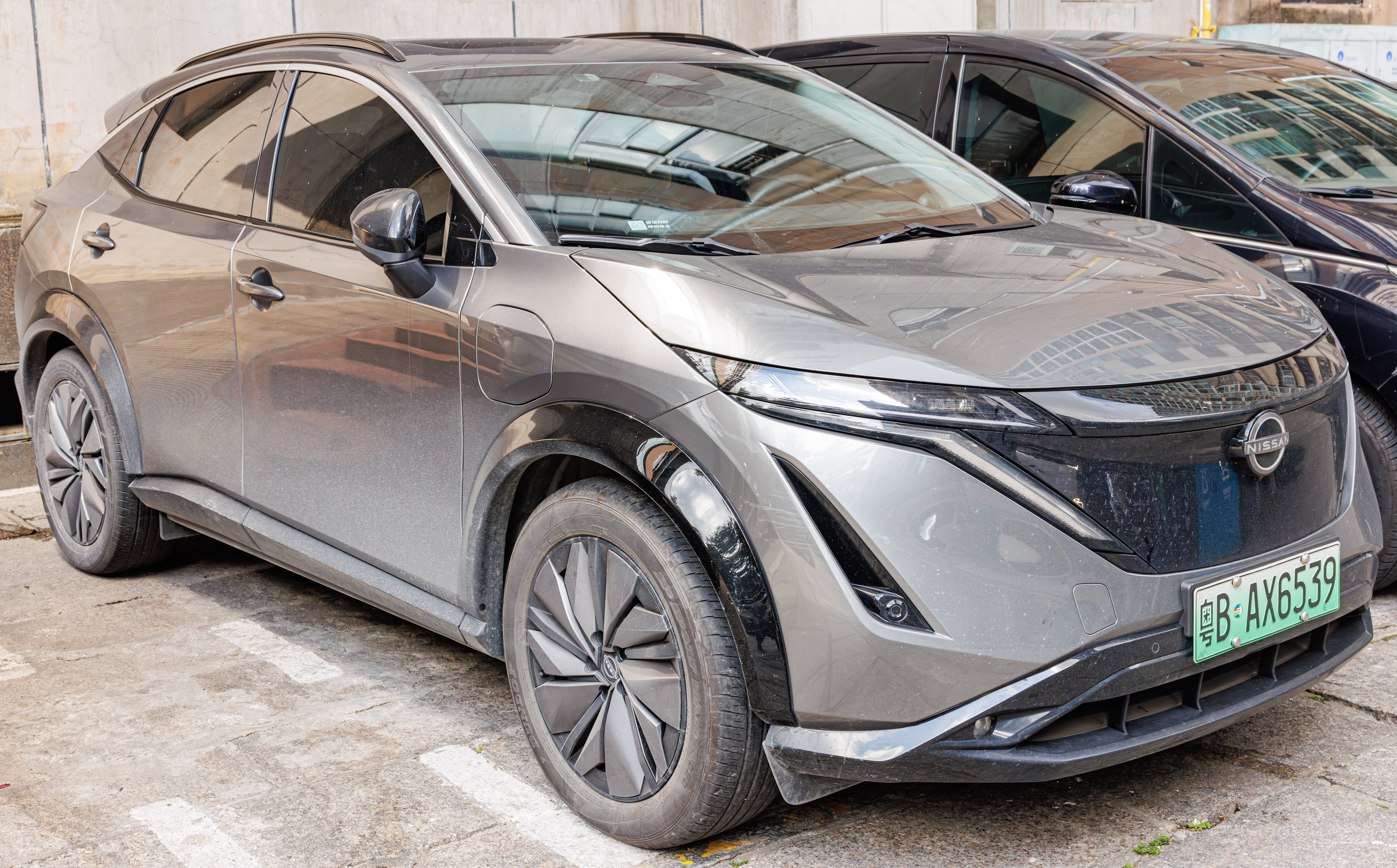
Nissan Ariya

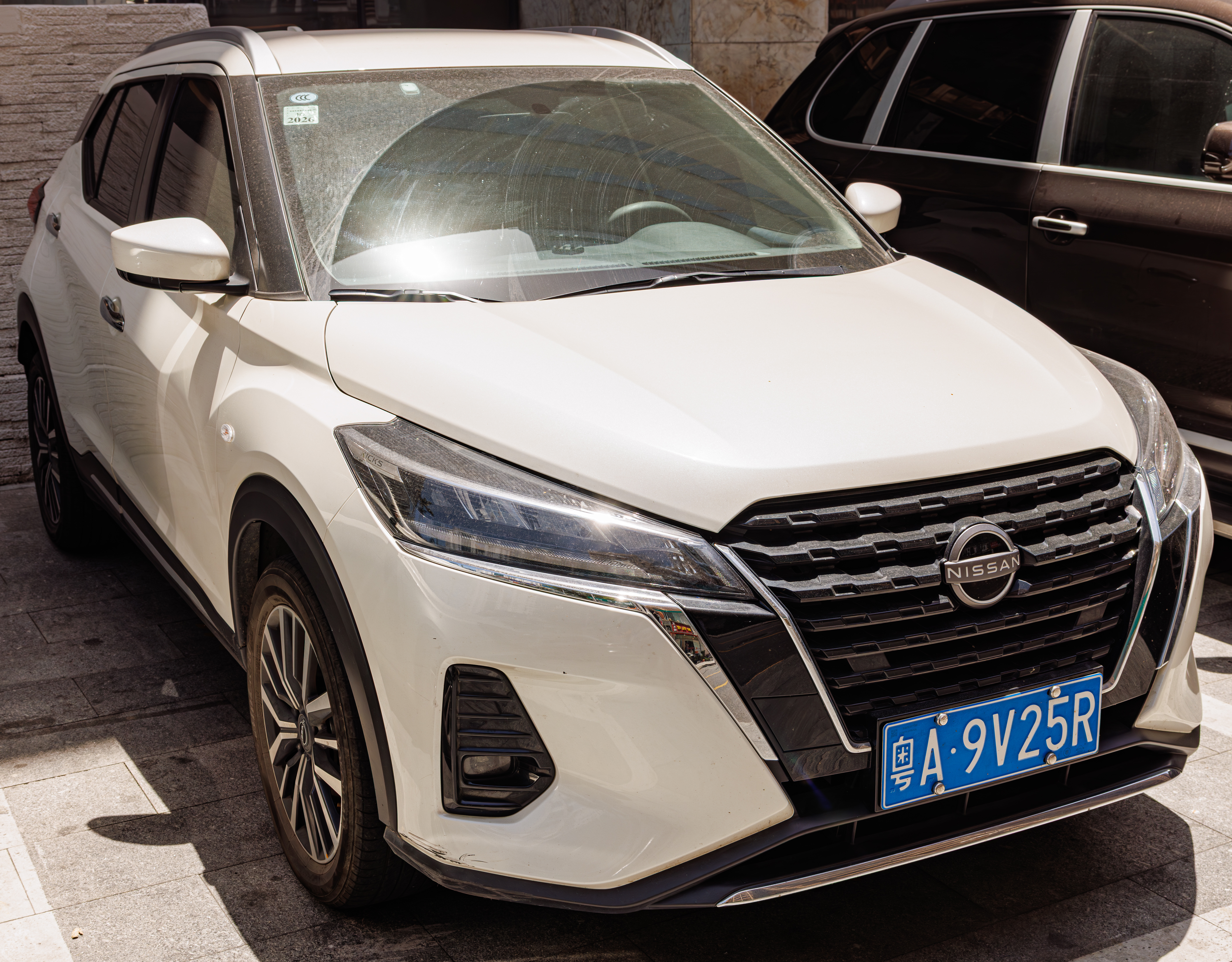
Nissan Kicks

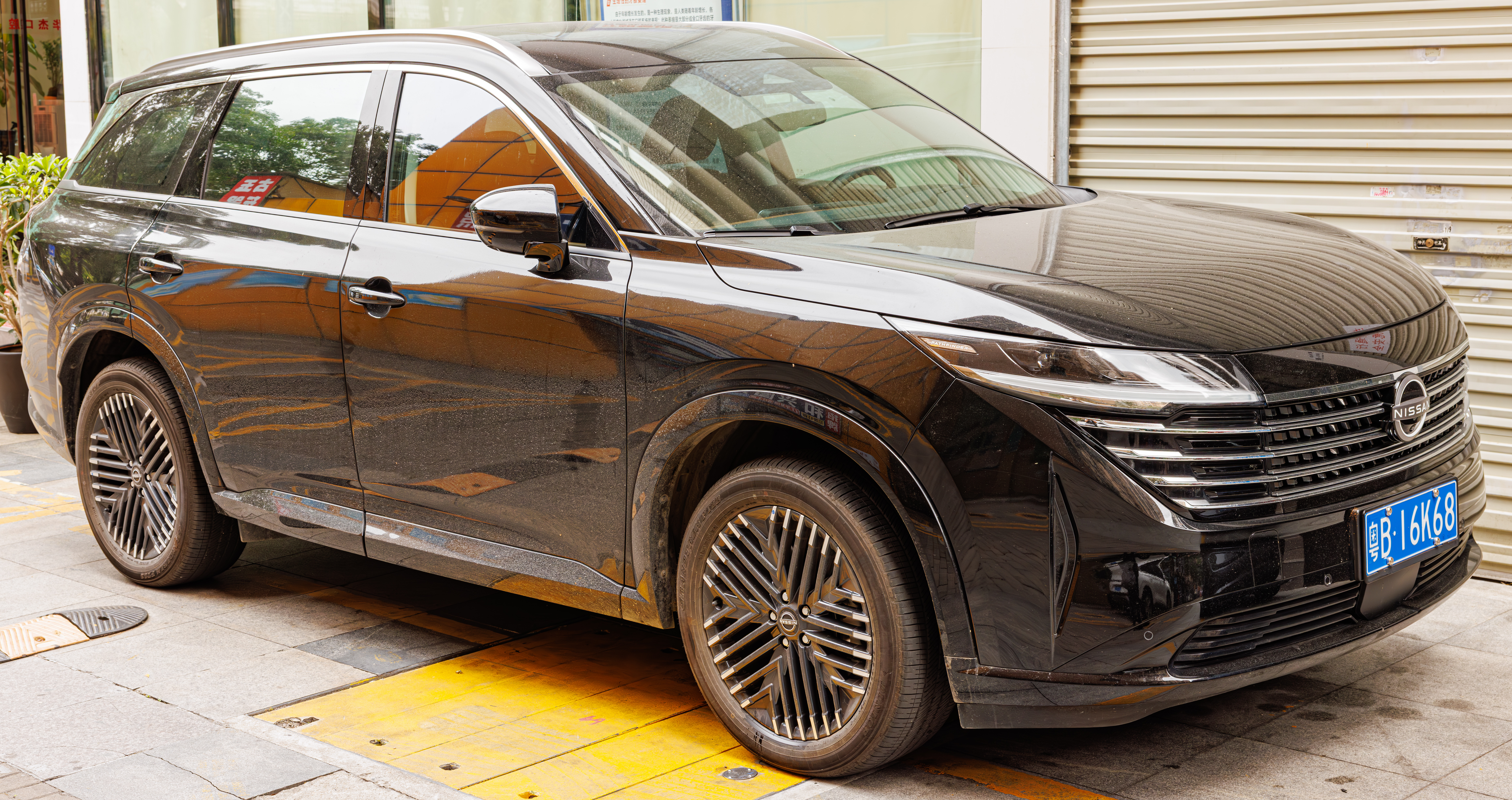
Nissan Pathfinder

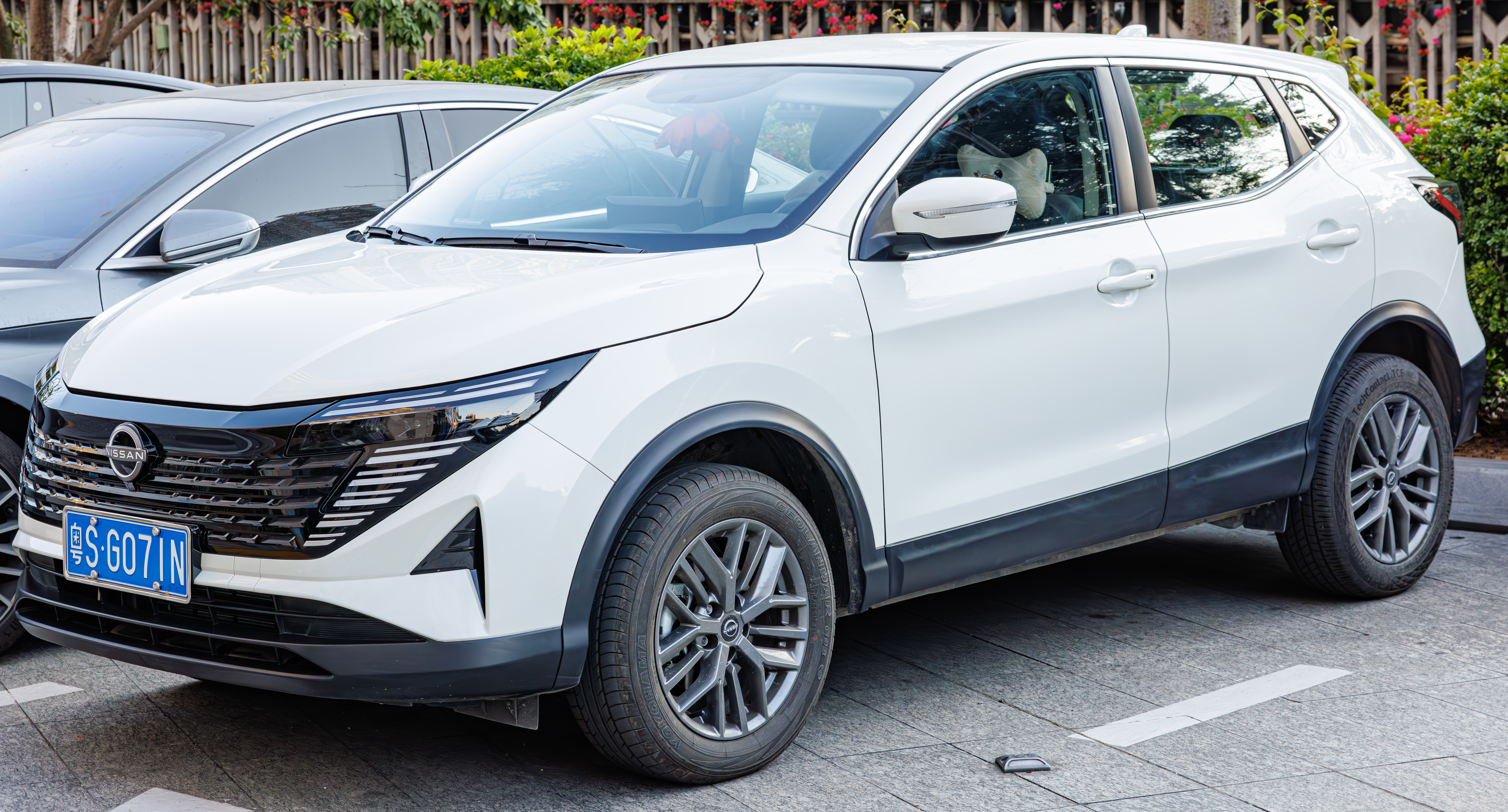
Nissan Qashqai Glory

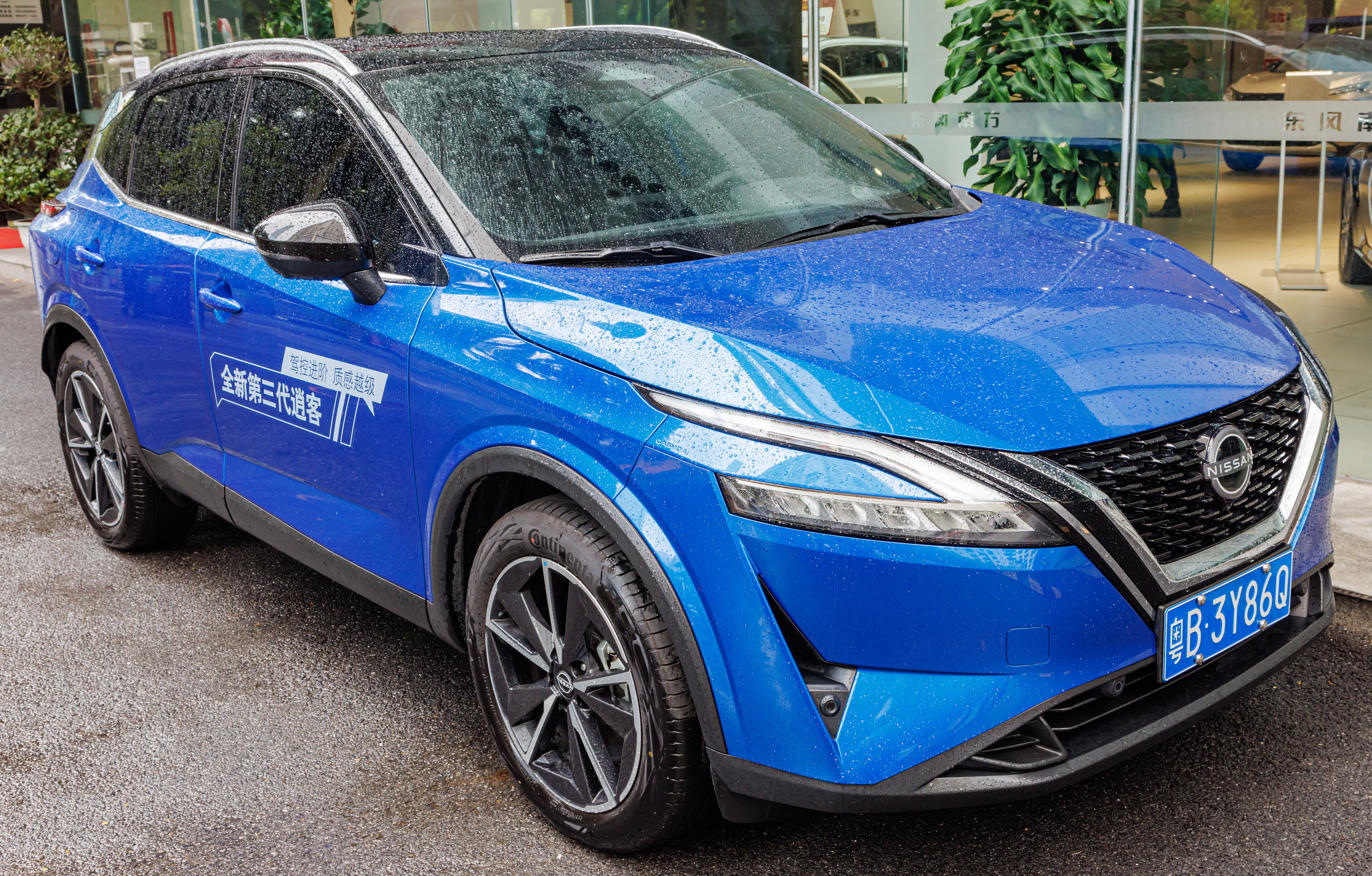
Nissan Qashqai

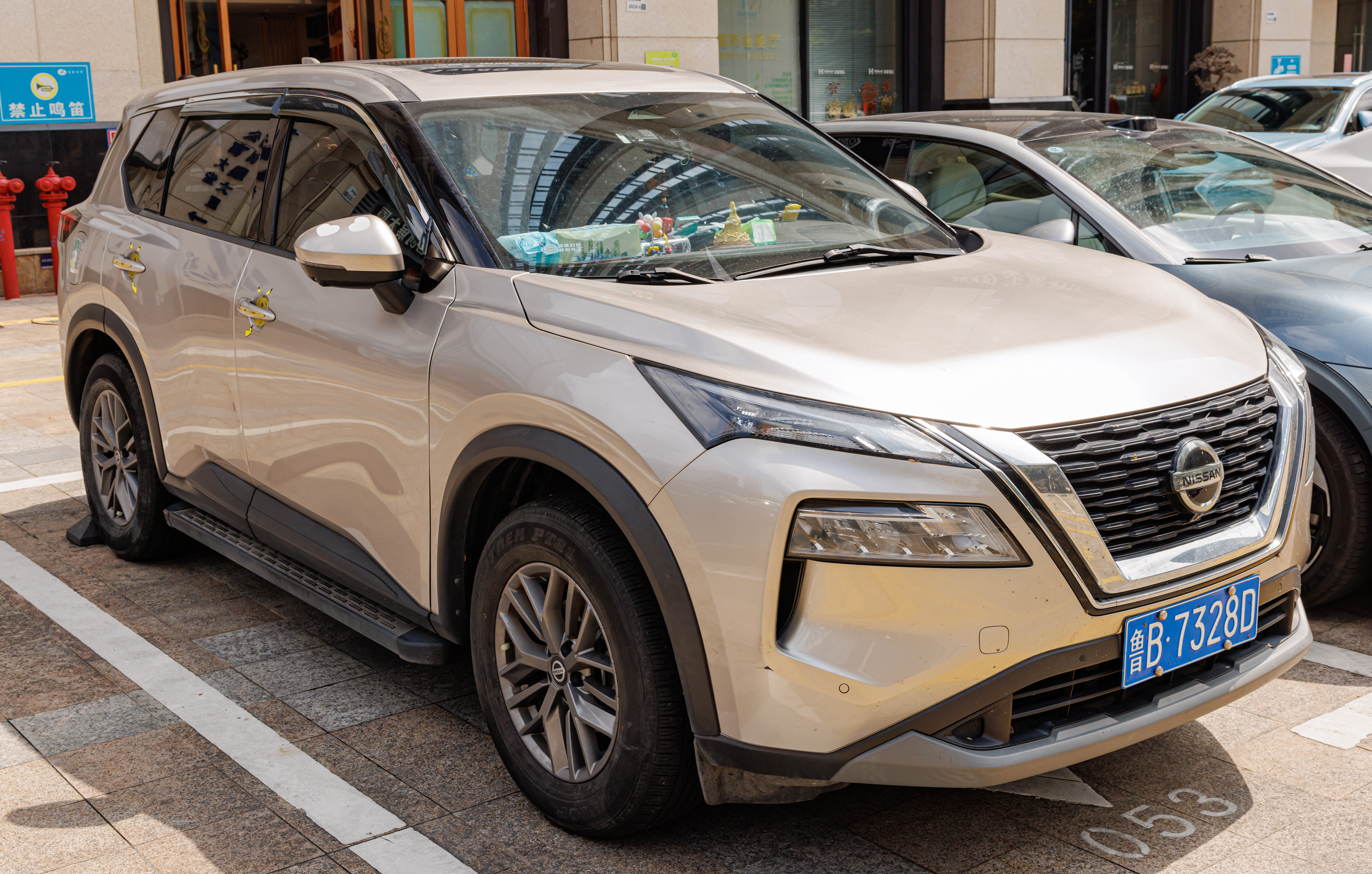
Nissan X-Trail

=== Former Products ===
- Nissan March
- Nissan Sunny
- Nissan Lannia
- Nissan Maxima
- Nissan Murano
- Nissan Teana
- Nissan Livina
- Nissan Bluebird
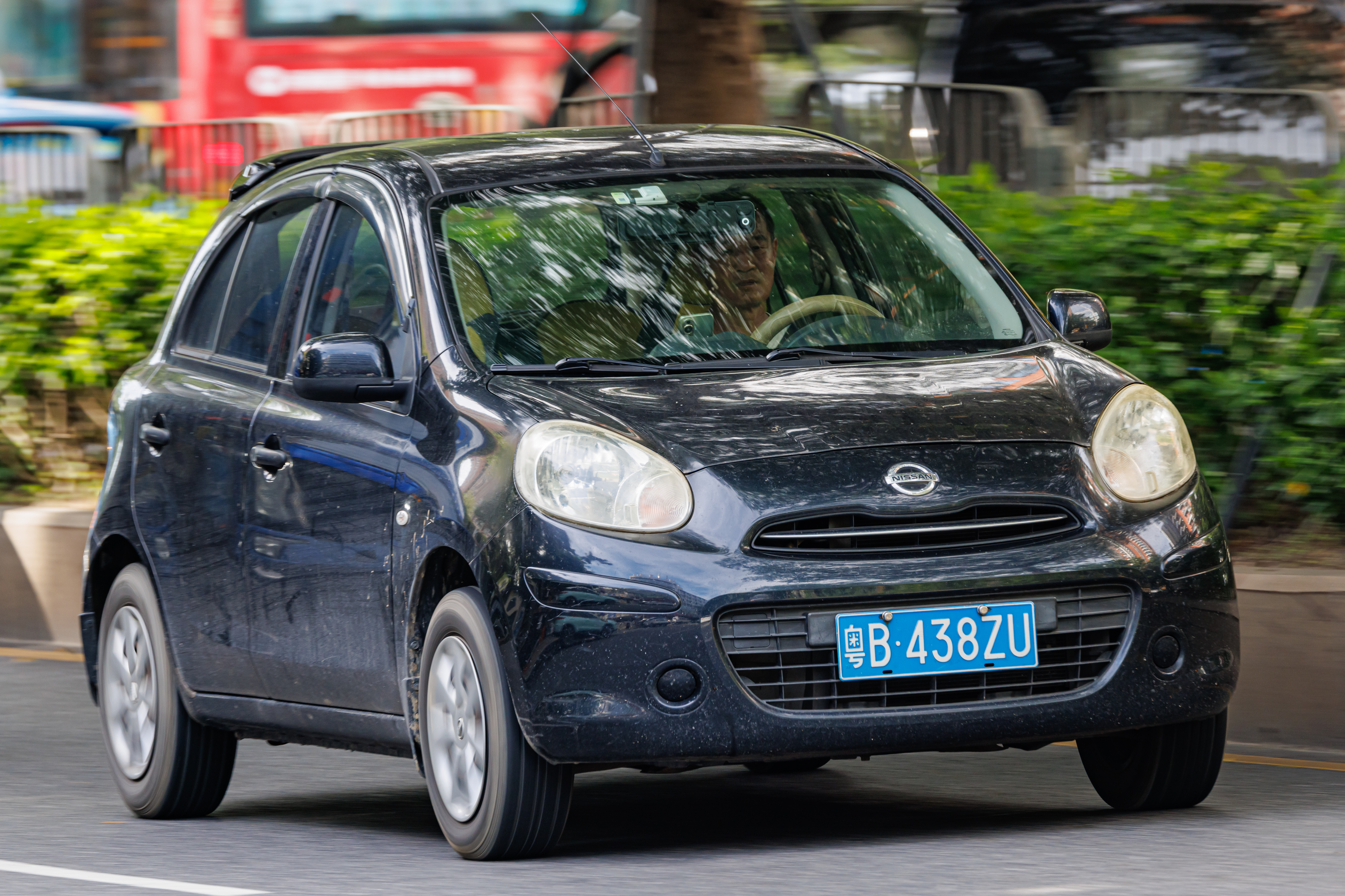
Nissan March

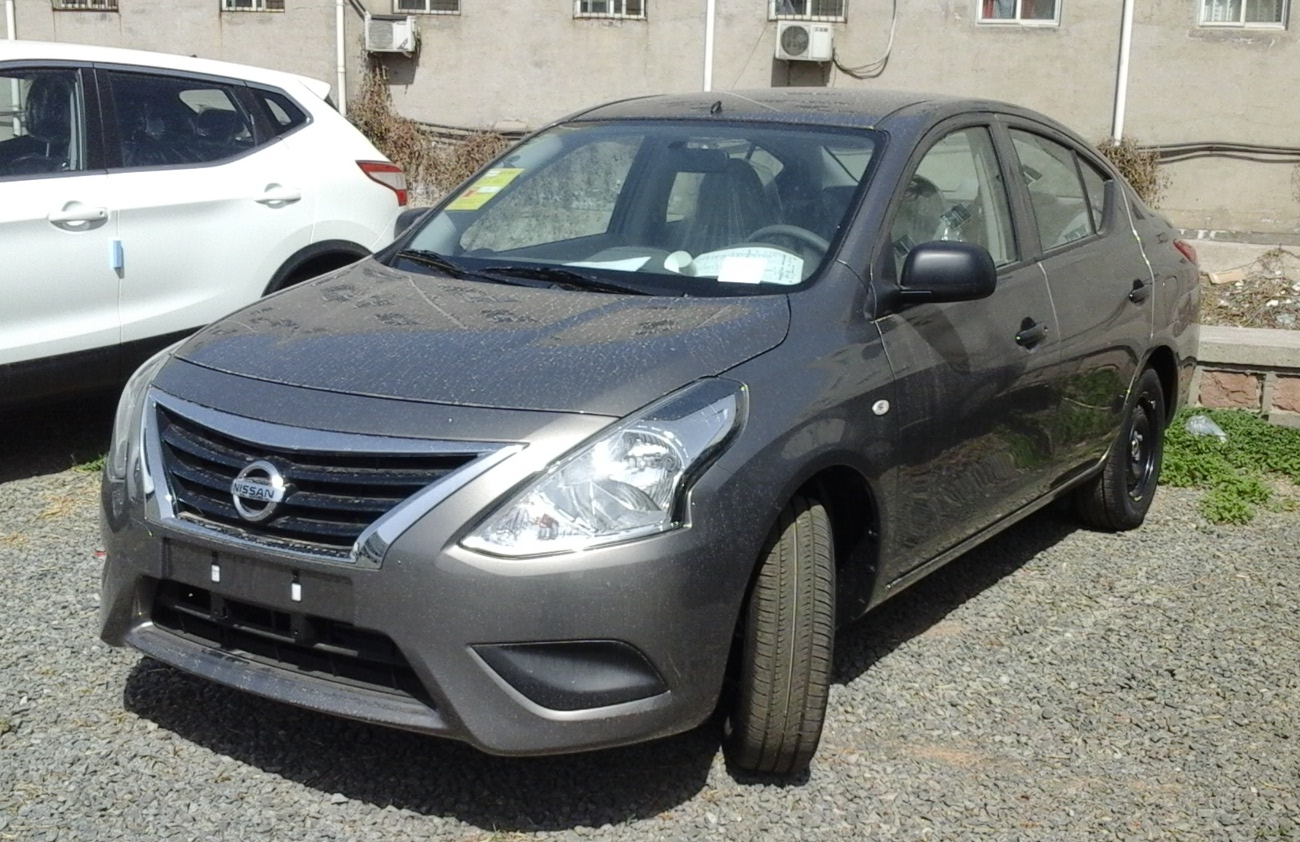
Nissan Sunny

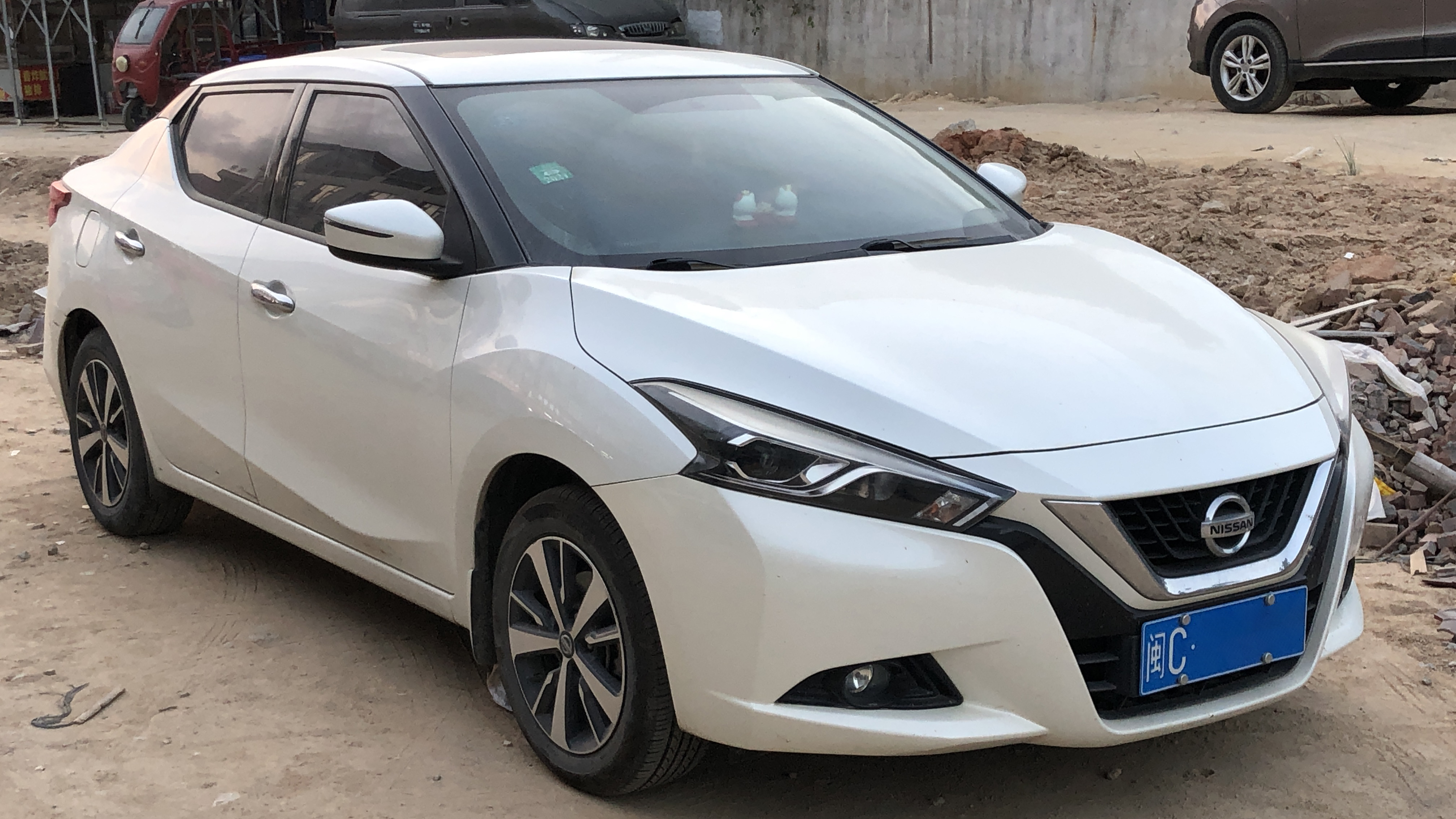
Nissan Lannia

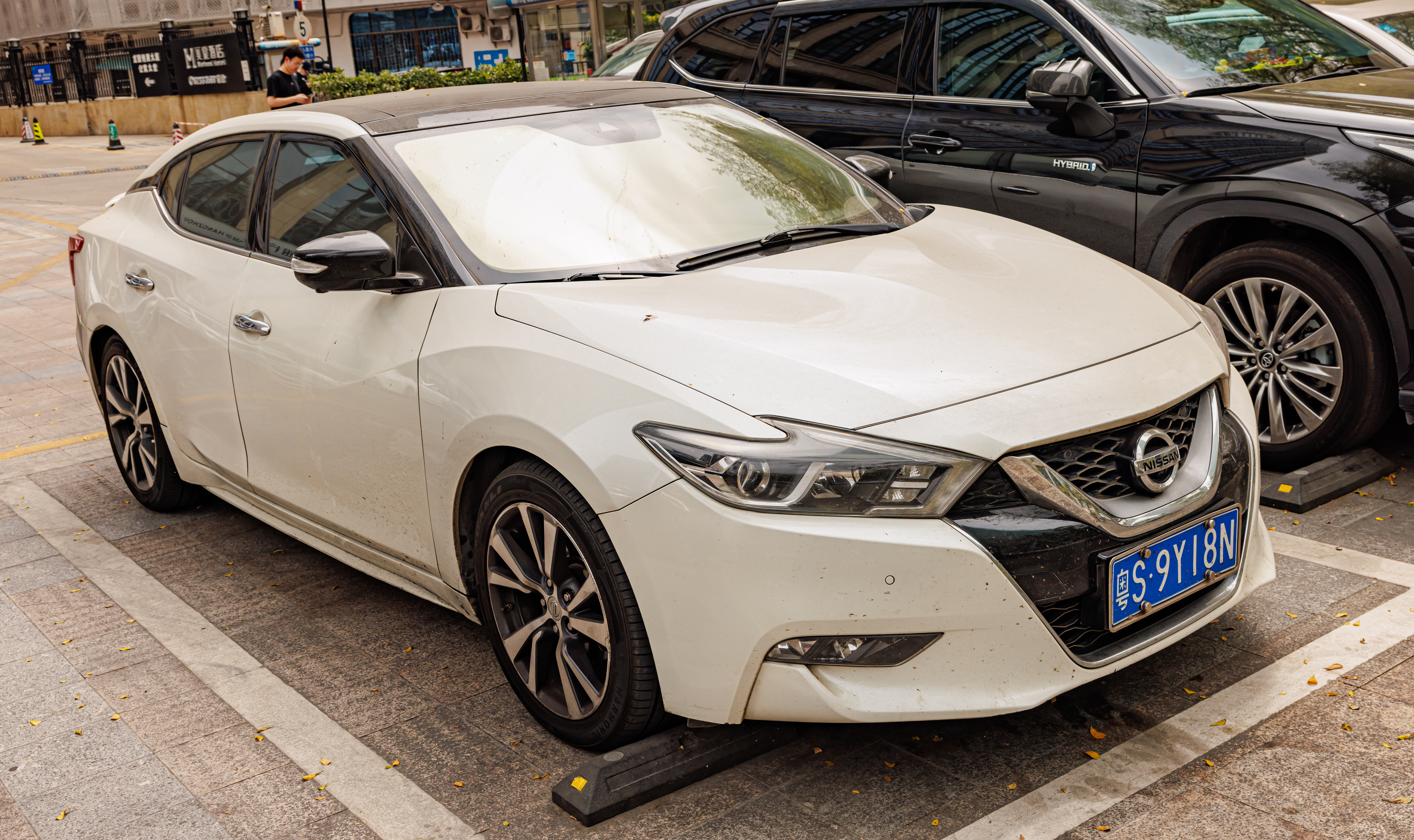
Nissan Maxima

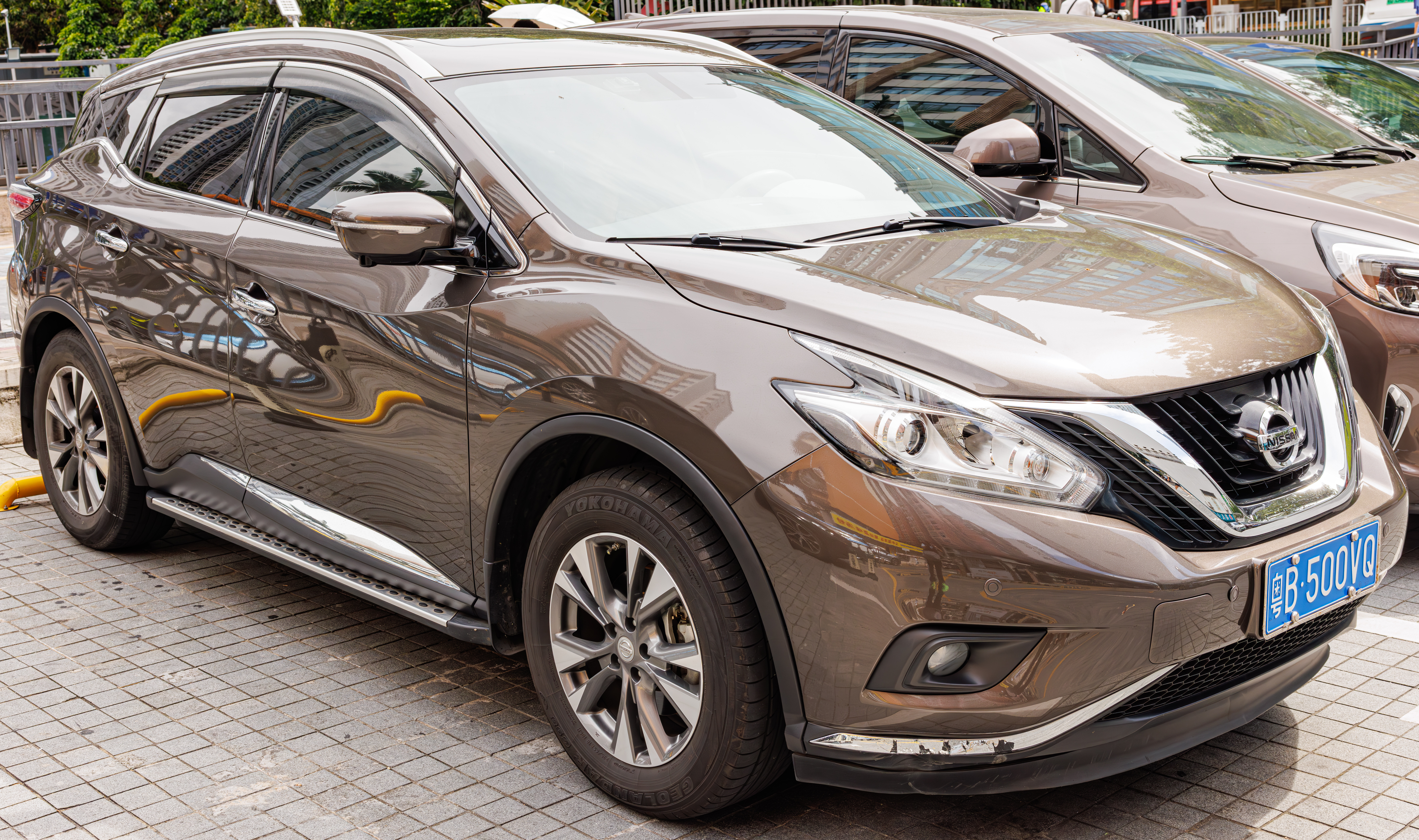
Nissan Murano

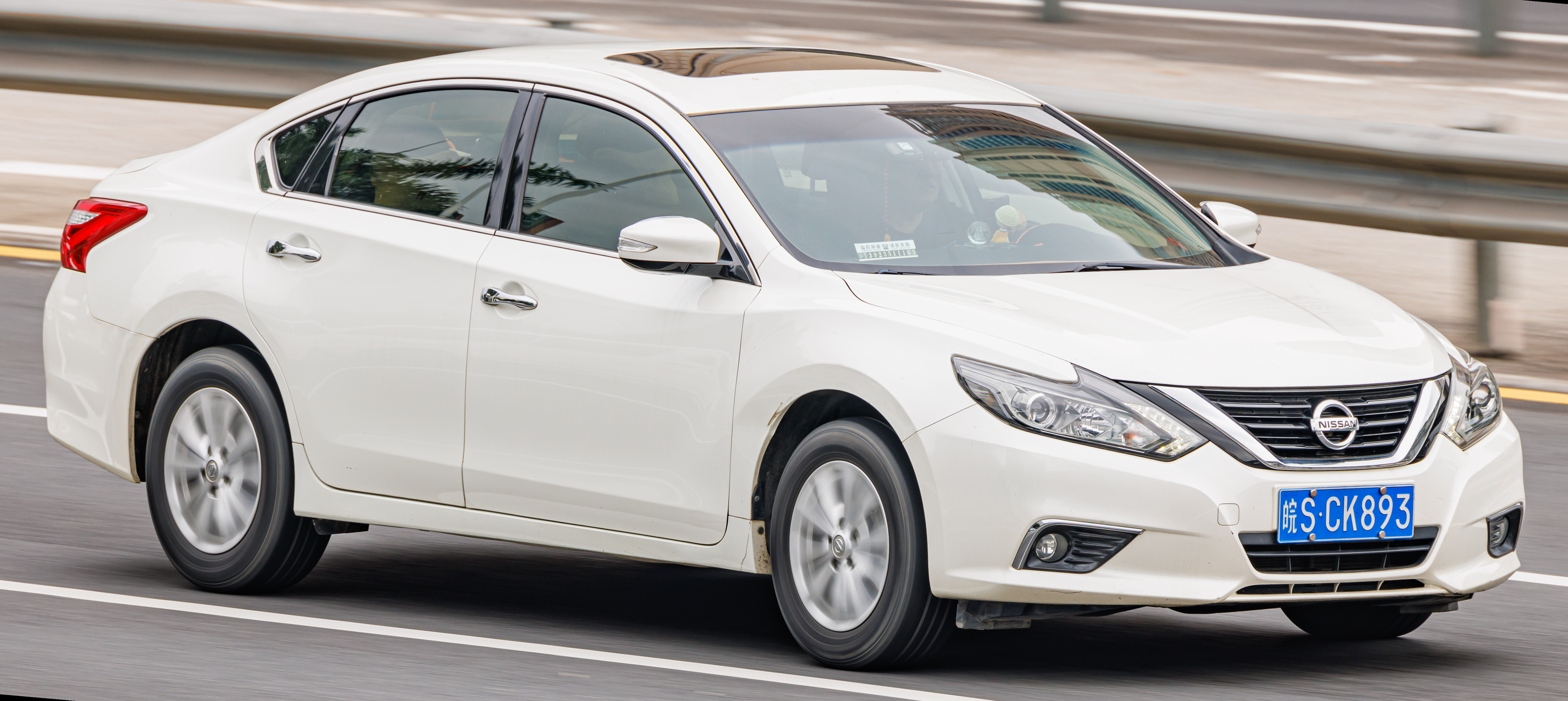
Nissan Teana

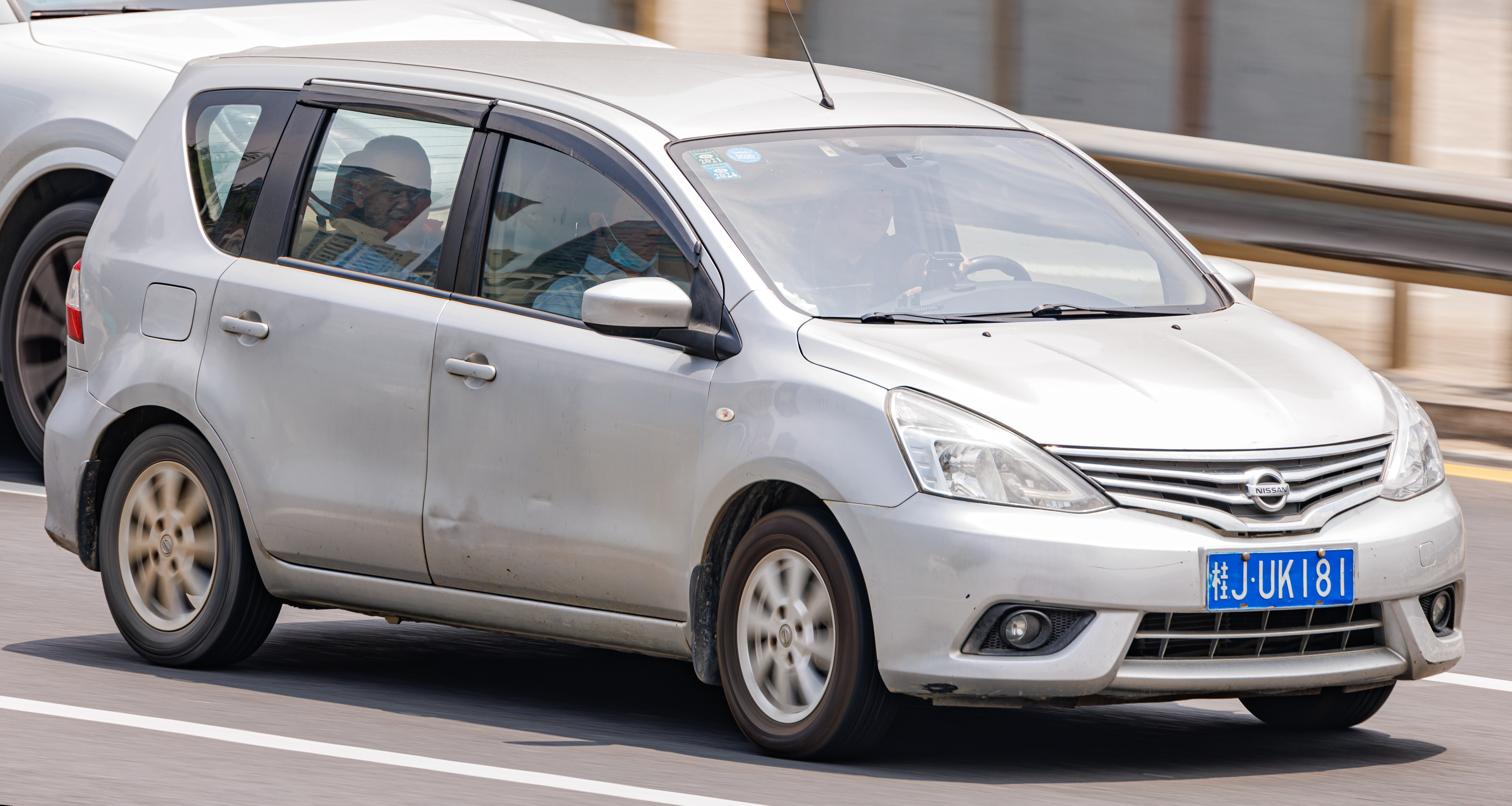
Nissan Livina

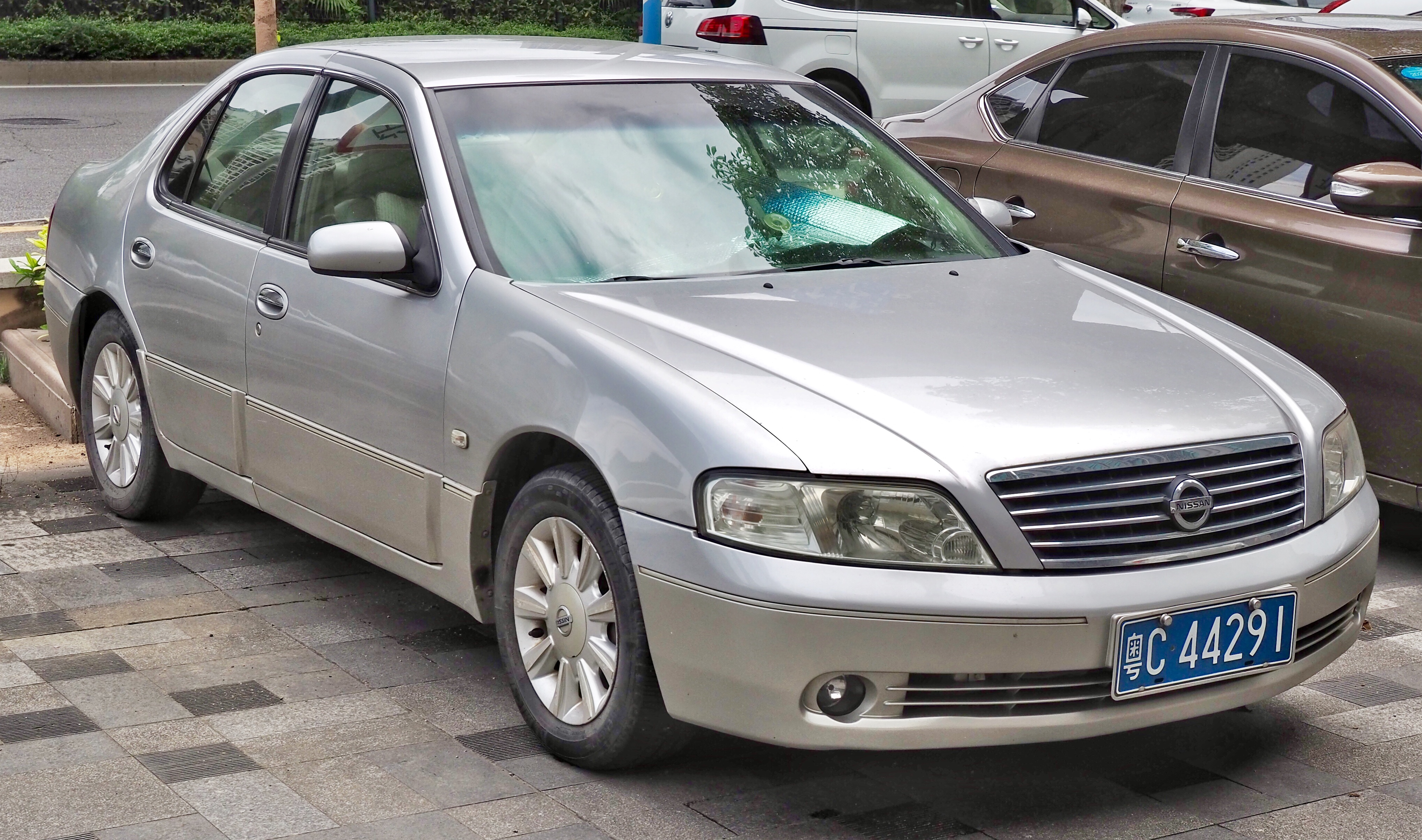
Nissan Bluebird

== Zhengzhou Nissan ==
After the majority stake of Zhengzhou Nissan was acquired by Dongfeng Motor Co., Ltd., there are three brands of products sold under the firm, including Dongfeng, Fengdu, and Nissan.

=== Dongfeng products ===
- Dongfeng Rich
  - Dongfeng Rich EV
  - Dongfeng Rich SUV
- Dongfeng Rich 6
- Dongfeng Rich 7
- Dongfeng Z9
- Dongfeng Succe (discontinued)
  - Dongfeng Succe EV
  - Dongfeng Succe EV panelvan
- Dongfeng Yufeng
- Dongfeng Yufeng S16 (discontinued)
- Dongfeng Yufeng P16
- Dongfeng Yufeng EM26
- Dongfeng Yufeng EM27L
- Dongfeng Junfeng
- Dongfeng Oting (discontinued)
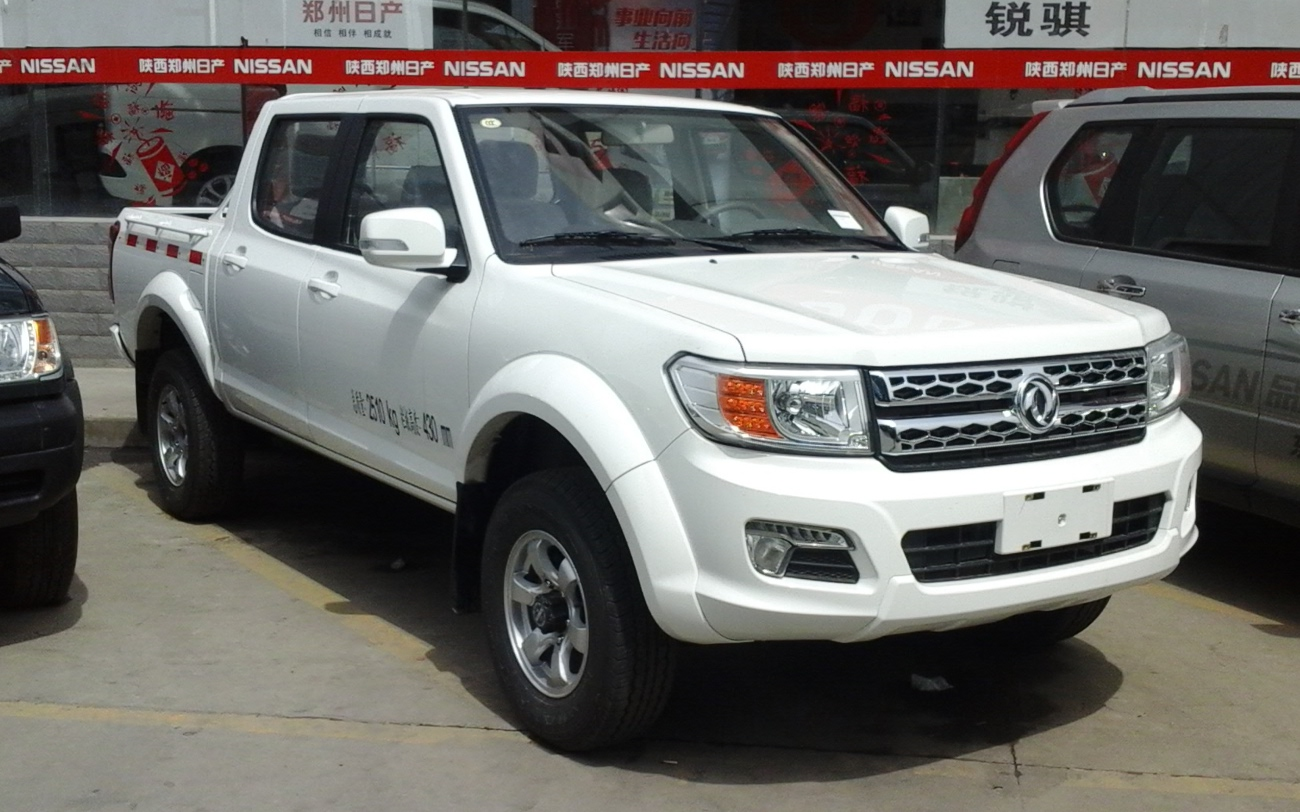
Dongfeng Rich

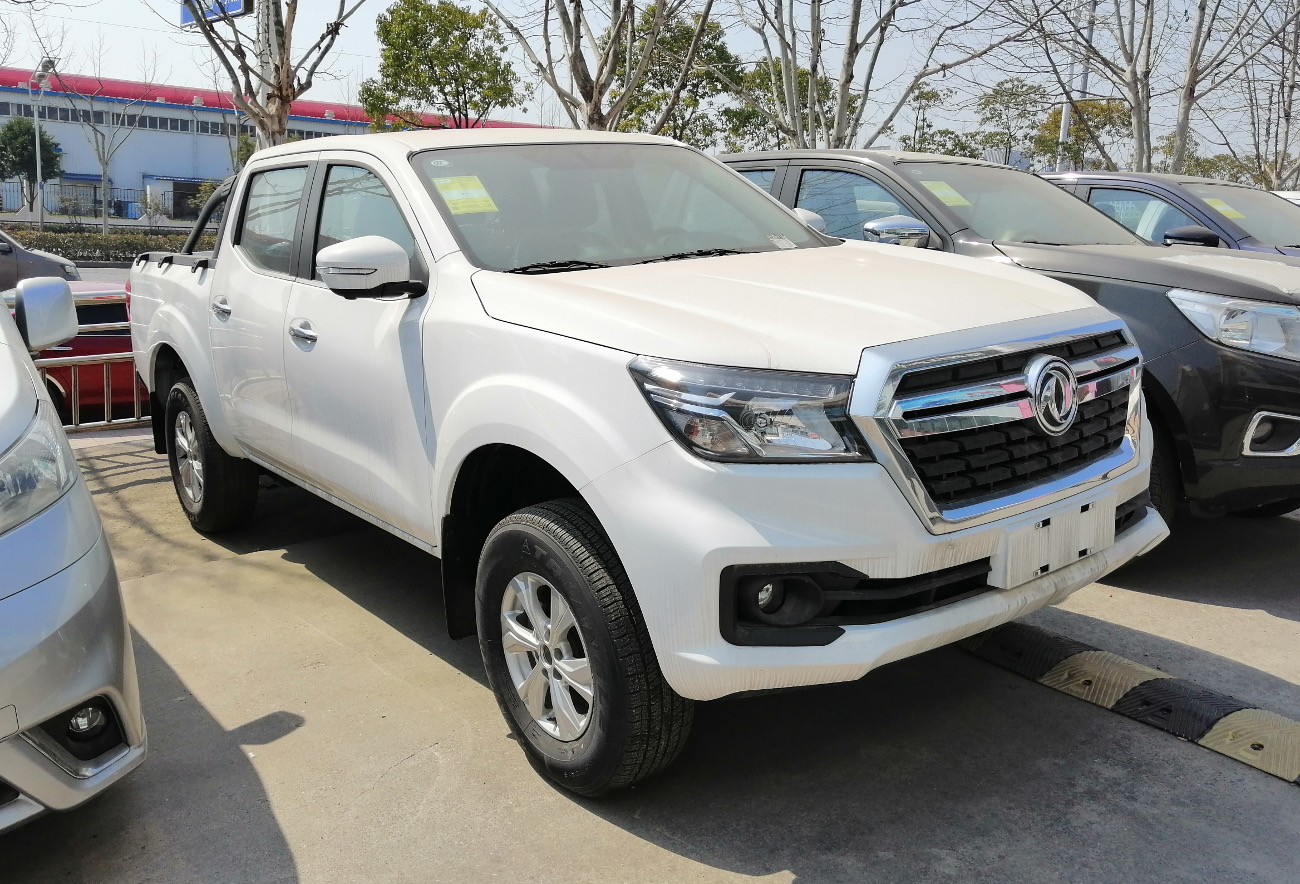
Dongfeng Rich 6

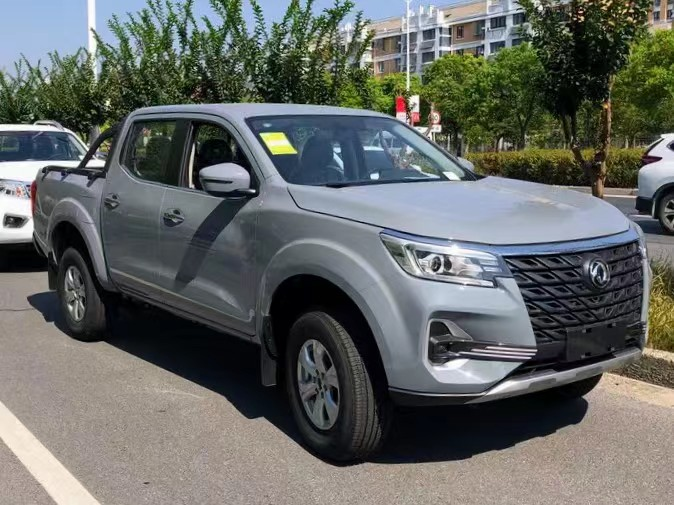
Dongfeng Rich 7

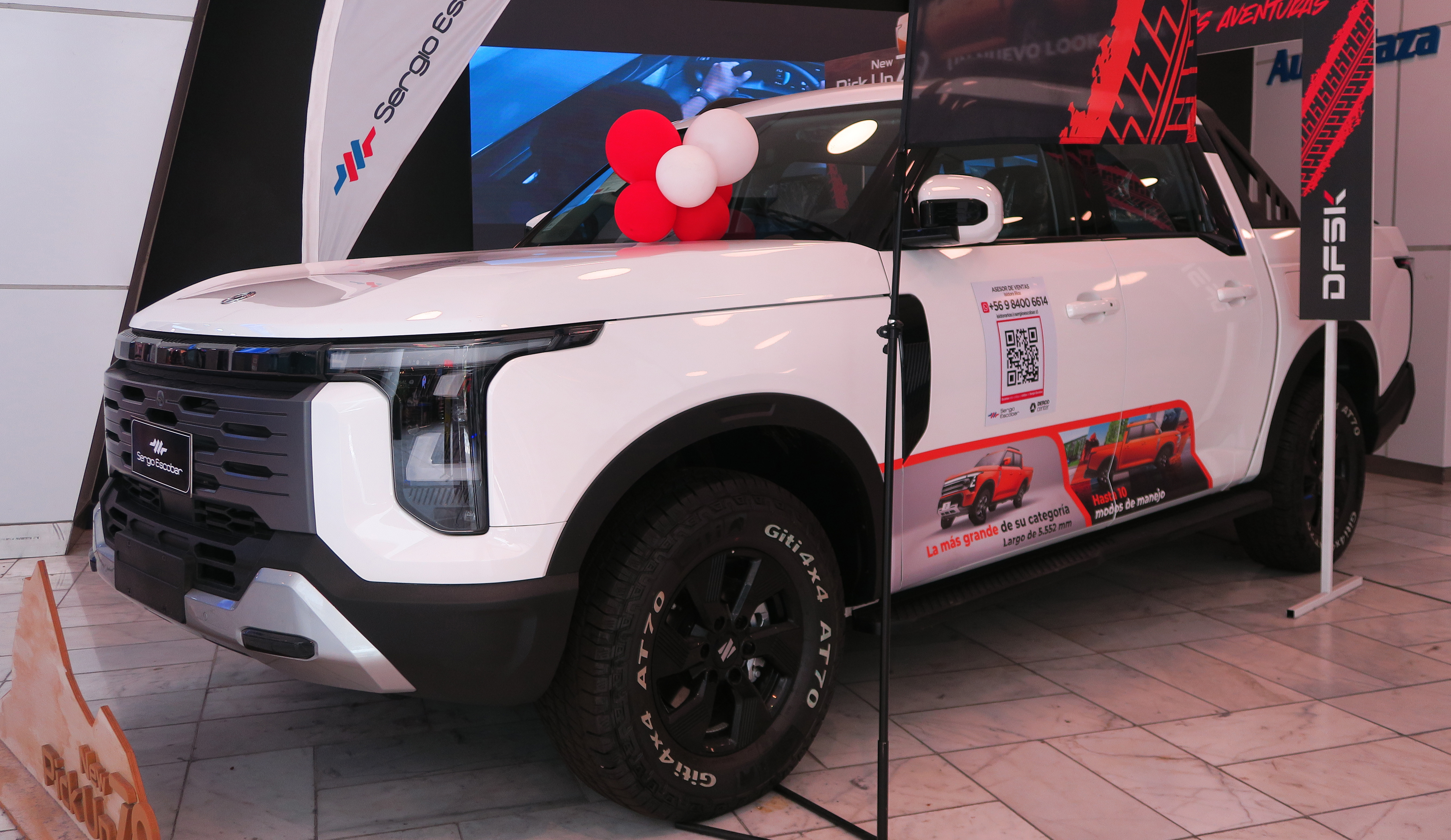
Dongfeng Z9

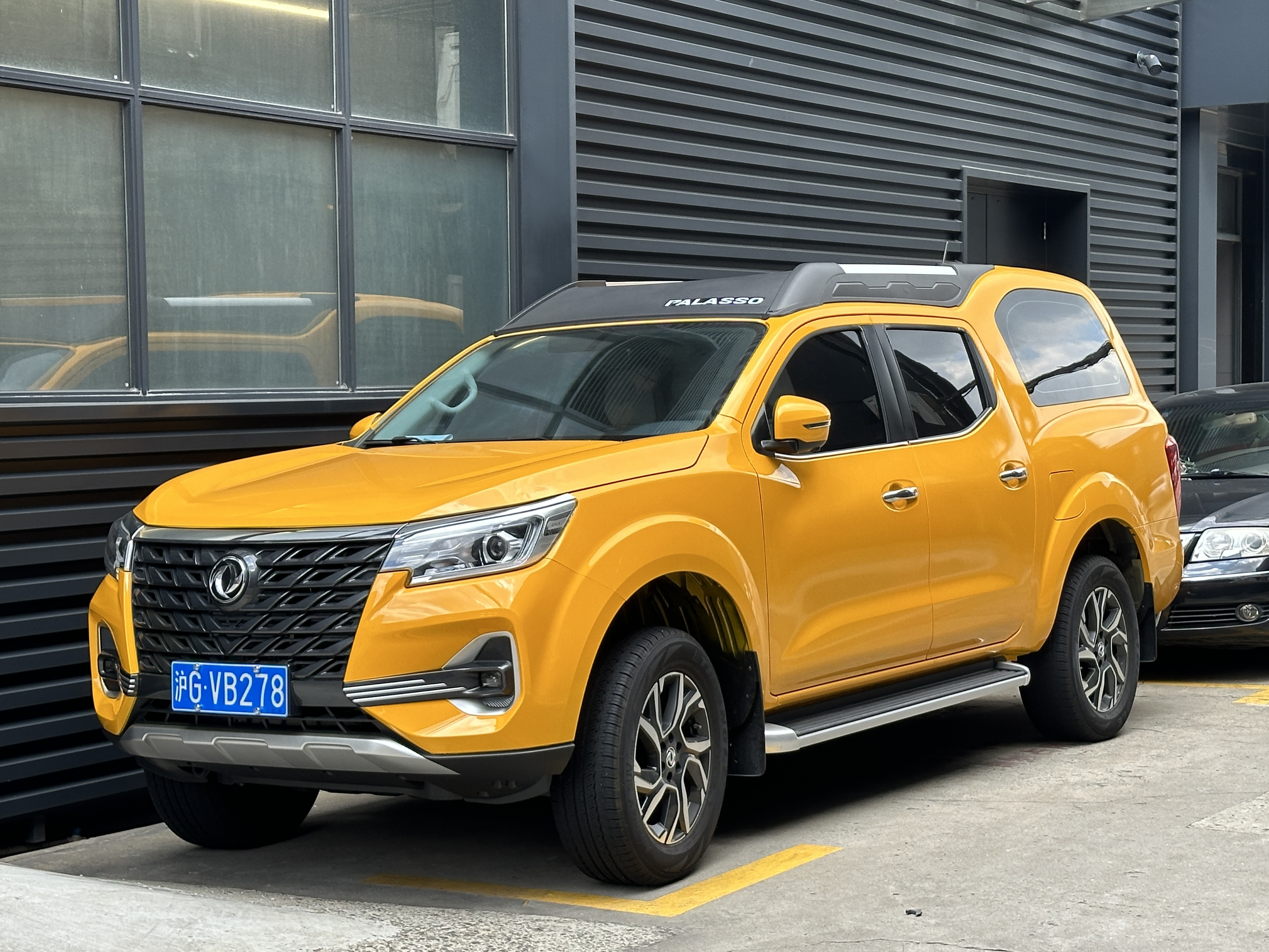
Dongfeng Palazzo

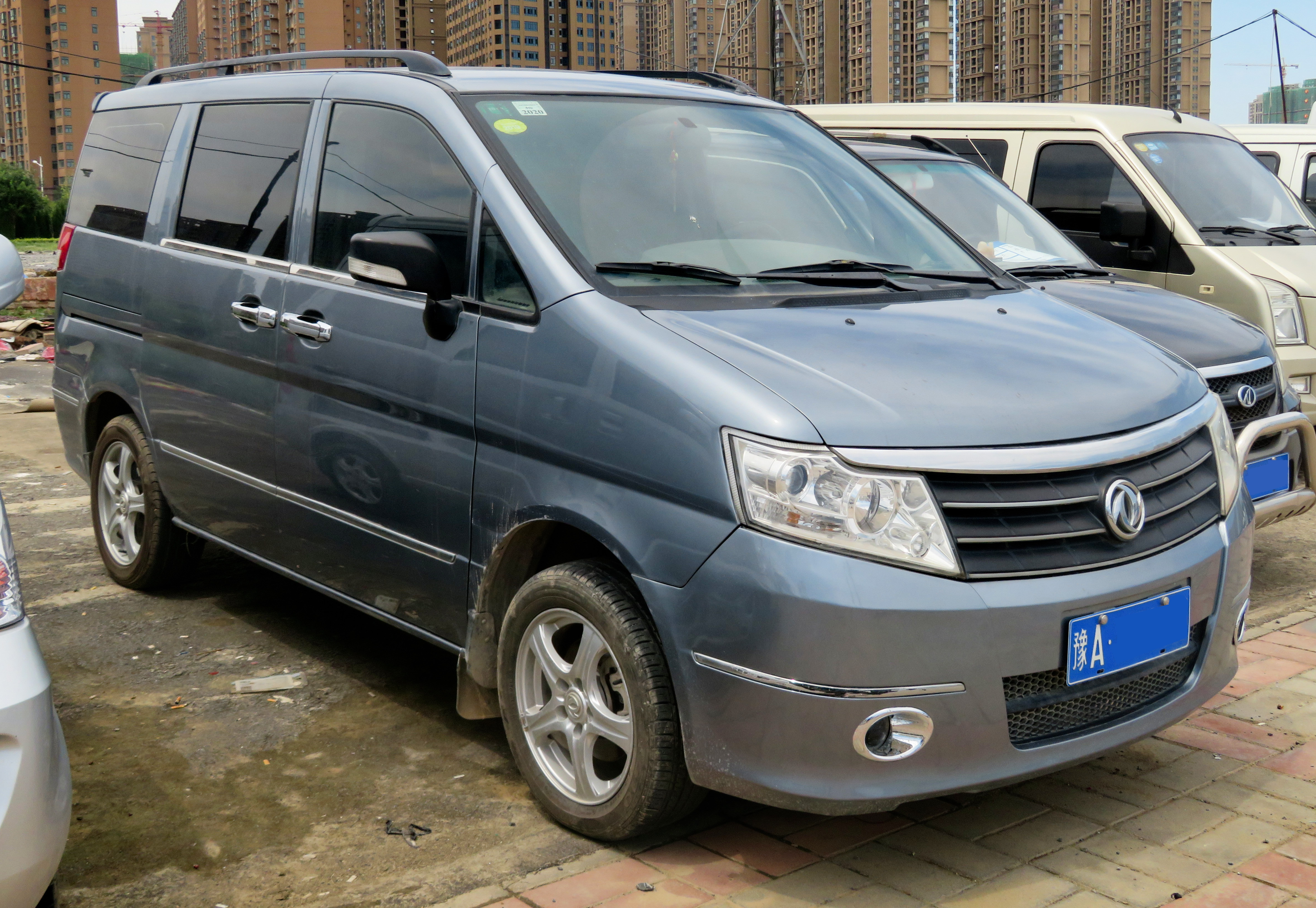
Dongfeng Succe

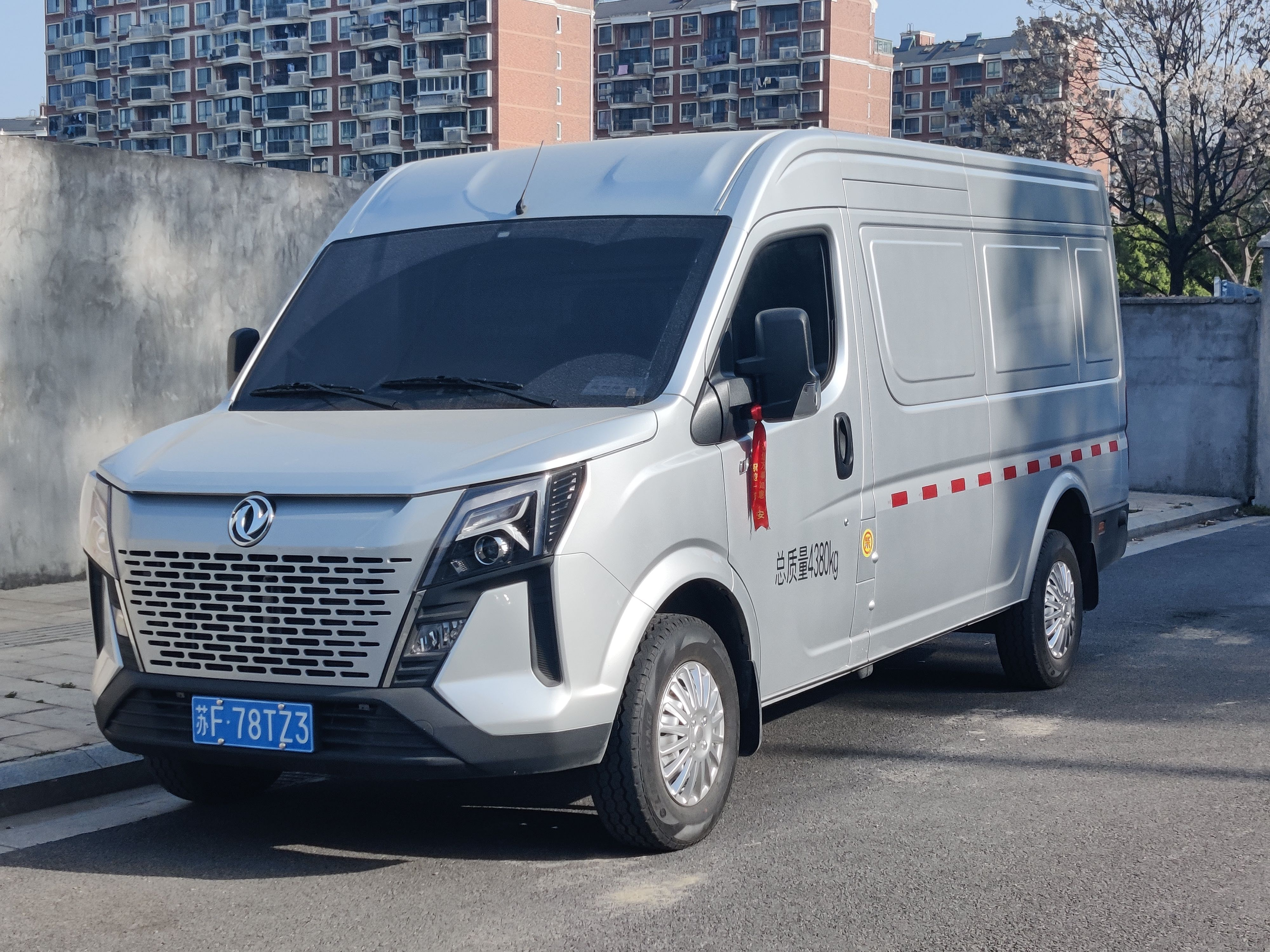
Dongfeng Yufeng

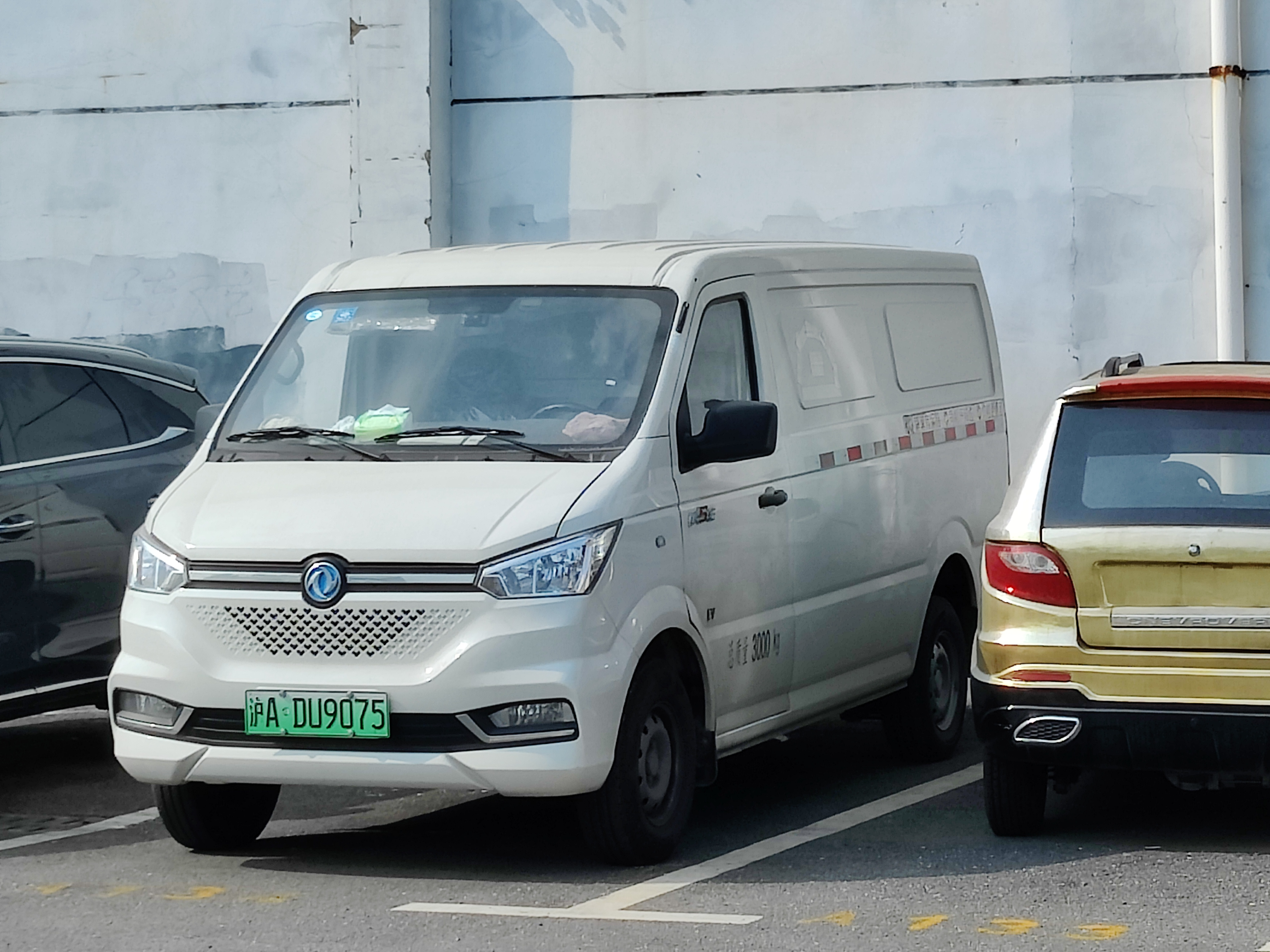
Dongfeng Yufeng EM26

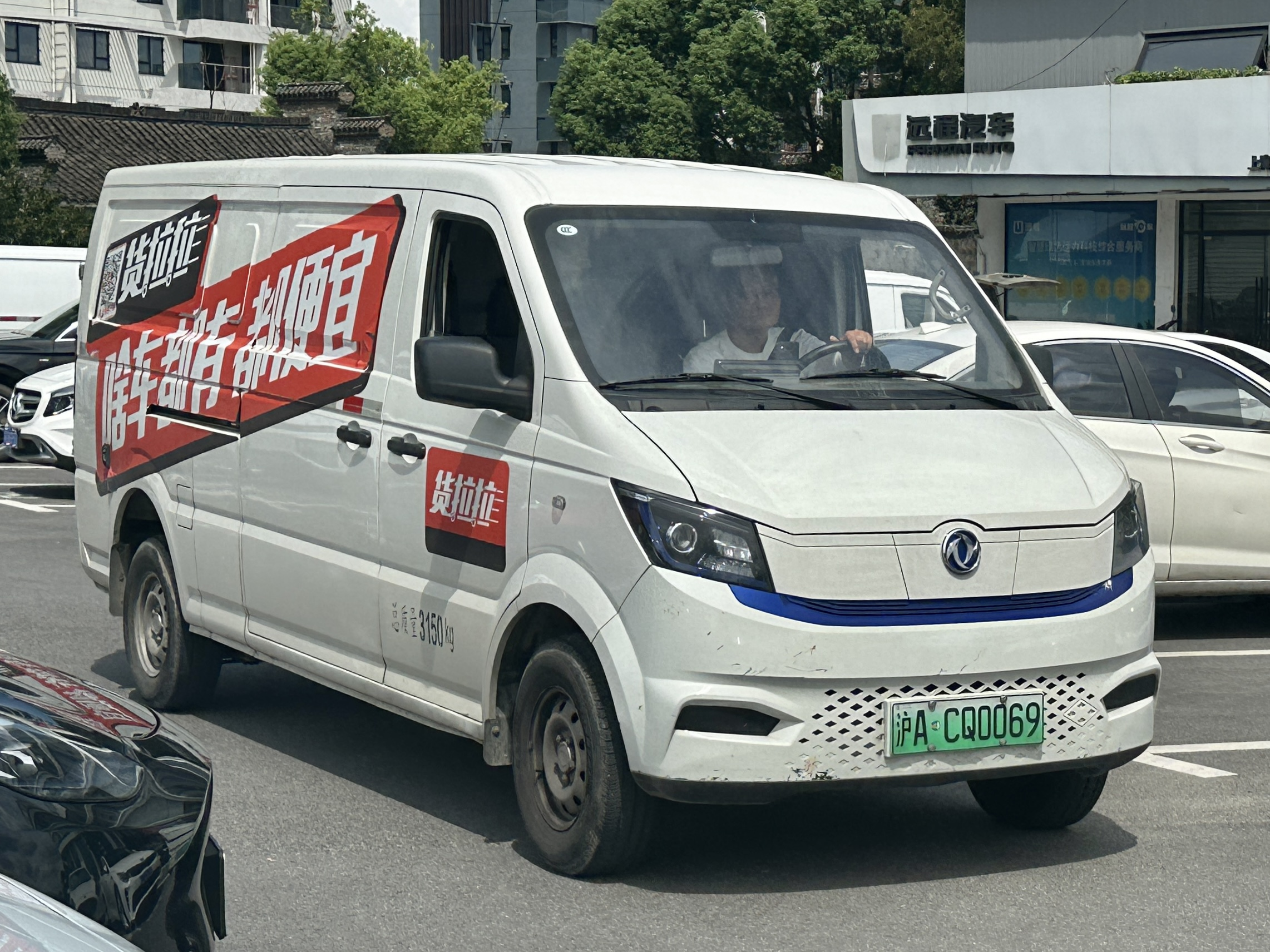
Dongfeng Yufeng EM27L

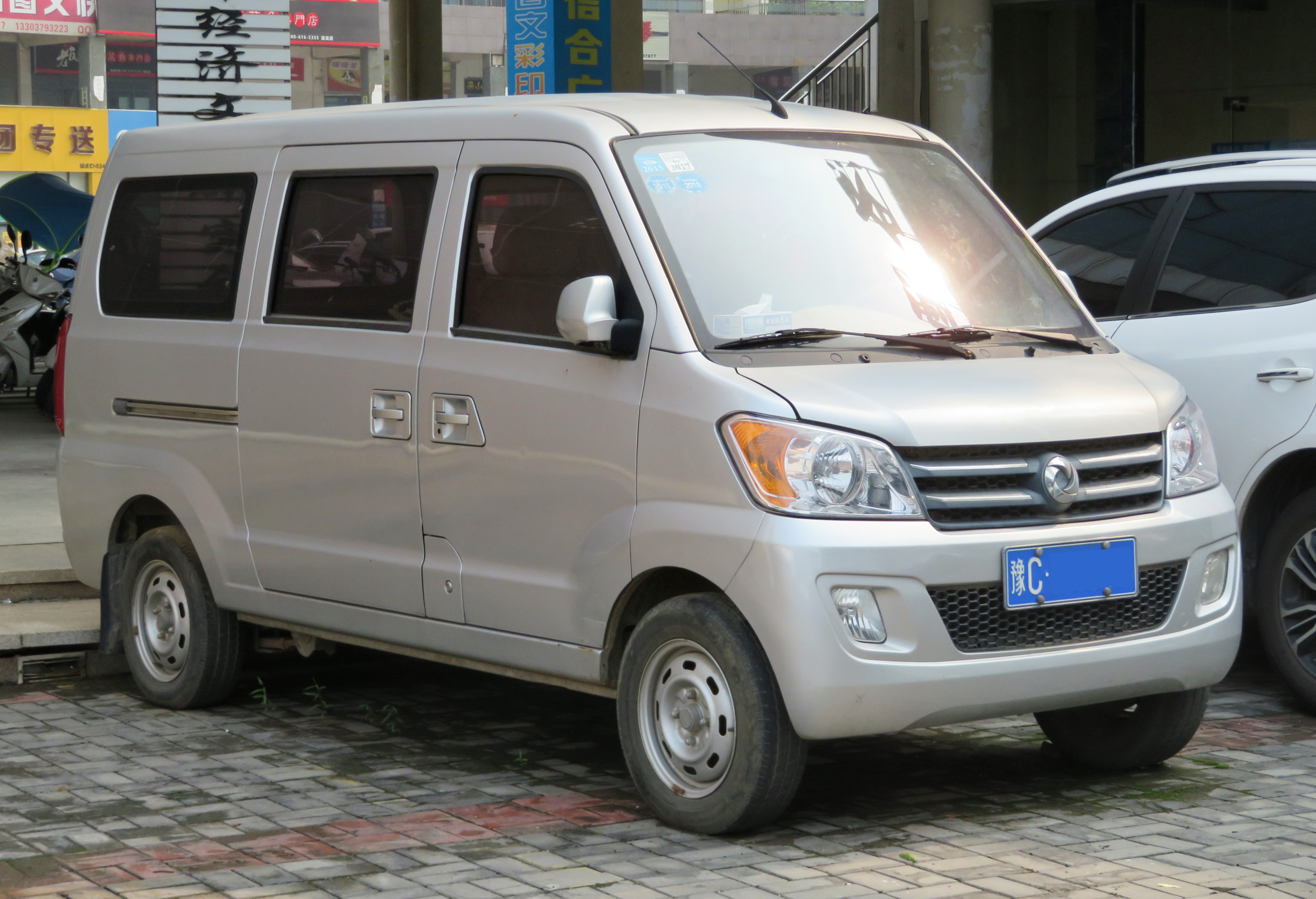
Dongfeng Junfeng

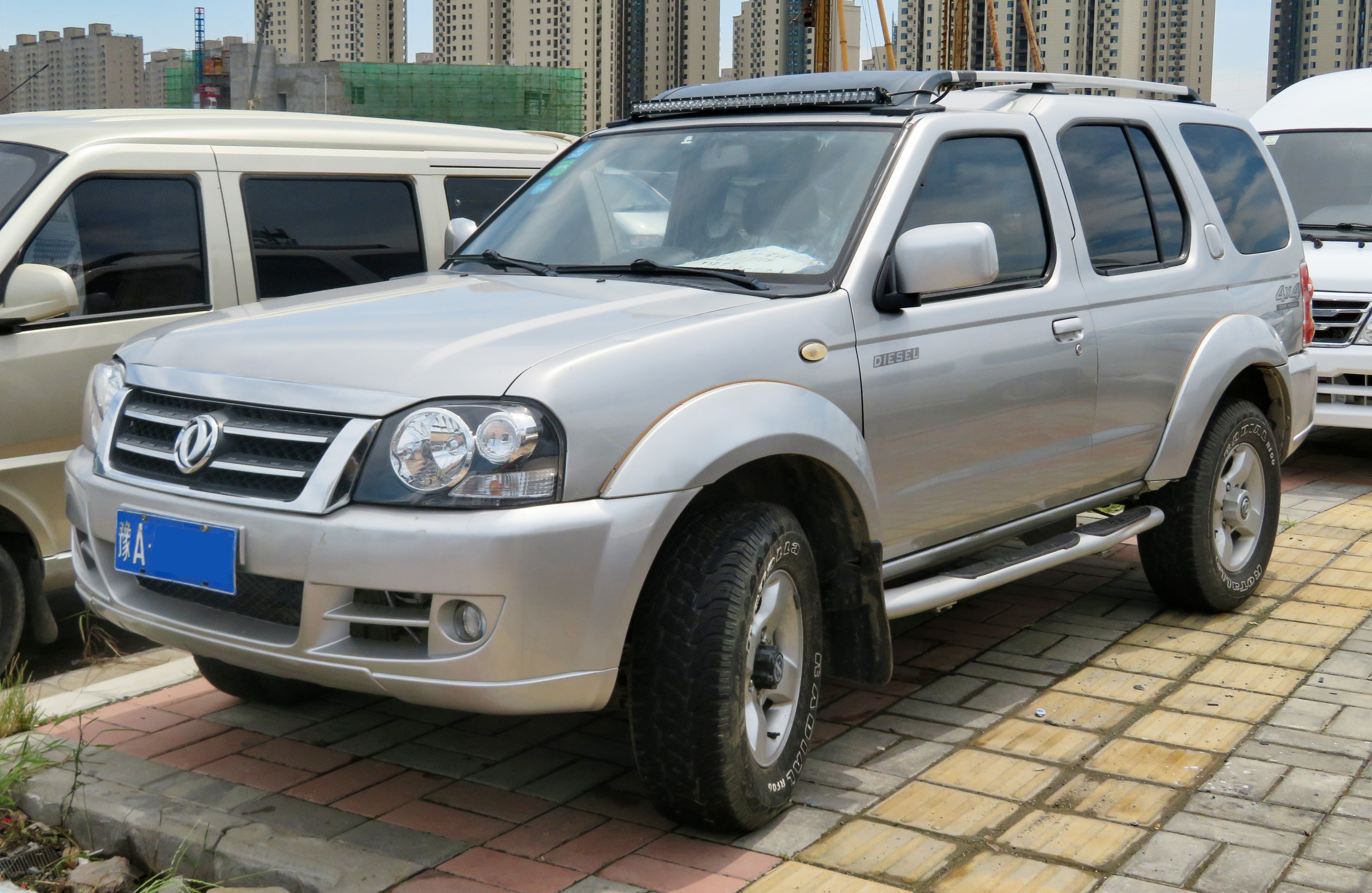
Dongfeng Oting

=== Dongfeng Ruitaite products ===
Electric commercial van products.

- Dongfeng Ruitaite EM10
- Dongfeng Ruitaite EM16
- Dongfeng Ruitaite EM30
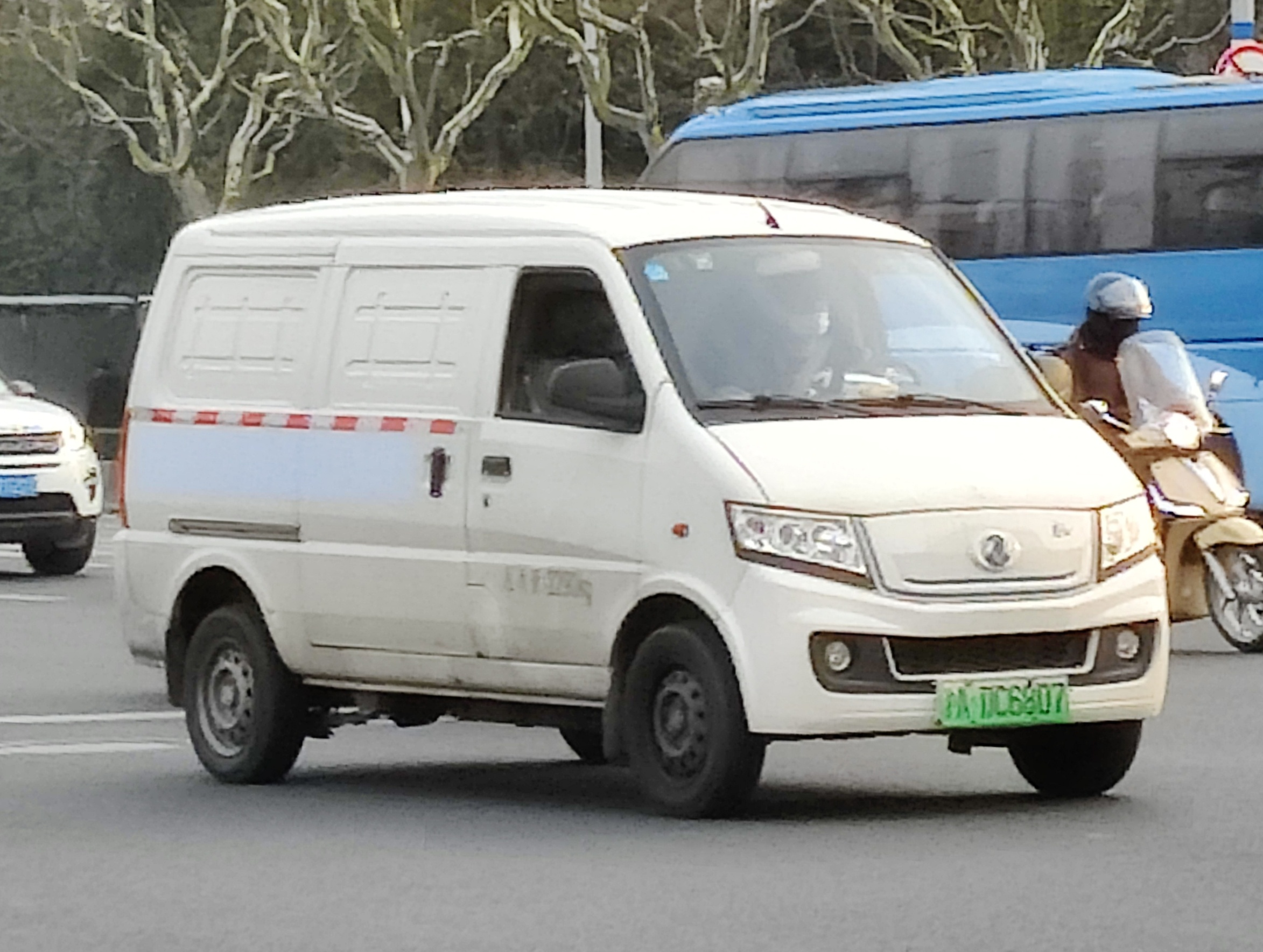
Dongfeng Ruitaite EM10

=== Fengdu products ===
- Fengdu MX3
- Fengdu MX5
- Fengdu MX6
- Fengdu Paladin
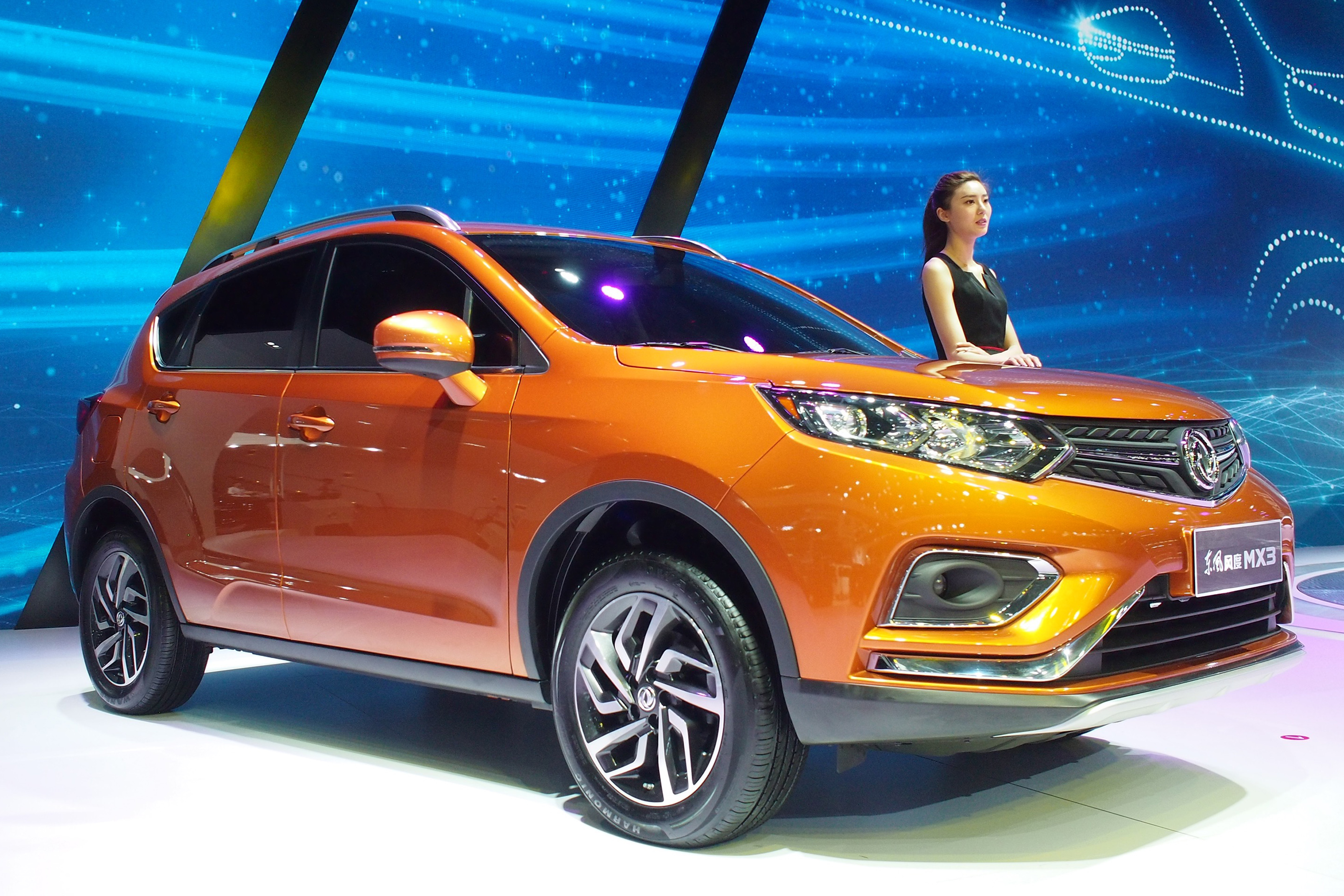
Fengdu MX3

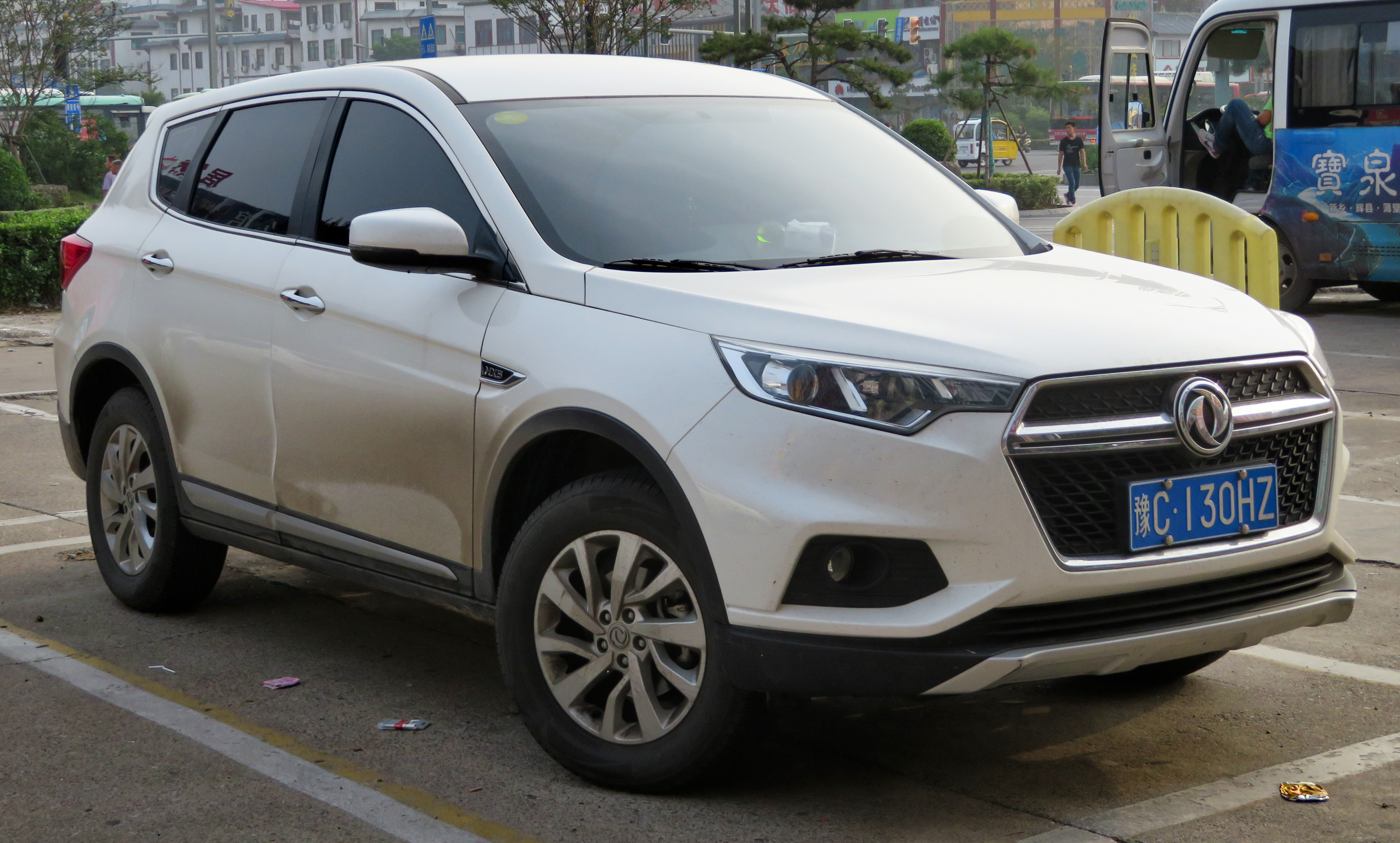
Fengdu MX5

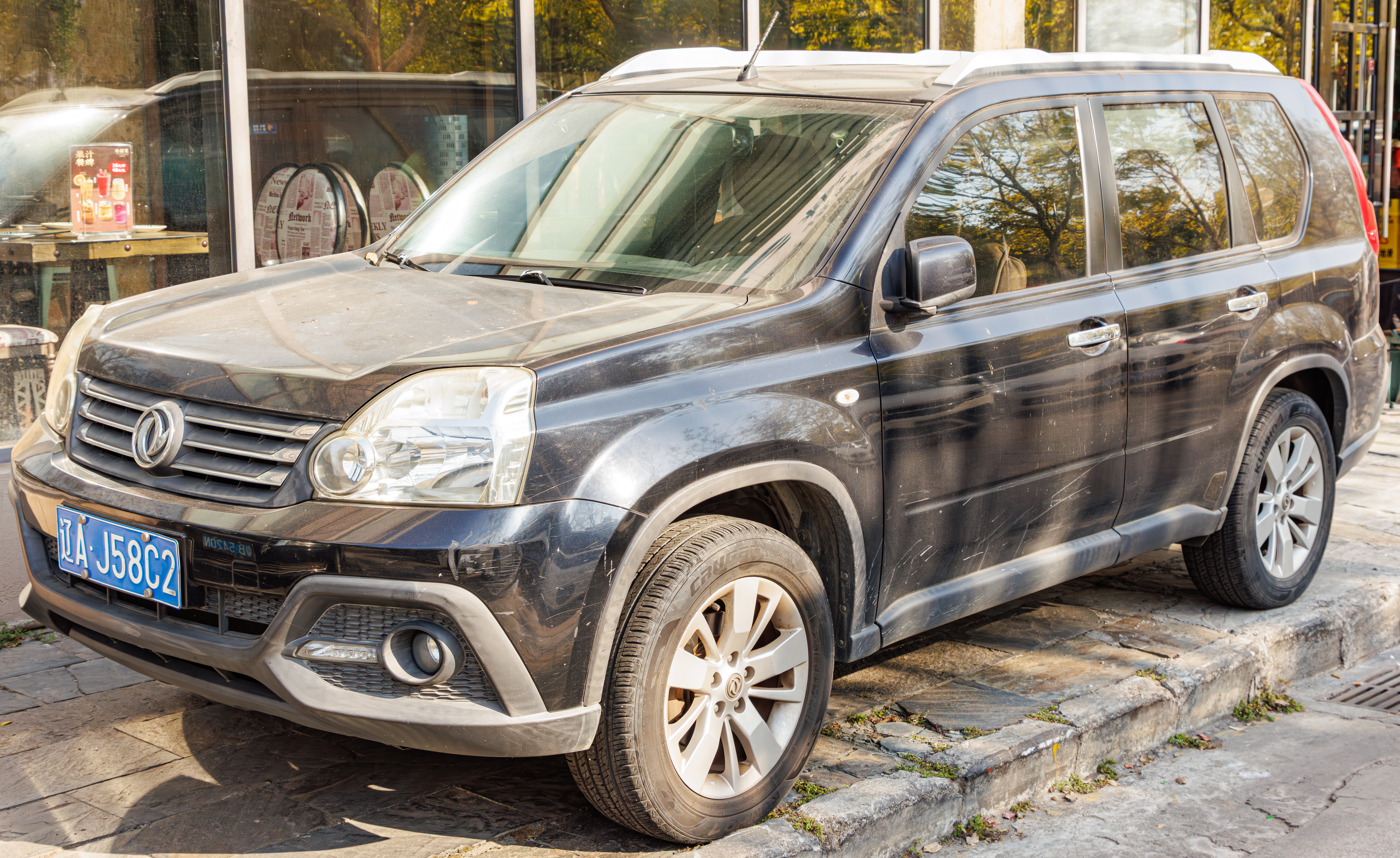
Fengdu MX6

=== Nissan products ===
- Nissan NV200
- Nissan Navara
- Nissan Terra
- Nissan Frontier Pro
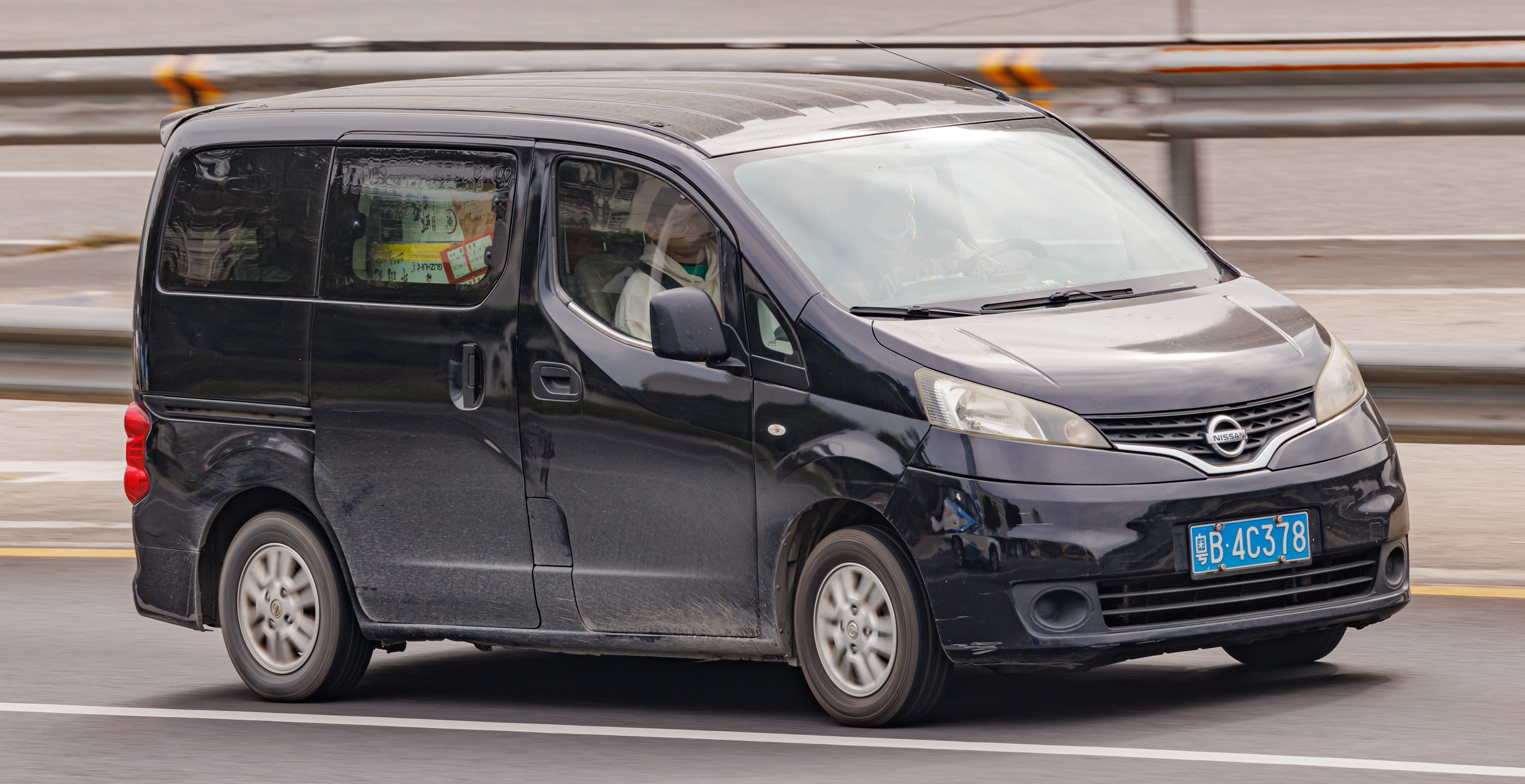
Nissan NV200

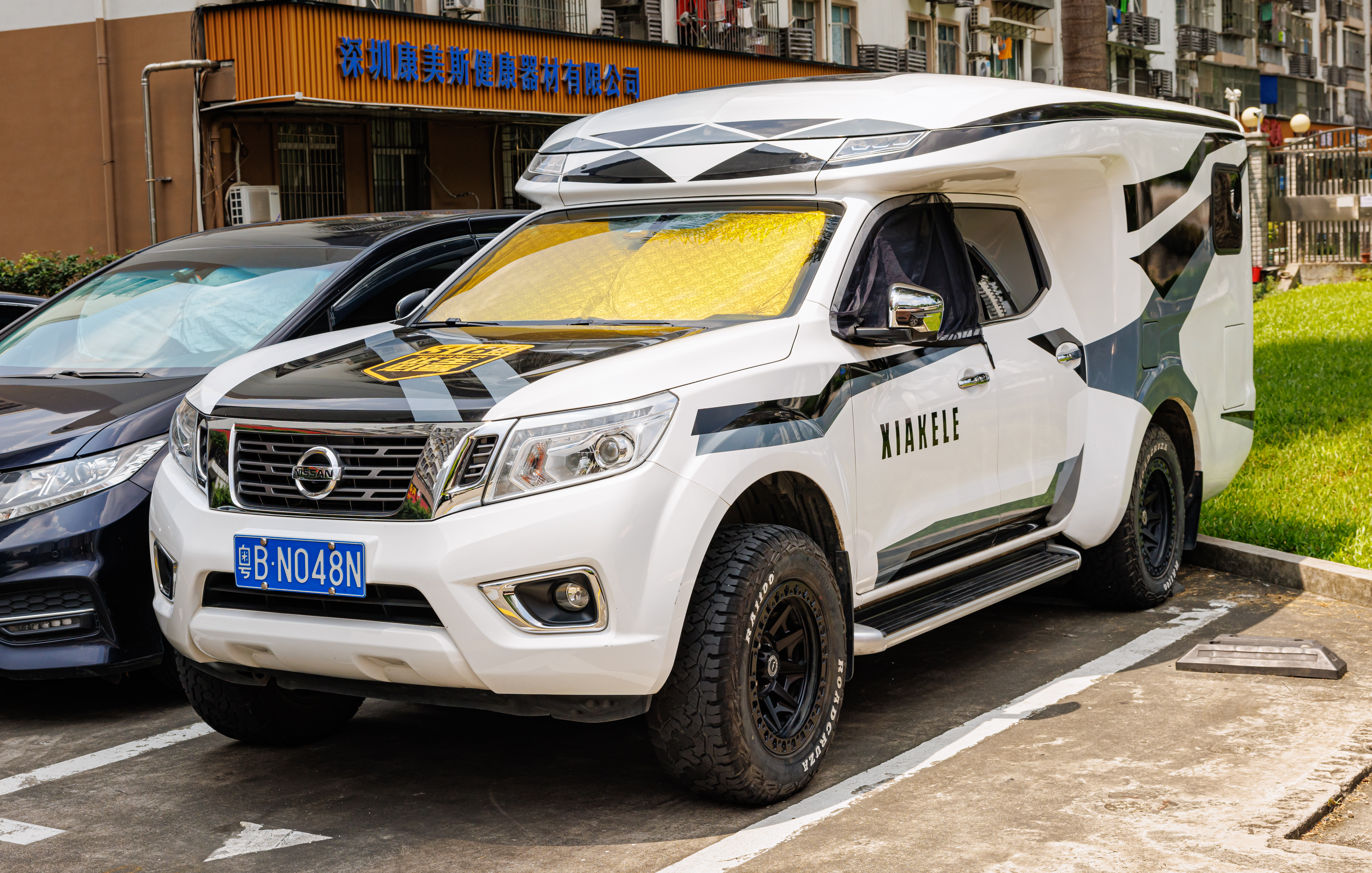
Nissan Navara

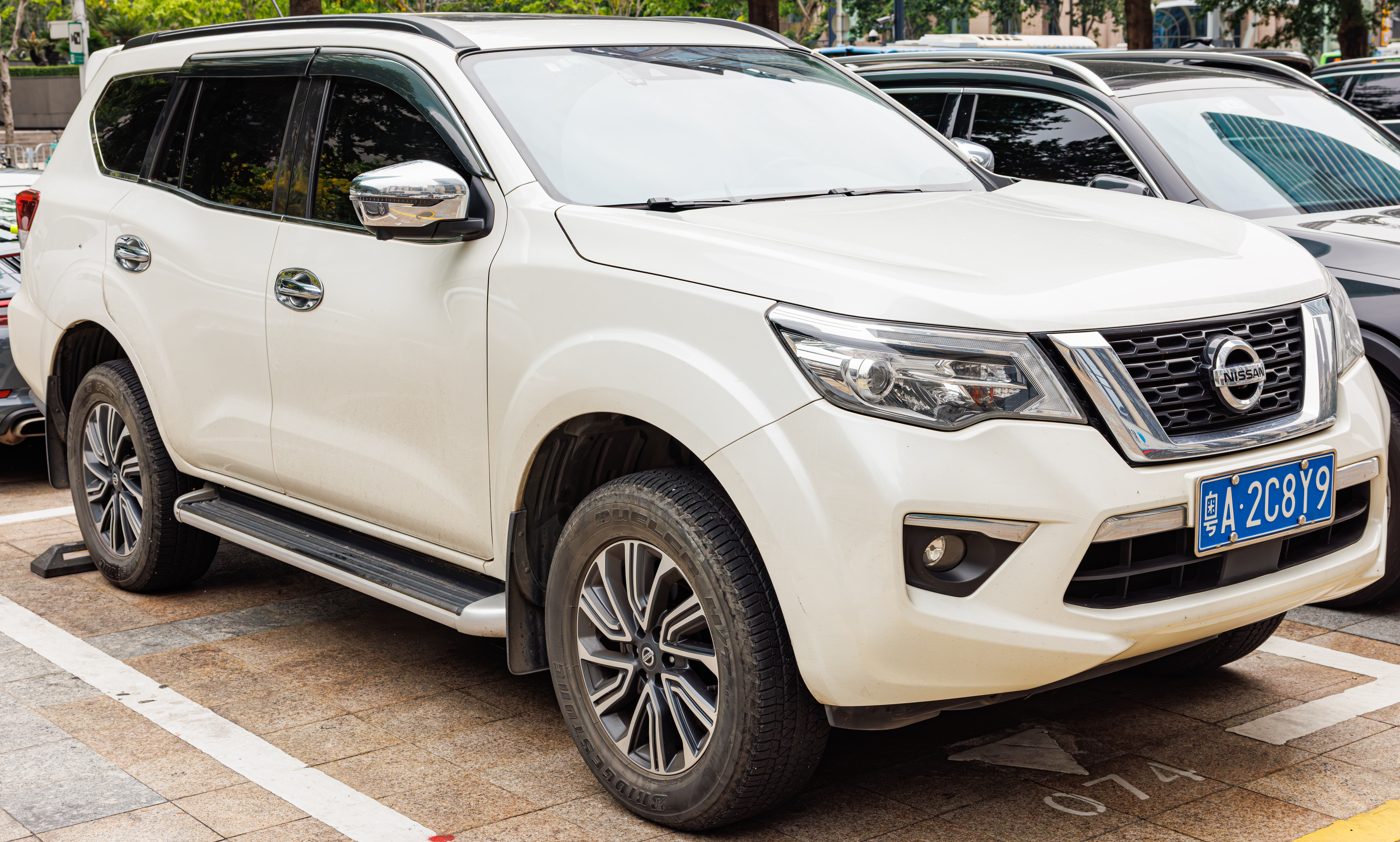
Nissan Terra

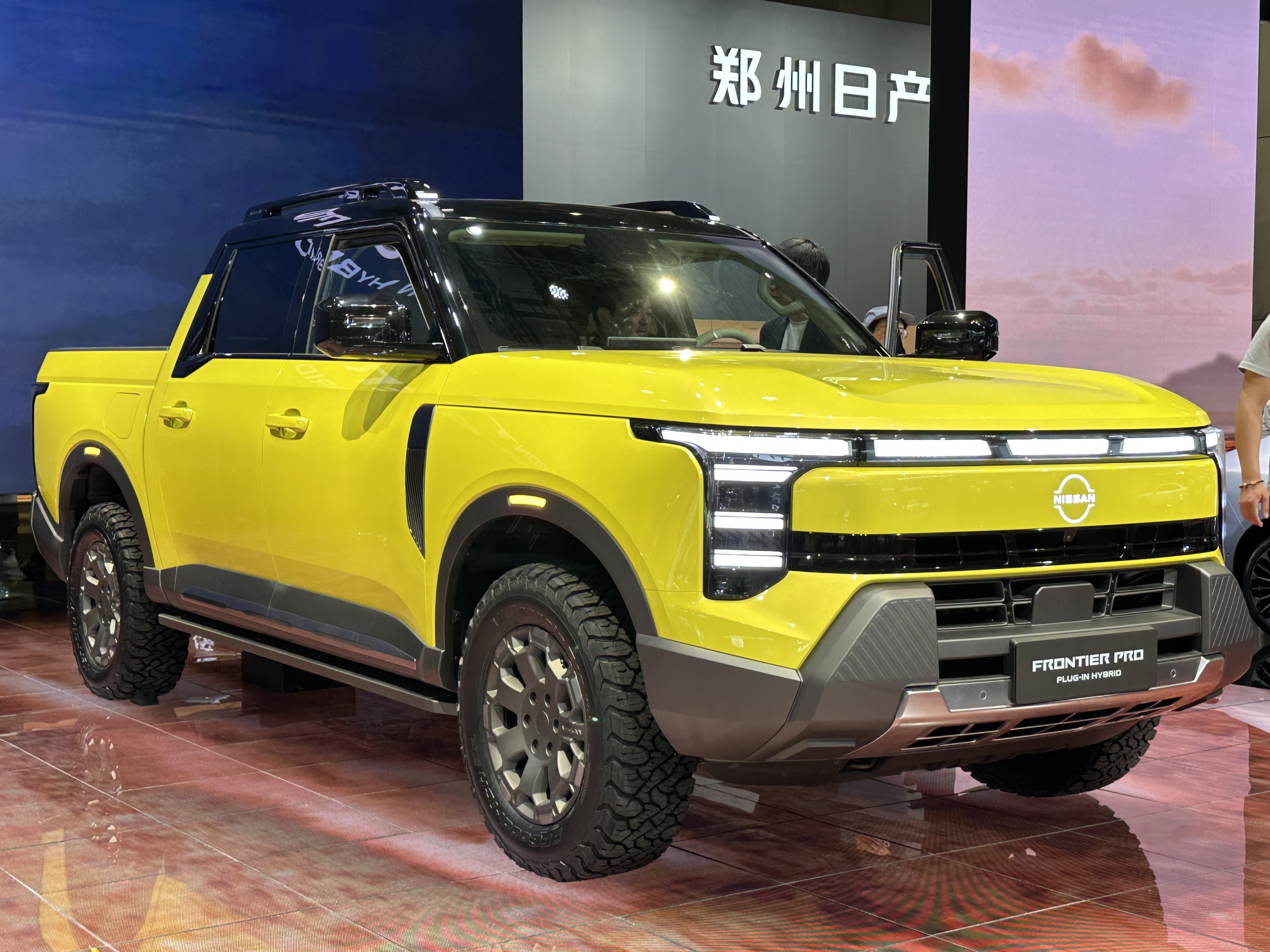
Nissan Frontier Pro
