= Auto Shanghai =

Chinese biennial automobile show

Shanghai International Automobile Industry Exhibition 上海国际汽车工业展览会

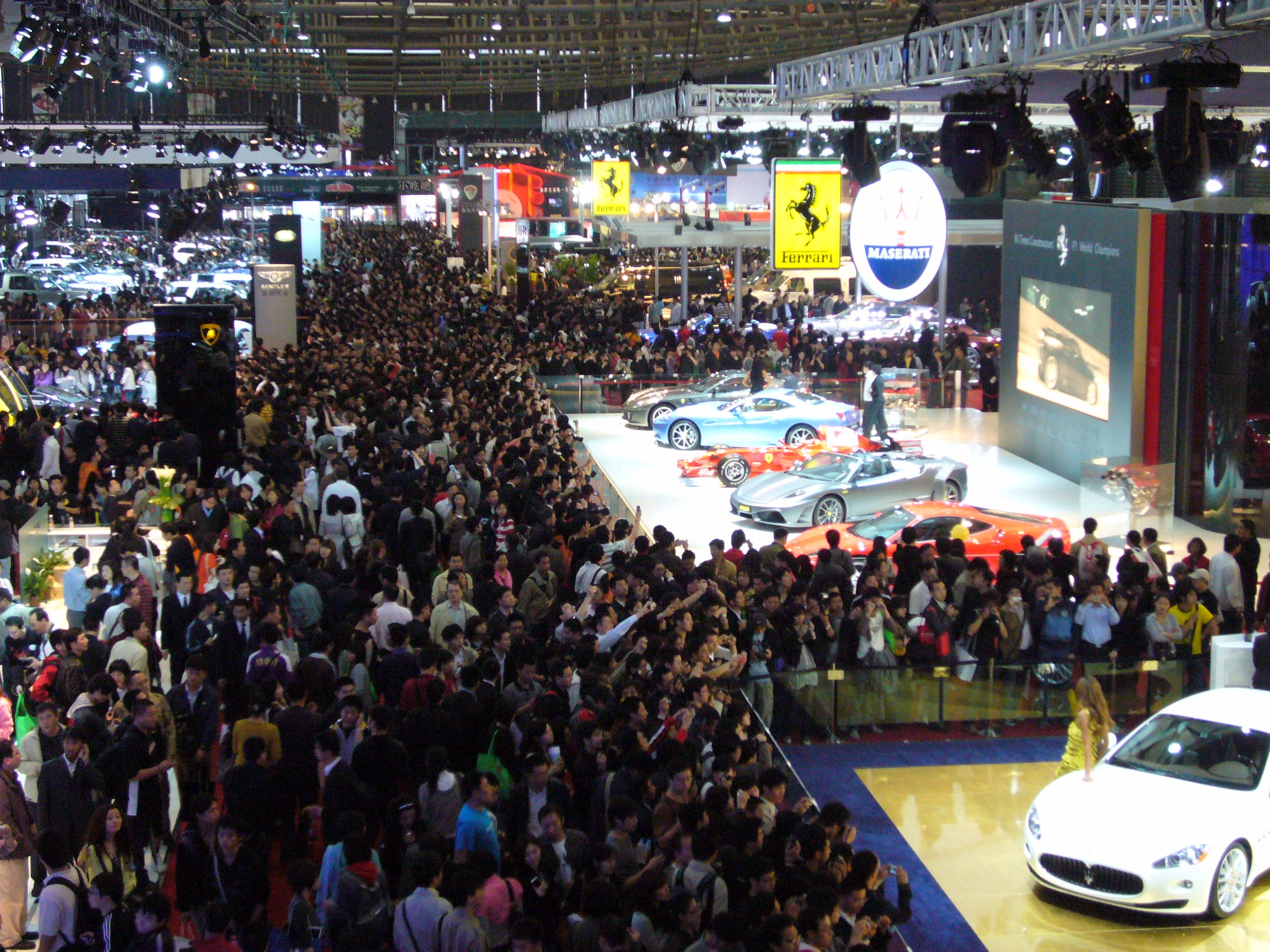
- Auto Shanghai 2009
- Status: Active
- Genre: Auto show
- Begins: 1985; 41 years ago
- Frequency: Biennial
- Venue: National Center for Exhibition and Convention (Shanghai)
- Country: China
- Years active: 1985–present
- Organiser: China Council for the Promotion of International Trade Shanghai (CCPIT Shanghai) and China Association of Automobile Manufacturers (CAAM); co-organised with Messe München (Germany)
- Website: Official Chinese; International

Auto Shanghai (Chinese: 上海国际汽车展), officially known as the Shanghai International Automobile Industry Exhibition (Chinese: 上海国际汽车工业展览会), is a biennial international automobile show that alternates with the Beijing Auto Show (Auto China) as China's yearly international automotive exhibition. First held in 1985, Auto Shanghai is the nation's oldest auto exhibition, and is considered as an important major international auto show.

Due to the greatly expanding presence of foreign brands in the Chinese markets, Auto Shanghai has become one of the premier international auto shows alongside Detroit, Frankfurt, Paris and Tokyo, and was also the first Chinese auto show to join the Union des Foires Internationales (UFI). Since 2015, the show is hosted at the National Center for Exhibition and Convention, located next to the Shanghai Hongqiao International Airport.

== 2025 ==
The 2025 show ran from 23 April to 2 May.

- 23–24 April — Press days
- 25–26 April — Industry days
- 27 April–2 May — Open to public

The event showcased 1,366 vehicles on display, including 163 world premieres, and covered more than 360,000 square metres of exhibition space. Nearly 1,010,000 visitors from around the world attended the show, including approximately 63,000 overseas visitors from 97 countries and regions. Visitors were able to see a wide range of new energy vehicles, which accounted for over 70% of the vehicles on display, and participating companies included nearly 1,000 domestic and international exhibitors from 26 countries and regions.

=== Introductions ===
- Aion L4 concept
- Aion Pickup 01 concept
- AITO M8
- AITO M9 update
- Arcfox 77° concept
- Arcfox αS5 update
- Arcfox T1
- Audi A5L
- Audi A6L e-tron
- Audi Q5L
- Audi Q6L e-tron
- Audi Q6L e-tron Sportback
- AUDI E5 Sportback
- Avatr 06
- Baojun Xiangjing
- Beijing BJ40 Red Hare Edition
- Bentley Continental GT/GTC Azure (China debut)
- Bentley Flying Spur Azure facelift (China debut)
- Bestune Yueyi 07
- Bestune Yueyi 08
- BMW 3 Series 50th Anniversary Limited Edition
- BMW M4 Competition Nürburgring Limited Edition
- BMW Vision Driving Experience concept
- Buick Electra GS concept
- Buick Electra MPV Precursor concept
- Buick Electra Sedan Precursor concept
- Buick Electra SUV Precursor concept
- Buick GL8 Encasa
- Buick GL8 Lu Shang
- BYD Dynasty-D concept
- BYD Qin L EV
- BYD Qin Plus DM-i facelift
- BYD Yuan Plus facelift
- BYD Dolphin facelift
- BYD Seagull facelift
- BYD Seal 06 DM-i Touring
- BYD Seal 06 EV
- BYD Sealion 05 EV
- BYD Sealion 06 EV & DM-i
- BYD Sealion 07 DM
- BYD Ocean-S concept
- Cadillac Escalade IQ (China debut)
- Cadillac Lyriq-V (China debut)
- Cadillac Vistiq (China debut)
- Changan CS55 Plus update
- Changan Eado update
- Changan Nevo Hunter K50 (China debut)
- Changan Nevo Q07
- Changan UNI-V update
- Chery Fulwin A9L
- Chery Fulwin T11
- Chery Himla
- Chery QQ Qurio concept
- Chery Tiggo 9L
- Chery iBar
- Deepal S09
- Denza Z concept
- Exeed Sterra ES EV facelift
- Exeed Sterra Phecda concept
- Firefly
- Ford Bronco Retro edition (China debut)
- Ford F-150 Raptor facelift (China debut)
- Forthing Xinghai S7 EREV
- Geely Galaxy Cruiser Concept
- Geely Galaxy Xingyao 8
- Geely Boyue L facelift
- Great Wall Motor INEST 4.0 concept
- Great Wall Shanhai Cannon Hi4-T
- Great Wall Souo S2000
- Honda GT
- Hongqi E-QM5 facelift
- Hongqi H5 PHEV
- Hongqi H9
- Hongqi HS9
- Hongqi Off-road vehicle concept
- Hongqi Tiangong 06
- Hyptec Earth concept
- iCar V23 pickup concept
- iCar V23 convertible concept
- Infiniti QX80 (third generation) (China debut)
- JAC DEFINE-S concept
- JAC DEFINE-X concept
- Jaecoo J5 EV
- Jetour Freedom
- Jetour Reaolc (entered production as the Rely Reaolc)
- Jetour Shanhai L7 Plus
- Jetour Shanhai L9
- Jetour Shanhai T1 PHEV AWD
- Jetour Shanhai T2 LWB
- Jetour JMK Traveller Interstellar Guard
- Jetour Zongheng G600
- Jetour Zongheng G700
- Jetour Zongheng G900
- Jetour Zongheng F700
- Lamborghini Temerario (China debut)
- Leapmotor B01
- Lexus ES (eighth generation)
- Li L6 update
- Li Mega Home
- Lincoln Nautilus Atlantis Limited Edition
- Lincoln Navigator (China debut)
- Luxeed R7 EREV
- Luxeed S7 Ultra
- Maextro S800
- Mazda EZ-60
- Mercedes-AMG GT 63 4MATIC+ (China debut)
- Mercedes-Benz CLA L
- Mercedes-Benz Vision V concept
- MG Cyber X concept
- MG Cyberster GTS
- M-Hero M817
- M-Hero 917 Jiaolong Armor
- Mini Aceman JCW
- Mini Cooper Cabrio (China debut)
- Mini Cooper EV JCW (China debut)
- Lorinser M900 Star Wars Limited Edition
- Nammi 06
- Nissan Frontier Pro
- Nissan N7
- Omoda C5 SHS facelift
- Omoda C7
- Onvo L90
- Ora Lightning Cat Touring
- Porsche 911 GT3/GT3 RS facelift (China debut)
- Porsche 911 Spirit 70
- Radar Horizon EM-i
- Roewe D6
- Roewe Pearl concept
- Small Sports Car SC01 (JMEV 01)
- Smart #5 Brabus
- Stelato S9 EREV
- Tank 300 Huke Edition
- Toyota bZ5
- Toyota bZ7
- Toyota Century GRMN
- Trumpchi Xiangwang M8 Qiankun PHEV
- Trumpchi Xiangwang S9
- Volkswagen ID.3 GTX (Chinese debut)
- Volkswagen ID. Aura concept
- Volkswagen ID. Era concept
- Volkswagen ID. Evo concept
- Volkswagen ID. UNYX 06 facelift
- Volkswagen Talagon facelift
- Volvo XC60 facelift (China debut)
- Volvo XC90 facelift (China debut)
- Voyah Dreamer Shanhe
- Voyah FREE+
- Wey Gaoshan 8
- Wey Gaoshan 9
- Wuling Starlight facelift
- Wuling Starlight S
- XPeng P7+ update
- Yangwang U8L
- Zeekr 007 GT (7GT)
- Zeekr 9X

== 2023 ==
The 2023 show ran from 18 April to 27 April. As many as 1,200 models and 1,413 vehicles were displayed at the show, with 93 global debuts, 64 concept cars and 271 new energy vehicles, 186 of which were from indigenous Chinese brands.

- 18–19 April — Press day
- 20–27 April — Open to the public

=== Introductions ===
- Arcfox α-S
- Arcfox α-T
- BMW i7 M70 xDrive
- Buick Electra E5
- BYD Destroyer 07
- BYD Seagull
- BYD Song L Concept
- Chery Arrizo 8 C-DM
- Chery Arrizo Star
- Chery TJ-1C-DM
- Chery Tiggo 9 C-DM
- Deepal S7
- Denza N7
- Denza D9
- Exeed Sterra ES
- Exeed Sterra ET
- Great Wall Shanhai Cannon HEV
- Great Wall Shanhai Cannon PHEV
- Haval Xiaolong
- Haval Xiaolong Max
- Honda e:NP2
- Honda e:NS2
- Honda e：N SUV
- Hongqi E001
- Hongqi H6
- Hongqi L5
- Hycan V09
- Hyundai Elantra N facelift
- Hyundai Mufasa
- iCar 03
- iCar GT
- JAC QX PHEV
- JAC Yiwei 3
- JMC Da Dao
- Jetta VS7 ABT
- Lexus LM
- Lexus RX Outdoor Concept
- Lexus ROV 2 Concept
- Lexus RZ Outdoor Concept
- Maxus GST concept
- MG Cyberster
- Maserati Grecale Folgore
- Mercedes-Maybach EQS SUV
- Neta GT
- Nio ES6
- Nissan Pathfinder Concept
- Nissan Arizon
- Ora Ballet Cat
- Peugeot Inception Concept EV
- Polestar 4
- Porsche Cayenne facelift
- Skyworth EV6 II
- Skyworth HT-i II
- Smart 3
- Tank 400 PHEV
- Toyota bZ FlexSpace concept
- Toyota bZ Sport Crossover concept
- Toyota bZ3
- Toyota Crown Sedan
- Volkswagen ID.7
- Volvo EX90 Excellence
- Wey Gaoshan DHT-PHEV
- Wey Lanshan DHT-PHEV
- XPeng G6
- Yangwang U8
- Yangwang U9
- Zeekr X

== 2021 ==
The 2021 show ran from 19 April to 28 April. It was the first major auto show to be held since the start of the COVID-19 pandemic.

- 19–20 April — Press day
- 21–28 April — Open to the public

=== Introductions ===
- Aeolus Yixuan Max
- Arcfox Alpha-S
- Audi A6 e-tron concept
- Audi A7L
- Audi Q2L and Audi Q2L e-tron facelift
- Audi Q5L facelift
- Baojun Valli
- Bestune T55
- Buick Envision Plus
- Buick Verano Pro
- Cadillac Lyriq concept (public debut)
- Changan CS55 Plus
- Citroën C5 X
- Exeed Stellar Concept
- Ford Equator
- Ford Evos
- Ford Mustang Mach-E (Changan Ford version)
- Geely Emgrand S (Geely Emgrand GS facelift)
- Geely Xingyue L
- Genesis G80
- Genesis Electrified G80
- Genesis GV80
- Genesis X
- Haval X Dog Concept
- Haval XY Concept
- Honda Breeze plug-in hybrid
- Honda SUV e: Prototype
- Hongqi L-Concept
- Hongqi S9 production version
- Hyundai Ioniq 5
- IM Airo concept
- IM L7
- IM LS7 concept
- Kia EV6 (public debut)
- Kia Carnival
- Kia Sportage Ace
- Kia K3 EV
- Lexus ES (facelift)
- Lexus LF-Z Electrified concept
- Lincoln Corsair PHEV (Asian debut)
- Lincoln Zephyr Reflection concept
- Lynk & Co 02 Sport increased horsepower version of the 02
- Maserati Levante Hybrid
- Mazda CX-30 EV
- Mercedes-Benz C-Class L extended wheelbase version of the new C-class
- Mercedes-Benz EQB
- Mercedes-Benz EQS 450+ and 580 4MATIC
- MG Cyberster concept
- Modern IN, first model of a BAW sub-brand
- Nissan X-Trail (T33)
- ORA Big Cat
- ORA Lightning Cat prototype
- ORA Punk Cat prototype
- Roewe i5 / Ei5 facelift
- Roewe Jing
- Škoda Octavia Pro extended wheelbase version of the 2020 Octavia
- TANK 300
- TANK 300 Cybertank concept
- Tank 700
- Tank 800
- Toyota bZ4X
- Toyota Highlander IV / Crown Kluger
- Volkswagen ID.6 Crozz (FAW-Volkswagen) / X (SAIC-Volkswagen version)
- Volkswagen Passat SAIC-VW version facelift
- Volkswagen Talagon
- Weltmeister W6
- Wuling Hongguang Mini EV Cabrio concept
- Wuling Xingchen
- Xpeng P5
- Zeekr 001, production version based on the Lynk & Co zero concept
- ZX Auto ZTE G9

== 2019 ==
The 2019 show ran from 16 April to 25 April.

- 16–17 April — Press day
- 18–25 April — Open to the public

=== Introductions ===
- Aion LX
- Aiways U5
- Aiways U7 Ion Concept
- Alfa Romeo Giulia Quadrifoglio NRING
- Alfa Romeo Stelvio Quadrifoglio NRING
- Aston Martin Lagonda All-Terrain Concept (Asian debut)
- Aston Martin AM-RB 003 Concept (Asian debut)
- Aston Martin Rapide E
- Audi AI:me Concept
- Audi Q2 L e-tron
- Audi Q3 (Asian debut)
- BAIC Arcfox ECF
- BAIC Arcfox-GT Race Edition
- Baojun RM-C Concept
- Baojun RS-5
- Bentley Continental GT Convertible (Asian debut)
- Bentley Mulsanne W.O. Edition by Mulliner (Asian debut)
- BMW 3 Series Li (G28)
- BMW 745e, 745Le & 745Le xDrive
- BMW M850i xDrive Coupé
- BMW X1 xDrive25Le (F49)
- BMW X3 M Competition
- BMW X4 M Competition
- BMW X7 (Asian debut)
- BMW Vision iNext Concept (Asian debut)
- Bordrin iV7
- Brabus 800G
- Buick Encore
- Buick Encore GX
- Buick GL8 Avenir Concept
- Buick LaCrosse (facelift)
- Buick Velite 6 EV
- BYD e2
- BYD e-Seed GT Concept
- BYD Song Pro
- Cadillac XT6 (Asian debut)
- Changan CS75 Plus
- Chevrolet Onix
- Chevrolet Tracker
- Chevrolet Trailblazer
- Ciimo X-NV Concept
- Citroën C3-XR (facelift)
- Enovate ME7
- Enovate ME-S Concept
- Ford Escape CN-Spec.
- Geely Jiaji
- Geely Preface Concept
- Geely Xingyue S
- Grove Granite
- Gumpert Nathalie Race
- Gyon Matchless Concept
- HanTeng Red 01 Concept
- Hezhong Eureka 02 Concept
- Honda Odyssey Sport Hybrid
- Hongqi E-HS3
- Hongqi H5 FCEV
- Hongqi H5 Sports
- Hongqi HS7
- Hyundai ix25
- Hyundai Sonata
- Hyundai Veloster N
- Icona Nucleus Concept (Asian debut)
- Infiniti Qs Inspiration Concept
- JAC iEV S4
- Jaguar I-Pace eTrophy
- Jeep Gladiator (Asian debut)
- Jeep Grand Commander PHEV
- Jetta VA3
- Jetta VS5
- Jetta VS7
- Karma Revero GT
- Karma Pininfarina GT Concept
- Karma SC1 Vision Concept
- Kia K3
- Lamborghini Huracán Evo (Asian debut)
- Lamborghini Urus
- Landwind Xiaoyao
- Leapmotor C-More concept
- Lexus LM
- Lotus Evora GT4 Concept
- Lynk & Co 01 (facelift)
- Maserati Levante GTS
- Maserati Levante Trofeo
- Maxus D60e
- Maxus G50
- Maxus T70
- Mazda MX-5 RF
- McLaren 600LT Spider (Asian debut)
- McLaren 720S Spider (Asian debut)
- Mercedes-AMG A35 L Sedan
- Mercedes-AMG E53 Coupé 4Matic
- Mercedes-AMG GT50 4-door Coupé
- Mercedes-Benz EQC (Asian debut)
- Mercedes-Benz Concept GLB
- Mercedes-Benz GLE (Asian debut)
- MG 6 (facelift)
- MG 6 XPower TCR Racecar Concept
- Mini Clubman (facelift)
- Mitsubishi e-Yi Concept
- Nissan IMQ Concept
- Nissan IMs Concept
- Nissan Sylphy
- Nio ES6
- Nio ET Preview Concept
- Ora R1
- Peugeot 508L
- Porsche 911 Carrera 4S Coupé & Cabriolet (Asian debut)
- Porsche Cayenne Coupé
- Qiantu Concept 2
- Qiantu K20
- Qiantu K25 Concept
- Qiantu K50 Spyder Concept
- Qoros Mile II Concept
- Range Rover Evoque II (Asian debut)
- Renault City K-ZE electric
- Renault Kadjar
- Roewe Marvel X Pro
- Roewe Vision-i Concept
- Rolls-Royce Cullinan
- Seres SF5
- Škoda Vision iV Concept (Asian debut)
- Toyota C-HR EV
- Toyota IZOA EV
- Toyota RAV4 Hybrid
- Volkswagen e-Lavida
- Volkswagen Polo Plus
- Volkswagen I.D. Roomzz Concept
- Volkswagen SMV Concept
- Volkswagen SUV Coupé Concept
- Volkswagen Teramont X
- W Motors MUSE Concept
- WEY VV5
- WEY X Concept
- Xpeng P7
- Zedriv GT3 EV Concept
- Zedriv GX5

== 2017 ==
The 2017 show ran from 19 April to 28 April.

- 19–20 April — Press & VIPs preview
- 21–23 April — Trade visitors preview
- 24–28 April — Open to the public

=== Introductions ===
- Acura TLX-L
- Aston Martin V8 Vantage S GB Edition
- Aston Martin Vanquish S Volante (Asian debut)
- Audi RS 3 LMS
- Audi RS5 Coupe (Asian debut)
- Audi R8 LMS Cup
- Audi e-tron Sportback Concept
- BMW 5 Series LWB
- BMW M4 CS
- BMW Concept X2 (Asian debut)
- BYD Dynasty Concept
- Chery Tiggo Sport Coupe Concept
- Chevrolet FNR-X Concept
- Chrysler Portal Concept
- Citroën C5 Aircross
- Ferrari 812 Superfast (Asian debut)
- Geely MPV Concept
- Honda CR-V Hybrid
- Hyundai ix35 (Chinese market facelift)
- Icona Vulcano Titanium
- Jaguar I-Pace Concept (Asian debut)
- Jeep Yuntu Concept
- Kia K2 Cross
- Kia Pegas
- Lamborghini Huracán Performante (Asian debut)
- Lexus NX (facelift)
- Lynk & Co 01 SUV
- Lynk & Co 03 Sedan Concept
- McLaren 720S (Asian debut)
- MG E-Motion Concept
- Mercedes-Benz Concept A Sedan
- Mercedes-Benz GLA 260 Sport
- Mercedes-AMG S63
- Mercedes-Benz S-Class (facelift)
- Mercedes-Maybach S680
- Mini Countryman JCW (Asian debut)
- NIO EP9
- NIO ES8
- NIO Eve Concept
- Nissan Kicks
- Pininfarina Hybrid Kinetic K550/ K750
- Porsche Panamera Sport Turismo (Asian debut)
- Qiantu K50
- Qoros K-EV Concept
- Renault R.S. 2027 Vision Concept Formula One
- Škoda Vision E Concept
- Tesla Model 3
- Toyota Fun Sedan Concept
- VLF Force 1 V10 Roadster
- Volkswagen Phideon PHEV
- Volkswagen I.D. Crozz Concept
- Volkswagen C-Trek

== 2015 ==
=== Introductions ===
- Aston Martin Lagonda Taraf (Asian debut)
- Audi Prologue Allroad Concept
- Cadillac CT6 Plug-in Hybrid
- Chevrolet FNR Concept
- Ford Taurus
- Honda Concept D
- Hyundai Tucson Concept
- Hyundai County Chinese Spec - Later inspired to Hyundai County facelift in 2020.
- Lexus ES
- McLaren 540C Coupe
- Mercedes-Benz Concept GLC Coupe
- Nissan Lannia
- Peugeot 308 R Hybrid
- Qiantu K50
- Qoros 2 SUV Concept
- Rolls-Royce Phantom Limelight Collection
- Volkswagen C Coupe GTE Concept
- Volvo XC90 Excellence
- W Motors Lykan Hypersport

== 2013 ==
=== Introductions ===
- Acura SUV-X Concept
- Audi A6L
- BAIC Concept 900
- BMW X4 Concept
- Buick Riviera Concept
- Chery B13/M14
- Chevrolet Aveo and 'Aveo Xtreme'
- Detroit Electric SP:01
- Citroën DS Wild Rubis Concept
- Ford Mondeo
- Honda Concept M
- Honda Jade
- Hongqi HQD concept
- Hyundai Mistra
- Icona Vulcano Concept (Asian debut)
- KIA Cub Concept
- Lamborghini Aventador LP720-4 50° Anniversario
- Maserati Ghibli
- Mercedes-Benz GLA Concept
- MG CS Concept
- Nissan Friend-Me Concept
- Peugeot 301
- Spyker 'La Turbie
- Suzuki Authentics Concept
- Volkswagen CrossBlue Coupe Concept

== 2011 ==
=== Introductions ===
- Audi A3 e-tron Concept
- BMW Concept M5
- Buick Envision Concept
- Mercedes-Benz A-Class Concept
- Peugeot SXC Concept
- Subaru XV Concept
- Volvo Concept Universe

== See also ==
- Auto China
