= Kama Ruijie =

Series of vans and trucks

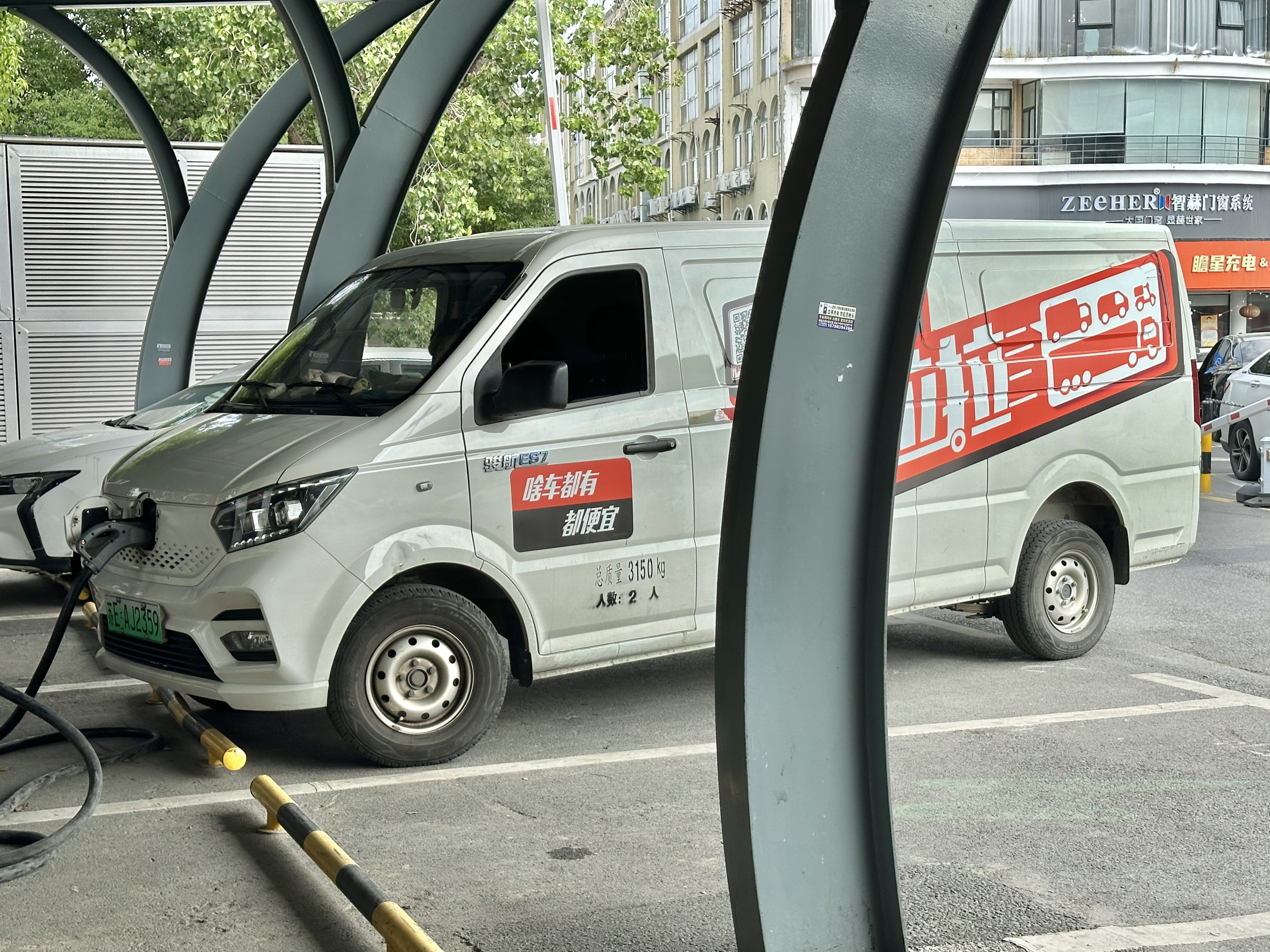

Overview
- Manufacturer: Kama Automobile Company
- Also called: Kama Ruijie S (锐捷S, electric van); Kama Junhang (骏航) ES6 (electric van); Kama Junhang (骏航) ES8 (long wheelbase electric van); Dongfeng W18 (pickup)/M08 (microvan); Dongfeng Captain W/Activan (microvan in Peru and Ecuador); Dongfeng (DFAC) Xiaobawang W18 (microtruck); Dongfeng Yufeng EM26 (electric van); Dongfeng Yufeng EM27 (electric van); King Long Longyao 6 (electric van); Naveco E-Luda (南京依维柯E路达, electric van); New Gonow Shuailing (electric van); Wanxiang T01/T02 (electric van); Foton Shidai/Zhiling EV6 (时代/智菱EV6, electric van); Foton Zhiling EV7 (智菱EV7, electric van); JAC Lanmao M2 (蓝猫M2, electric van); JMC Jingma E-Lufu (晶马 E-路福, electric van); Xinghaishi Ruichi (星海狮锐驰) ESP6/ESP7/ES7 (electric van); Xinghaishi Kuaiyunwang (星海狮快运王) V1/V2 (pickup); Yuchai NEV Yuda (玉柴新能源驭达) V6 (electric van); Zhongtong Auto (中通轻客) T6 (electric van); ARRA EW-1 (Mexico); Francisco Motors Harabas EV (Philippines)
- Production: 2019–present
- Assembly: China: Ganzhou

Body and chassis
- Class: Light commercial vehicle; Pickup truck
- Body style: 5-door wagon; 2-door pickup; 4-door pickup
- Layout: Longitudinal front-engine, rear-wheel drive

Powertrain
- Engine: 1.6 L DAM16KR I4 (petrol)
- Transmission: 5-speed manual

Dimensions
- Wheelbase: 3,050 mm (120.1 in); 3,450 mm (135.8 in) (Kama Junhang ES8)
- Length: 4,865 mm (191.5 in); 4,890 mm (192.5 in) (Wanxiang T01); 5,265 mm (207.3 in) (Kama Junhang ES8)
- Width: 1,715 mm (67.5 in); 1,870 mm (73.6 in) (Kama Junhang ES8)
- Height: 1,995 mm (78.5 in); 2,035 mm (80.1 in) (Wanxiang T01); 2,060 mm (81.1 in) (Kama Junhang ES8)
- Curb weight: 3,000–3,150 kg (6,614–6,945 lb)

The Kama Ruijie (Chinese: 凯马锐捷) is a series of vans and trucks produced since 2019 by Kama Automobile Company (山东凯马汽车制造有限公司). The Ruijie is available as the V and S series, with bodystyles including the V16 pickup and S6 sealed panel van.

The Kama Ruijie S6 sealed panel van is also the base vehicle for the Dongfeng Yufeng (东风御风) and Dongfeng Yufeng EM26 (东风御风 EM26) pure electric logistics panel van under the agreement between Kama and Dongfeng. The cooperation was between the Kama Automobile Company Ganzhou branch (凯马汽车制造有限公司赣州分公司) and Dongfeng Automobile Company New Energy Division (东风汽车股份有限公司新能源事业部), with Kama supplying the vehicle bodies and Dongfeng doing the final assembly. The final product was built for the logistics industry and is fully electric while sharing the design with the Ruijie panel van.

== Overview ==
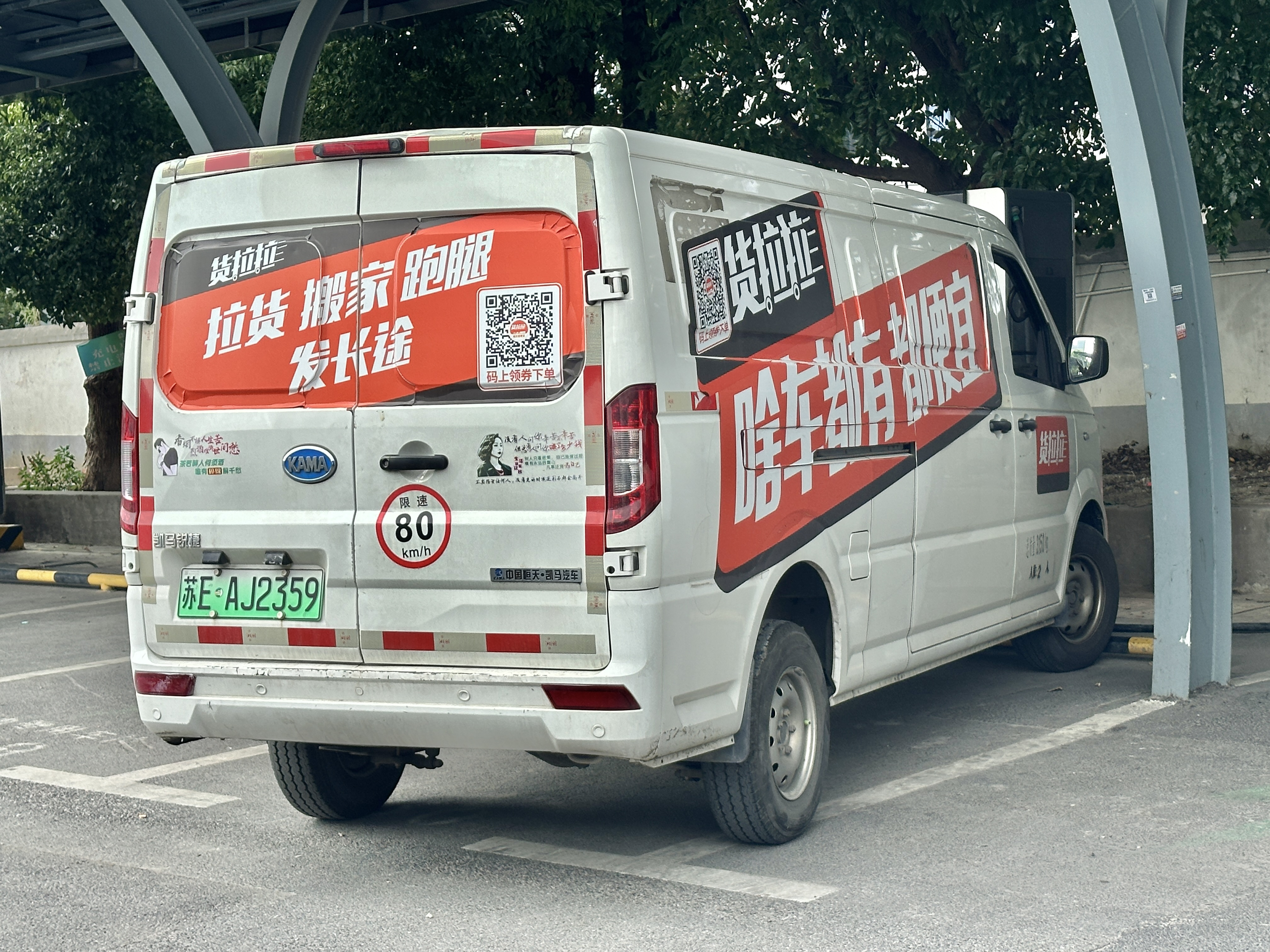
Rear view (Kama Ruijie S6 panel van based)

The Kama Ruijie panel vans feature 5.4 cubic meters of capacity and a 3050mm wheelbase for maximum cargo area, while the pickup variant features a 3600mm wheelbase. The Kama Ruijie is powered by a 1.6 liter "DAM16KR" engine supplied by Dongan and fulfills the Chinese National VI Emissions Standard developing 90KW and 158N·m.

An electric variant was sold as the Kama Ruijie S (锐捷S) with a variant sold as the Kama Junhang ES6 (骏航ES6), while the longest variant of the Kama van was rebadged as the Kama Junhang ES8 (骏航ES8), featuring a 3450mm wheelbase and a 5265mm length.

As of 2021, the Kama Ruijie panel vans are only available as electric variants while the V16 pickups are still offered as gasoline models.

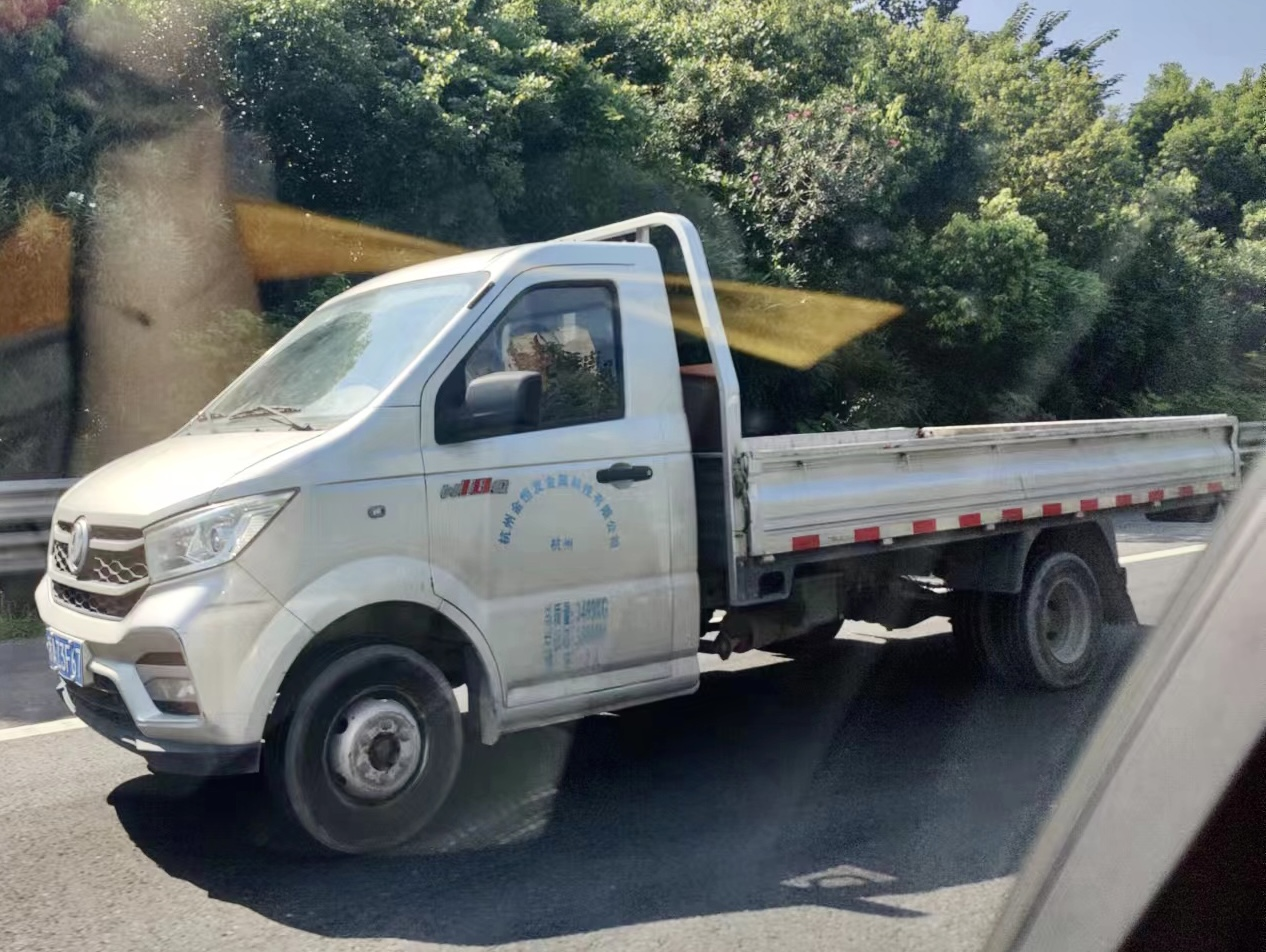
Dongfeng Xiaobawang W18Q

Dongfeng Automobile Co., Ltd. (DFAC) started exporting a passenger van based on the Yufeng EM26 panel van and DFAC Xiaobawang W18 micro truck codenamed the Dongfeng W18 or M08 to markets including Peru and Ecuador. The van is sold as the Dongfeng Captain W or Activan.

== Dongfeng Yufeng and Yufeng EM26 ==
The Dongfeng Yufeng and Dongfeng Yufeng EM26 (东风御风 EM26) pure electric logistics panel van sold by Dongfeng Automobile Company is a rebadged electric variant of the Kama Ruijie. The Dongfeng Yufeng EM26 has a 42 kWh Lithium Iron Phosphate Battery that is capable of a pure electric range of 220 km. The Yufeng EM26 has a top speed of 90 km/h.

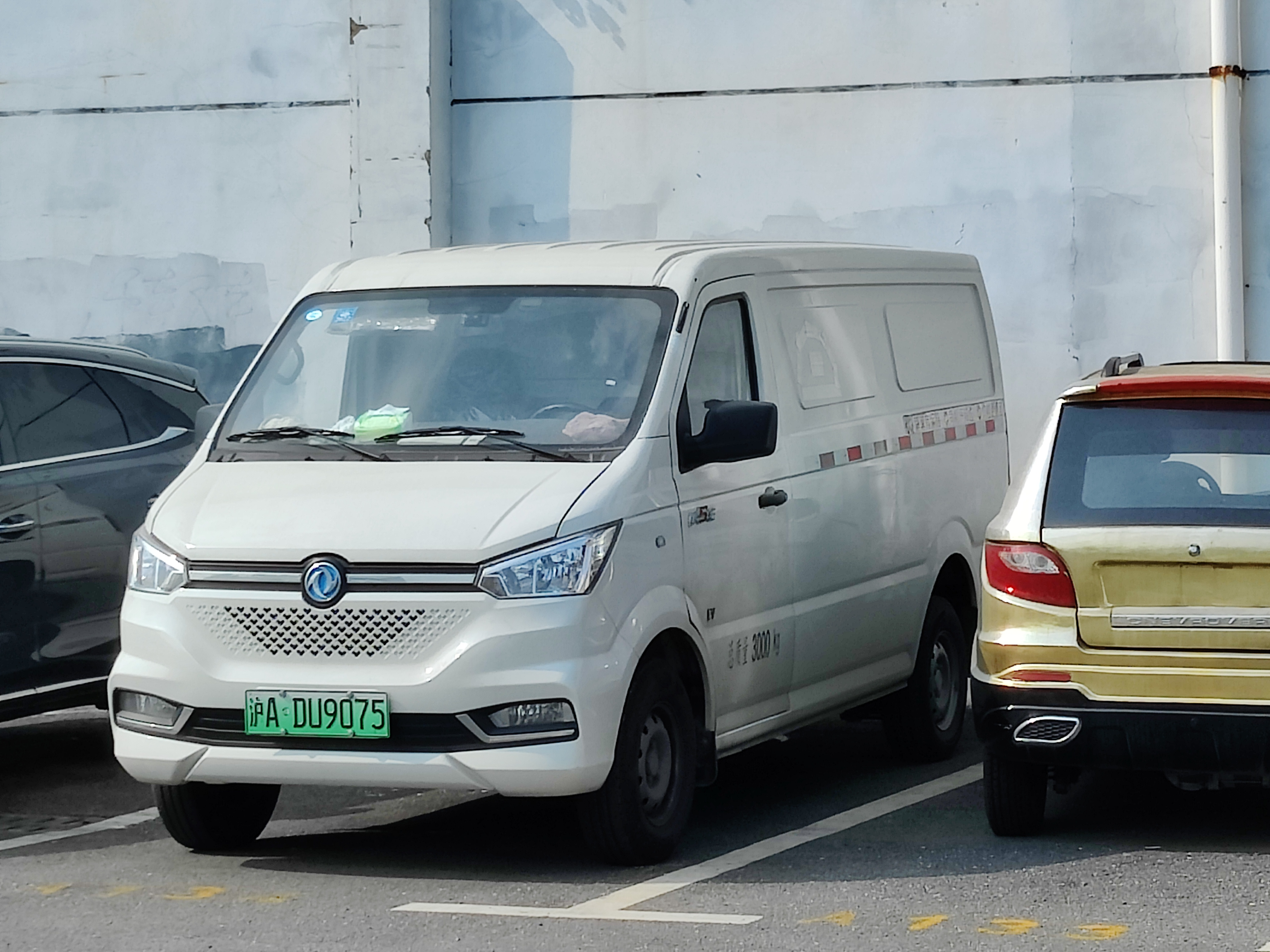
Dongfeng Yufeng EM26

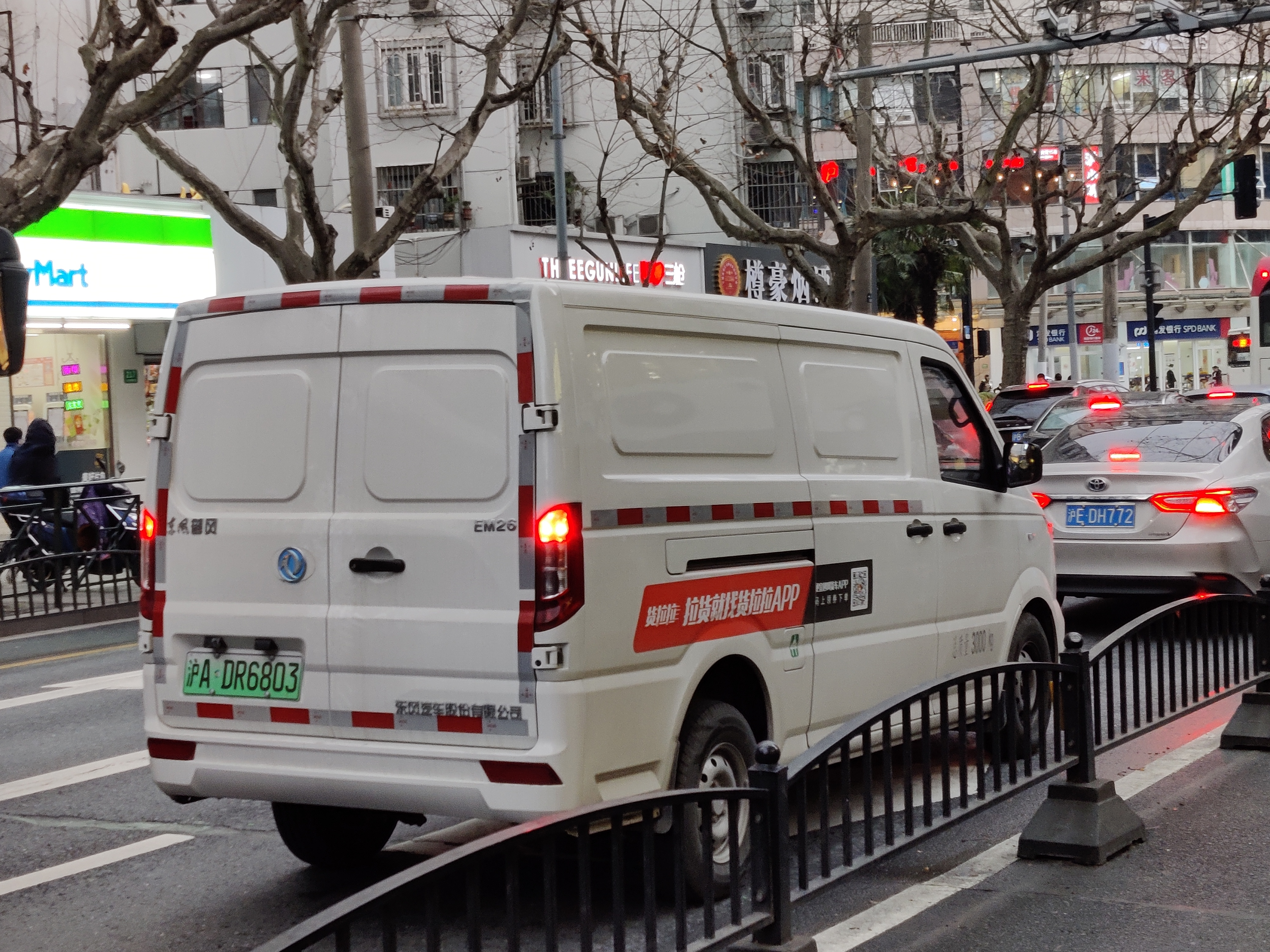
Rear view

== Dongfeng Yufeng EM27L ==
The Dongfeng Yufeng EM27L (东风御风 EM27L) pure electric logistics panel van sold by Dongfeng Automobile Company is a rebadged electric variant of the Kama Ruijie.

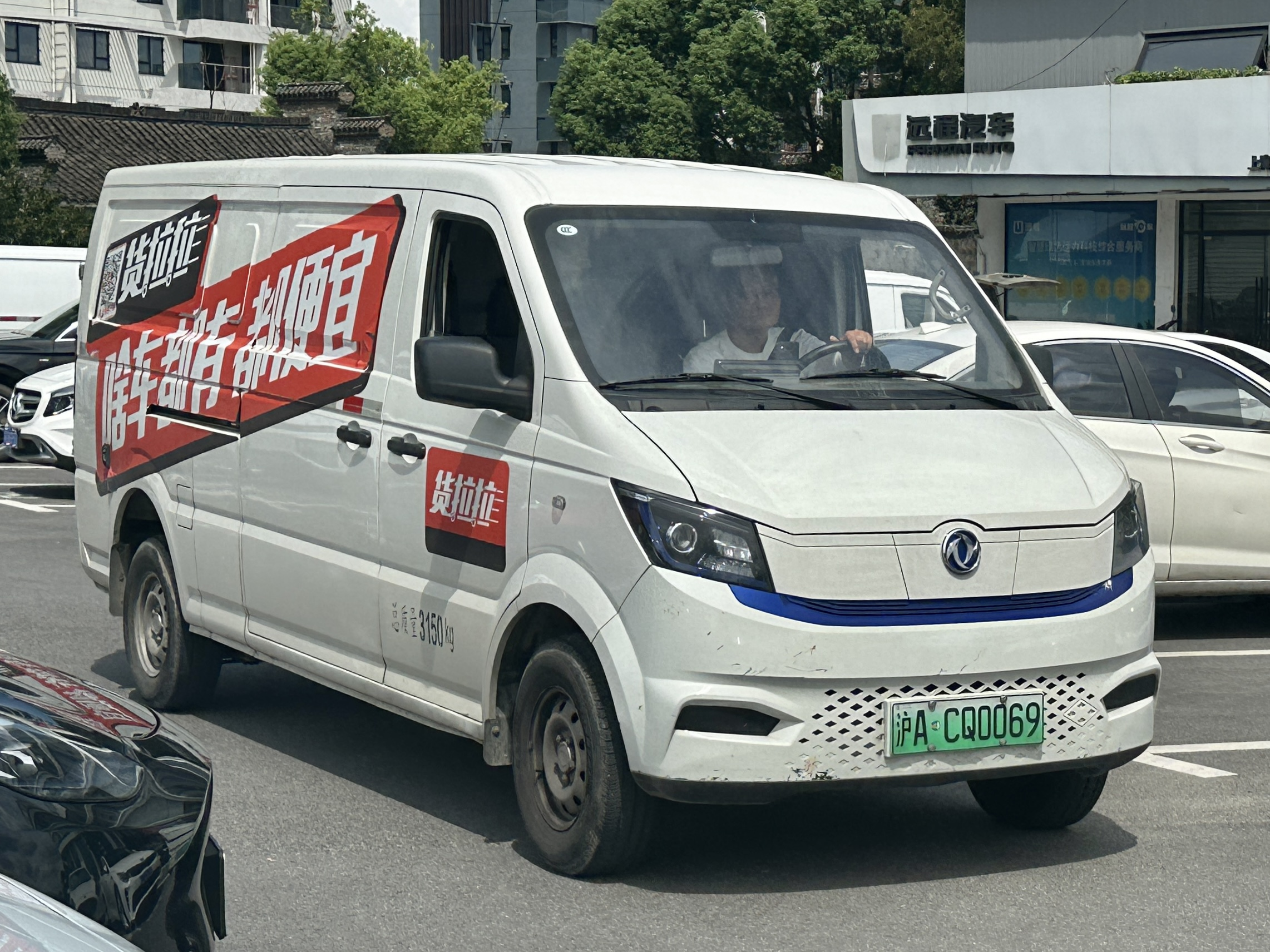
Dongfeng Yufeng EM27L

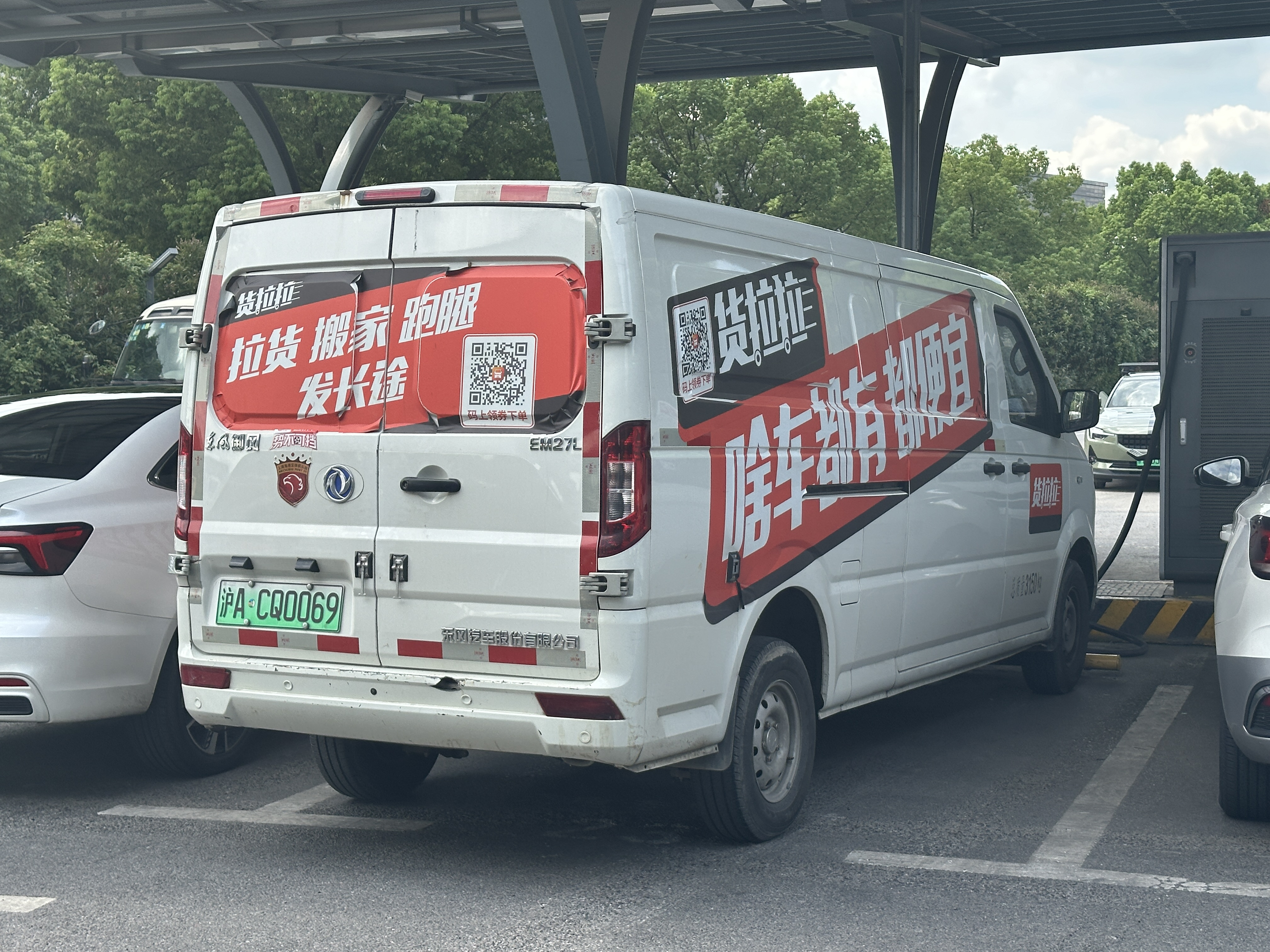
Rear view

== King Long Longyao 6 ==
The King Long Longyao 6 (厦门金龙 龙耀6) pure electric logistics panel van sold by King Long is a rebadged electric variant of the Kama Ruijie. The King Long Longyao 6 has a 38.64 kWh Lithium Iron Phosphate Battery that is capable of a pure electric range of 210 km. The power output is 70kW and 230N·m.

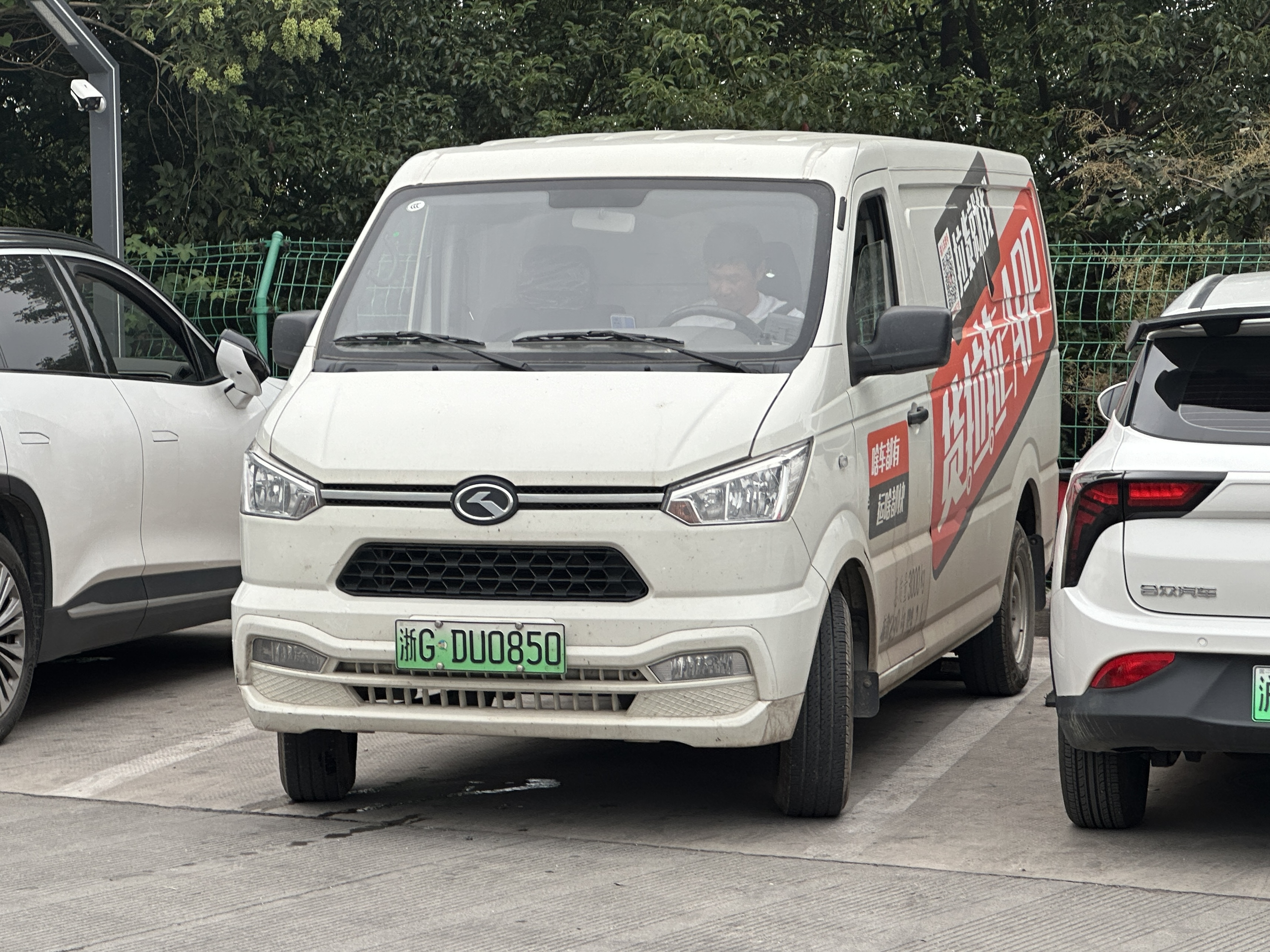
King Long Longyao 6

== New Gonow Shuailing ==
The New Gonow Shuailing (新吉奥 帅凌) pure electric logistics panel van sold by New Gonow is another rebadged electric variant of the Kama Ruijie. The New Gonow Shuailing has 41.6kWh and 49.8kWh Lithium Iron Phosphate Batteries that is capable of pure electric range of 290 km and 330 km respectively. The version produced by New Gonow features restyled front bumpers. New Gonow was founded in 2016 and only started to launch new products in the middle of 2021, with most businesses in the converted RV and camper market and electric logistics van market.

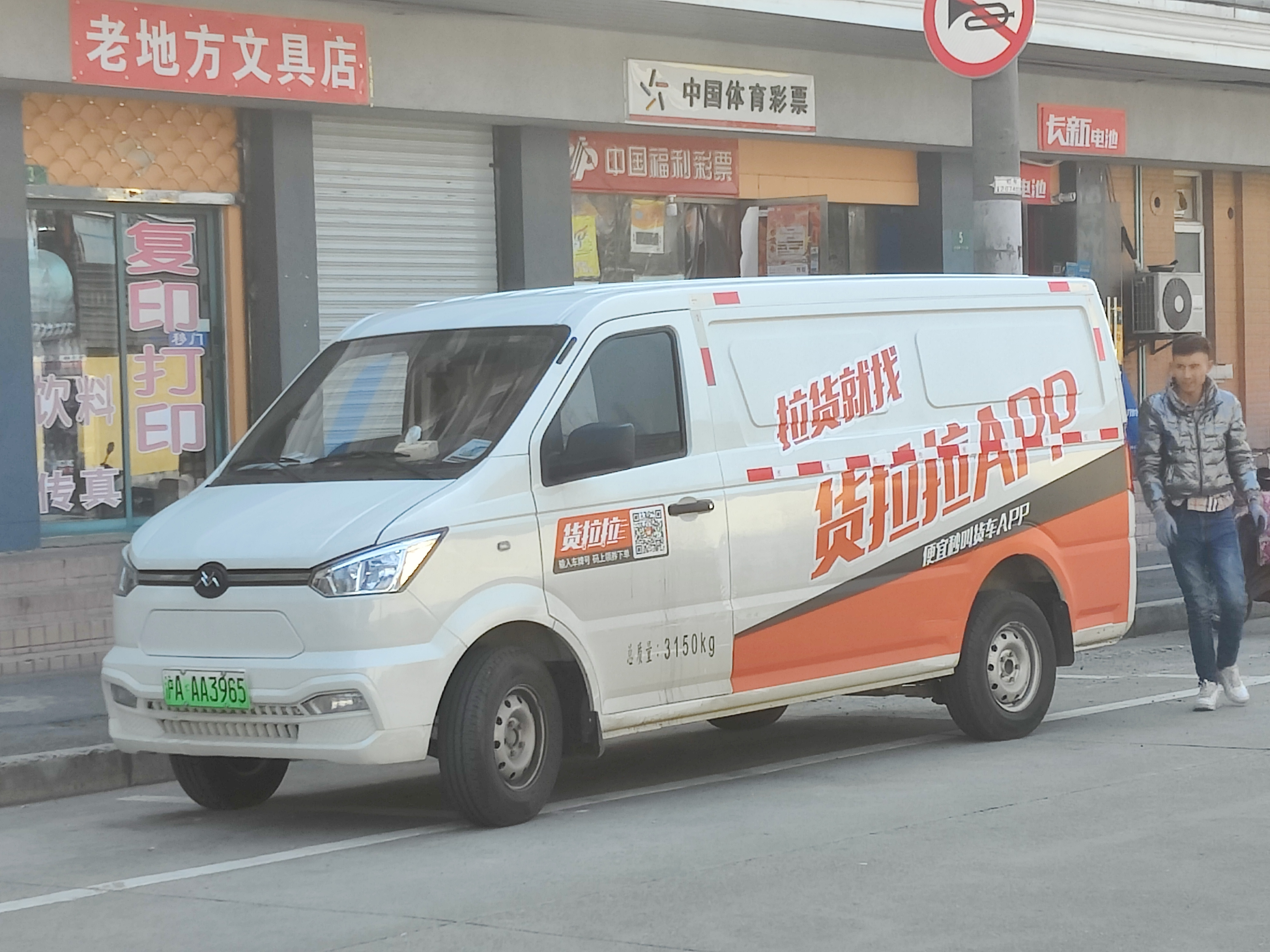
New Gonow Shuailing

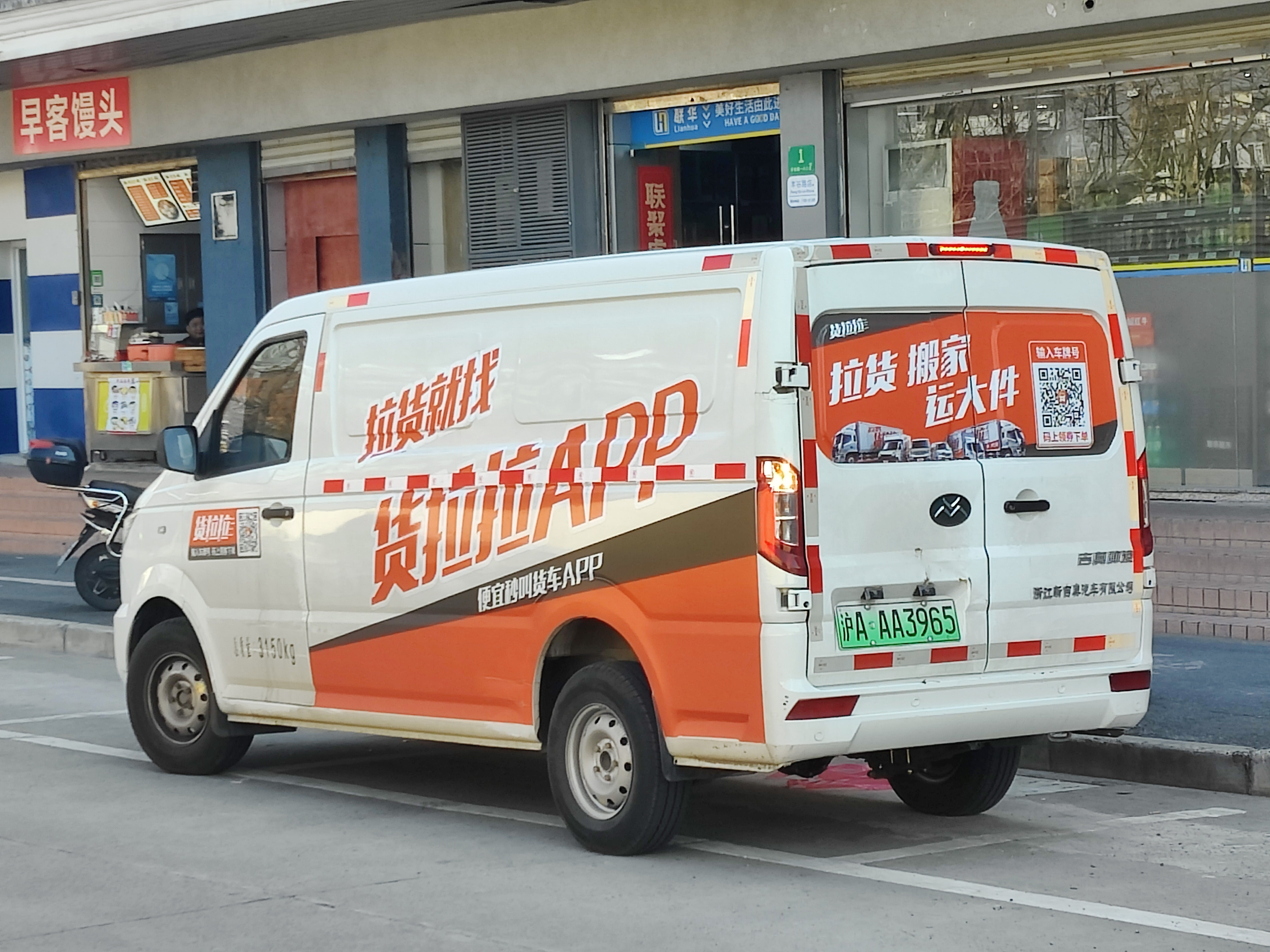
Rear view

== Wanxiang T01/T02 ==
The Wanxiang T01 (万象 T01) and Wanxiang T02 (万象 T02) pure electric logistics panel van sold by Shanghai Wanxiang Automobile Co., Ltd. is another rebadged electric variant of the Kama Ruijie. The Wanxiang T01 was launched in August 2022 with a completely restyled front end and tail lamps. The Wanxiang T01 has a 38.016kWh Lithium Iron Phosphate Batteries that is capable of pure electric range of 240 km. The electric motor has a maximum output of 70 kW and 230N·m.

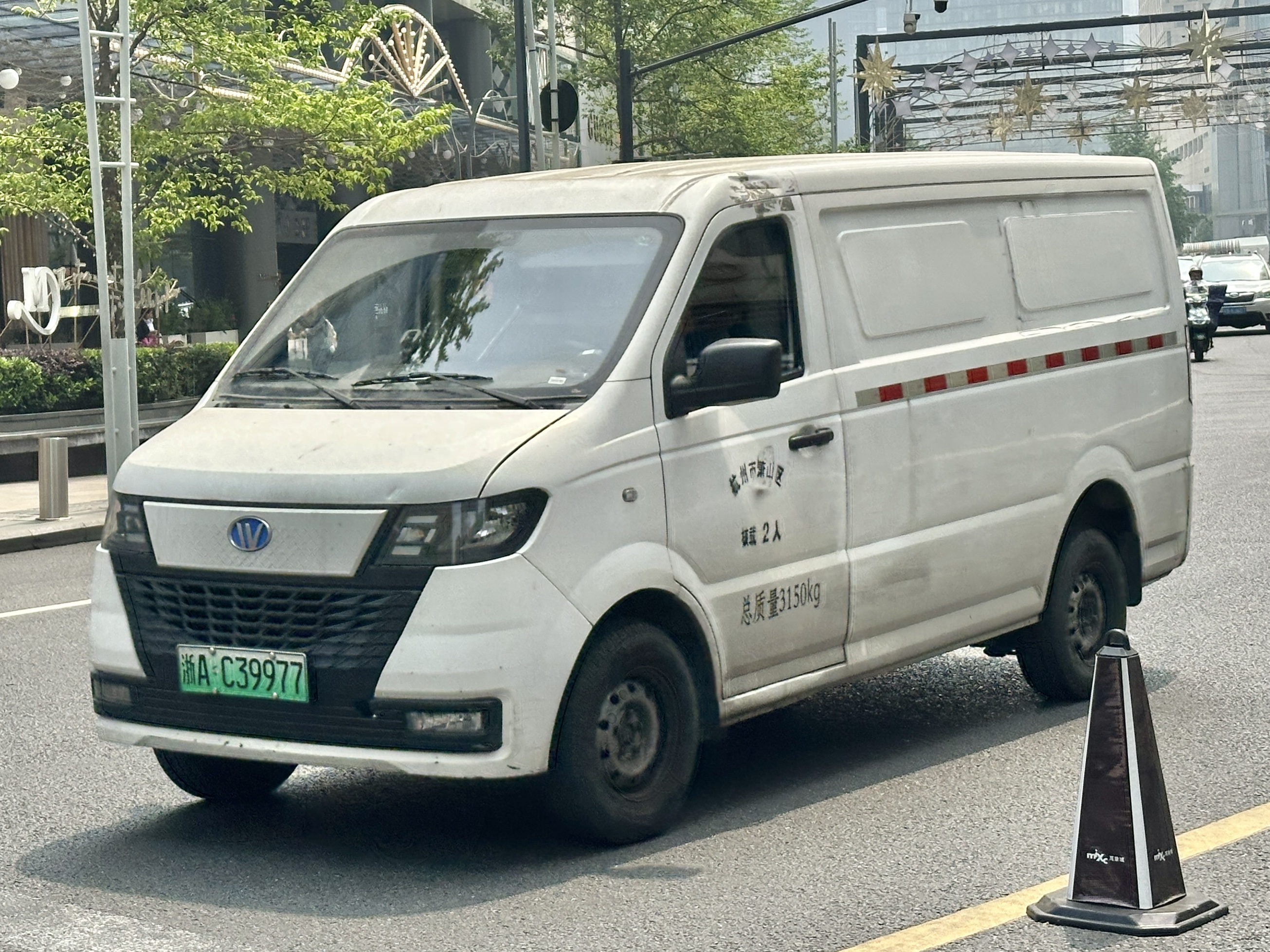
Wanxiang T01

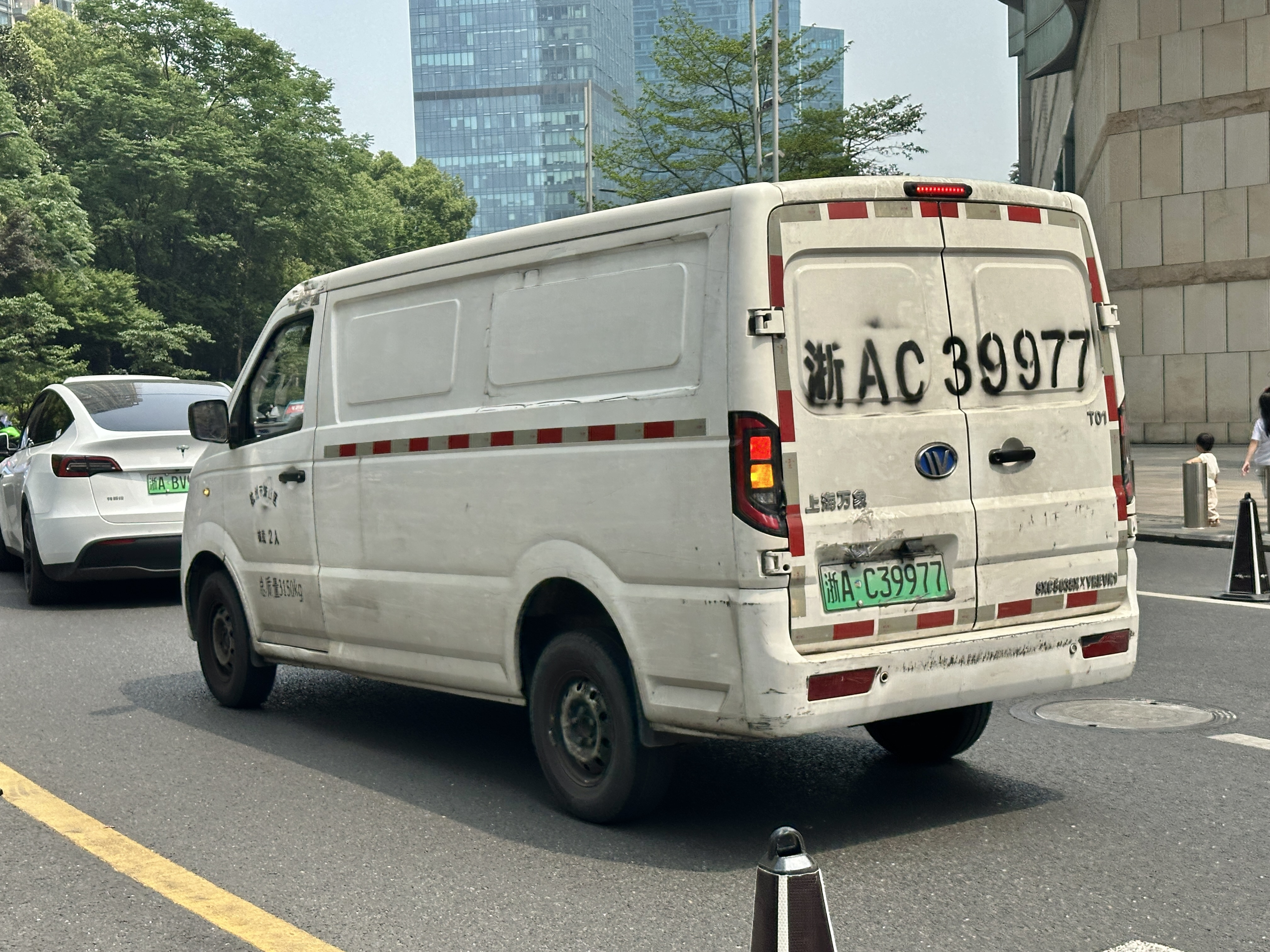
Rear view

== Foton Shidai EV6/Zhiling EV6 ==
The Foton Shidai EV6 (时代EV6) pure electric logistics panel van sold by Foton Motor is another rebadged electric variant of the Kama Ruijie. The Shidai EV6 was sold from 2023, and shares the same restyled front end and tail lamps with the Wanxiang T01. The exact same van was also sold through the Foton Xiangling (祥菱) sub-brand as the Zhiling (智菱) EV6.

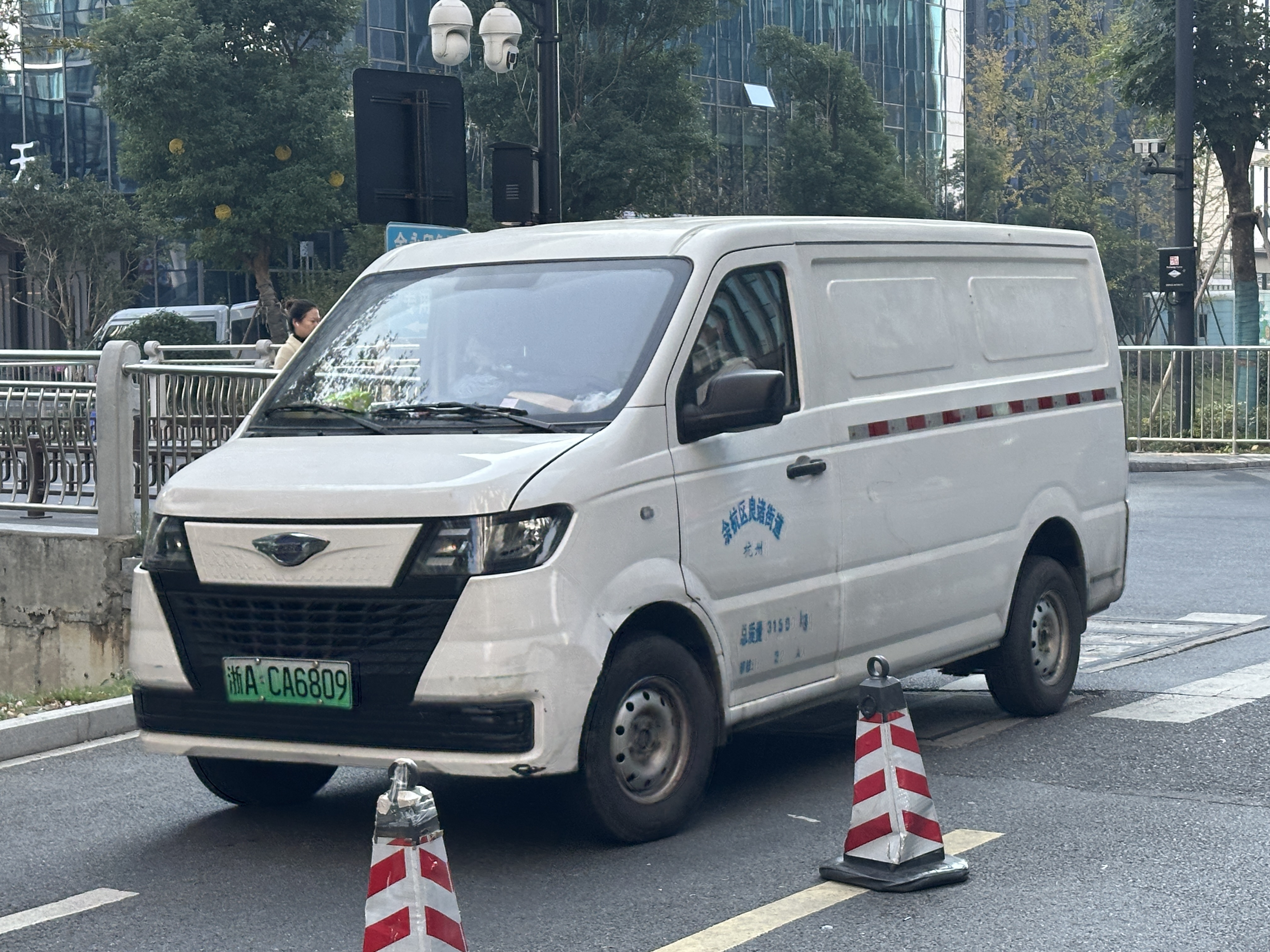
Foton Shidai EV6

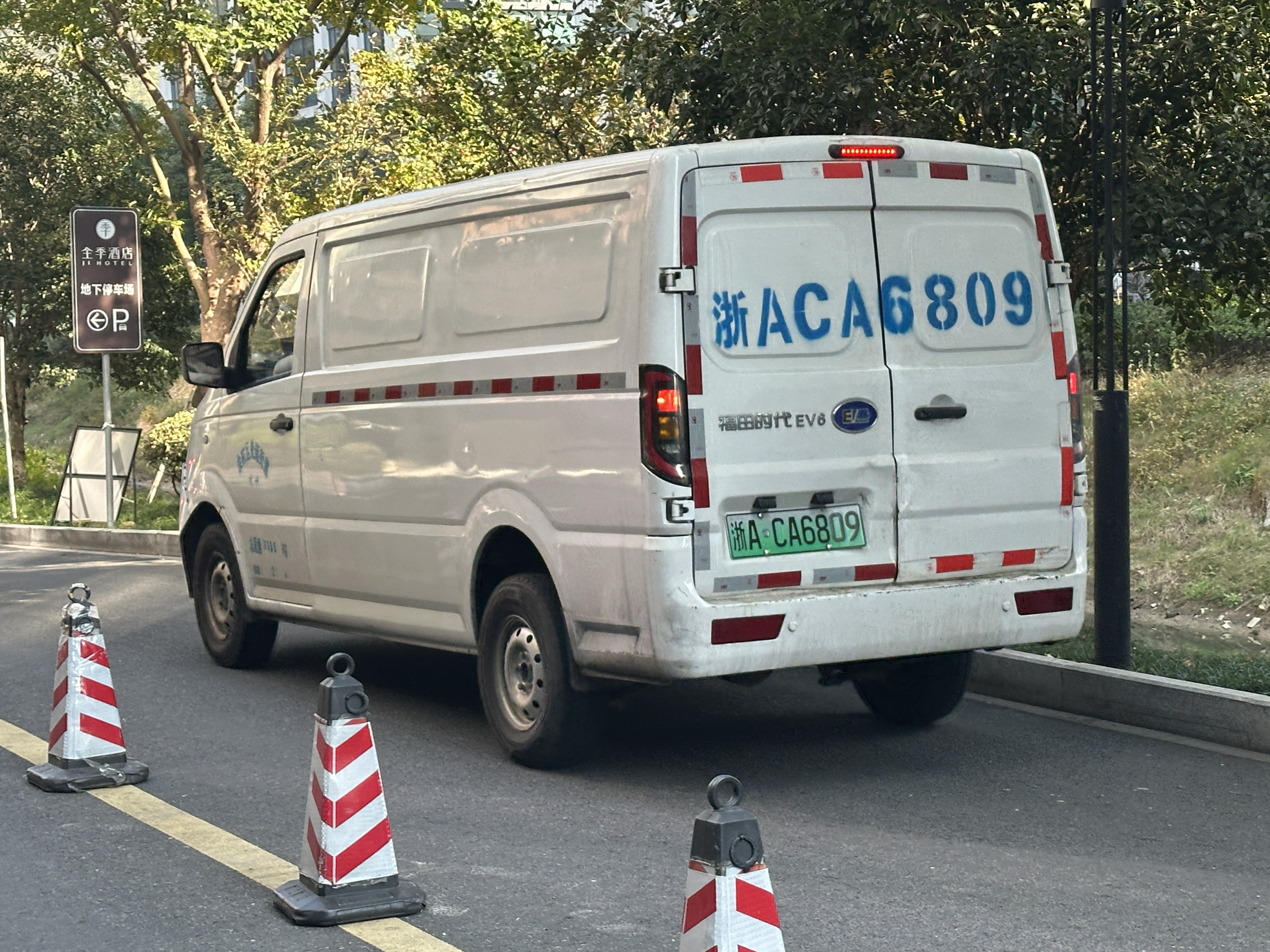
Rear view

== JAC Lanmao M2 ==
The JAC Lanmao M2 (蓝猫 M2) pure electric logistics panel van sold by JAC Motors is another rebadged electric variant of the Kama Ruijie. The JAC Lanmao M2 was launched in 2023 with a completely restyled front end and 41.93kWh batteries supplied by Gotion High-Tech.

== ARRA EW-1 ==
The ARRA EW-1 pure electric logistics panel van sold by ARRA is a rebadged electric variant of the Kama Ruijie and shares the styling with the Dongfeng Yufeng EM26. The ARRA is a NEV start up that sells rebadged Chinese electric vehicles in North America. The ARRA stands for "Advanced, Responsible and Renewable Automobiles", and was originally founded in Michigan, United States. The vehicles are assembled in a plant located near Shanghai, China. Selling alongside the ARRA 3, the EW-1 is the second product of the brand sold mainly in Mexico from 2023. The EW-1 features a maximum power output of 100 Kw and 134 Hp. The maximum torque is 220 NM, and the top speed is 80 kilometers per hour. The battery is a 41.86 Kwh lithium iron phosphate battery capable of a range of 260 kilometers on a full charge.
