= Nissan Lannia =

Chinese compact sedan

Nissan Lannia (U15)
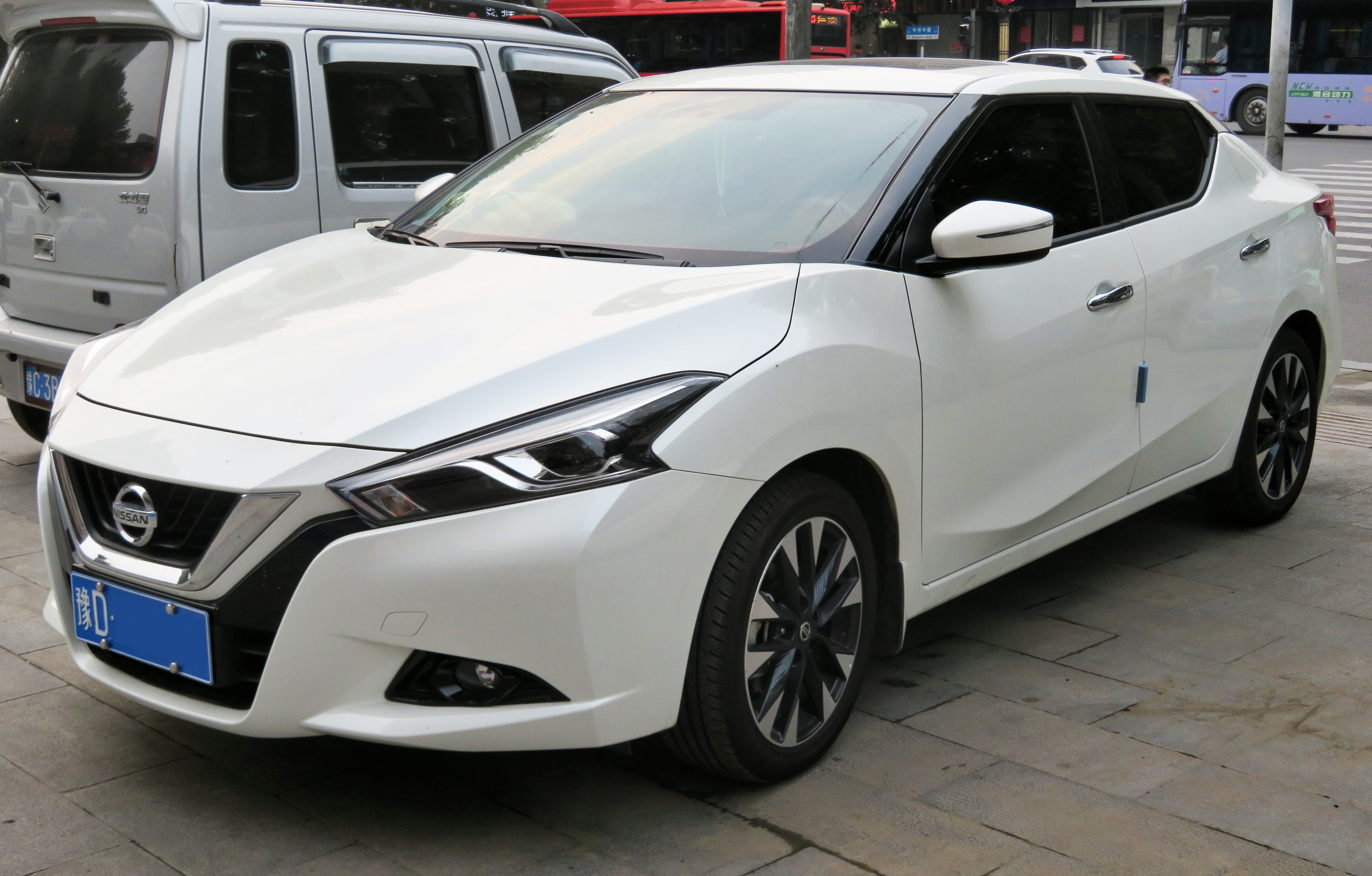

Overview
- Manufacturer: Nissan
- Production: 2015–2022

Body and chassis
- Class: Compact car
- Body style: 4-door sedan
- Layout: Front-engine, front-wheel-drive

Powertrain
- Engine: 1.6 L HR16DE I4
- Transmission: 5-speed manual; Jatco CVT7 W/R X-tronic CVT

Dimensions
- Wheelbase: 2,700 mm (106.3 in)
- Length: 4,683 mm (184.4 in)
- Width: 1,780 mm (70.1 in)
- Height: 1,465 mm (57.7 in)
- Curb weight: 1,195–1,260 kg (2,635–2,778 lb)

The Nissan Lannia (Chinese: 日产蓝鸟; pinyin: Rìchǎn lánniǎo; lit. 'Nissan Bluebird') is a compact sedan produced by the Japanese car company Nissan, which was designed specifically for the Chinese market.

== Concept and design ==
At Auto China 2014 in Beijing, Nissan had presented the first design for a new compact model called "Friend-ME". At the same show, Nissan had presented a concept design called Lannia. At the Auto Shanghai 2015, Nissan showed a production model for the first time, whose design remained very close to the concept design. This show was honored as "Best New Model to Come". Nissan has designed the Lannia to appeal to people between 20 and 30 years old.

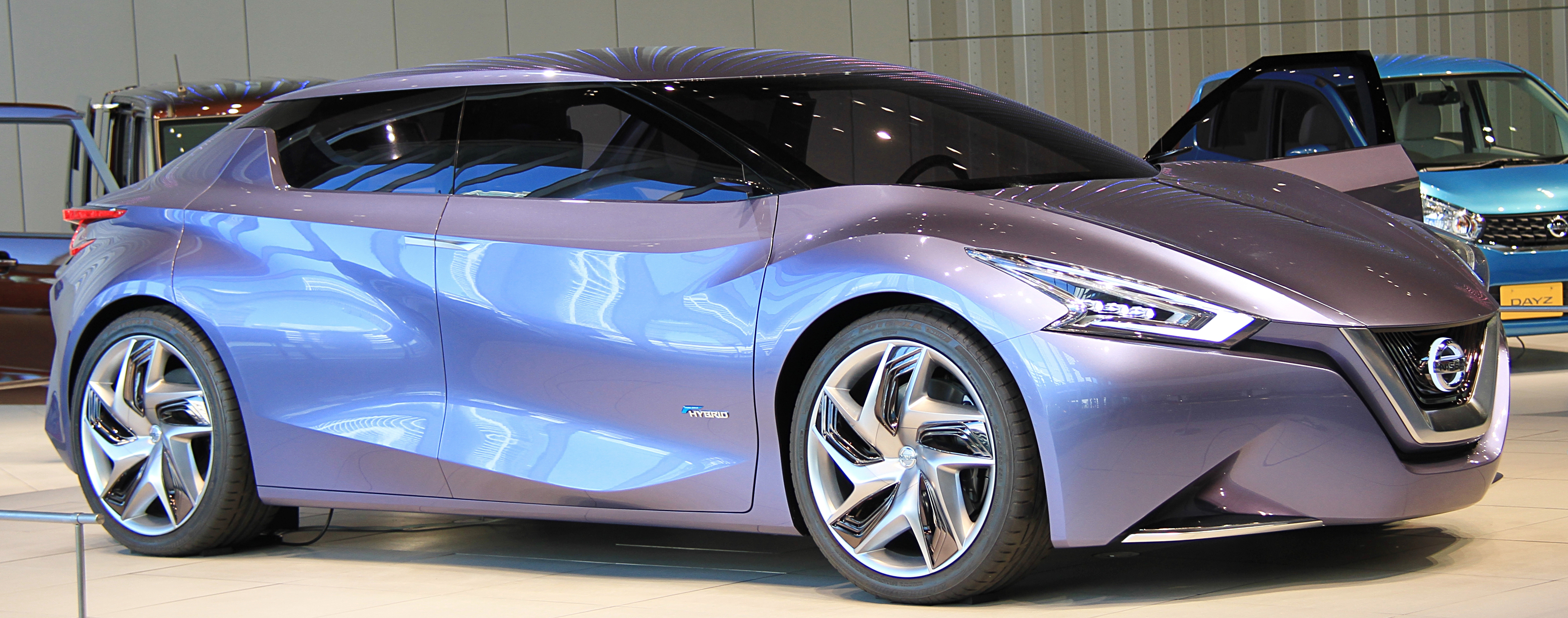
Nissan Friend-ME Concept (front)

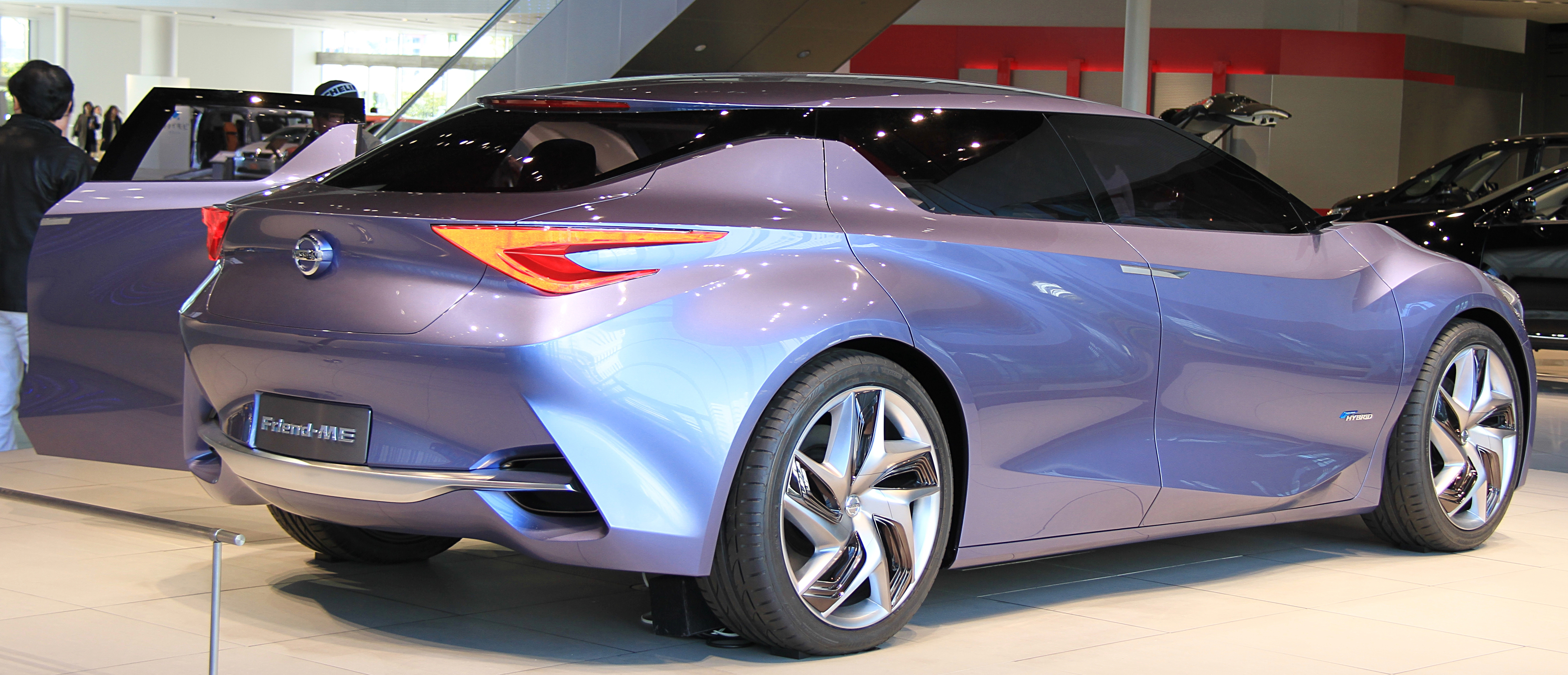
Nissan Friend-ME Concept (rear)

== Production version ==
Unveiled during the 2015 Shanghai Auto Show, the price tag of the production Nissan Lannia starts at CN¥105,900 (approximately US$16,419). The production version of the Nissan Lannia is produced by Dongfeng Motor Co., Ltd. (DFL), Nissan’s joint venture in China. The Nissan Lannia is powered by a 1.6-liter, 127 PS (93 kW) inline-four gasoline engine coupled with an Xtronic CVT Transmission. The Lannia also features high-performance suspension, EPS (Electric Power Steering), and VDC (Vehicle Dynamics Control) systems.

Due to poor sales, the Nissan Lannia was discontinued in China in 2022 without a successor.

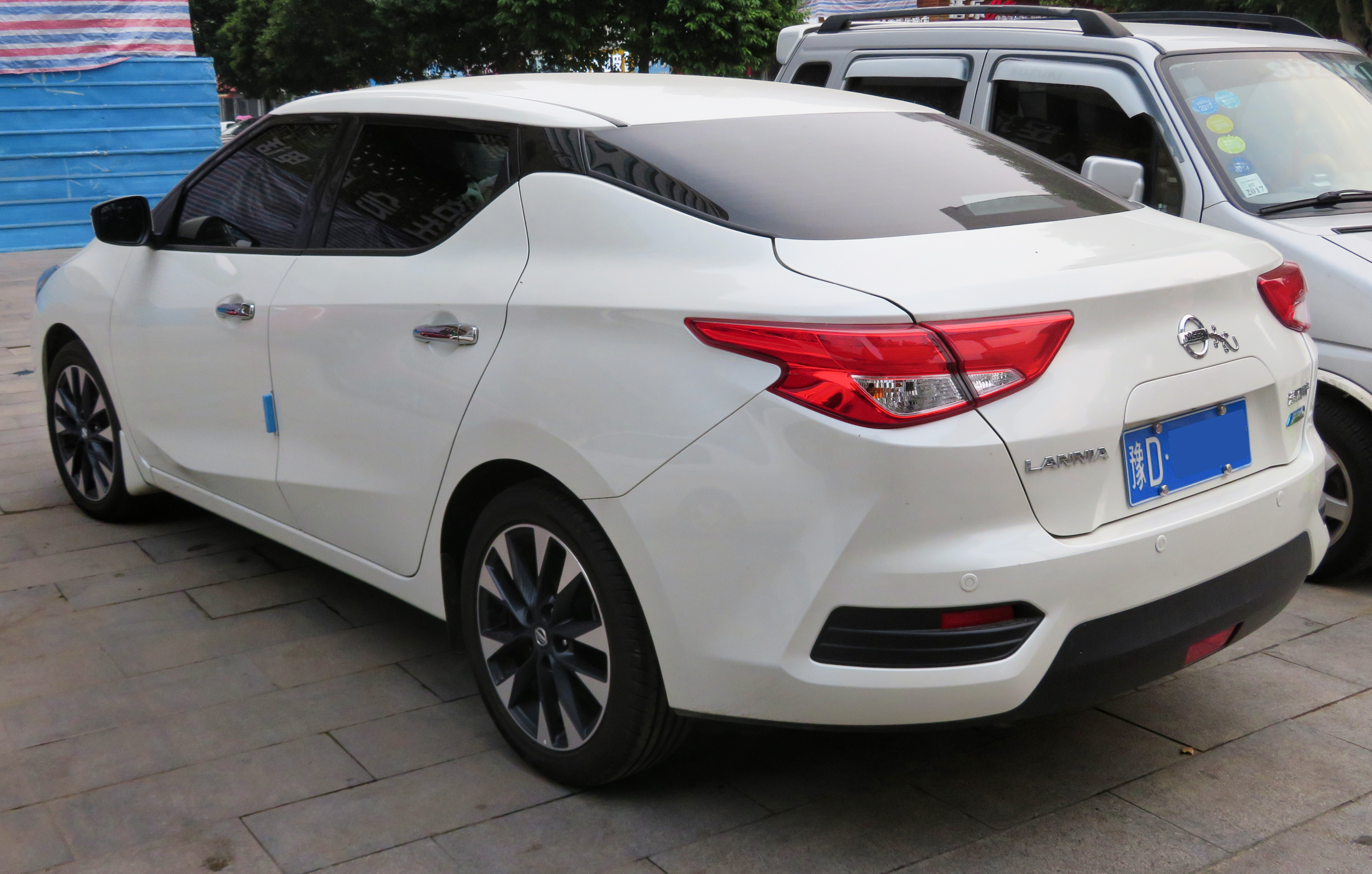
Rear View

== Equipment ==
The Lannia offers a safety package with parking space monitoring, Lane Keeping Assist, and Blind Spot Assist.
