= Wey Gaoshan =

Plug-in hybrid large MPV

Overview
- Manufacturer: Great Wall Motor
- Production: 2023–present

Body and chassis
- Class: Large MPV
- Body style: 5-door minivan

The Wey Gaoshan (Chinese: 魏牌高山; pinyin: Wèipái Gāoshān, tall mountain) is a plug-in hybrid large MPV produced by Great Wall Motor under the premium brand, Wey.

== First generation (2023) ==
First generation
- Wey Gaoshan 7

Overview
- Model code: M81/M83
- Also called: Wey High Mountain; GWM Wey 80 (export, LWB); GWM Wey G9 (Malaysia, Thailand, and Indonesia, SWB) (Note: The Hi4 suffix is added to the name in Thailand. Based on the Gaoshan 8.); Faraday Future FX Super One (United States, LWB)
- Production: 2023–present
- Assembly: China: Tianjin; Malaysia: Alor Gajah, Melaka (EPMB); United States: Hanford, California (FF ieFactory; beginning 2026) (Note: To be assembled in Tianjin and then imported and reassembled at the Hanford factory.)
- Designer: Andrew Dyson

Body and chassis
- Layout: Front-engine, dual-motor, all-wheel-drive

Powertrain
- Engine: Petrol PHEV: 1.5 L E15BD/E15BE turbo I4; 2.0 L GW4N20B turbo I4
- Electric motor: 2× permanent magnet synchronous
- Power output: 442–480 hp (330–358 kW; 448–487 PS)
- Transmission: 4-speed multi-mode DHT
- Hybrid drivetrain: Power-split (PHEV)
- Battery: 37.96–44.28 kWh SVOLT NMC
- Electric range: 140–170 km (87–106 mi)

Dimensions
- Wheelbase: 3,085 mm (121.5 in) (Gaoshan 7); 3,145 mm (123.8 in) (Gaoshan 8); 3,275 mm (128.9 in) (Gaoshan 9)
- Length: 5,045 mm (198.6 in) (Gaoshan 7); 5,280 mm (207.9 in) (Gaoshan 8); 5,405 mm (212.8 in) (Gaoshan 9)
- Width: 1,960 mm (77.2 in)
- Height: 1,890 mm (74.4 in)
- Curb weight: 2,610–2,960 kg (5,754–6,526 lb)

On October 19, 2023, The original Wey Gaoshan went on sale in China. It features a layout that accommodates either six or seven passengers.

During Auto Shanghai 2025, Wey announced the updated Gaoshan family strategy, renaming the short-wheelbase model for family use as the Gaoshan 7, the medium-wheelbase model as the Gaoshan 8, and the long-wheelbase model for business as the Gaoshan 9.

Rear view

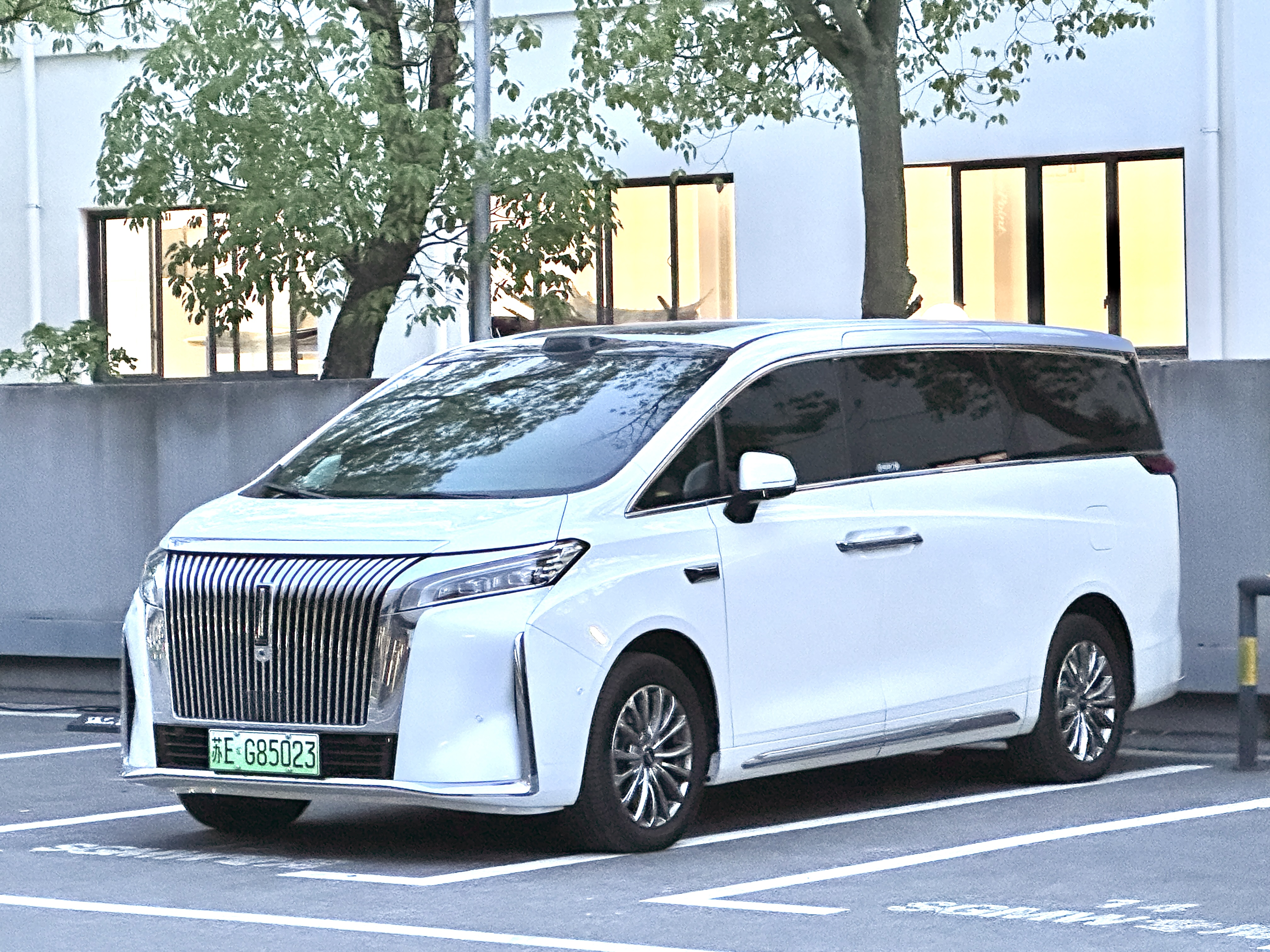
Wey Gaoshan 8

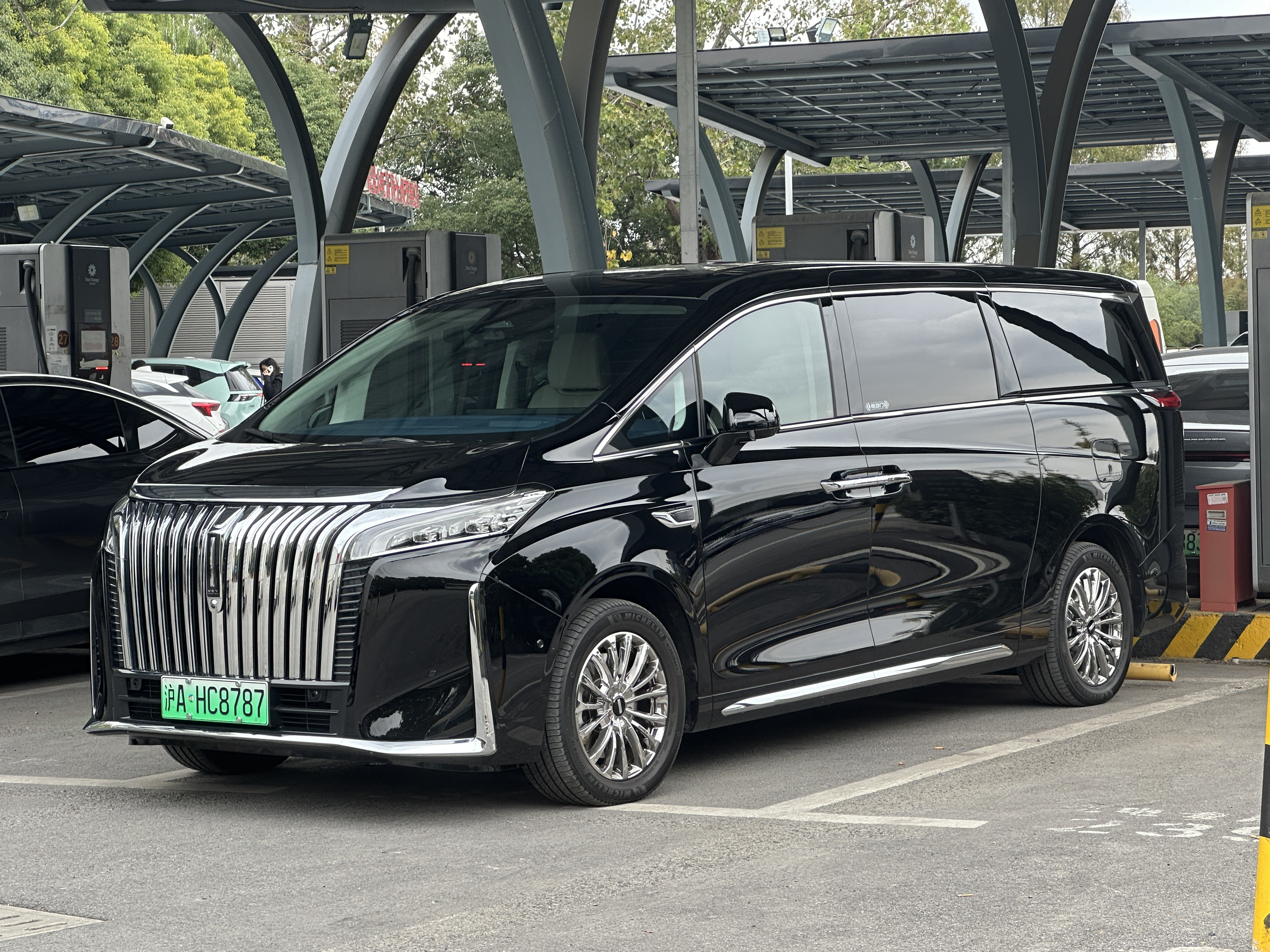
Wey Gaoshan 9

=== Specifications ===
The Gaoshan uses a plug-in hybrid system that consists of a 1.5-liter or 2.0-liter turbocharged inline 4 petrol engine and two electric motors. The 1.5 and 2.0-liter engines produce a maximum power of 154 hp (115 kW; 156 PS) and 235 hp (175 kW; 238 PS), respectively. When combined with the 135 kW (181 hp; 184 PS) rear axle motor, the system delivers a total output of 358 kW (480 hp; 487 PS) and a peak torque of 762 N⋅m (562 lb⋅ft), or 337 kW (452 hp; 458 PS) and 644 N⋅m (475 lb⋅ft) of torque for the long wheelbase version. It accelerates from 0 to 100 km/h (62 mph) in 5.7 seconds. The Gaoshan features electric four-wheel drive. A SVOLT-made NMC battery pack with a capacity of 37.96 kWh (44.28 kWh for the long wheelbase version) enables a range of 175 km (109 mi) in electric mode according to the CLTC standard.

=== Wey Gaoshan SUV ===
In November 2026, GWM announced SUV version of the Gaoshan MPV. The SUV version has new suspension components to reduce wobble, with 30mm higher ground clearance. Front and rear aero, to avoid big head small feet look. The SUV version is the same price as the regular version in China.

=== Markets ===
==== China ====
The Gaoshan first went on sale in China on October 18, 2023. On May 14, 2025, a medium-wheelbase model, named the Gaoshan 8 went on sale, and the long-wheelbase was renamed to the Gaoshan 9. A short-wheelbase model named the Gaoshan 7, launched in China on October 16, 2025.

==== Indonesia ====
THe Gaoshan 7 was launched on September 11, 2026 as the GWM Wey G9 Hi4. It is available in Hybrid and Plug-in Hybrid variant.

==== Malaysia ====
The Gaoshan 7 is marketed as the GWM Wey G9 in Malaysia and was launched on January 29, 2026. It is available in a sole variant that costs RM269,800. Compared to the Chinese market's Gaoshan 7, the engine in the Malaysian market G9 is less powerful.

==== Thailand ====
The Gaoshan 7 went on sale as the GWM Wey G9 Hi4 in Thailand on November 24, 2025. It is available in a sole variant and use the 44.82 kWh battery pack, with an all-electric range of 170 km (106 miles).

=== United Arab Emirates ===
In April 2024, Wey Gaoshan went on sale in the United Arab Emirates as the GWM Wey 80 (Gaoshan 9), marking the first-batch deliveries of the vehicle in the Middle East market.

==== United States ====
On July 17, 2025, Faraday Future announced that their Super One minivan, the first model under their Faraday X sub-brand, would be a rebadged Gaoshan 9 that would be imported first from the Tianjin plant and then reassembled at their plant in Hanford, California, planning to use 50 percent locally sourced parts and its internally developed AI software and tech stack.

The Super One was confirmed at the 2025 Consumer Electronics Show by the Faraday X subbrand's CEO, Max Ma.

=== Sales ===
Year	China
2023	1,788
2024	6,220
2025	61,594

== Second generation (2026) ==
Second generation
- Wey Gaoshan 8 II

Overview
- Production: 2026–present
- Assembly: China: Tianjin

Body and chassis
- Layout: Front-engine, dual-motor, all-wheel-drive

Powertrain
- Engine: Petrol PHEV: 1.5 L E15BD/E15BE turbo I4; 2.0 L GW4N20B turbo I4
- Electric motor: 2× permanent magnet synchronous
- Power output: 442–480 hp (330–358 kW; 448–487 PS)
- Transmission: 4-speed multi-mode DHT
- Hybrid drivetrain: Power-split (PHEV)
- Battery: 37.96–44.28 kWh SVOLT NMC
- Electric range: 140–170 km (87–106 mi)

Dimensions
- Wheelbase: 3,145 mm (123.8 in) (Gaoshan 8); 3,275 mm (128.9 in) (Gaoshan 9)
- Length: 5,280 mm (207.9 in) (Gaoshan 8); 5,410 mm (213.0 in) (Gaoshan 9)
- Width: 1,960 mm (77.2 in)
- Height: 1,900 mm (74.8 in) (Gaoshan 8); 1,890 mm (74.4 in) (Gaoshan 9)

The second generation Wey Gaoshan was launched in September 2026 for the 2027 model year and is available in Gaoshan 8 and Gaoshan 9 variants with similar dimensions with the first generation models. The new models are dubbed the Gaoshan Smart Edition, and would be sold alongside the first generation models as more premium options.

The Gaoshan 8 HEV comes with a 7-seat setup while the larger Gaoshan 9 PHEV comes with a 6-seat setup. The Gaoshan 8 HEV version would be delivered in the fourth quarter of the same year. The HEV variant is equipped with a 2.0T hybrid-specific engine and GWM's Hi4 four-wheel drive system, and it is also equipped with a 3.64kWh battery.

Rear view

Interior
