= Arcfox Beta T1 =

Battery electric compact hatchback

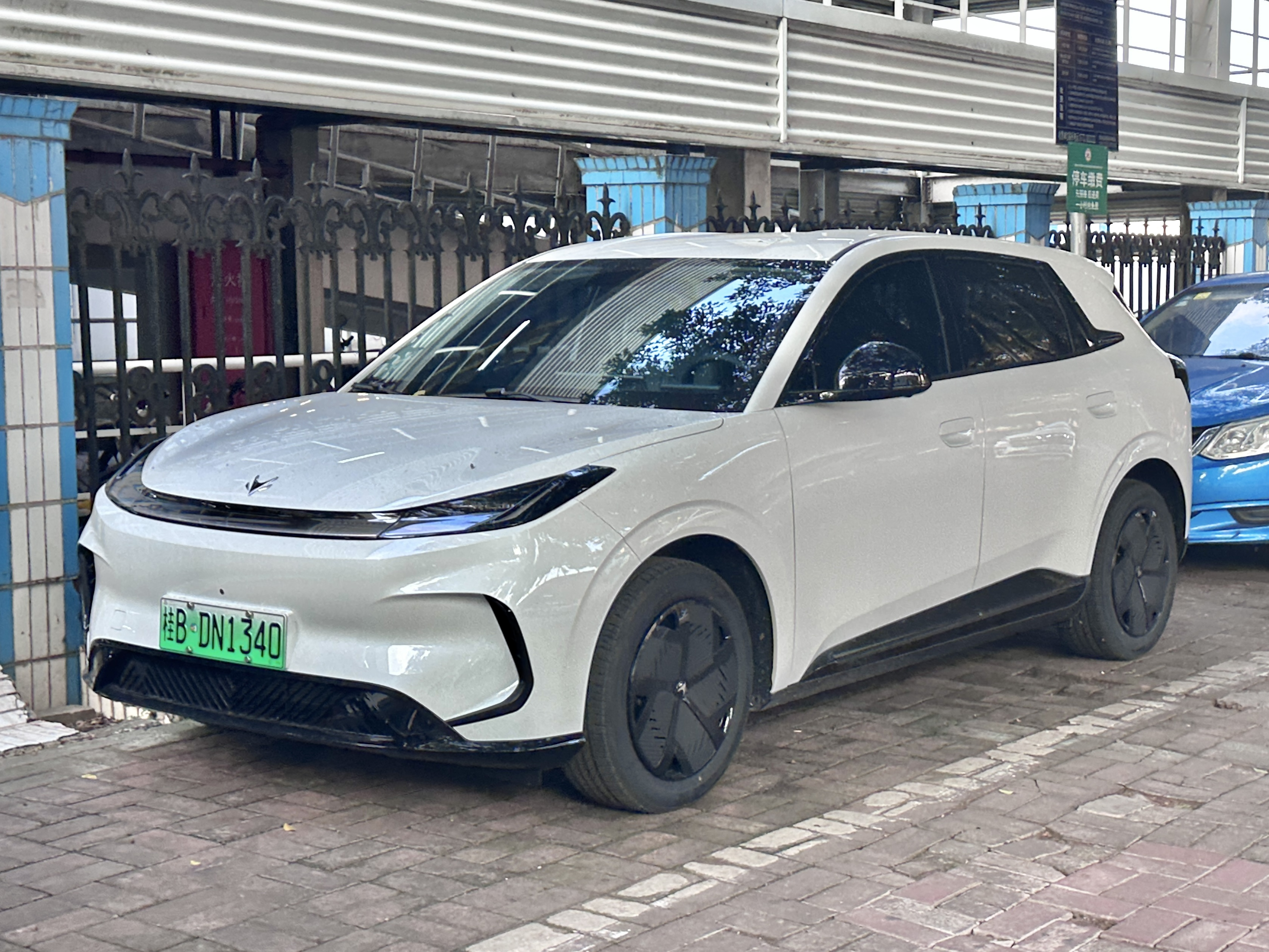

Overview
- Manufacturer: Arcfox (BAIC Group)
- Also called: Arcfox T1 (2025–2026); BAIC T1 (Indonesia); BAIC X3e (Sri Lanka)
- Production: August 2025 – present
- Assembly: China: Zhenjiang; Indonesia: Purwakarta

Body and chassis
- Class: Compact car (C)
- Body style: 5-door hatchback
- Layout: Front-motor, front-wheel drive

Powertrain
- Electric motor: Permanent magnet synchronous
- Power output: 94–127 hp (70–95 kW; 95–129 PS)
- Transmission: 1-speed direct-drive reduction
- Battery: 33.4 kWh LFP GAC Yinpai; 42.3 kWh LFP CALB
- Electric range: 320–425 km (199–264 mi) (CLTC)

Dimensions
- Wheelbase: 2,770 mm (109.1 in)
- Length: 4,337 mm (170.7 in)
- Width: 1,860 mm (73.2 in)
- Height: 1,572 mm (61.9 in)
- Curb weight: 1,415–1,420 kg (3,120–3,131 lb)

The Arcfox Beta T1 (Chinese: 极狐贝塔T1) is a battery electric compact hatchback manufactured by BAIC under the Arcfox brand. Initially sold as the Arcfox T1 in 2025, the facelift for the 2026 model year includes a name update to the Arcfox Beta T1.

== Overview ==
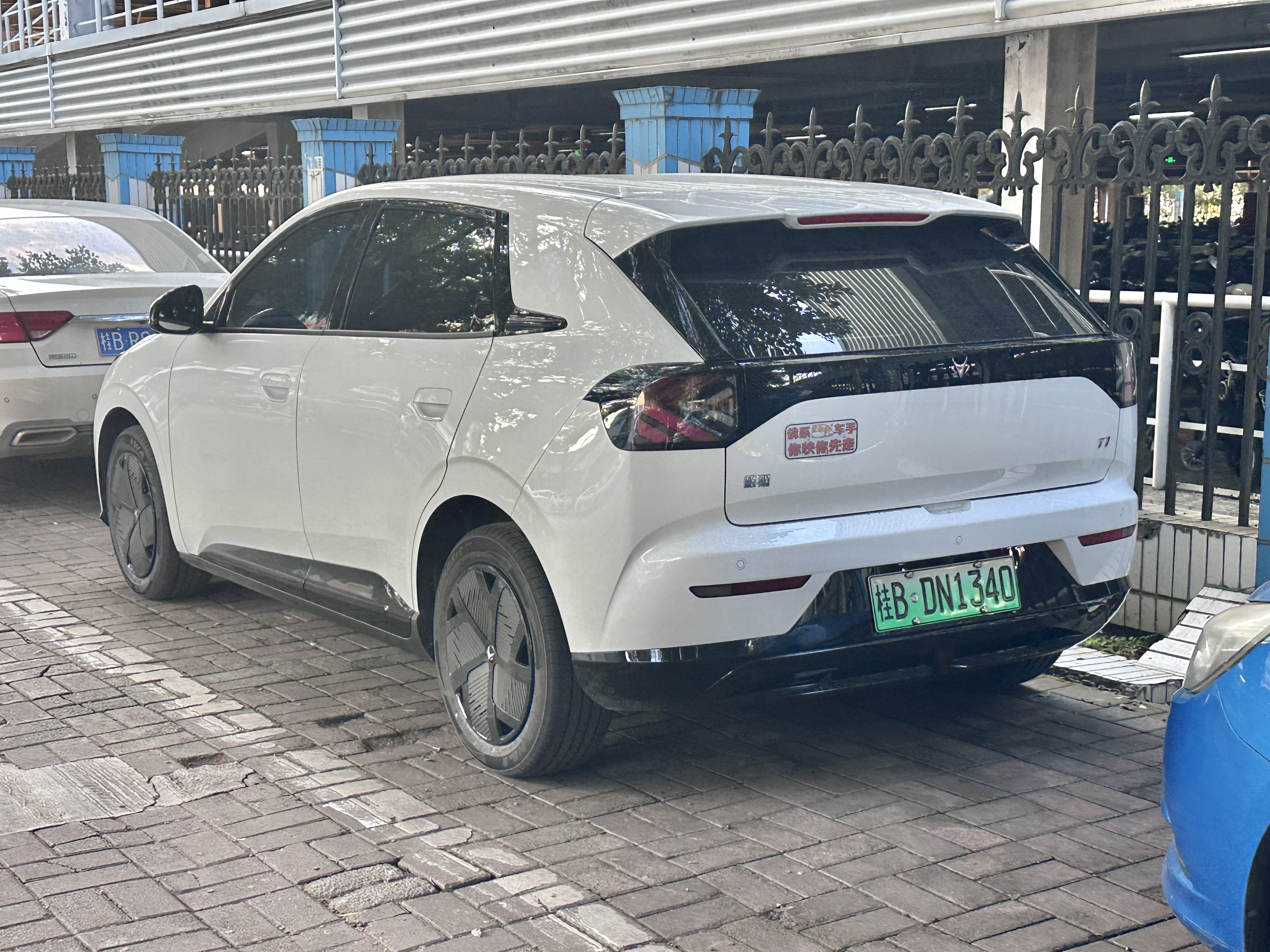
Rear view

In June 2025, Arcfox presented its first new model in a year, intended as a response to the popular electric compact hatchback and domestic competitors led by BYD Dolphin and Geely Xingyuan. The car gained shapely proportions dictated by the practicality of the luggage space, and the exterior gained lighting connected by light strips at both the front and rear. The appearance was further enhanced by a two-tone paint job with a black roof.

The passenger compartment maintains the design typical of Chinese products from the mid-2020s, featuring a large 2.34-square-meter sunroof and the ability to fold both the rear and front seats flat. In front of the driver is an 8.8-inch digital instrument panel, while the center of the dashboard is adorned with another 15.6-inch touchscreen.

=== 2026 (facelift) ===
The T1 received an update for the 2026 model year featuring a restyled rear end and a name change to the Beta T1 making it now part of the Beta series product line of the Arcfox brand. The updated model also supports updated intelligent parking assistance and Level 2 advanced driver-assistance systems (ADAS).

Arcfox Beta T1 2026 (facelift)

Rear view

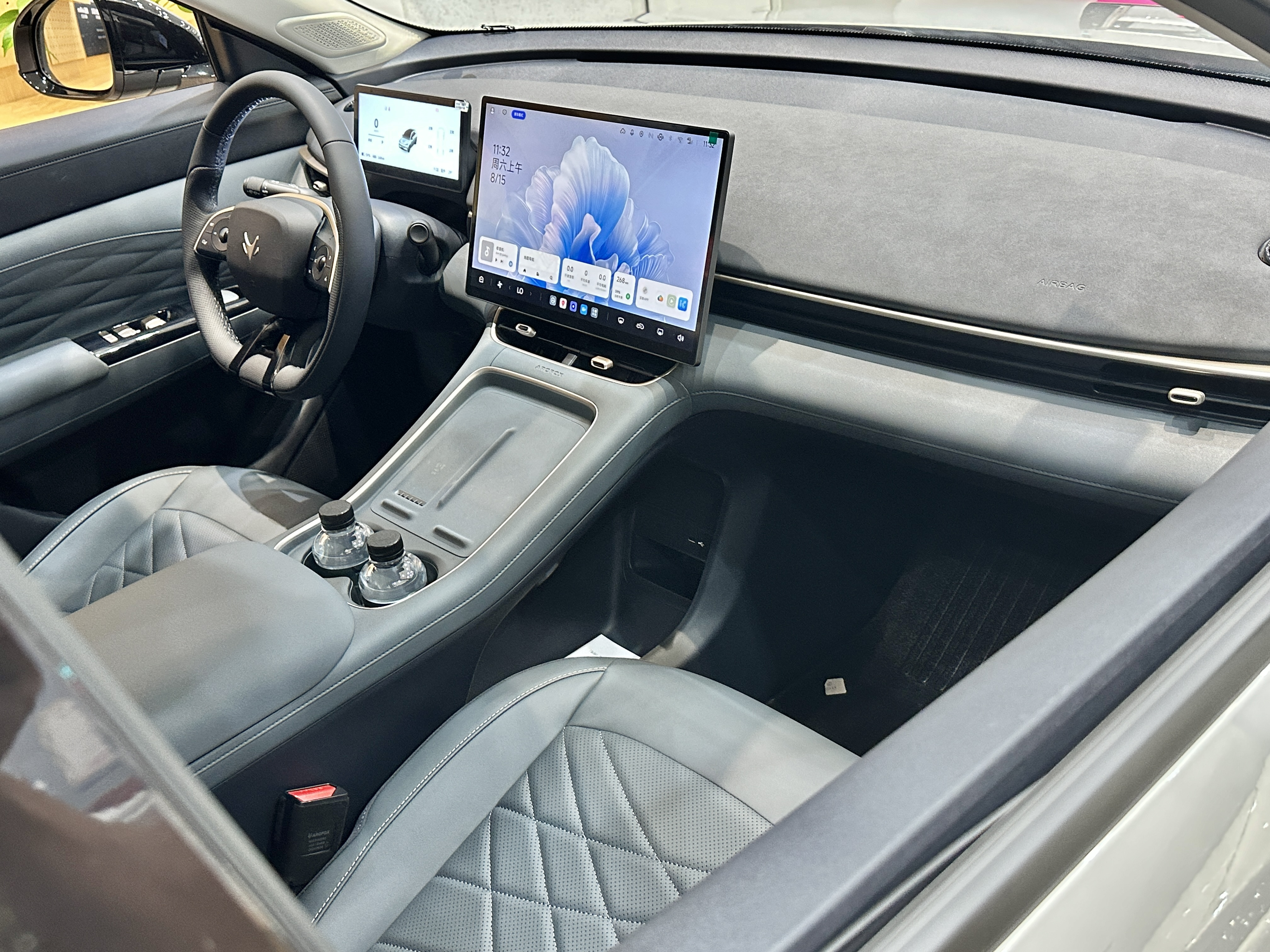
Interior

== Specifications ==
The T1 is equipped with an electric drive system in two versions: 70 kW (94 hp) or 94 kW (126 hp). The less powerful version is paired with a 42.3 kWh battery, offering approximately 425 kilometres (264 mi) of range according to the CLTC standard, while the higher powered version offers up to 320 kilometres (199 mi) of range with its smaller battery. All variants are capable of charging from 30–80% in 17 minutes.

== Markets ==
=== Indonesia ===
The vehicle is marketed as the BAIC T1 and was launched in Indonesia on 30 July 2026 at the 33rd Gaikindo Indonesia International Auto Show, as the first battery electric vehicle from the BAIC Group to be marketed in Indonesia. Locally assembled in Indonesia, it is available in the sole unnamed variant using the 42.3 kWh battery pack.

=== South Africa ===
The vehicle is marketed as the Arcfox T1 and was launched in South Africa on 22 October 2026. It is available with two variants: Pro and Max, both variants using the 42.3 kWh battery pack.

== Sales ==
Year	China
2025	43,500
