= Lorinser =

German car tuning company for Mercedes-Benz

Sportservice Lorinser GmbH
- Type: Private
- Industry: Automotive
- Founded: March 1, 1930
- Headquarters: Winnenden, Germany (Sportservice) Suzhou, China (Lorinser China)
- Area served: Worldwide (Sportservice) China (Lorinser China)
- Key people: Marcus Lorinser, Head of Sportservice department Maxwell Lu, Foreperson Yuyou Gao, Head of Lorinser China
- Products: Engine tuning (Sportservice) Bespoke Vehicle Design (Lorinser China)
- Website: www.lorinser.com www.lorinserauto.com.cn

Sportservice Lorinser GmbH, founded 1930 in Winnenden, Germany, is a specialist tuning company for Mercedes-Benz.

== History ==
In 1935, Lorinser became Daimler AG's official reseller and takes over the maintenance and service responsibility for the Mercedes brand.

Erwin Lorinser, the founder, started to involve his son, Manfred, in the business during 1974 by appointing him as the Managing Director.

In 1976, Lorinser started tuning for Mercedes-Benz. In the same year, Lorinser's new car dealership was established in Winnenden.

By 1981, "Sportservice Lorinser GmbH" was enlisted in the Commercial Register.

As early as 1995, Lorinser has entered the Chinese market, which was the first of many Mercedes-Benz custom brands to enter the country. It was advertised and sold under the name "Luolunshi", a phonetic transcription of the name in Mandarin Chinese. However, it is limited by factors such as the market, the economy, and consumers' perception of customised cars. Due to this, Lorinser was not widely known. The road to development in China was difficult. Eventually, Lorinser pulled out of the Chinese market.

With the arrival of the 21st century, Lorinser also welcomed its third general manager, Marcus Lorinser, in 2006. At the same time, with the vigorous development of China's economy, the high-end custom car market has gradually emerged, and the demand of domestic consumers for custom cars has gradually increased. Marcus Lorinser visited China multiple times to understand the market and was determined to bring the Lorinser brand back to China.

In 2016, Lorinser launched its first MPV, the MS500, exclusively in China. In 2020, Lorinser launched their new China-exclusive “SKY series” luxury MPVs based on the Mercedes-Benz V-Class. Dubbing “a new era for MPVs”. These vehicles achieved great success in China.

In 2024, the Lorinser Automotive Customisation Industrial Park (LACIP), a fully-digitalised production estate, opened in Suzhou, China. This is a joint venture between Lorinser and Waller Auto, a Chinese pick-up truck camper conversion company based in Tianjin. This also led to the establishment of Lorinser China, constituting to a “Greater Lorinser Marque”, with the previous Waller CEO, Yuyou Gao, overseeing production. Lorinser China operates independently from the Sportservice department in Germany.

In January 2025, a private investor acquired the struggling Waller brand and its equity, including the majority in Lorinser China. Two months after, the same person acquired the remaining shares in Lorinser China. Yuyou Gao has been appointed acting CEO and Head of Lorinser China. In April, Lorinser China announced its “T-Rex” sub-brand, continuing the legacy of Waller, producing customised pick-up truck campers in the LACIP.

By June 2025, the same private investor, now revealed to be Maxwell Lu, acquired the rest of the Lorinser marque, including the Sportservice department in Germany. However, he has stated that Sportservice Lorinser will continue to operate as its own entity, independent from Lorinser China. In the same month, retail stores of Lorinser popped up all over major cities of China.

== Products ==
- Engine Tuning
- Automotive Performance Products
- Exterior Styling
- Camper Truck Conversions (China-only)
- Bespoke Vehicle Designs (China-only)

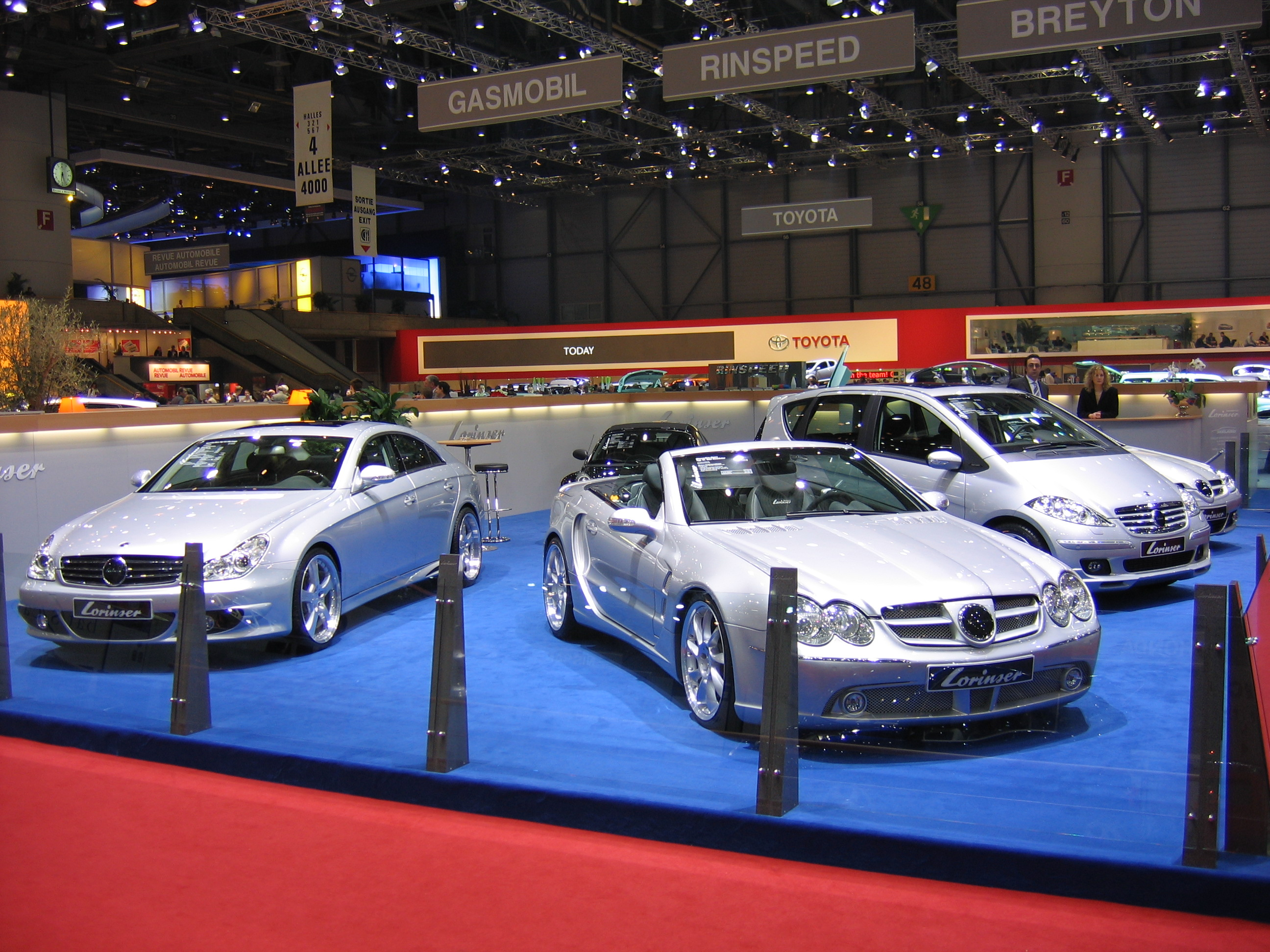
Lorinser vehicles at the Geneva Motor Show 2005.

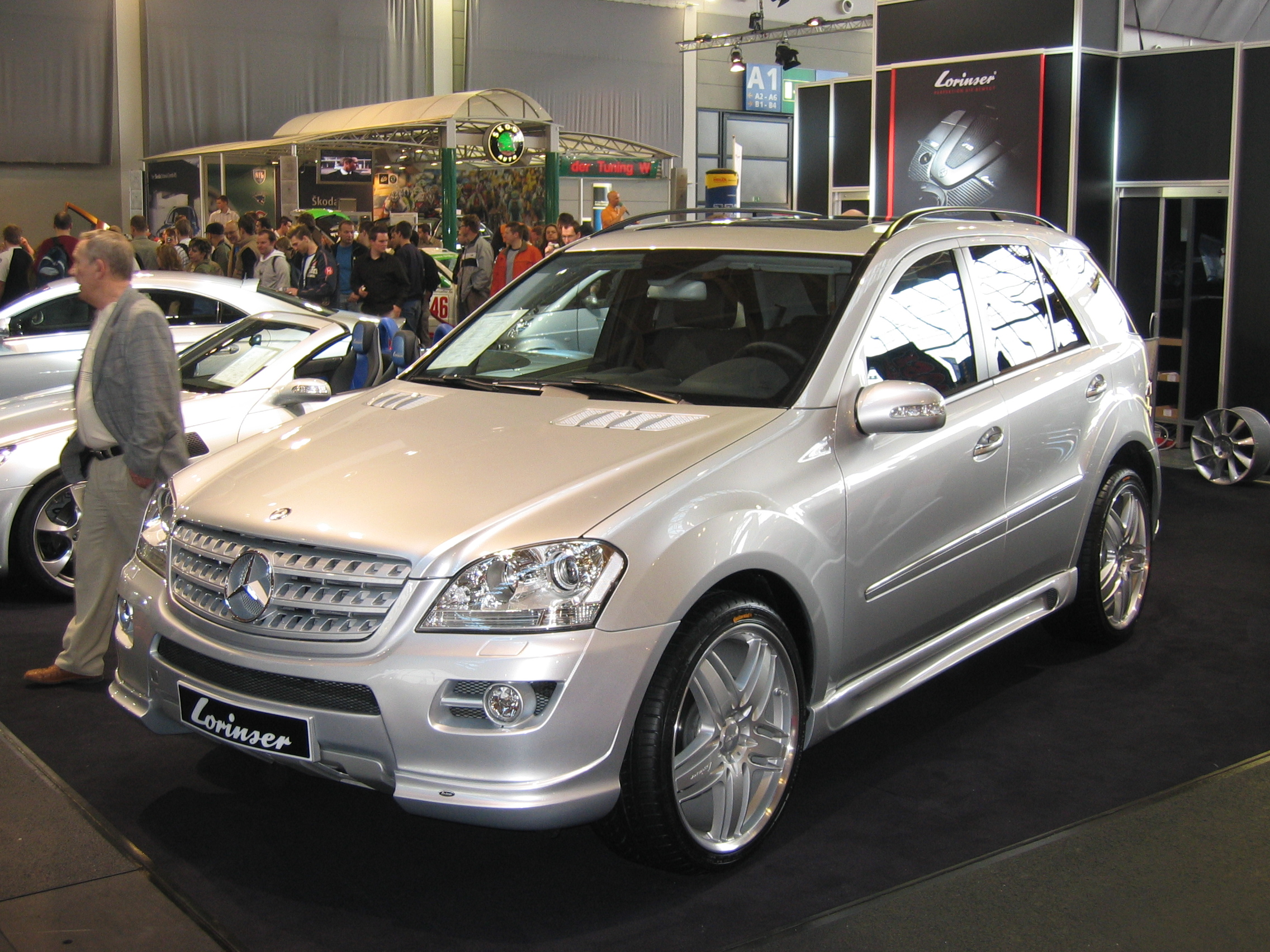

== Records ==
In 1996, Lorinser has been awarded with the certification according to the quality management norm DIN EN ISO 9002.
