= Modern IN =

Battery electric compact hatchback

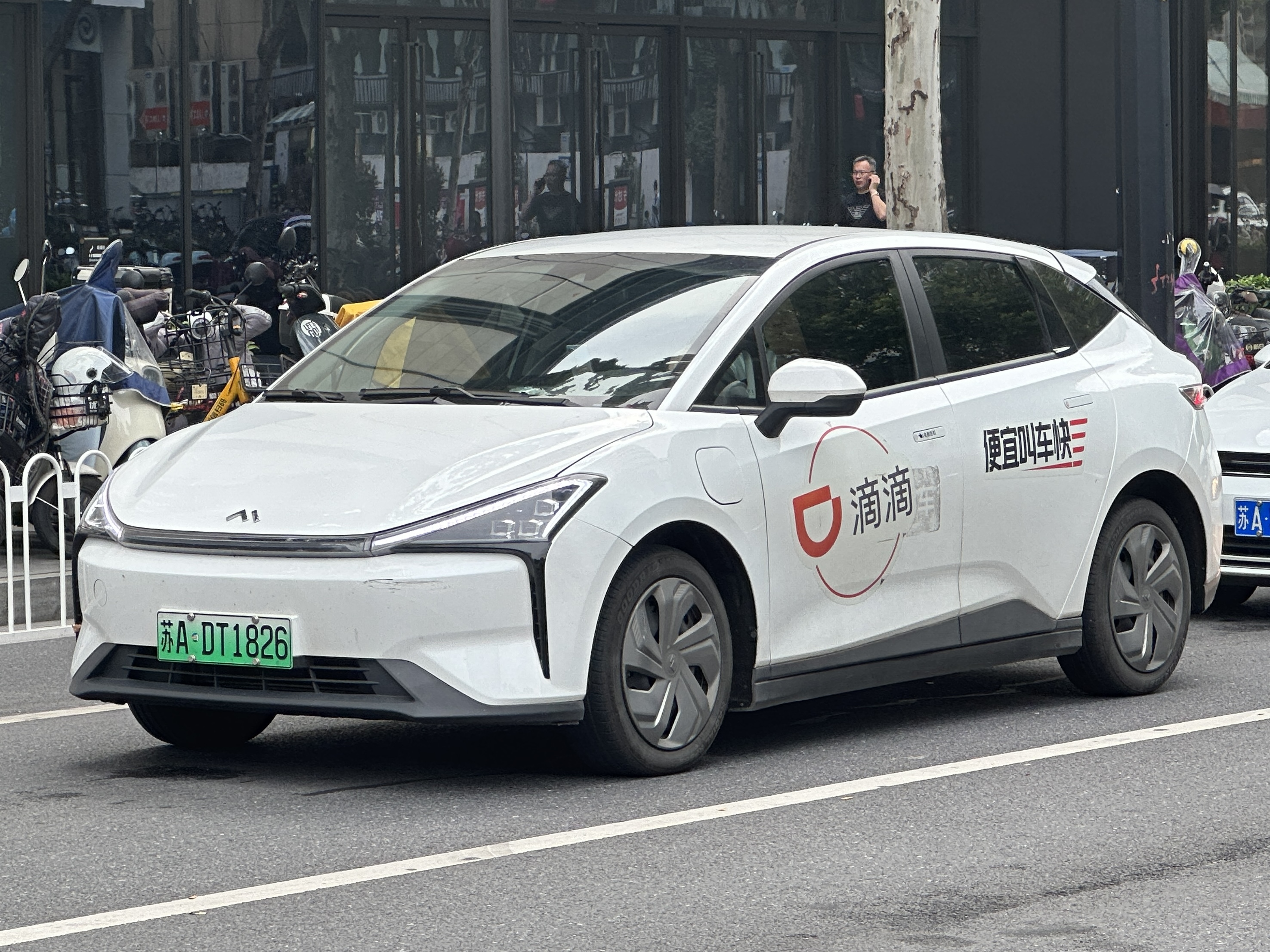

Overview
- Manufacturer: Modern Auto
- Also called: Modern A (pre-production); ARRA 3 (Mexico)
- Production: 2021–present
- Assembly: China: Yancheng and Qingdao

Body and chassis
- Class: Compact car (C)
- Body style: 5-door hatchback
- Layout: Front-motor, front-wheel drive

Powertrain
- Electric motor: Permanent magnet synchronous motor, 160 horsepower (120 kW)
- Battery: 53 or 80 KWh lithium-ion
- Range: 400 km (250 mi) or 610 km (380 mi) NEDC

Dimensions
- Wheelbase: 2,700 mm (106.3 in)
- Length: 4,463 mm (175.7 in)
- Width: 1,823 mm (71.8 in)
- Height: 1,551 mm (61.1 in)
- Curb weight: 1,535–1,680 kg (3,384–3,704 lb)

The Modern IN is a battery electric compact hatchback manufactured by Modern Auto from 2021.

== Overview ==
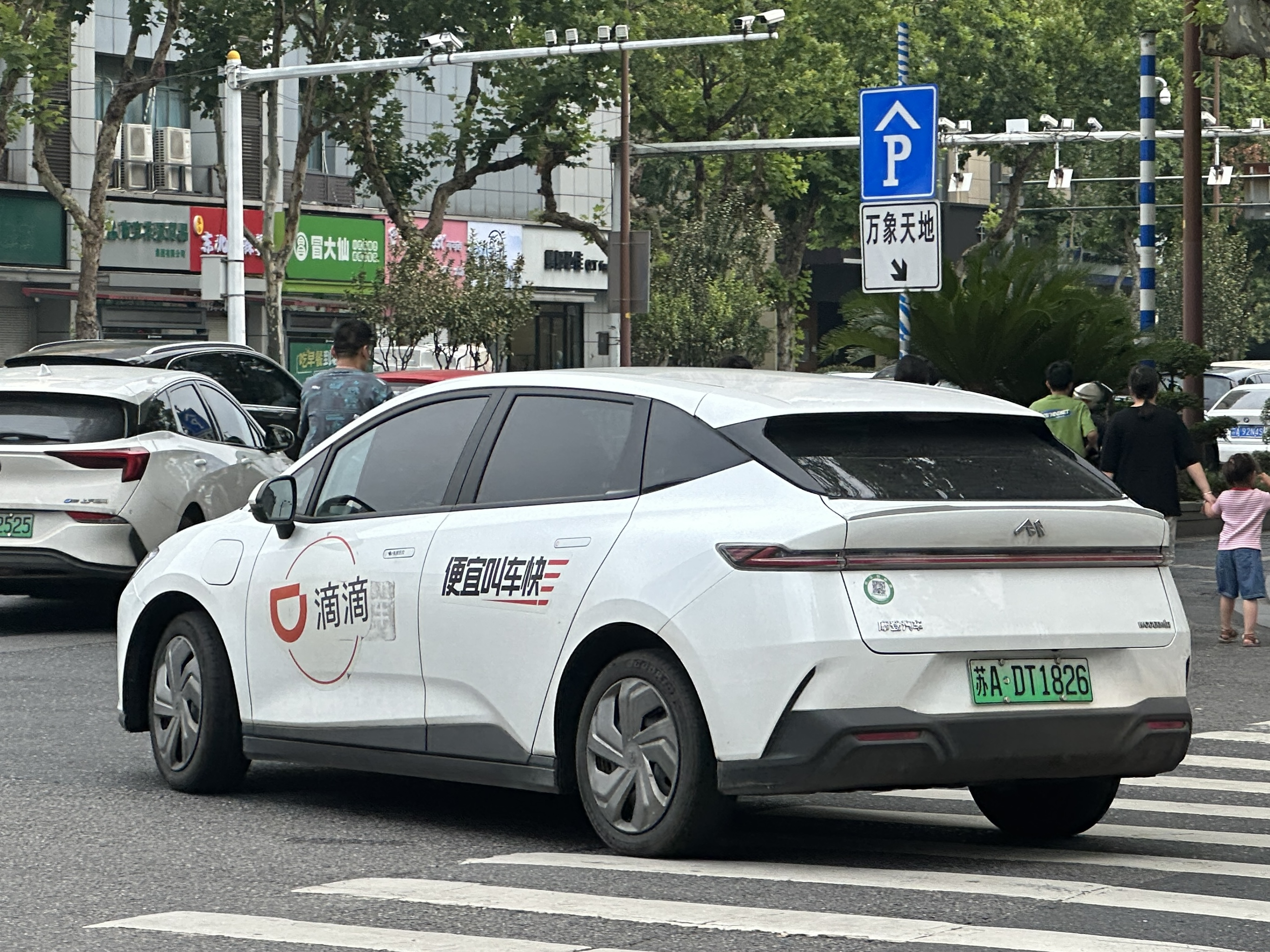
Rear view

The Modern Auto was established in Shanghai in 2018. The IN is the first production vehicle of the firm, and was first previewed as the Modern A in October 2020. In 2023, Modern Auto started to export its cars to Mexico, Hungary, Dominica and some Middle Eastern countries.

== Specifications ==
The IN is a compact car offered with two variants of battery. A 53kWh battery with an NEDC range of 400 km and a 80kWh battery with an NEDC range of 610 km. Charging from 30% to 80% takes 30 minutes on a fast charger. The power of the Modern IN comes from a 160 hp and 280 Nm electric motor. 0 to 100 km/h acceleration could be done in 7.9 seconds. The Modern IN has L2 autonomous driving capabilities and can receive OTA software updates.
