= Dongfeng Z9 =

Pickup truck produced by Zhengzhou Nissan

Dongfeng Z9; Nissan Frontier/Navara Pro; Santana 400
- DFM Rich 9

Overview
- Manufacturer: Zhengzhou Nissan; Santana Motor
- Model code: P20
- Also called: DFSK Z9 (Chile); Dongfeng Z9 GE (China, PHEV); GTV Kouprey ZNA (Cambodia); Nissan Navara Pro (Frontier Pro, Middle East and the Philippines); Zhengzhou Nissan Z9 GT (China); Zhengzhou Nissan Z9 GTS (China); ZNA Z9 GT (Philippines and Bolivia)
- Production: January 2025 – present; October 2025 – present (Santana 400)
- Assembly: China: Zhengzhou, Henan (Zhengzhou Nissan); Spain: Linares, Jaén (Santana Motors; Santana 400)
- Designer: Li Lin (Frontier Pro)

Body and chassis
- Class: Mid-size pickup truck
- Body style: 4-door pickup truck
- Layout: Front-engine, rear-wheel-drive or four-wheel-drive
- Platform: α·Star

Powertrain
- Engine: Gasoline: 2.0 L 4K31TD turbo I4; Gasoline plug-in hybrid: 1.5 L DFMC15TE3 turbo I4; Diesel: 2.3 L M9T-500 turbo I4
- Power output: 143 hp (107 kW; 145 PS) (Z9 diesel, low output); 190 hp (142 kW; 193 PS) (Z9, diesel); 258 hp (192 kW; 262 PS) (Z9, gasoline); 322 hp (240 kW; 326 PS) (Z9 GE, RWD); 410 hp (306 kW; 416 PS) (Frontier Pro PHEV); 429 hp (320 kW; 435 PS) (Z9 GE, 4WD)
- Transmission: 4-speed DHT (PHEV); 6-speed manual; 8-speed ZF 8HP torque converter automatic
- Hybrid drivetrain: Plug-in hybrid
- Battery: 17 kWh (RWD) or 32.85 kWh (4WD) NMC
- Electric range: 60–135 km (37–84 mi)

Dimensions
- Wheelbase: 3,299 mm (129.9 in)
- Length: 5,519 mm (217.3 in)
- Width: 1,961 mm (77.2 in)
- Height: 1,951 mm (76.8 in)

Chronology
- Predecessor: Nissan Navara (D23)

The Dongfeng Z9 (Chinese: 东风Z9; pinyin: Dōngfēng Z9), the Nissan Frontier Pro (Chinese: 日产锋坦; pinyin: Rìchǎn Fēngtǎn), and the Santana 400 are mid-size pickup trucks produced by Zhengzhou Nissan, a joint venture of Dongfeng Motor Corporation and Nissan Motor Co., Ltd., and Santana Motor respectively.

== Overview ==
The Z9 is a 4-door pickup truck bigger than the North American Nissan Frontier. English sources used the Nissan Yuanye Z9 (Chinese: 日产元野Z9; pinyin: Rìchǎn Yuányě Z9) name before production started. It was officially unveiled on December 16, 2024, with the model initially being sold with gasoline or diesel powertrains. The Zhengzhou Nissan Z9 GT, a variant of the Z9, comes standard with four-wheel-drive. A version of the Z9 called the Z9 GTS will also be offered and is expected to target off-road enthusiasts.

Production of the Z9 commenced in January 2025.

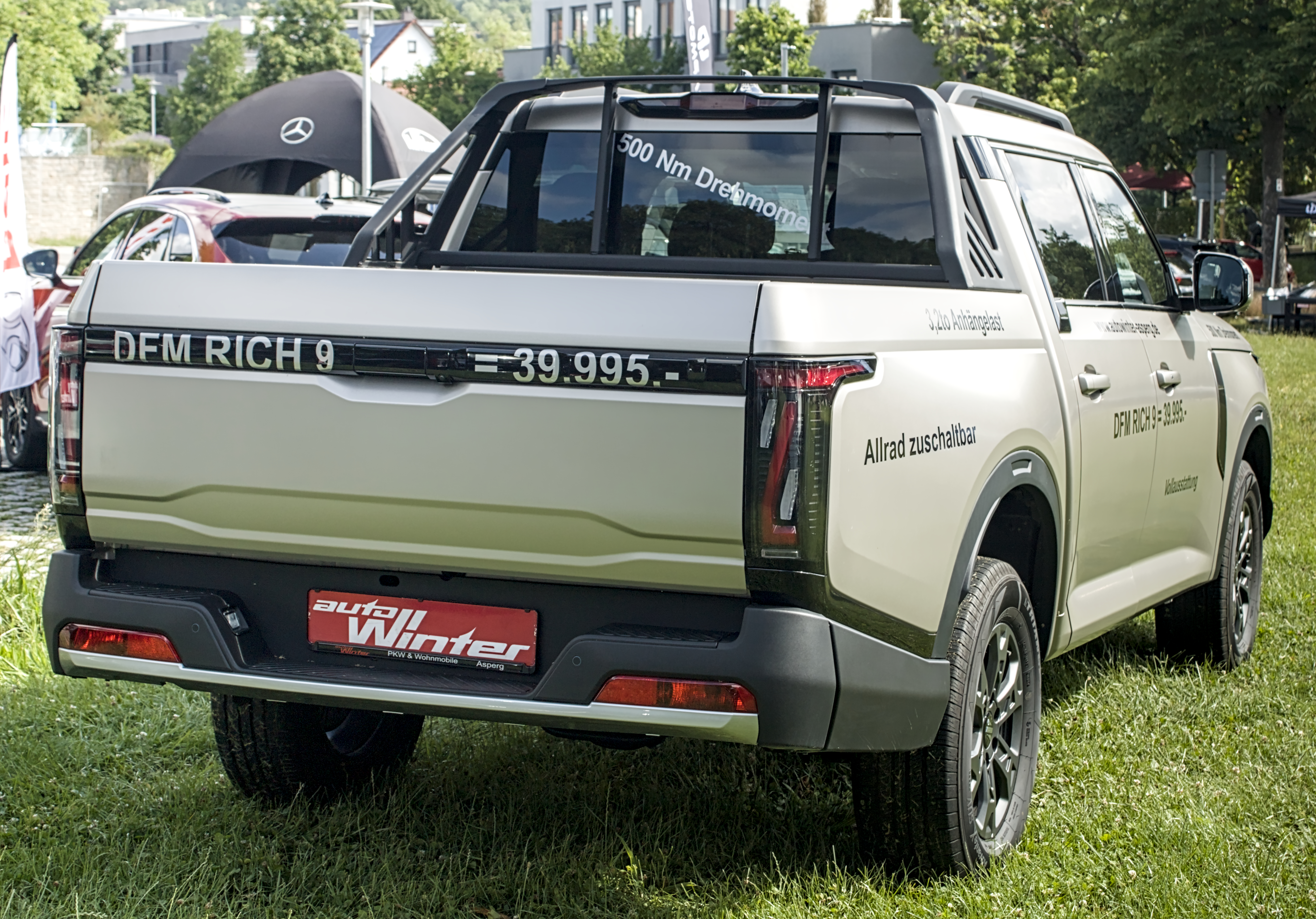
Rear view

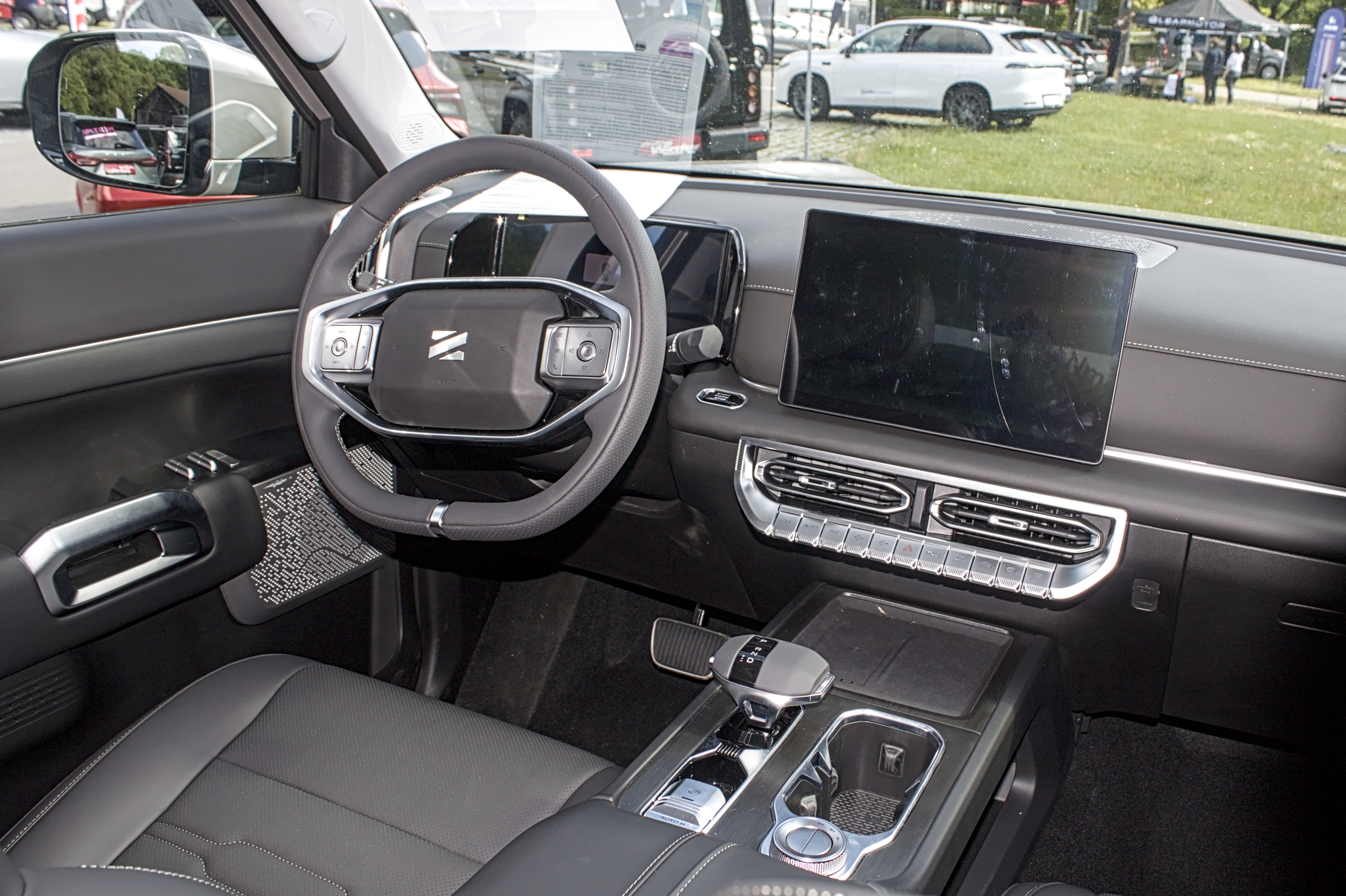
Interior

=== Design ===
The Z9 uses blacked out A, B, and C-pillars. There are Z-shaped daytime running lights in the front and the taillights are also Z-shaped. Body cladding is present in the front and rear. There are rounded wheel arches and the model also features a grille with a hexagonal pattern.

==== Frontier Pro ====
The Nissan Frontier Pro differentiates in the design from the Z9 as it uses a full-width light bar with the light bar inspired by the D21 Hardbody. The Nissan wordmark is embedded into the tailgate and serves as a taillight.

=== Features ===
All models receive 18-inch rims and 265/65R18 tires as standard.

Faux leather is used as the seating material in the interior. All models can be had with a height-adjustable multifunction steering wheel wrapped in synthetic leather. Regardless of trim, a 10.25-inch digital cluster is standard. A digital display is used on lower trims while a virtual digital cluster with an LCD display is used on higher trims. A 12-inch touchscreen is used on lower trims, with higher trims receiving a slightly larger 12.8-inch screen.

== Nissan Frontier Pro/Navara Pro ==
The Nissan Frontier Pro is the Nissan version of the Z9. It was revealed at the 2025 Shanghai Auto Show, initially as a plug-in hybrid. It was showcased alongside the N7. In May 2025 a Nissan engineer confirmed to Australia's Drive that an SUV version of the Frontier Pro is being considered.

An ICE version of the Frontier Pro was unveiled during Dongfeng Nissan's 40th anniversary event on October 16, 2025. Only the diesel version was showcased at the event and is available with the M9T diesel engine and the 8-speed automatic transmission.

Pre-sales of the Frontier Pro began on October 30, 2025. At the start of pre-sales a gasoline version was also announced, and the plug-in hybrid version's power output was increased to 410 horsepower compared to 402 horsepower when the Frontier Pro was first announced. The Frontier Pro comes standard with four-wheel-drive.

The Frontier Pro went on sale on November 27, 2025.

In April 2026, Nissan confirmed that the Frontier Pro will be exported to the Middle East as the Navara Pro.

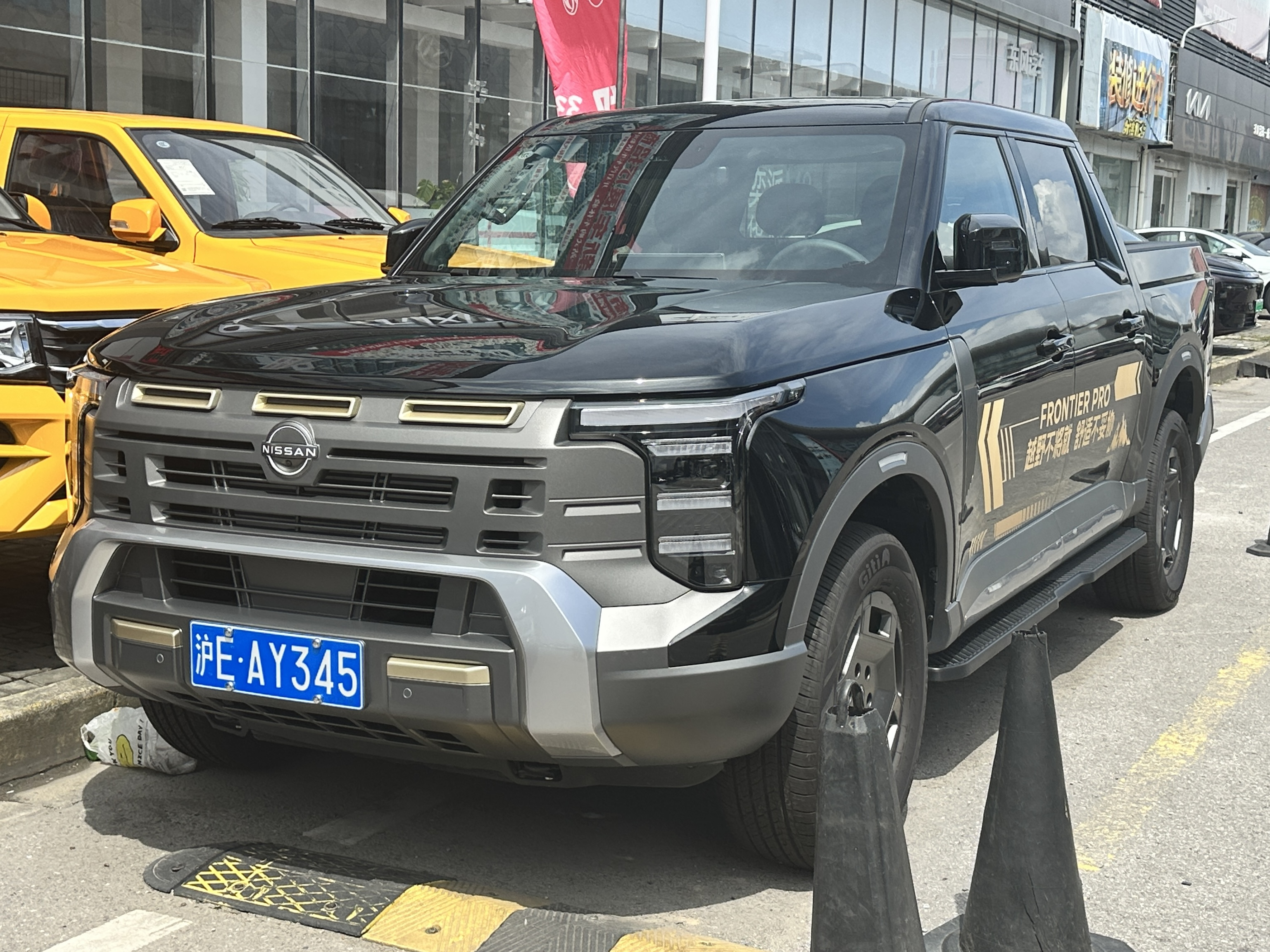
Nissan Frontier Pro

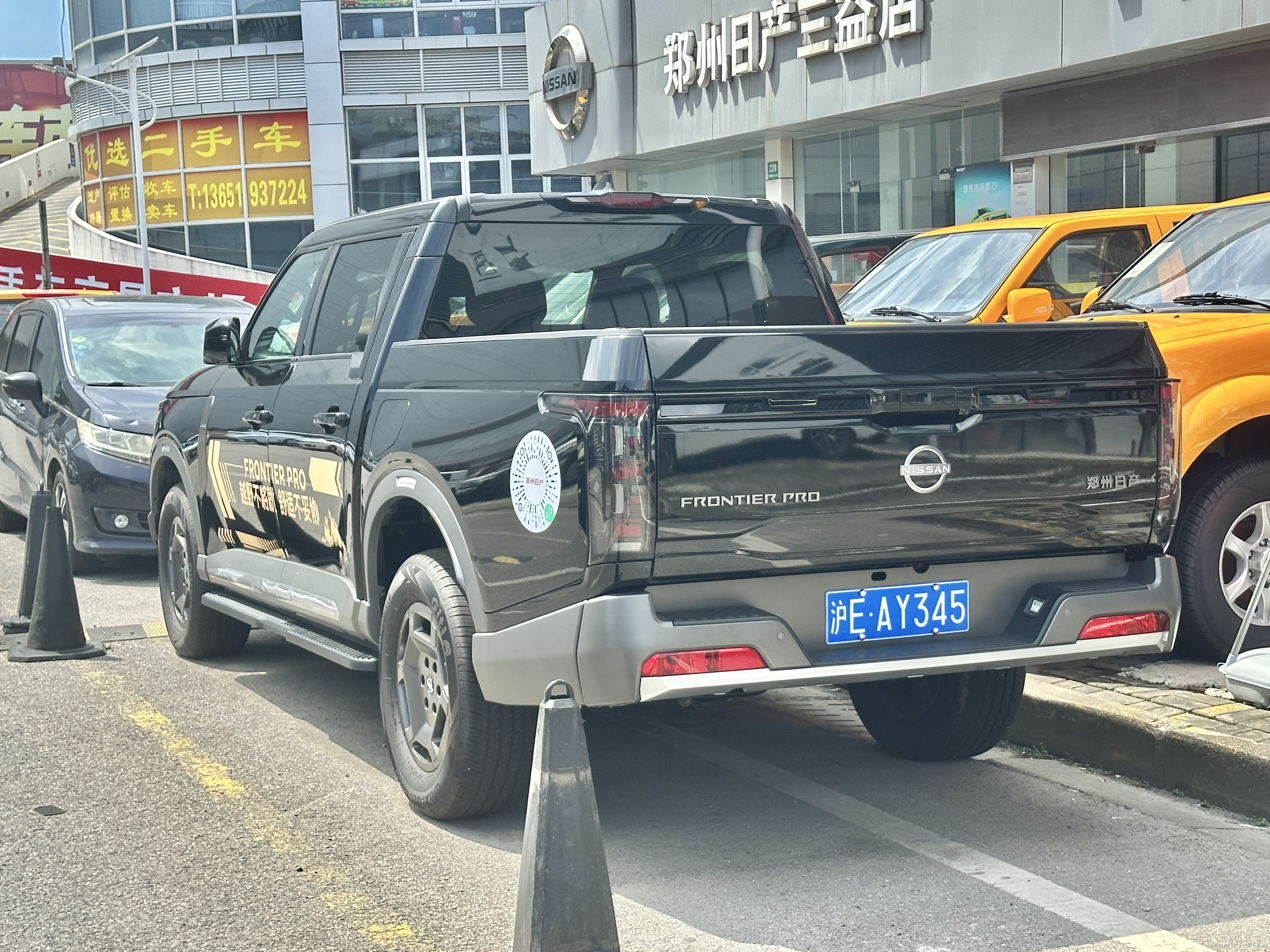
Rear view

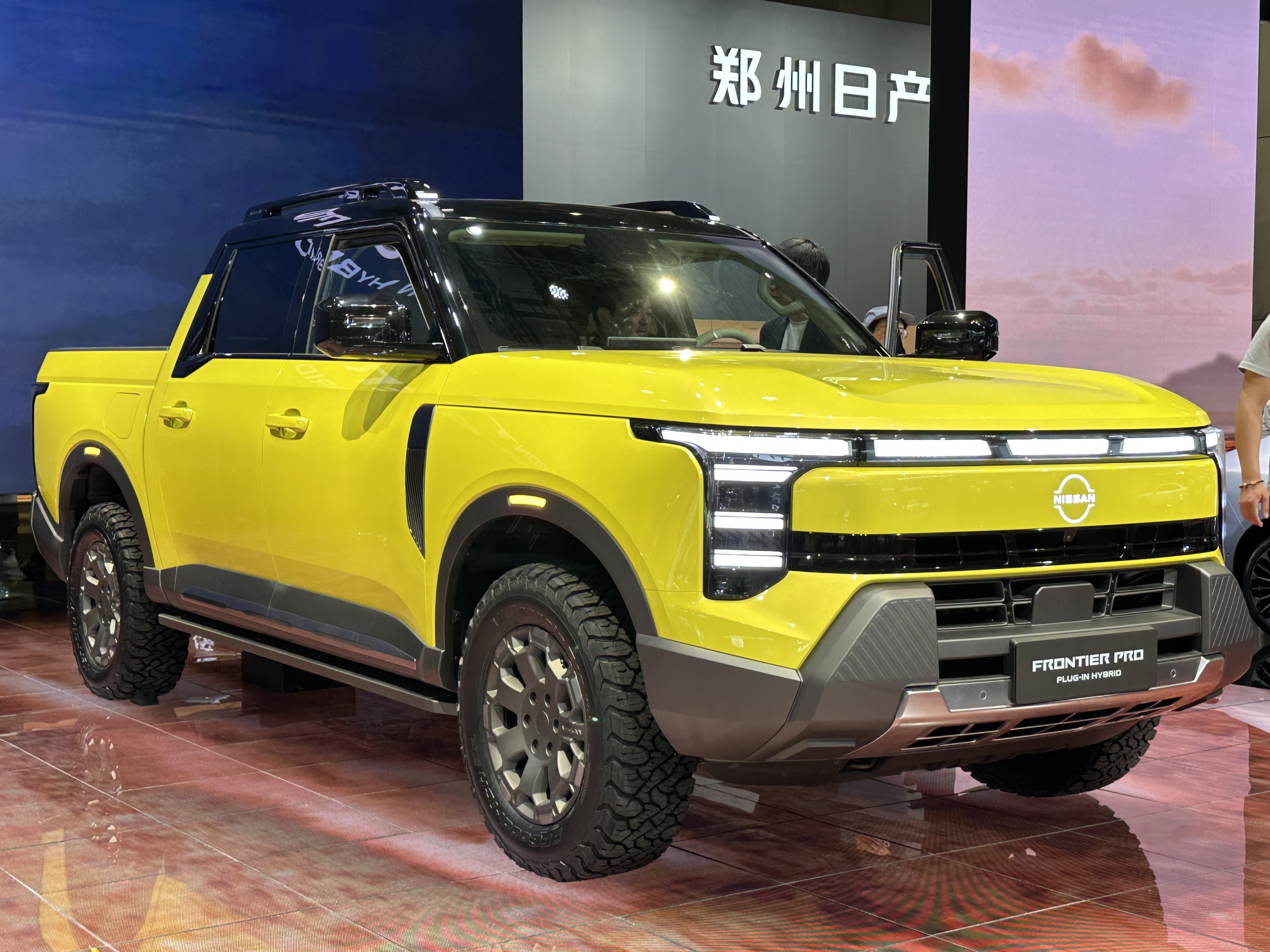
Nissan Frontier Pro (PHEV)

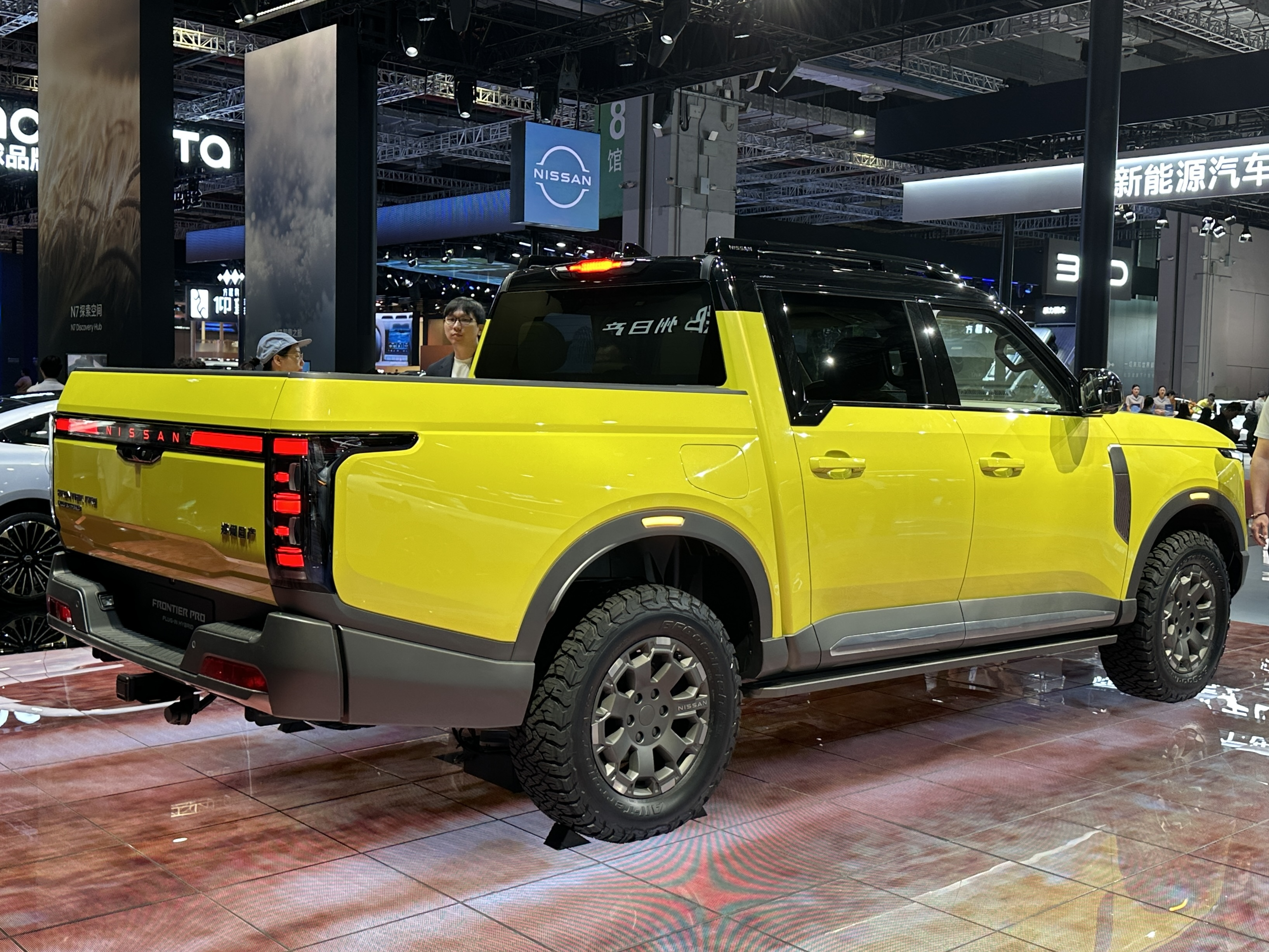
Rear view

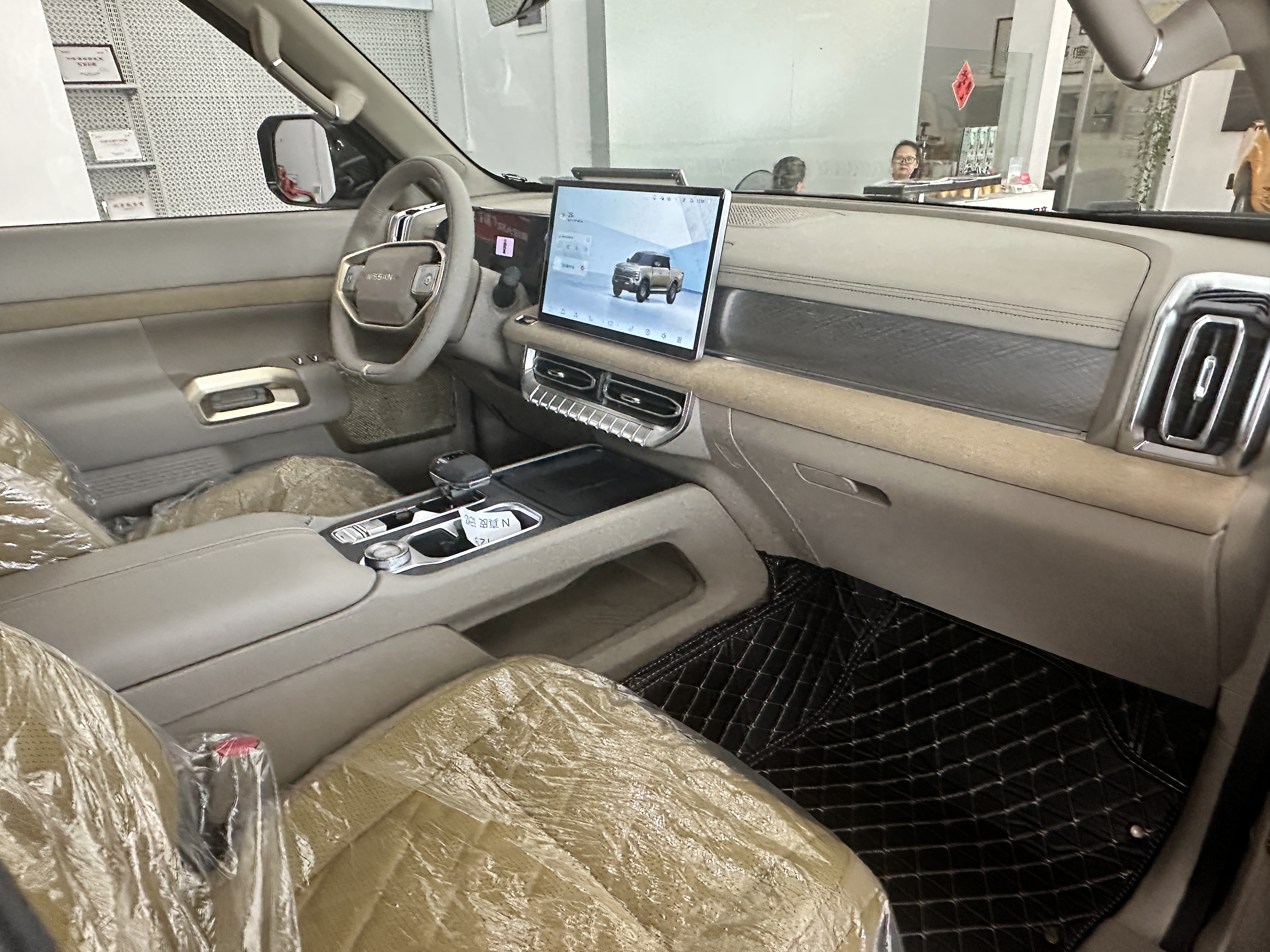
Interior

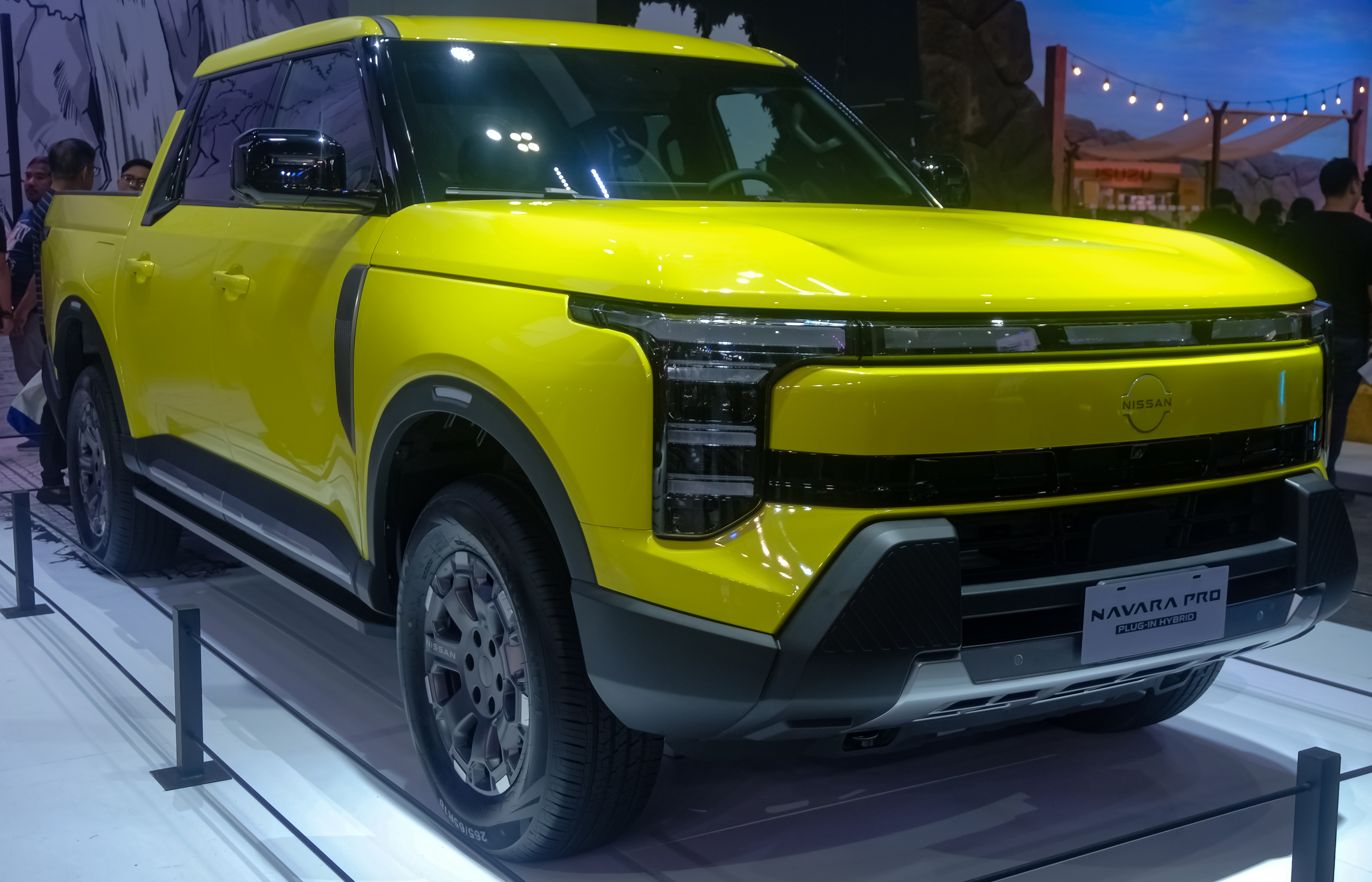
The Nissan Navara Pro in the Philippines.

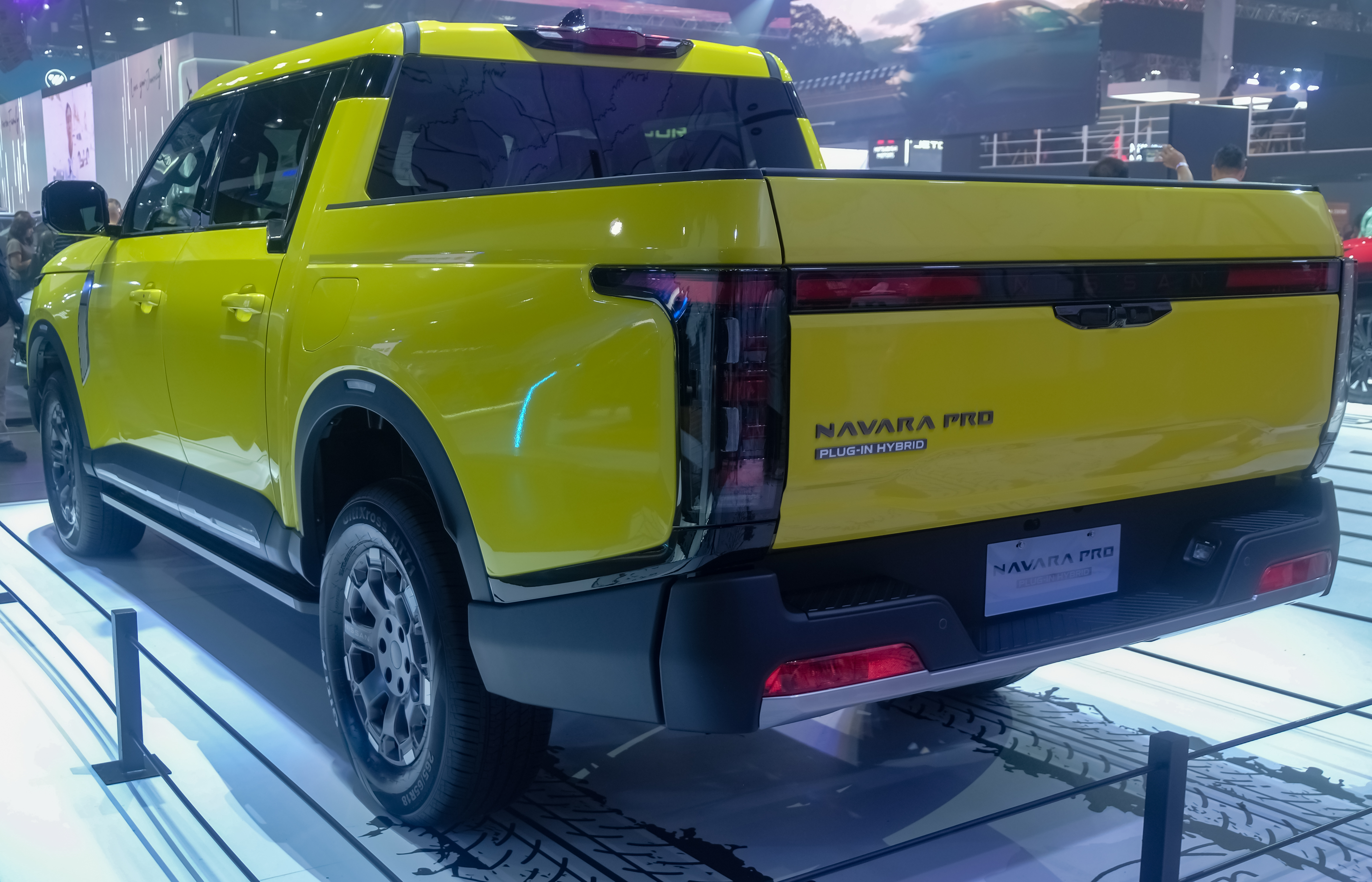
Rear view

== Powertrain ==
Internal combustion models are powered by either a 2.0 liter turbocharged inline 4 gasoline engine codenamed 4K31TD producing 258 horsepower or a 2.3 liter turbodiesel inline 4 codenamed M9T-500 producing 143 or 190 horsepower in low-output and high-output models respectively. A 6 speed manual is available, but is exclusive to the diesel version. An 8 speed automatic transmission comes standard on petrol models and is optional for the diesel version.

Plug-in hybrid models are powered by a 1.5 liter turbocharged inline 4 gasoline engine codenamed DFMC15TE3 combined with an electric motor, and make between 322 and 429 horsepower. Torque output remains the same at 590 lb-ft. The Z9 GE's battery options are a 17 kWh battery and a larger 32.85 kWh battery. The Frontier Pro comes exclusively with the 32.85 kWh battery due to four-wheel-drive being standard on the Frontier Pro, additionally being less powerful than the Z9 GE 4WD. PHEV models use a 4-speed dedicated hybrid transmission.

== Dongfeng Z9 GE ==
The Z9 GE is a plug-in hybrid version of the Z9. It shares the PHEV powertrain with the Frontier Pro. It was launched on May 31, 2025. Unlike the Frontier Pro, it is available with two power output options and two battery options.

== Santana 400 ==
The Santana 400 is the European version of the Z9. It is Santana Motor's first vehicle under the revived brand. It is offered in diesel and plug-in hybrid versions which are marketed as the 400D and 400 PHEV respectively. The 400 began production on October 30, 2025, the same day that the Santana plant in Linares, Jaén restarted overall production. In addition to being offered in Spain, it is expected to be sold in other European markets.

== Markets ==
=== Australia ===
The Frontier Pro was shown at a gala dinner in Adelaide, Australia on November 20, 2025, confirming that the Frontier Pro will be sold in Australia. Only the plug-in hybrid version was confirmed. Sales are projected to start in Australia sometime in 2027. It will be sold alongside the D27 Navara.

=== Bolivia ===
The Z9 reached showrooms in Bolivia under the ZNA Z9 name on September 11, 2025. Sales began on the same day.

=== Chile ===
In Chile, sales of the Z9 began on September 10, 2025, and is sold as the DFSK Z9. Only the diesel engine is available. Manual models use the low output M9T producing 148 horsepower while automatic models use the high output M9T producing 190 horsepower.

=== China ===
The Z9 officially launched in its home market of China on January 10, 2025. The plug-in hybrid Z9 GE launched on May 31, 2025, available in both rear-wheel-drive and four-wheel-drive unlike the Frontier Pro.

=== Philippines ===
As with Bolivia, the Z9 is available in The Philippines as the ZNA Z9. The first units reached showrooms in the Philippines on October 3, 2025. Only the plug-in hybrid version is known to be available in the country.

The Navara Pro PHEV was first shown at the 2026 Philippine International Motor Show on June 4, 2026, and was officially launched alongside the Primera on 6 November 2026.

=== Spain ===
The Z9 became the first model of the revived Santana Motors brand, and as a result, is marketed there as the Santana 400. Spain is the first market in Europe to receive the Z9, regardless of it being rebadged. It is available as a diesel and plug-in hybrid, marketed as the 400D and 400 PHEV respectively, with the latter's powertrain being based on the Frontier Pro Plug-in Hybrid instead of the Z9 GE.

Spain's version of the Z9 is manufactured domestically and is assembled at the reactivated Santana Motors plant in Linares. Production began in October 2025.

=== United Arab Emirates ===
The Z9 was revealed in the United Arab Emirates in October 2025 and became available in showrooms in January 2026. Only the gasoline-powered version is offered.
