= Iveco Massif =

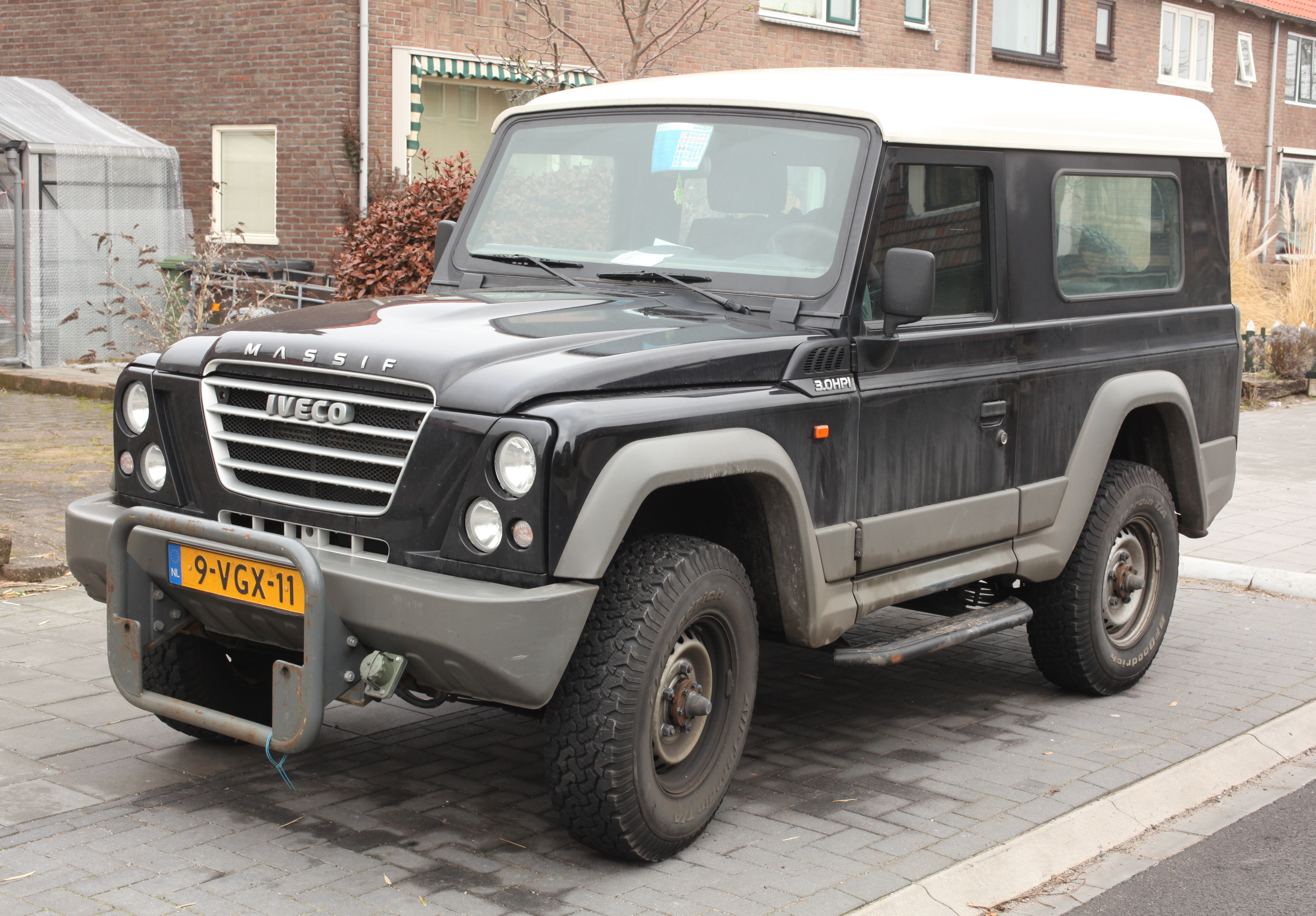

Overview
- Manufacturer: Iveco
- Also called: Iveco Campagnola
- Production: 2007–2011
- Assembly: Spain: Linares (Santana Motor)
- Designer: Giorgetto Giugiaro and Iveco Style Centre. Restyled version of the Santana PS-10

Body and chassis
- Class: Off-road vehicle
- Body style: 3 door estate 5 door estate 2 door pickup 2 door chassis
- Layout: Front engine, rear-wheel drive / four-wheel drive
- Related: Land Rover series Santana PS-10

Powertrain
- Engine: 3.0L HTP Sofim diesel I4
- Transmission: 6-speed manual

Dimensions
- Wheelbase: 2,452 mm (96.5 in) (3-door); 2,768 mm (109.0 in) (5-door and pick-up)
- Length: 4,228 mm (166.5 in) (3-door); 4,720 mm (185.8 in) (5-door); 4,548 mm (179.1 in) (pick-up)
- Width: 1,750 mm (68.9 in)
- Height: 2,050 mm (80.7 in)

Chronology
- Predecessor: Fiat Campagnola
- Successor: Jeep Wrangler

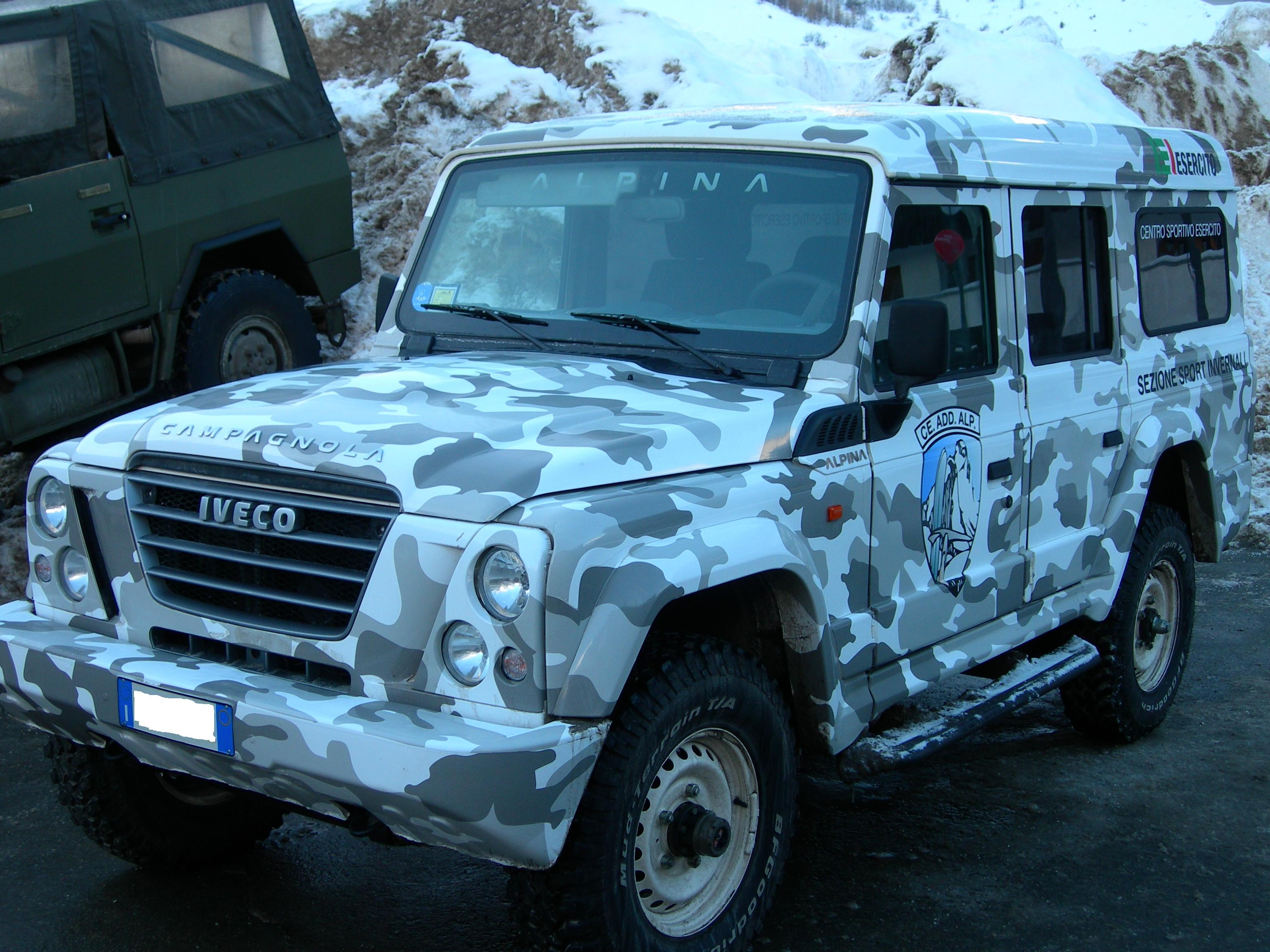
Iveco Campagnola Alpina; a sole example built for the Italian Army's Alpine Training Center sports department

The Iveco Massif is a utility 4×4 vehicle mainly aimed at the utility services and military markets and was part of Iveco’s 4×4 and off-road range, which also includes the Trakker lorry and Daily 4×4 van. Massif was produced by Santana Motor from 2007 to 2011 and its rebadged and restyled version of the Santana PS-10. In 2010, due to poor sales and Fiat Group's ability to serve the European 4×4 market with imported Jeeps, such as the Jeep Wrangler, that replaced Santana in the Spanish market, Iveco decided to stop the agreement with Santana. In 2011 the owner of Santana, the Government of Andalusia, decided to close down the company and its car factory and 1,341 people were laid off or retired prematurely. From 6,692 cars made in 2007, the company manufactured 1,197 in 2009 and no more than 769 in 2010.

== Overview ==
The Massif was produced in Linares, Spain, by Santana Motor and was marketed by Iveco (the commercial section of the Fiat motor company) and competed with the Land Rover Defender at the utility end of the 4×4 market.

The Massif is essentially a revamped and restyled version of the Santana PS-10, which (like the Defender) is itself a derivative of the Land Rover series which Santana formerly built under licence. The Massif was part of a joint venture between Iveco and Santana; Iveco announced in Madrid in May 2006 that it was essentially taking over the PS-10 product. Iveco already supplied the engine and drive-train to Santana for its PS-10 model, so this seemed a logical progression.

The Massif was produced alongside the Santana PS-10.

== Specification ==
The Massif was styled by Giorgetto Giugiaro and the Iveco Style Centre. The Massif bears a clear family resemblance to its sister product, the Santana PS-10, which itself was heavily based on the Land Rover Series. Beyond the modernized front clip, the family resemblance to the Land Rover Defender is strong.

The Massif was available with two versions of Iveco’s 3.0 litre diesel engine taken from the Iveco Daily van. A 150 PS (110 kW; 148 bhp) HPI version with 350 N⋅m (258 lb⋅ft) of torque and a 176 PS (129 kW; 174 bhp) HPT version with 400 N⋅m (295 lb⋅ft) of torque were available. The extra horsepower of the HPT version comes from a variable geometry turbocharger. Both engines met Euro IV emissions standards.

The Massif is fitted with a 6-speed ZF 6S400 overdrive manual gearbox with high and low range ratios. No automatic was available. The Massif also has selectable four-wheel drive, like its forebears in the Land Rover series. This was intended to reduce fuel consumption, claimed as “up to 10%” by Iveco. The decision to have selectable four-wheel drive is based on already available solution, permanent 4x4 need costly components (central differential) and development. Therefore Massif is usually in four-by-two, rear-wheel drive unless four-wheel drive is engaged.

The Massif is also fitted with manual-locking free-wheeling hubs on the front axles which prevent the rotation of front axle components, supposedly to reduce wear. An optional limited-slip rear differential was also available to improve off-road ability by reducing the chance of getting cross-axled.

The Massif has all round disc brakes with ventilated discs on the front axle and solid discs on the rear axle. The hand brake is also a disc brake, operating on the transmission.

The Massif is fitted with parabolic suspension all round, as opposed to the coil springs of its contemporary, the Land Rover Defender. The parabolic suspension system is arranged with double bladed springs on the front axle and four bladed springs on the rear axle. The Massif is fitted with hydraulic dampers on the front axle, gas dampers on the rear axle and anti-roll bars at both front and rear to give a compromise of on-road handling and off-road ability. The parabolic suspension system can be regarded as a cost-effective compromise between the simplicity and load carrying ability of leaf springs and the better comfort and axle articulation (and thus off-road ability) of coil springs.

The Massif is built as a body-on-frame construction with a ladder chassis, rather than a monocoque construction which is now common with most modern 4×4s. This layout is another similarity with Land Rover’s Defender.

The rear door of the Massif was designed to have a full metre-wide opening to allow a standard Euro-pallet to be comfortably carried in the rear of the vehicle – intended as a unique selling point of the vehicle because of its anticipated market of the utility/commercial sector.

The Massif can also be specified with a variety of transmission or transfer box power take-off units and electrical connections on the body work to increase its attraction to commercial users further.

The interior of the Massif had been overhauled from the Santana PS-10 version to make it more competitive with the recently updated Land Rover Defender.

== Models ==
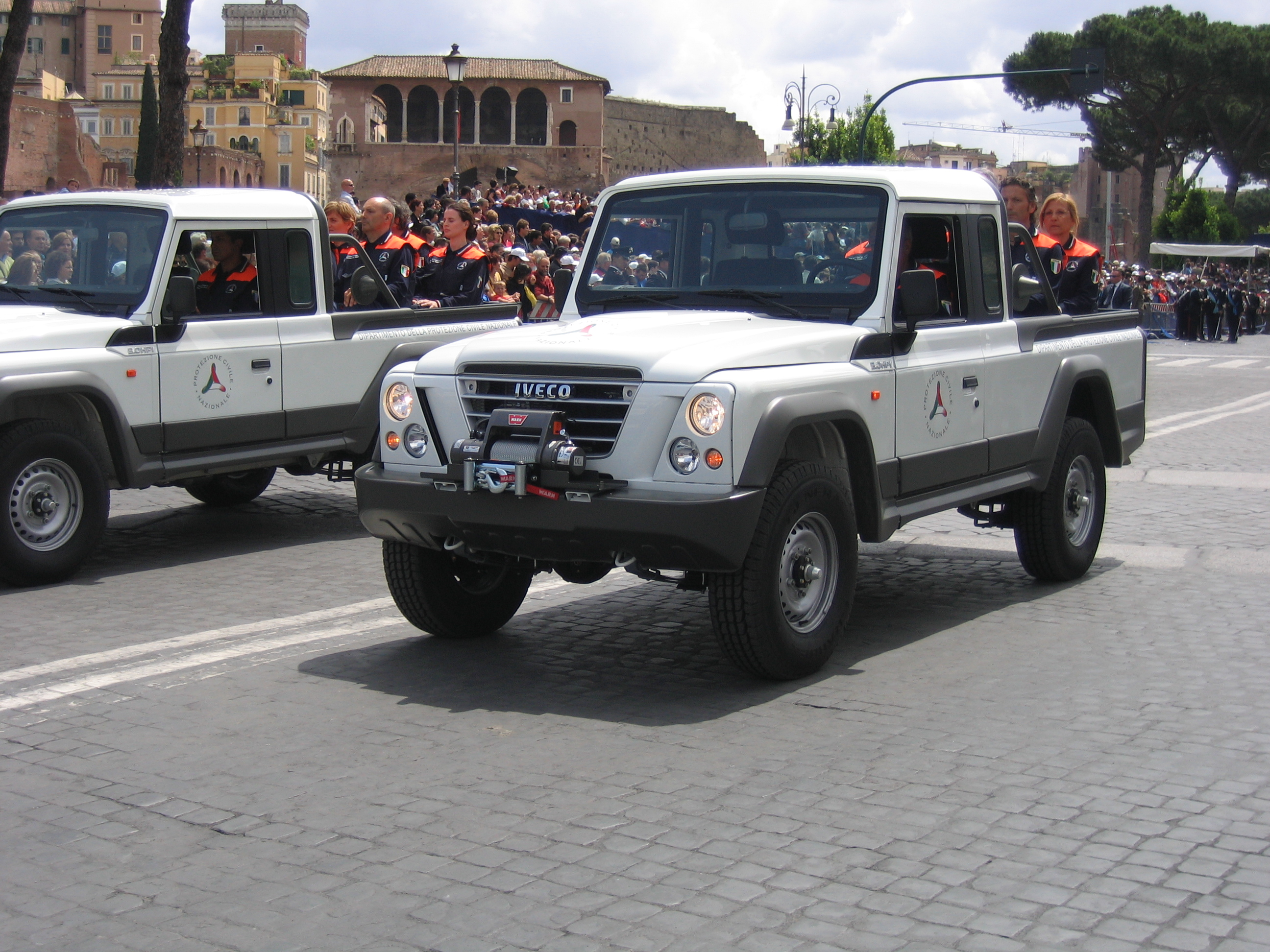
Servizio Civile Nazionale Iveco Massif at Italy's 2007 Army Parade.

The Massif was available in long (2,768 mm (109.0 in)) and short wheelbase (2,452 mm (96.5 in)) variants. A hardtop, station wagon, pickup and chassis cab were available. The long wheelbase station wagon seats up to 7 people. A "heavy duty" version of the Massif with a 3.5 tonne GVW and towing capacity was also in development for commercial users. The Massif was also aimed at the service sector and the Iveco website showed computer generated models of the Massif with custom bodywork to allow the Massif to be used as emergency service vehicles such as ambulances and fire-fighting vehicles for off-road use; traditionally a sector that the Land Rover Defender, with its specially dedicated Land Rover Special Vehicles division, has dominated.

Launch models had been heavily promoted with advertising showing the All Blacks New Zealand rugby union squad as Iveco had signed up as the main sponsor of the team. Launch vehicles were displayed with black body work and the "tribal" graphics associated with the team.

Iveco also announced that a military specification of the Massif would have been available, being fully air-portable similarly to its sister vehicle, the Santana PS-10.

Although the PS-10 was available in left- and right-hand drive models, the Massif was available only in left-hand drive and only in mainland Europe. Iveco had initially intended the Massif to be launched in the UK in early 2009.

=== Campagnola ===
Hearkening back to the Fiat Campagnola, Iveco launched a luxurious version of the three-door model sold as the Iveco Campagnola in 2008, with deliveries beginning in 2009. This model received standard anti-lock braking, power locks, air conditioning, a body-coloured roof, and a rear wiper, amongst other extras. An original "Opening Edition" of 499 cars was planned.
