= Santana Motor =

Spanish motor vehicle manufacturer

Santana Motor, S.A.
- Type: Sociedad Anónima
- Industry: Automotive
- Predecessor: Metalúrgica de Santa Ana, S.A.
- Founded: 1954; 72 years ago (original incarnation); 2025; 1 year ago (current incarnation)
- Founder: Government of Spain
- Defunct: 16 February 2011 (original incarnation)
- Headquarters: Linares, Jaén, Spain
- Area served: Europe, Africa, Middle East, Latin America
- Key people: Bienvenido Martínez Martínez (chairman)
- Products: Automobiles, electric vehicles, automotive parts
- Production output: ▼769 units (2010)
- Services: Design, manufacture and distribution of Santana cars and components
- Revenue: ▼€12.249 million (2010)
- Operating income: ▼€3.939 million (2010)
- Net income: ▼ (€42.026) million (2010)
- Total assets: ▼€7.786 million (2010)
- Total equity: ▼€33.677 million (2010)
- Number of employees: ▼1,341 (2010)
- Website: santanacars.com/en

Santana Motor, S.A. (/sænˈtænə/ san-TAN-ə, Spanish: [sanˈtana]) is a Spanish motor vehicle manufacturer based in Linares, in the province of Jaén, Spain.

It was originally created in 1956 as "Metalúrgica de Santa Ana, S.A." to manufacture agricultural machinery, but soon, in 1961, it began to produce off-road cars under licence from Land Rover in its factory in Linares sold under the name "Land Rover Santana". It manufactured various comparable models, which were enormously popular among Spanish farmers and ranchers, and exported many to South America, North Africa and the Middle East, always with the authorisation of the British licensee, which had been unable to meet the demand of these regions.

In 1989, after financial difficulties forced Land Rover to cancel its participation in Santana Motor, the company began to market versions of the Land Rover under the Santana brand, such as the Santana 2500, an off-road vehicle that had broad appeal throughout Spain's varying terrain during the 1990s. The last models manufactured under the name "Land Rover Santana" were sent at the request of the Spanish Government as a donation to Colombia, as were a few others to Mexico.

The arrival on the market of new off-road models and a certain technological obsolescence led Santana to seek international alliances, which were found in 1985 with the Japanese brand Suzuki. Models such as the Samurai, Vitara and Jimny were manufactured under this agreement. In 1995, the Junta de Andalucía bought the entirety of the company from Suzuki; but this nationalisation of Santana quickly led to great financial difficulties, and by 2001 it registered losses of over €300 million. To compensate for this, the company launched its own off-road vehicle, the Aníbal, which was commissioned by the Spanish, French and Czech armies.

From 2006 to 2009, Santana produced cars under agreement with Iveco, most notably the Massif. However, the consistent and ever-growing decline in Santana's sales and its financial losses of €42 million by 2010 led to a vote within the company's workers to disband Santa Motor once and for all. The vote was won by an 83% majority, and the company filed for settlement the 16 February 2011.

Today, Santana vehicles are highly sought after, particularly in the United Kingdom. A restored 1961 Santana-assembled Series II 88, described by the specialist marketplace Car & Classic as a rare and collectable variant, sold at auction for €14,950 in 2024 In 2025, Bonhams sold a 1964 Santana 88 Series II pickup for US$24,640.

Santana Motor restarted production in October 2025, with the new Santana 400 being the first model of the restarted Santana brand. It is the first model produced since the original company's liquidation.

== History ==
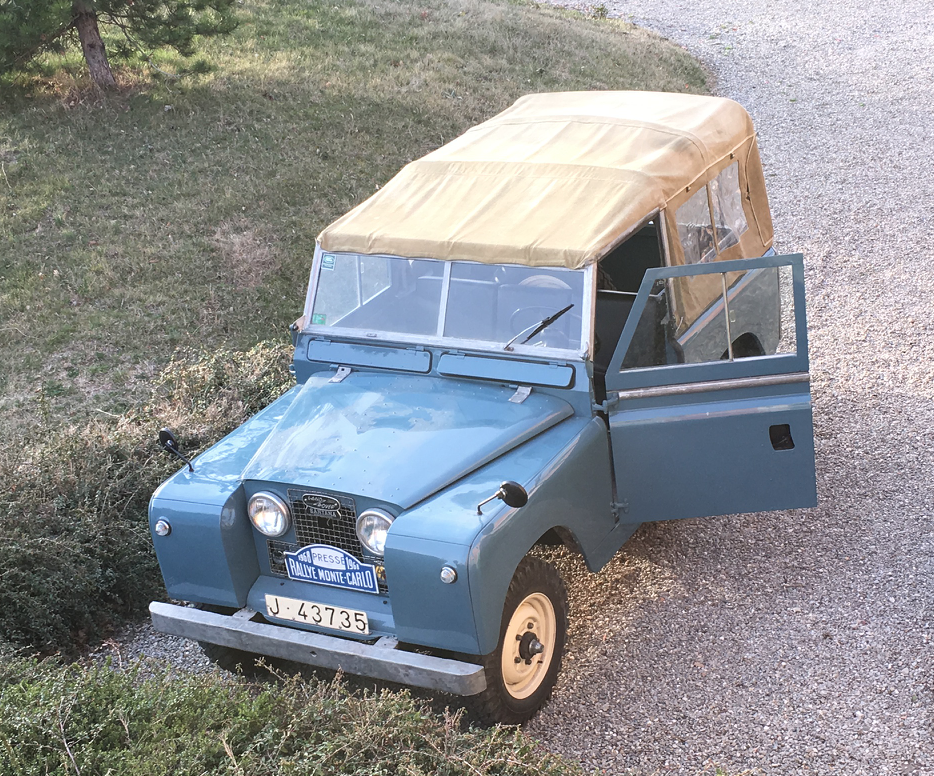
The first Land Rover Santana manufactured in Linares: Series 2 SWB (1961-1974)

The company was founded as "Metalúrgica de Santa Ana, SA" and originally manufactured agricultural equipment. The company was set up with a start up of just 3 million pesetas, following a drive by the Spanish government in 1954 who were offering start-up incentives to local businesses to encourage development in the Andalucia region of Southern Spain. The company decided to expand beyond its original products line and entered into talks with the Rover car company in 1956 in an attempt to get a licensing agreement to build Land Rover Series models in their factory, in a similar way to the Minerva company in Belgium, Tempo in Germany and Morattab company in Iran, all built Series Land Rovers under licence. An agreement was reached in 1956 and production began in 1958 it was licensed to build Land Rover models. The Santana Motor company built Series Land Rovers under licence in CKD form (Complete Knocked Down kits); essentially parts were shipped over from the Land Rover factory in Solihull and the Land Rovers were built up from this 'kit' at the Santana factory in Spain. From 1960 to 1961 a growing percentage of parts started being manufactured in Spain. By 1968 100% of the vehicles components were locally produced. Apart from minor details (electric system, rear tailgate) the Spanish built Land Rover were identical to their Solihull counterparts and their quality was comparable.

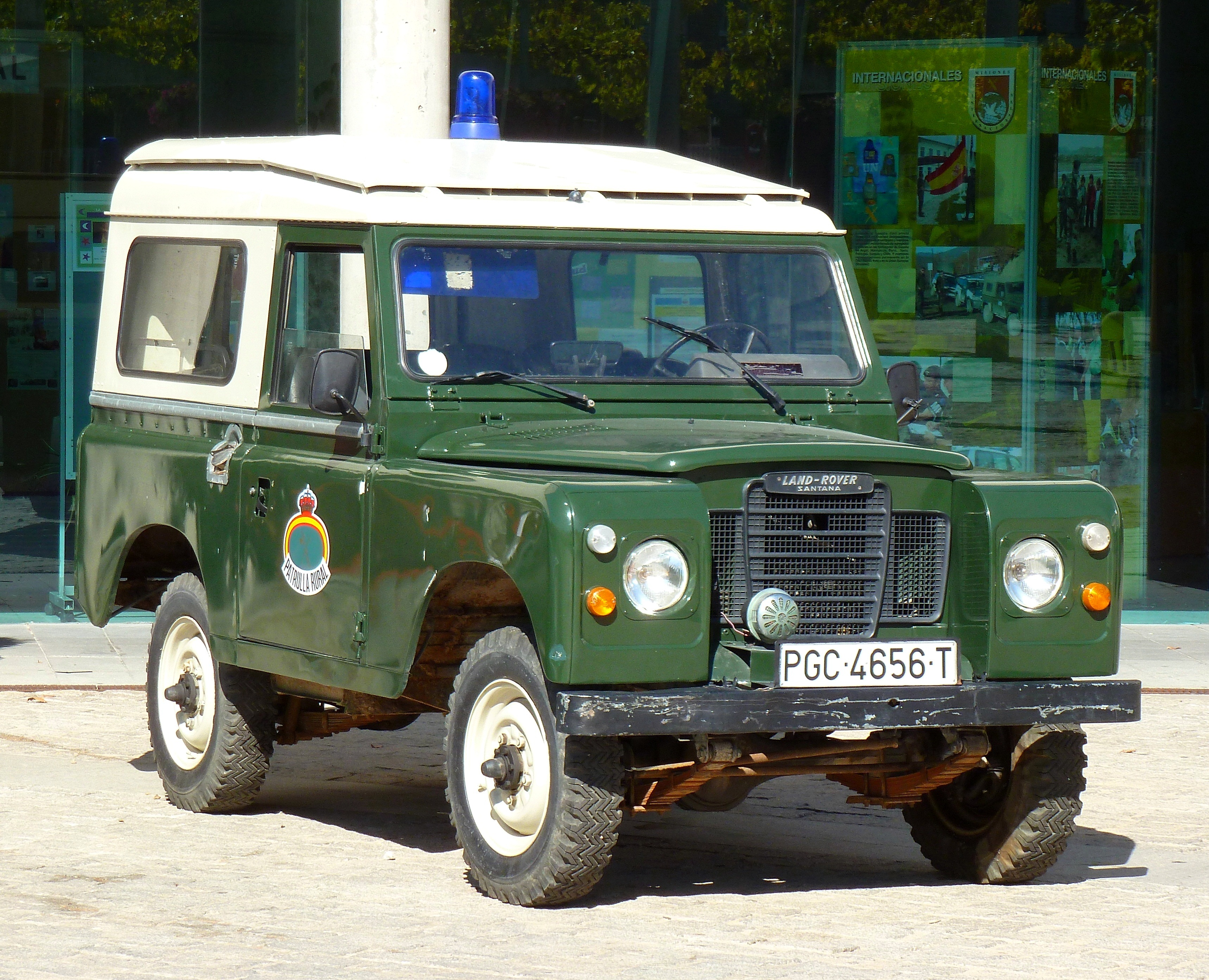
Spanish Civil Guard Santana Land Rover 88 Series 3

From 1968 Santana began to develop its own versions of the Land Rover Series Models, developing new engines and new models and this close relationship with Land Rover led the company to change its name from "Metalúrgica de Santa Ana, SA" to "Land Rover Santana, SA". From 1964 until the mid-1970s, Santana also manufactured a Commer walk-through truck for the local market.

In 1962 the company became responsible for promoting the Santana and Land Rover brands in Central and South American Markets as well as Africa. CKD kits were also supplied to the Moroccan and Costa Rican markets by the company. Because of the harsh working lives vehicles endured in these environments, customer feedback on the range meant that Santana were often far more aware of each model's failings than the Land Rover company itself was. Because of the tight financial position in this period of British Leyland (which owned Land Rover), Santana's were often better placed than Land Rover was to deal with these failings. This meant that Santana began to engineer its own solutions to common problems into the models it produced and thus arose a degree of originality in Santana's models compared to Land Rover's original products – a trend that led to the company's position today. Up to the late 1980s the Santana models – supposed to be quickly and cheaply built versions of Land Rover's own product - often ended up being improved when compared to Land Rover's own vehicles. For instance, Santana models featured anatomical seats, disc-brakes, turbo diesel engines, taper-leaf springs, coil springs, and civilian-specification Forward Control versions before the Land Rover equivalents and there was even a civilian version of the Land Rover Lightweight called the "Ligero" which was never released by Land Rover.

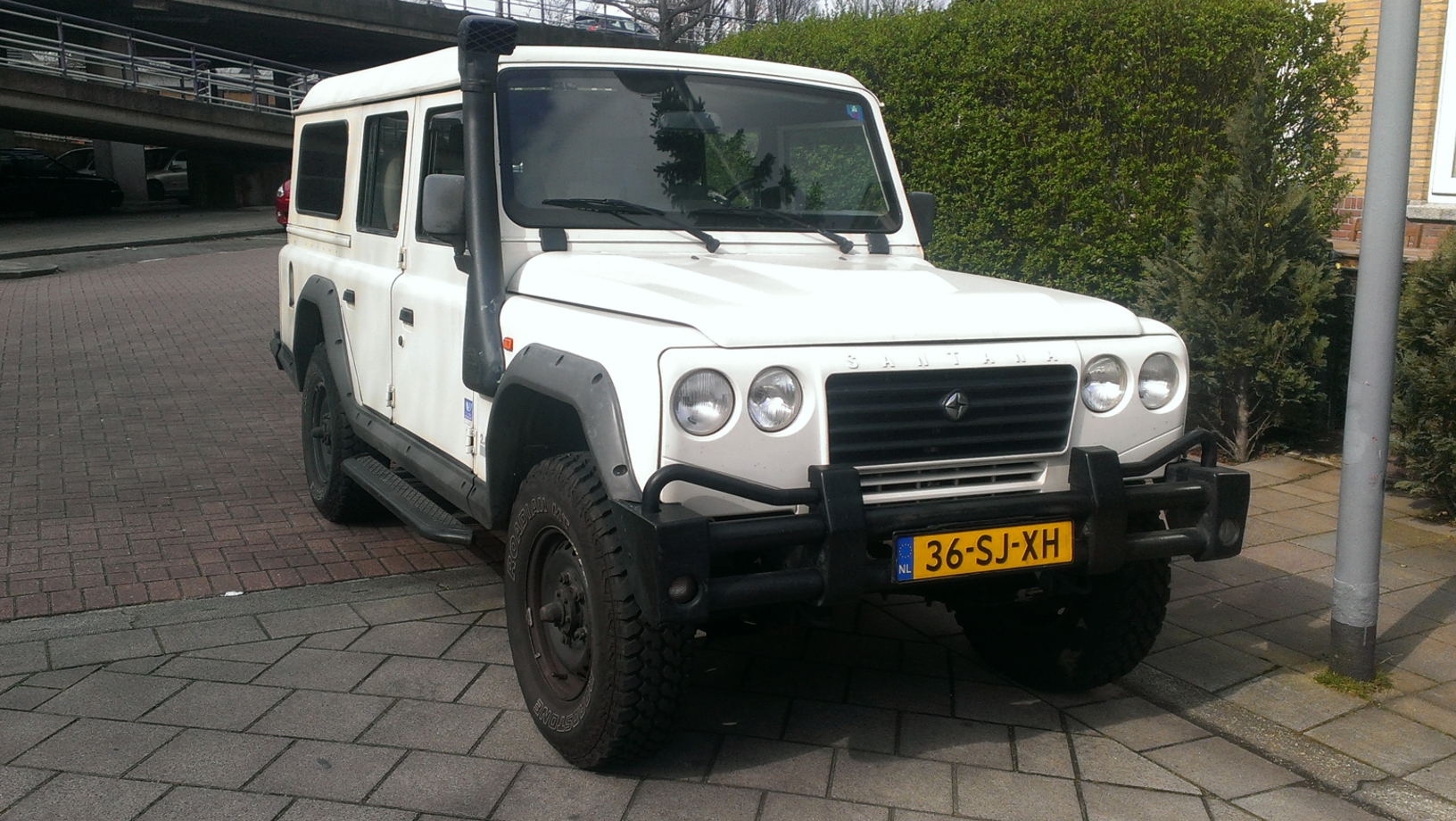
Santana PS-10 5-door model

Land Rover and Santana Motor Company ended their non-competitive agreement with Land Rover in 1983. The newer Land Rover 110 and 90 were, in some markets, directly competing against Santana's for the first time. Santana's continued to offer a more robust platform with leaf springs (instead of coil springs found on Defender models) and heavier-duty axles.

The two companies continued to share most components and coordinate global sales in certain markets, with Santana continuing to sell to South America, Central America, Spain, and parts of Africa. Land Rover and Santana had a unique relationship with other markets as well, including Iran. Iran was the region's largest automotive market and the largest in the region for Land Rover. Secondary to sanctions put in place after the revolution in Iran, Land Rover was unable to sell directly to Iran or to Land Rover's long-time partner in the country, Morattab Khodro. Parts and complete knockdown kits were sold to Iran through Santana.

In 1990 Land Rover and Santana terminated their licensing agreement.

In 1994 Morattab Khodro purchased the entire production line for the Santana 2500 DL and DC range of vehicles.

=== Suzuki years ===
The Santana Motor Company began a relationship with Suzuki in the early 1980s when Suzuki bought a 20% stake in the company and from 1986 Santana started to produce licensed versions of Suzuki models such as the Suzuki Jimny/SJ and Suzuki Vitara. Although many of its products like the Santana Series VI/2500 were still visually similar to those of the Land Rover range the company moved even closer to Suzuki in 1991 when Suzuki gained a 49% stake in the company, becoming the controlling shareholder. A name change followed to Santana Motor, SA in the same year.

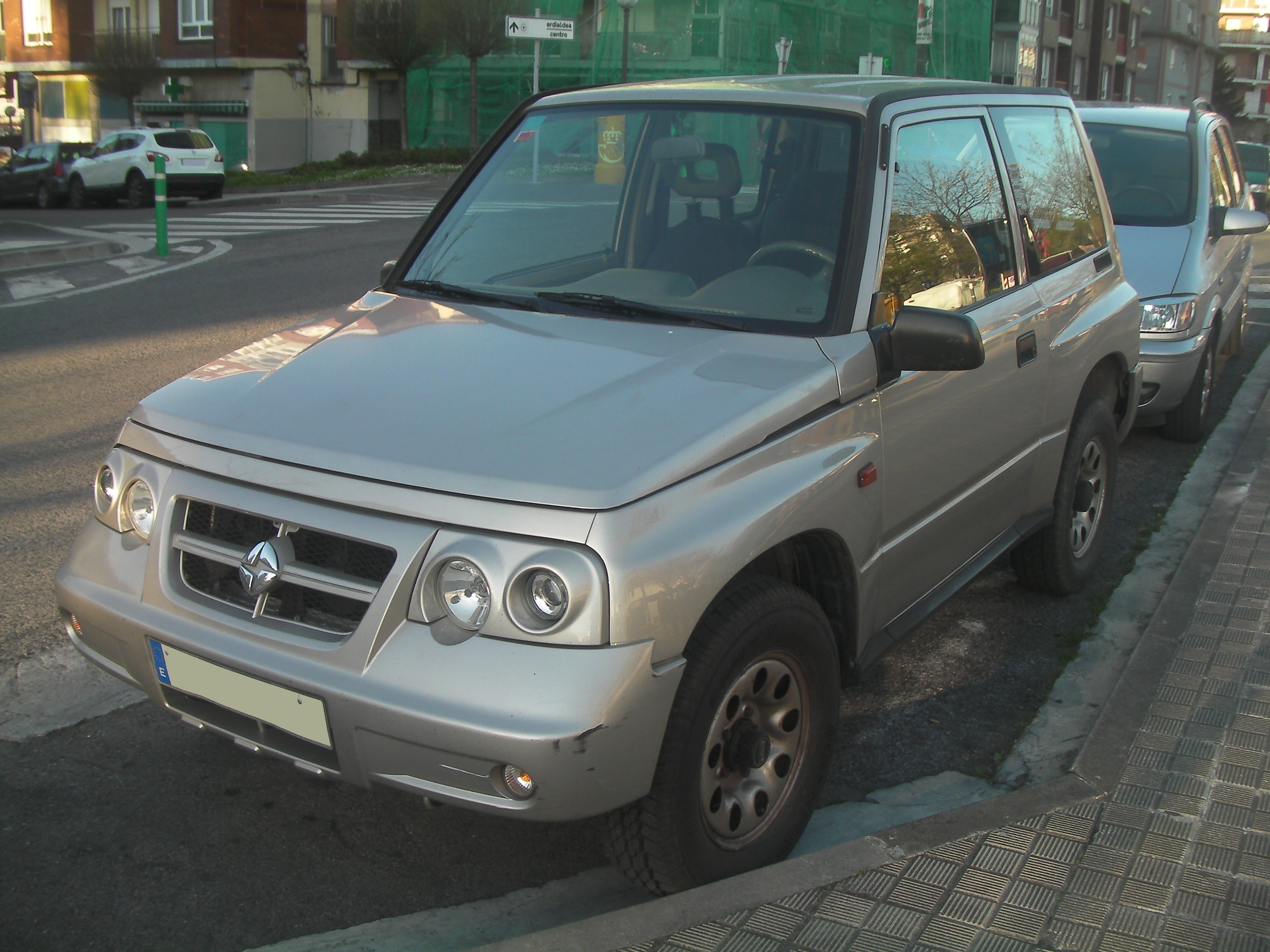
Santana 300, based on the Suzuki Vitara

By the mid-1990s Santana's relationship with Land Rover seemed to have completely ceased as it was now only producing licensed Suzuki models and production of the Santana Series VI/2500 - the last Santana with visual similarities to Land Rover's current utility equivalent, now sold as the Defender - ended in 1994. The end of production of the Series VI/2500 was forced by the new owners Suzuki who restructured the company and the production machinery and tooling for the Series VI/2500 was sold to Morattab – an Iranian motor company.

In March 1995, Suzuki decided to divest from Santana. Suzuki kept the distribution network under the exclusive name of Suzuki and sold the car factory to the Government of the Region of Andalusia for one peseta.

Nevertheless, the company continued to manufacture new models of cars for Suzuki. Suzuki signed a new licence contract with an agreement to produce new diesel-engined Santana-built models of Suzuki off-roaders. In 1997 this contract was extended until 2006. Additionally, Santana's continuous development of the Land Rover Defender design led to the production of the PS-10. The PS-10 was released as a concept vehicle in 1999, but production of the PS-10 did not actually begin until 2002.

=== Gamesa accord ===
In October 2005, Santana Motor and Gamesa Corporacion Tecnologica agreed to launch a joint industrial project for the manufacture of components for renewable energy equipment at the Linares plant. To this end, the two firms formed a new investee company, Aemsa Santana, in which Gamesa was the majority shareholder with 70% and Santana Motor participated held the remaining 30%.

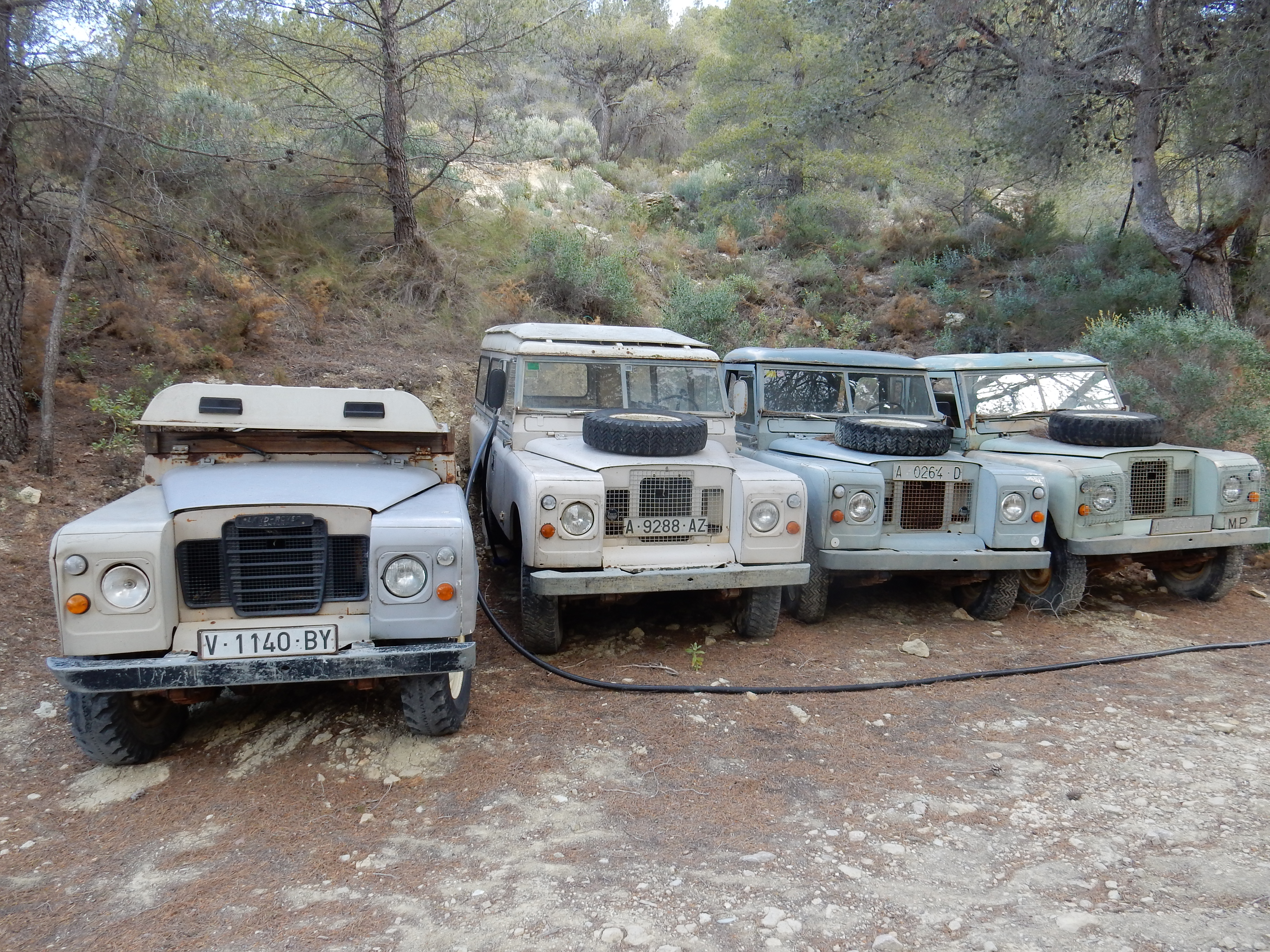
A group of Land Rover Santanas Series III

Subsequently, in June 2007, the Daniel Alonso Group of Avilés and Santana agreed to start up a joint industrial project for the manufacture of wind towers in various production centres in Spain, including that of Linares. This agreement led to the constitution of a company called Windar, of which Aemsa-Santana was a part.

The new company, Windar, built a plant in Linares with a total surface area of 10,000 square meters, which was used for the assembly of sections of towers for Gamesa's latest generation wind turbines. This production plant had a capacity of 800 tower sections per year, already employed more than a hundred workers and reached 120 when the plant was at full capacity, with an investment of approximately €4 million.

The presence of Gamesa and Grupo Daniel Alonso in the industrial complex in Linares was a great boost for Santana Motor, not only to maintain the industrial activity that it had until now, but also to open a new production line that enabled the consolidation of employment levels. Likewise, this agreement represented the establishment in Andalusia for the first time of a large company dedicated, among other activities, to the design, manufacture and maintenance of wind turbines.

=== Iveco cooperation ===
In 2006 Iveco and Santana signed a long-term agreement to co-develop products. The first offshoot of this co-production was the Iveco Massif, a rebadged and restyled version of the Santana PS-10. The Santana produced Massif would go into direct competition with the Land Rover Defender, the direct descendant of the original utility Series Land Rover which spawned the entire Santana Motor Company.

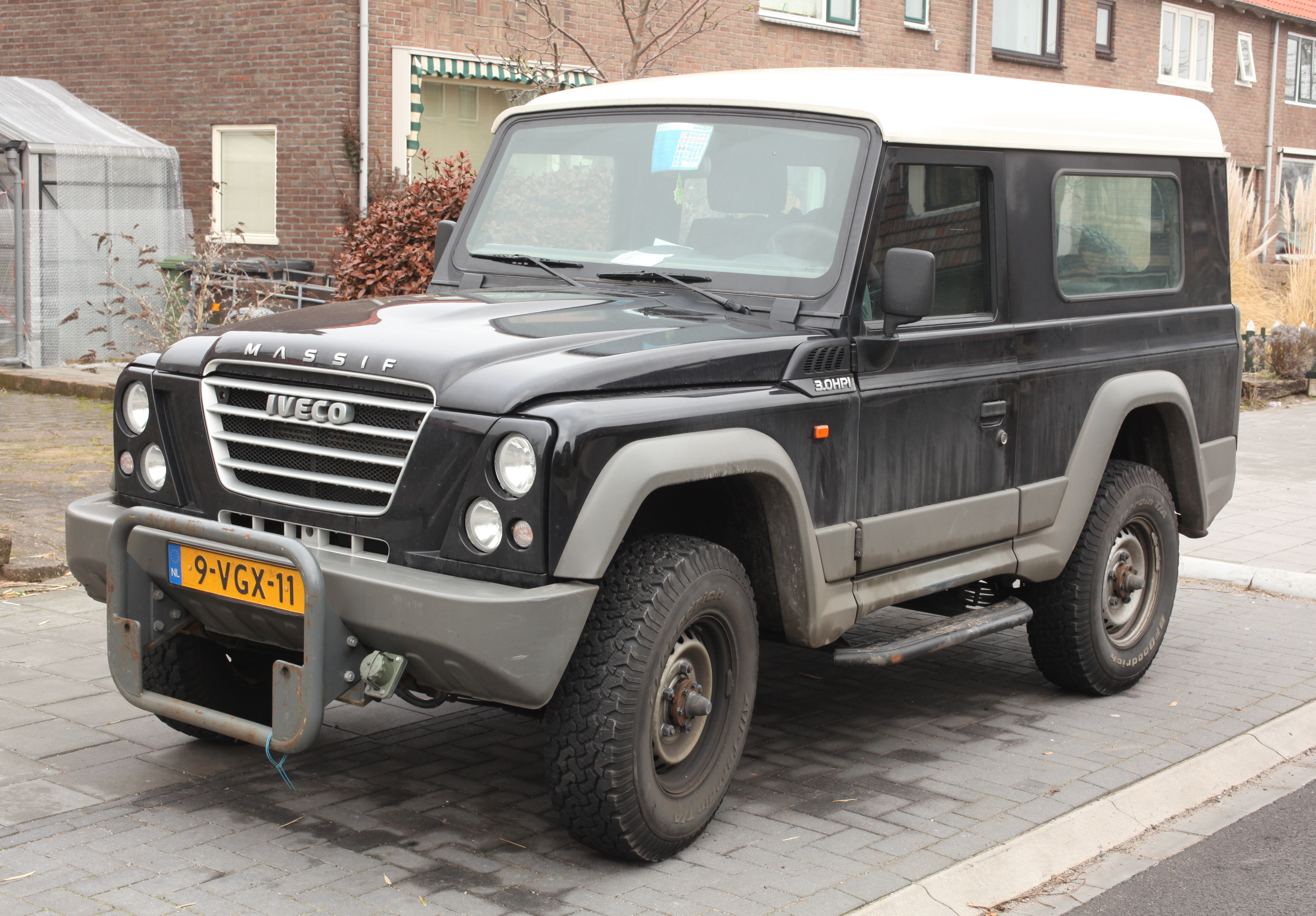
Iveco Massif

In 2008 FIAT-Iveco announced that it had signed an option to buy Andalusian government-owned Santana Motor, depending on the success of the Massif.

=== Closure and liquidation ===
With the change of industrial partner from Suzuki to Fiat-Iveco, Santana ended its relationship with Suzuki in 2009 and from that moment it no longer made any Suzuki car under licence. The ending of the partnership with Santana meant that in many countries like Spain, Suzuki no longer provided customer support for cars made by Santana under the Suzuki licence and brand, and directed owners to Santana because it considered them to be Santana cars. This represented a serious problem for owners of many Suzuki models that were exclusively made by Santana (such as the Suzuki Jimny convertible), for which it is now difficult to find parts.

When Santana broke with Suzuki, Suzuki kept the distribution network that had been created by Santana over the preceding decades. From then onwards, Santana was not able to sell the cars that it was manufacturing under its own brand name, nor through its established dealers. Only the access to the commercial network of Iveco would have allowed the company to go on. By 2010, however, sales of the Iveco Massif were not as expected and Iveco decided to end the agreement with Santana.

In 2011 the owner of the company, the Regional Government of Andalusia, decided to close the Santana Motor company and its car factory and 1,341 people were laid off or retired prematurely. From 6,692 cars made in 2007, the company manufactured 1,197 in 2009 and as few as 769 in 2010.

== Revival ==
In May 2025, Zhengzhou Nissan, the subsidiary of Dongfeng, BAIC Group, and Anhui Coronet Tech formed a three-party consortium, deciding to invest 5 million euros to restart the Santana Motor's factory in Linares. Santana would launch the diesel-powered and plug-in hybrid pickup truck based on Dongfeng Z9. Starting from mid-2026, BAIC would sell off-road models the Beijing BJ40 and Beijing BJ30 in Europe under the Santana brand, assembled via SKD (semi-knockdown) at the Spanish factory.

The first model of the revived brand, the Santana 400, is a rebadged Dongfeng Z9, itself previously commonly known as the Nissan Yuanye Z9 or Nissan Frontier Pro. It is available as a diesel and a plug-in hybrid, with both versions being named the 400D and 400 PHEV respectively. It comes with four-wheel-drive as standard.

Production of the 400 officially began on October 30, 2025, marking the first time in 14 years that the Linares plant was in operation since its closure in 2011. In addition to being sold in Spain, the 400 will also be sold in Italy, Portugal, Andorra, and Gibraltar.

In November 2026, assembly of JAC E30X using the complete knock-down method will begin at the Linares plant using kits imported from China. The car will be sold in major European markets in versions with 41 kWh and 51.5 kWh batteries (WLTP combined-cycle range of 293 km and 374 km, respectively).

== Current models ==
- Santana 400: Rebadged Dongfeng Z9. Available as a plug-in hybrid or diesel.
- Santana Cajal: Rebadged Beijing BJ40
- JAC E30X

== Former models ==
=== Land Rover-derived Santana models ===
- Santana Series II: 1958–1962; based on the Land Rover Series II.
- Santana Series IIA: 1962–1974; based on the Land Rover Series IIA.
- Santana Series III: 1974–1983; based on the Land Rover Series III. (from 1978 an improved version of the Land Rover Series III, developed within Santana, including a 75-horsepower turbocharged 2.5 Diesel engine)
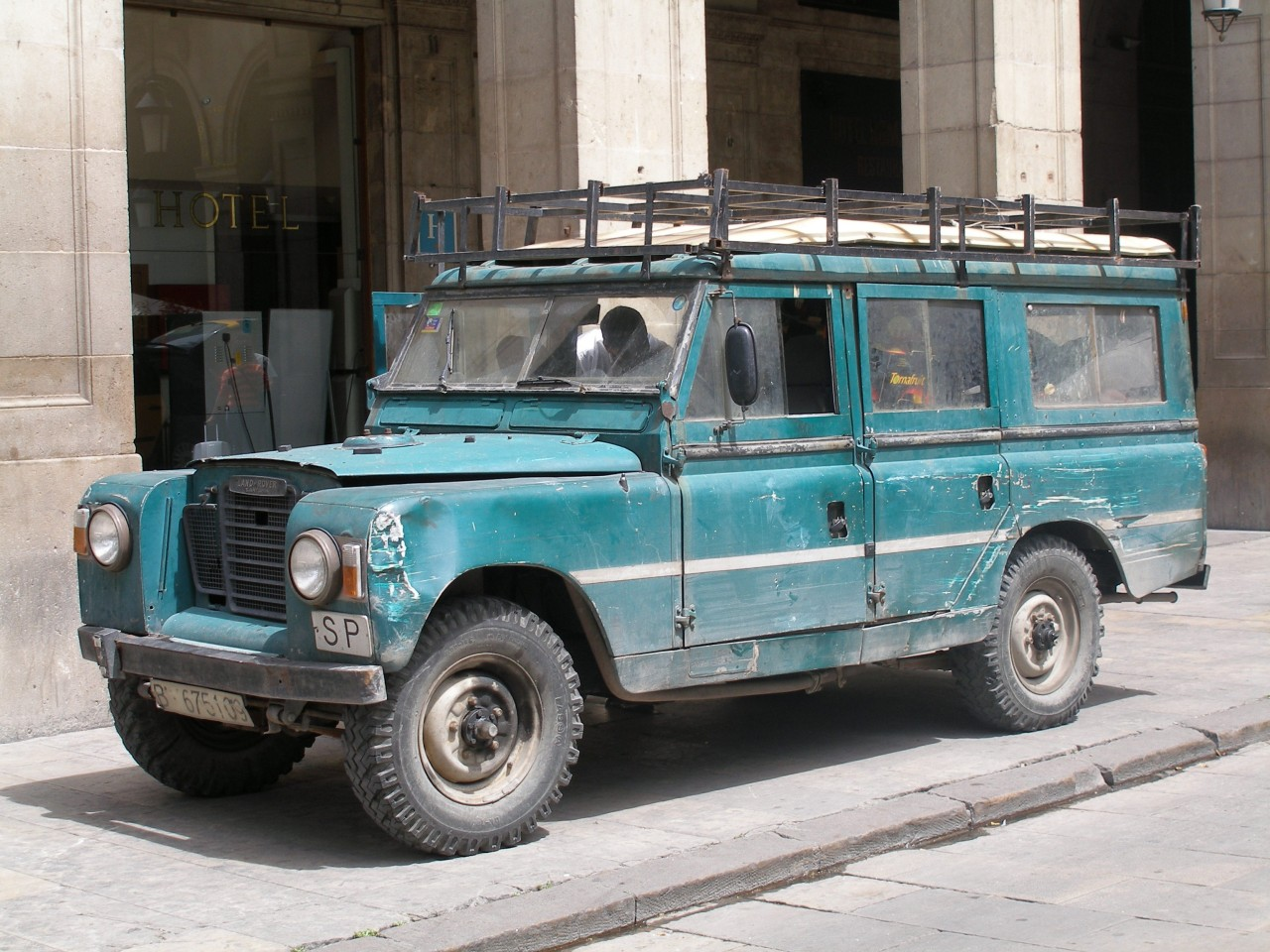
  Santana Series III
- Santana 109: from 1962; long-wheelbase version of the Santana Series IIA, based on the 109-inch Land Rover Series chassis.
- Santana 109 6 cilindros: from 1976; based on the long-wheelbase Santana 109.
- Santana Cazorla: from 1982; based on the six-cylinder Santana 109.
- Santana Super / Turbo: from 1983; based on Santana's evolved Series III platform.
- Santana 2500 aka Santana Series IV: 1984–1994; based on Santana's independently developed Series-derived platform.
- Santana 3500 DL: 1989–1992; based on the long-wheelbase Santana 2500/Santana Series-derived platform, fitted with a six-cylinder 3.5-litre diesel engine.
- Santana PS-10 / Aníbal: 2004–2011; based on the Santana 109/Santana Series-derived platform.

=== Commercial and military derivatives ===
- Commer Santana: 1964–mid-1970s; based on the Commer forward-control van.
- Santana 1300 Forward Control: from 1967; based on the forward-control derivative of the Santana Series IIA platform.
- Santana Militar: from 1969; military derivative based on the short-wheelbase Santana Series platform.
- Santana 2000 Forward Control: from 1979; based on Santana's forward-control commercial-vehicle platform, succeeding the Santana 1300.
- Santana Ligero: from 1980; civilian derivative of the Santana Militar, based on the 88-inch Santana Series platform.

=== Suzuki models assembled by Santana ===
- Suzuki SJ410: 1985–2003; based on the first-generation Suzuki Jimny.
- Suzuki SJ413 / Samurai: 1986–2003; based on the first-generation Suzuki Jimny.
- Suzuki Vitara: 1992–2004; based on the first-generation Suzuki Vitara.
- Suzuki Jimny: 1998–2009; based on the third-generation Suzuki Jimny; the canvas-top version was built by Santana.

=== Santana-branded Suzuki-derived models ===
- Santana 300/350: 2005–2009; based on the first-generation Suzuki Vitara, with the 300 as the three-door version and the 350 as the five-door version.

=== Iveco models assembled by Santana ===
- Iveco Massif: 2007–2011; based on the Santana PS-10/Aníbal platform and restyled by Iveco.
- Iveco Campagnola: 2008–2011; based on the Iveco Massif.
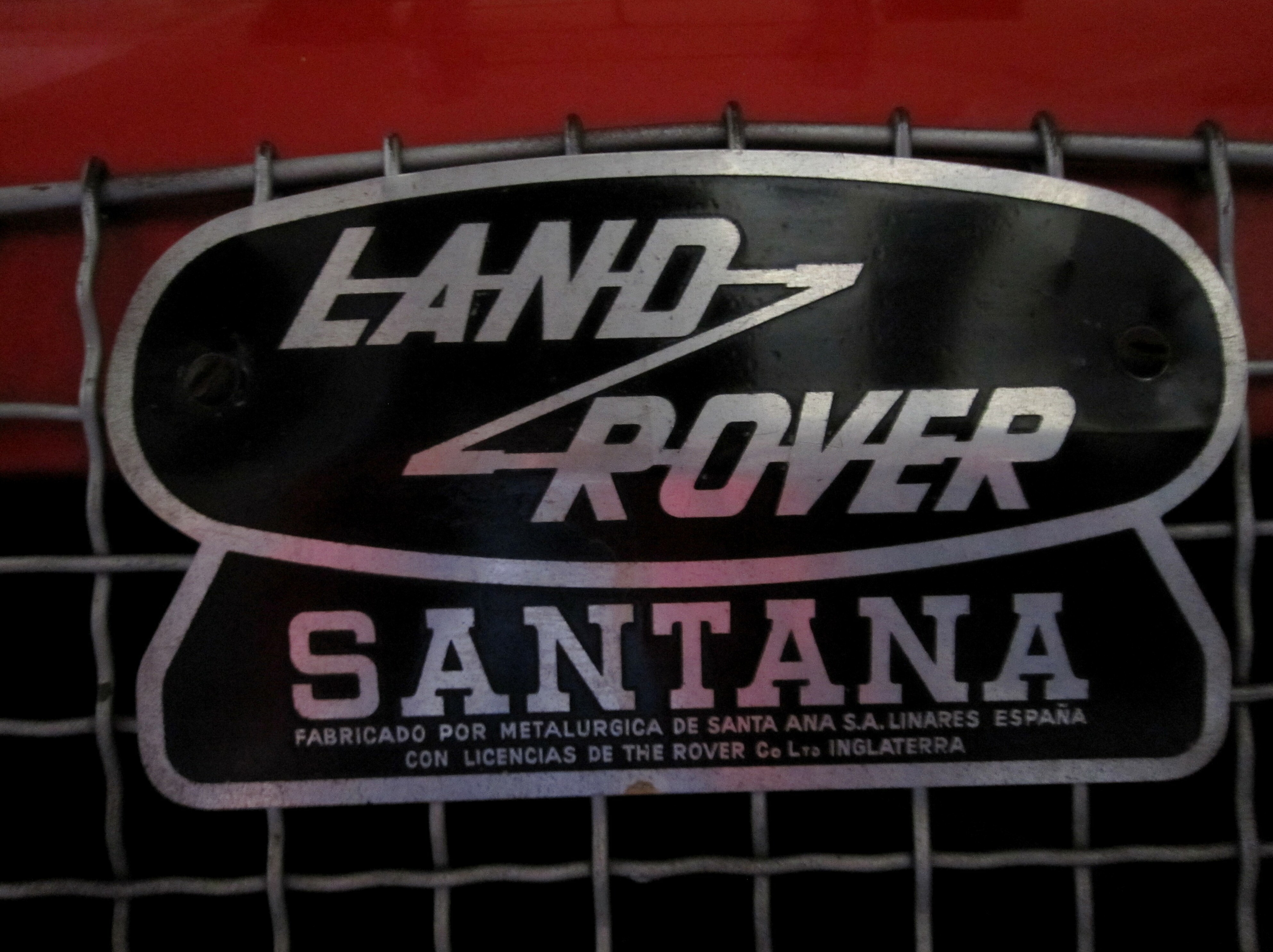
Land Rover Santana Series grille and back badge

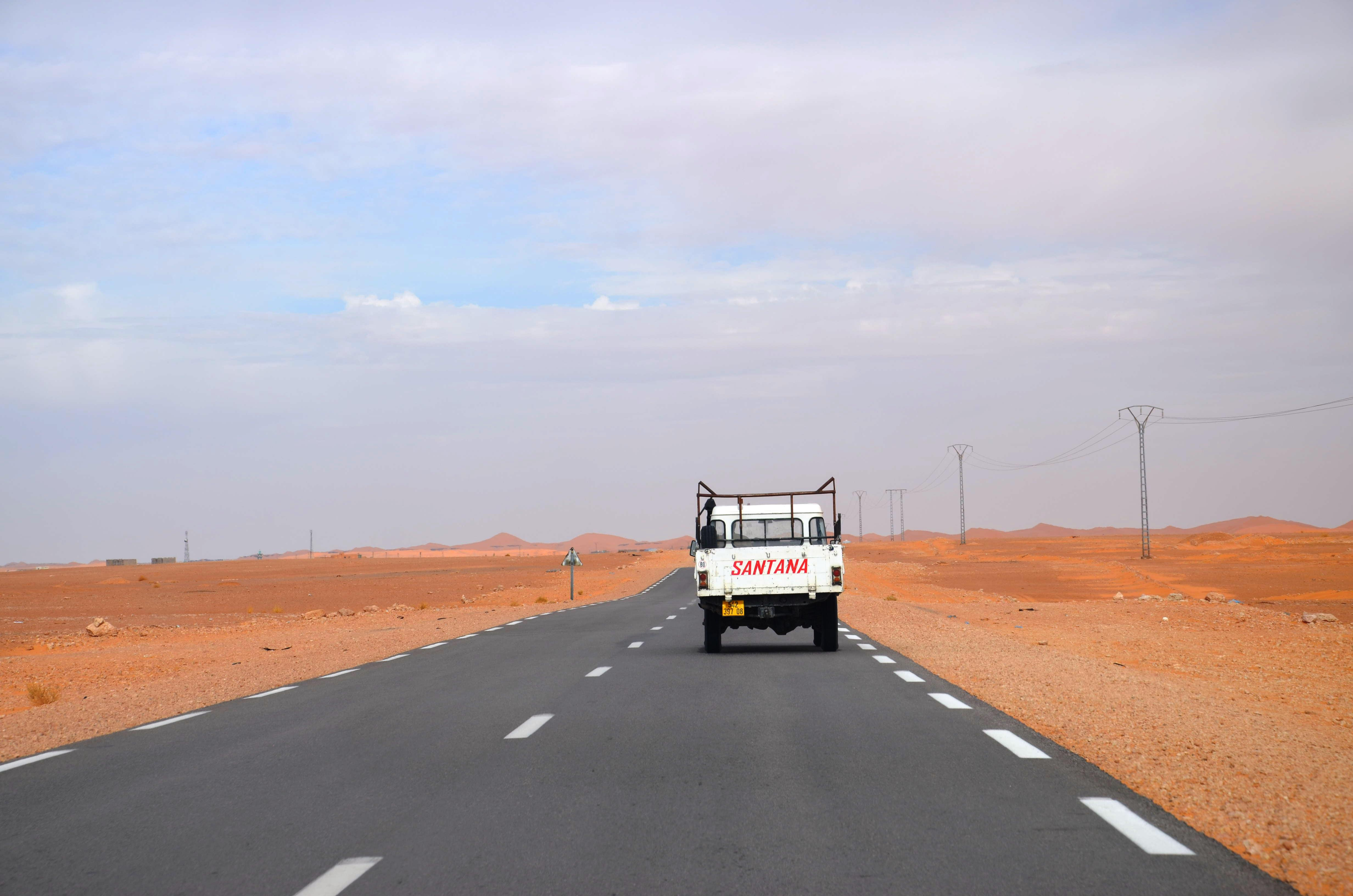
Land Rover Santana 109 'pick-up' in the Algerian Desert

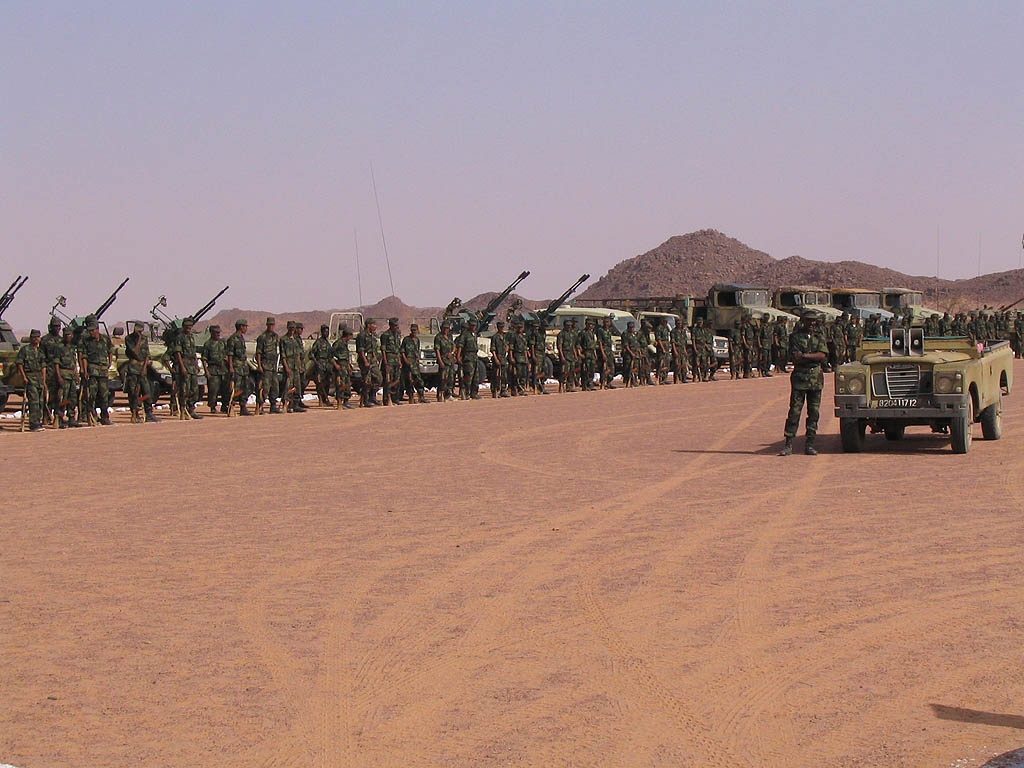
Land Rover Santana Series III of the Spanish Sahara era, used by SPLA troops

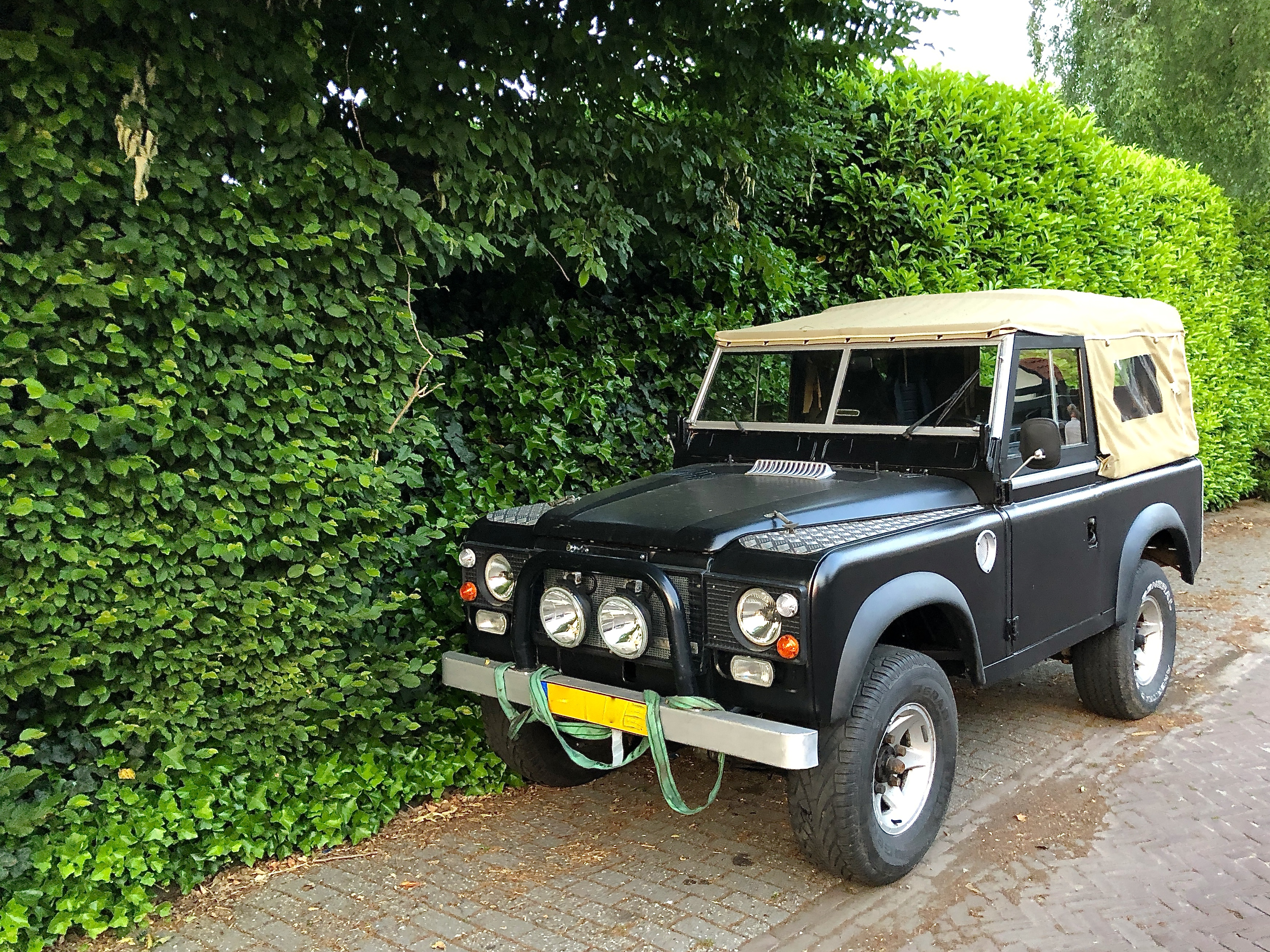
Santana 88 Súper (1983)

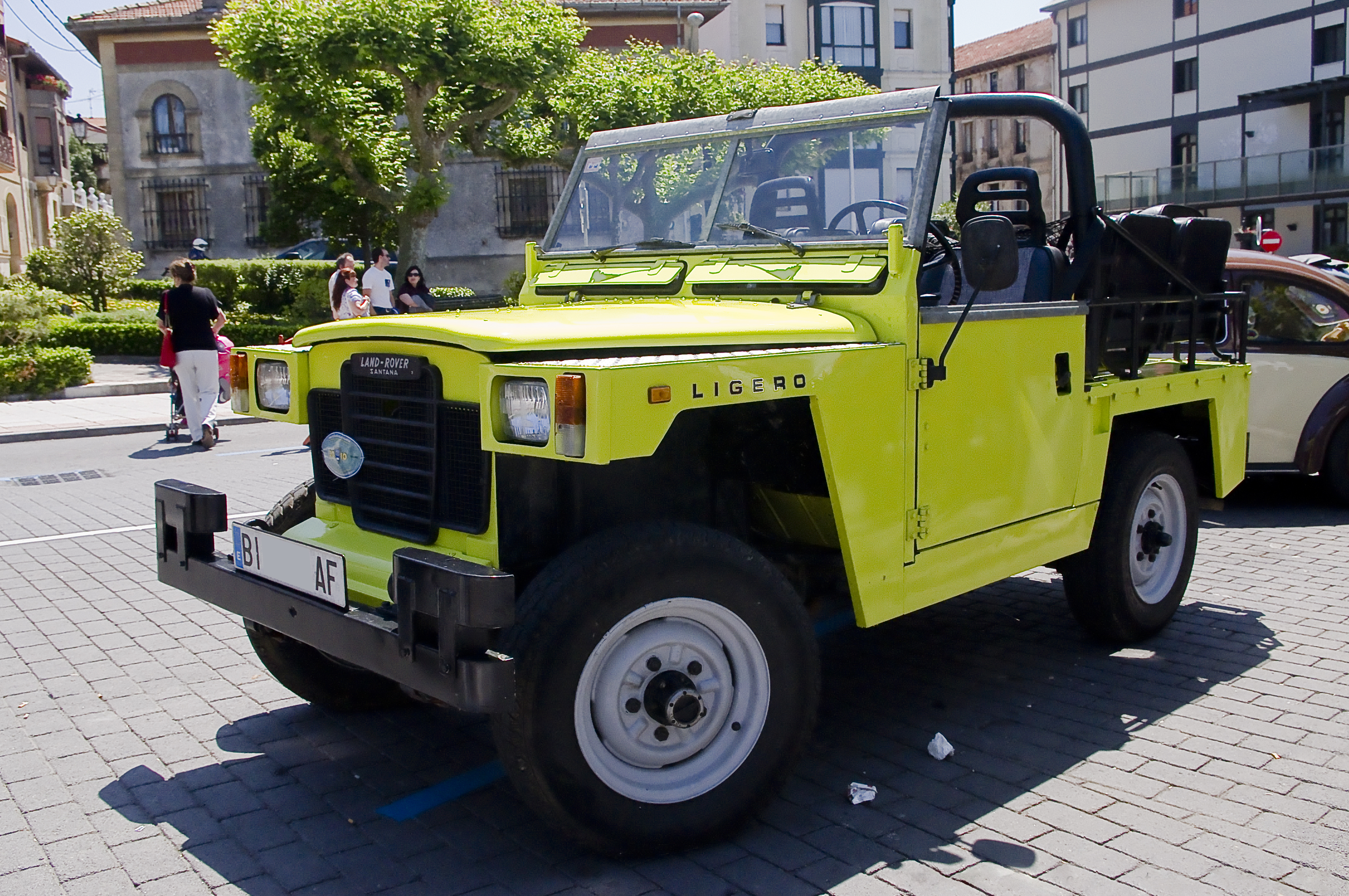
Land Rover Santana 88 Ligero (1983)

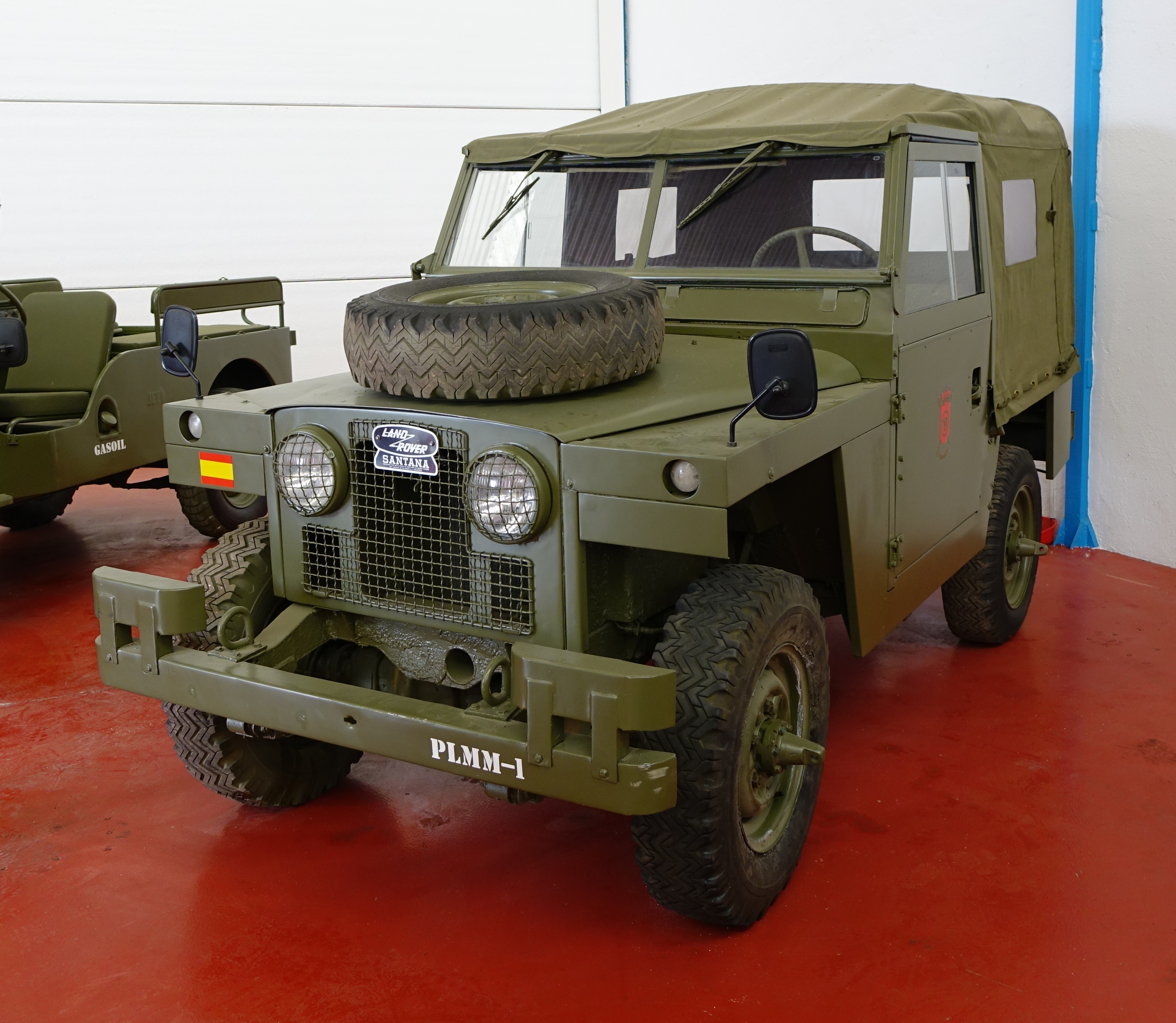
Land Rover Santana 88 Ligero of the Spanish Army (1983)

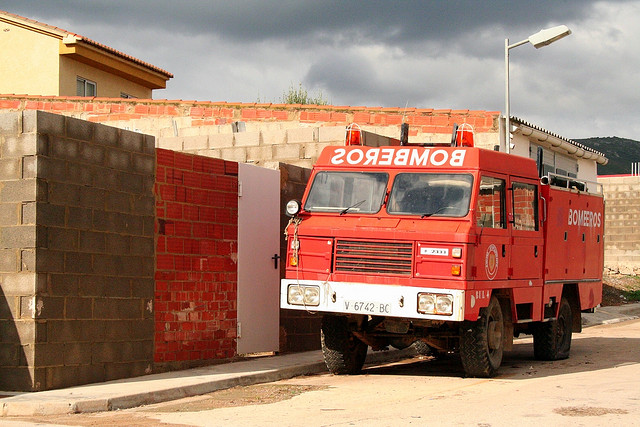
Santana 2000 fire truck with A128 bodywork by FIMESA

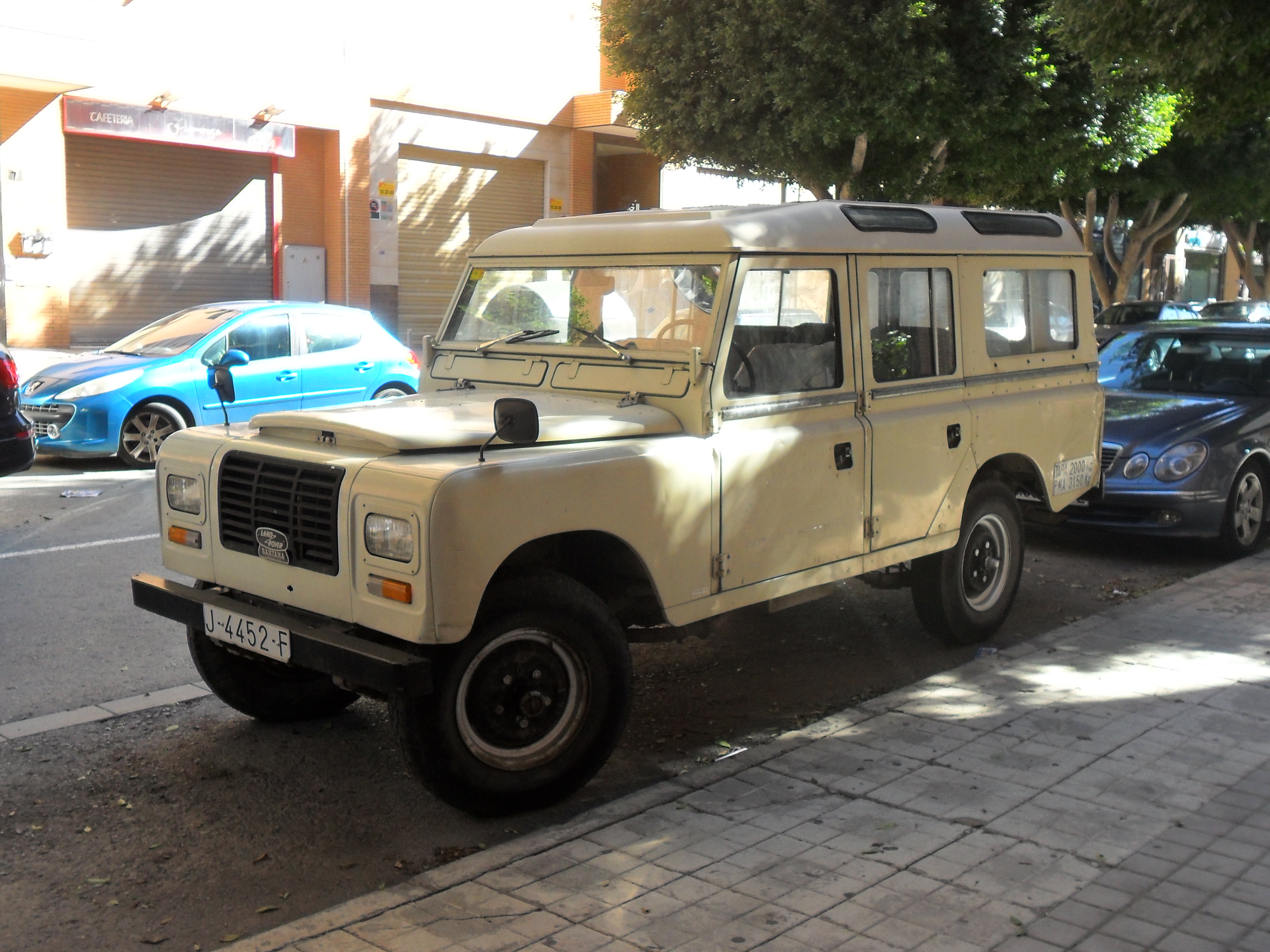
Santana Cazorla

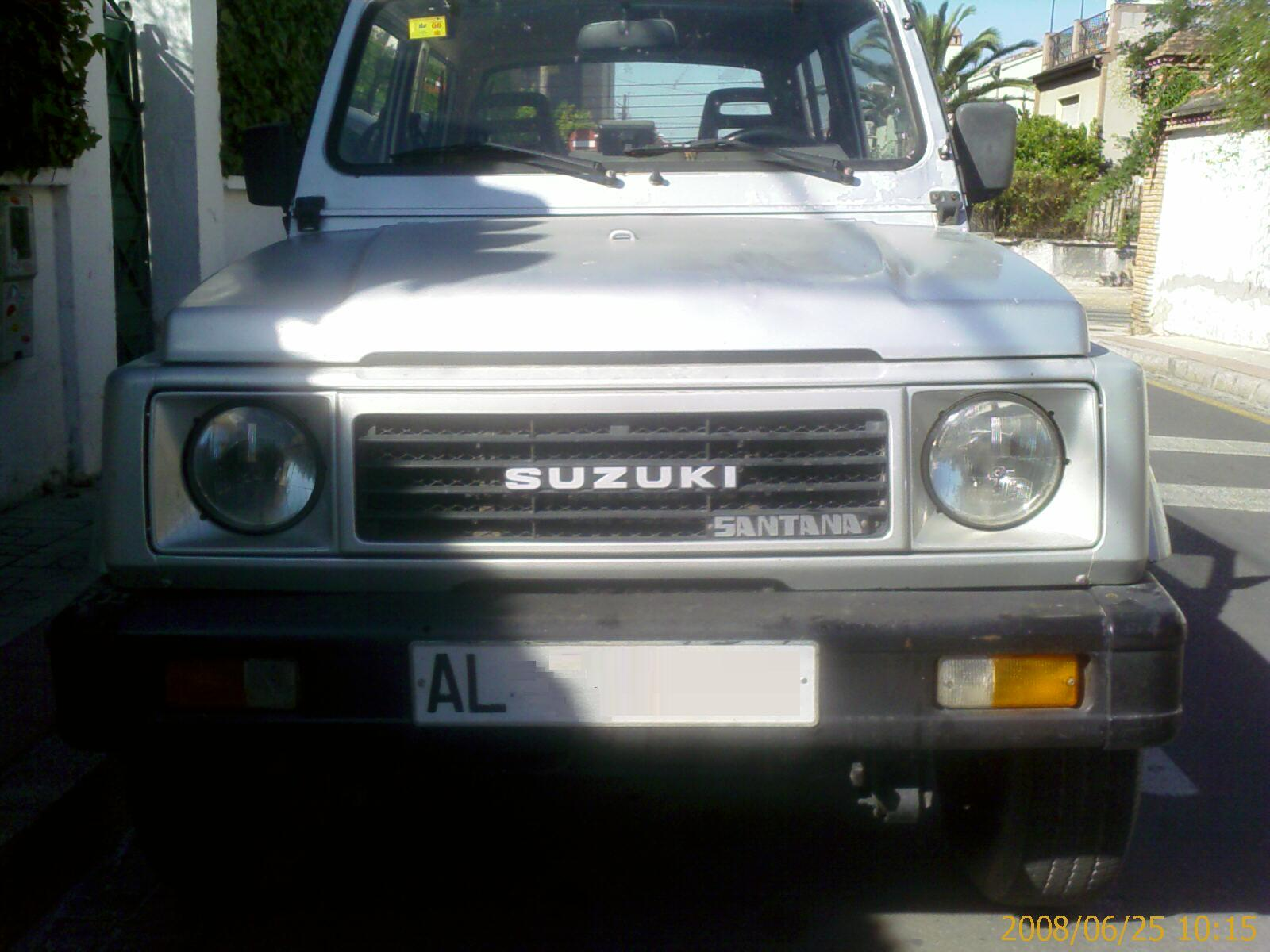
Suzuki SJ 413 made under license by Santana

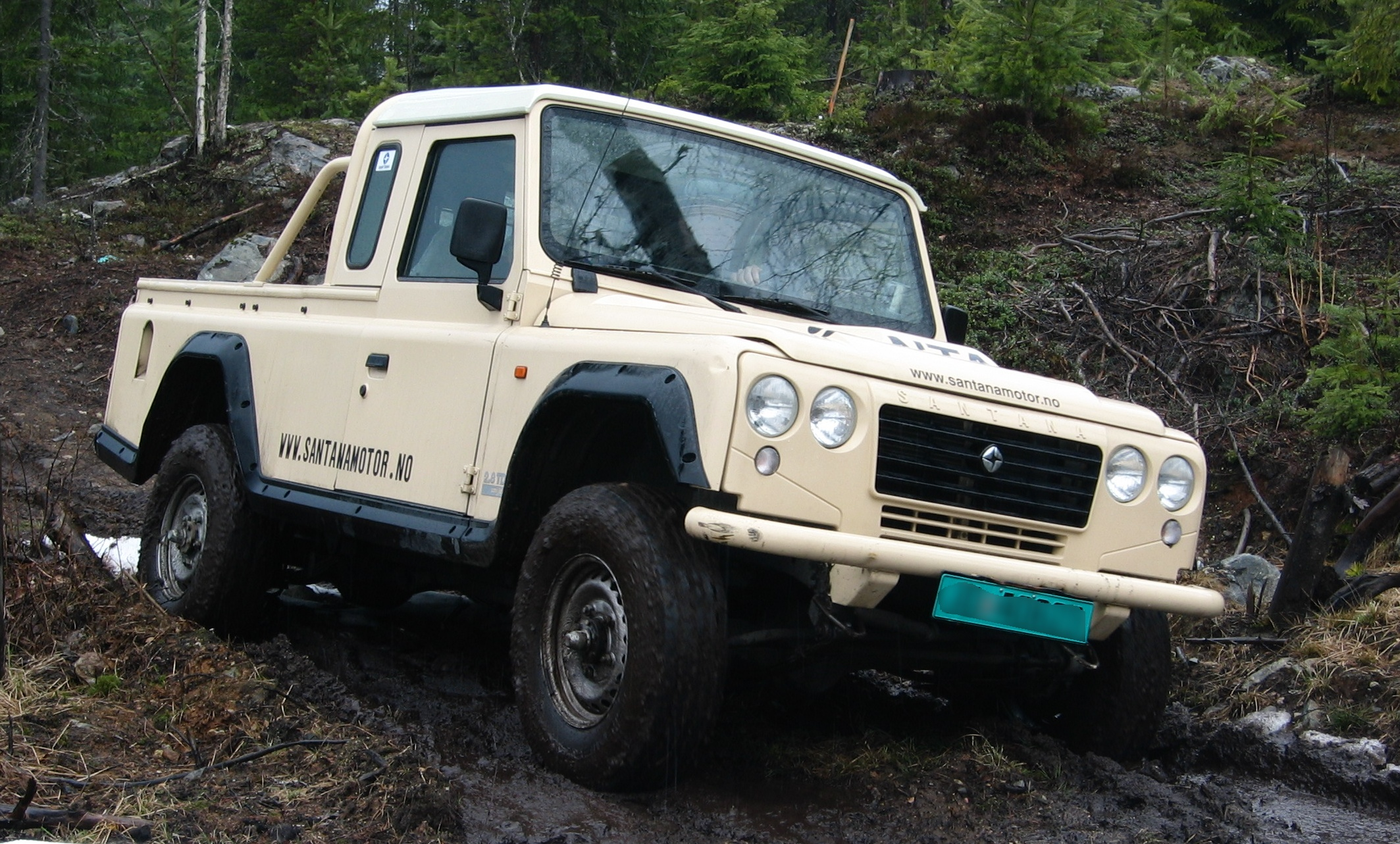
Santana PS-10 pickup

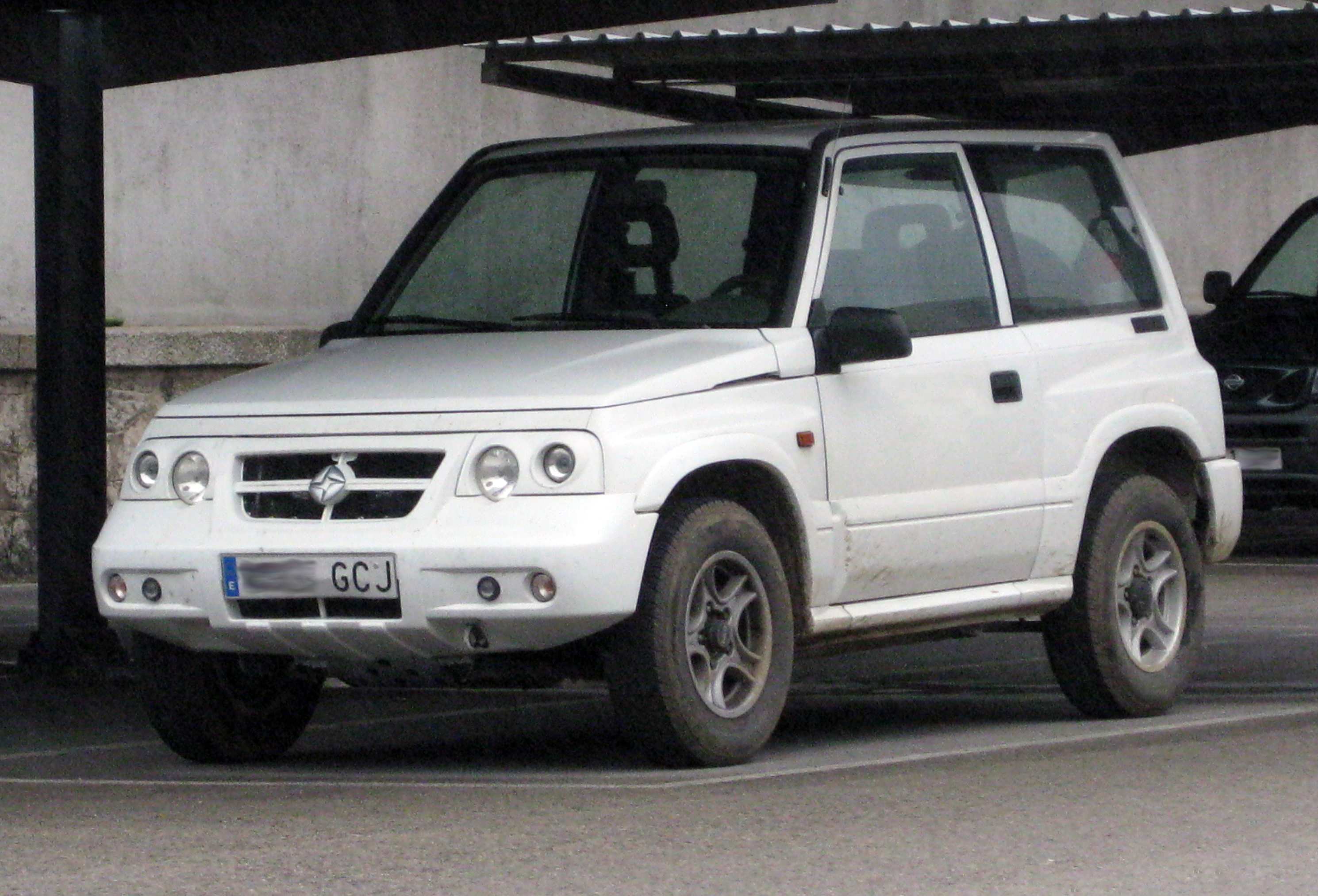
Santana 300
