= Dongfeng Automobile Company =

Chinese light commercial vehicle manufacturer

- Trade name: DFAC
- Company type: Public
- Traded as: SSE: 600006; SSE 380 Component
- ISIN: CNE000000ZT3
- Industry: Automobile
- Founded: 21 July 1999; 26 years ago
- Founder: Dongfeng Motor Corporation
- Headquarters: Xiangyang, Hubei, China
- Products: Light commercial vehicle
- Production output: ▲201,449 units (2017)
- Revenue: ▲CN¥18.301 billion (2017)
- Net income: ▼CN¥201 million (2017)
- Total assets: ▼CN¥17.788 billion (2017)
- Total equity: ▲CN¥6.700 billion (2017)
- Owner: Dongfeng Motor Co., Ltd. (60.1%)
- Number of employees: 6,624 (2017)
- Parent: Dongfeng Motor Co., Ltd.

Chinese name
- Simplified Chinese: 东风汽车股份有限公司
- Traditional Chinese: 東風汽車股份有限公司
- Literal meaning: Dongfeng Motor Joint-stock Limited Corporation
Transcriptions
Standard Mandarin
- Hanyu Pinyin: Dōngfēng Qìchē Gǔfèn Yǒuxiàn Gōngsī

Chinese short name
- Simplified Chinese: 东风汽车
- Traditional Chinese: 東風汽車
- Literal meaning: Dongfeng Motor
Transcriptions
Standard Mandarin
- Hanyu Pinyin: Dōngfēng Qìchē

Second alternative name
- Simplified Chinese: 东风股份
- Traditional Chinese: 東風股份
- Literal meaning: Dongfeng Joint-stock
Transcriptions
Standard Mandarin
- Hanyu Pinyin: Dōngfēng Gǔfèn
- Website: www.dfac.com
- Footnotes / references in consolidated financial statement; figure included discontinued subsidiary Zhengzhou Nissan

Dongfeng Automobile Co., Ltd. (abb. DFAC) is a Chinese automobile company based in Xiangyang, Hubei. It is a subsidiary of Dongfeng Motor Co., Ltd. (DFL) which is a joint venture of Dongfeng Motor Group (DFG) and Nissan. DFG is majority owned by Dongfeng Motor Corporation, a Chinese state-owned enterprise.

It makes light commercial vehicles for the Chinese market. It also makes diesel engines in a 50-50 joint venture with Cummins, Inc. known as Dongfeng Cummins Engine Co. Ltd.

As of May 2018, DFAC is a constituent of small cap index SSE 380 Index.

== History ==
The predecessors of Dongfeng Automobile Company, were a light commercial vehicles factory, an engine factory and a foundry (Note: known as 东风汽车公司铸造三厂, literally The third foundry of Dongfeng Motor) of Dongfeng Motor Corporation, (Note: Now known as 东风汽车集团有限公司, was known as 东风汽车公司 and previously 第二汽车制造厂.) that were located in Xiangyang, Hubei province. Founded in Shiyan in 1969, the ultimate parent company Dongfeng Motor Corporation was headquartered in Wuhan, the provincial capital of Hubei since 2003. However, the headquarter of Dongfeng Automobile Company was remained at Xiangyang.

The first factory of Dongfeng Motor in Xiangyang was first built in 1983.

Dongfeng Automobile Company Limited (Chinese: 东风汽车股份有限公司; abb. DFAC) was incorporated as a subsidiary (70% shares) of Dongfeng Motor Corporation on 21 July 1999, the date of receiving the license of incorporation, or 15 July, the date of the first annual general meeting. In the same year the rest of the shares were floated on the Shanghai Stock Exchange. The company also signed a leasing agreement with Dongfeng Motor Corporation, regarding the land lease and trademarks.

In 2001, the shares held by Dongfeng Motor Corporation were transferred to an intermediate parent company Dongfeng Motor Group (Chinese: 东风汽车集团股份有限公司; known as Dongfeng Motor Co., Ltd. (Chinese: 东风汽车有限公司) at that time), as part of a debt restructuring. In 2003, the shares were transferred again, to a Sino-Japanese joint venture [new] Dongfeng Motor Co., Ltd. (Chinese: 东风汽车有限公司).

In 2010, it was reported that the company started to build its electric bus assembly line.

== Subsidiaries ==
current

former

DFAC acquired 51% stake of Zhengzhou Nissan Automobile (Chinese: 郑州日产汽车有限公司) in 2005 for CN¥352 million from two other state-owned companies: CITIC Automobile (of CITIC Group) and Zhengzhou Light Vehicle Works (Chinese: 郑州轻型汽车制造厂). DFAC also subscribed a capital increase of Zhengzhou Nissan, for CN¥530 million in 2008. On 13 June 2017, DFAC announced to sell Zhengzhou Nissan to the direct parent company Dongfeng Motor Co., Ltd. for about CN¥788 million, subject to the approval of extraordinary general meeting. It was approved on 28 June.

== Joint ventures ==
Dongfeng Cummins Engine Co., Ltd. (Chinese: 东风康明斯发动机有限公司; abb. DCEC), a joint venture of Cummins and Dongfeng in Xiangyang (formerly called Xiangfan), was established in 1995. It manufactured heavy duty vehicle engines.

== Shareholders ==
As of 31 December 2017

DFAC was majority owned by a joint venture Dongfeng Motor Co., Ltd., making DFAC was indirectly owned by the Chinese Government (via Dongfeng Motor Corporation), the French State (via Renault), H share shareholders of Dongfeng Motor Group and other shareholders of Nissan and Renault (via Nissan).

The Chinese Government also owned an additional 2.74% shares via their sovereign wealth fund Central Huijin as the second largest shareholder of Dongfeng Automobile Company.

== Products ==
=== DFAC ===
The light commercial vehicle products of Dongfeng Automobile Company are sold under the DFAC brand.

- Dongfeng DFAC Xiaobawang V
- Dongfeng DFAC Xiaobawang W (Suzuki Carry based, later rebranded as Tuyi T3)/ Xiaobawang W08/ Xiaobawang
- Dongfeng DFAC Xiaobawang W15
- Dongfeng DFAC Xiaobawang W17
- Dongfeng DFAC Xiaobawang W18
- Dongfeng DFAC Duolika D5/ D6/ D7/ D8 (Nissan Cabstar based)
- Dongfeng DFAC Duolika D9/ D9K/ D12
- Dongfeng DFAC Furuika F5/ F6/ F7
- Dongfeng DFAC Furuika R5/ R6/ R7/ R8
- Dongfeng DFAC Furuika Fuxiaorui
- Dongfeng DFAC Lituo T5/ T10/ T15/ T20/ T25
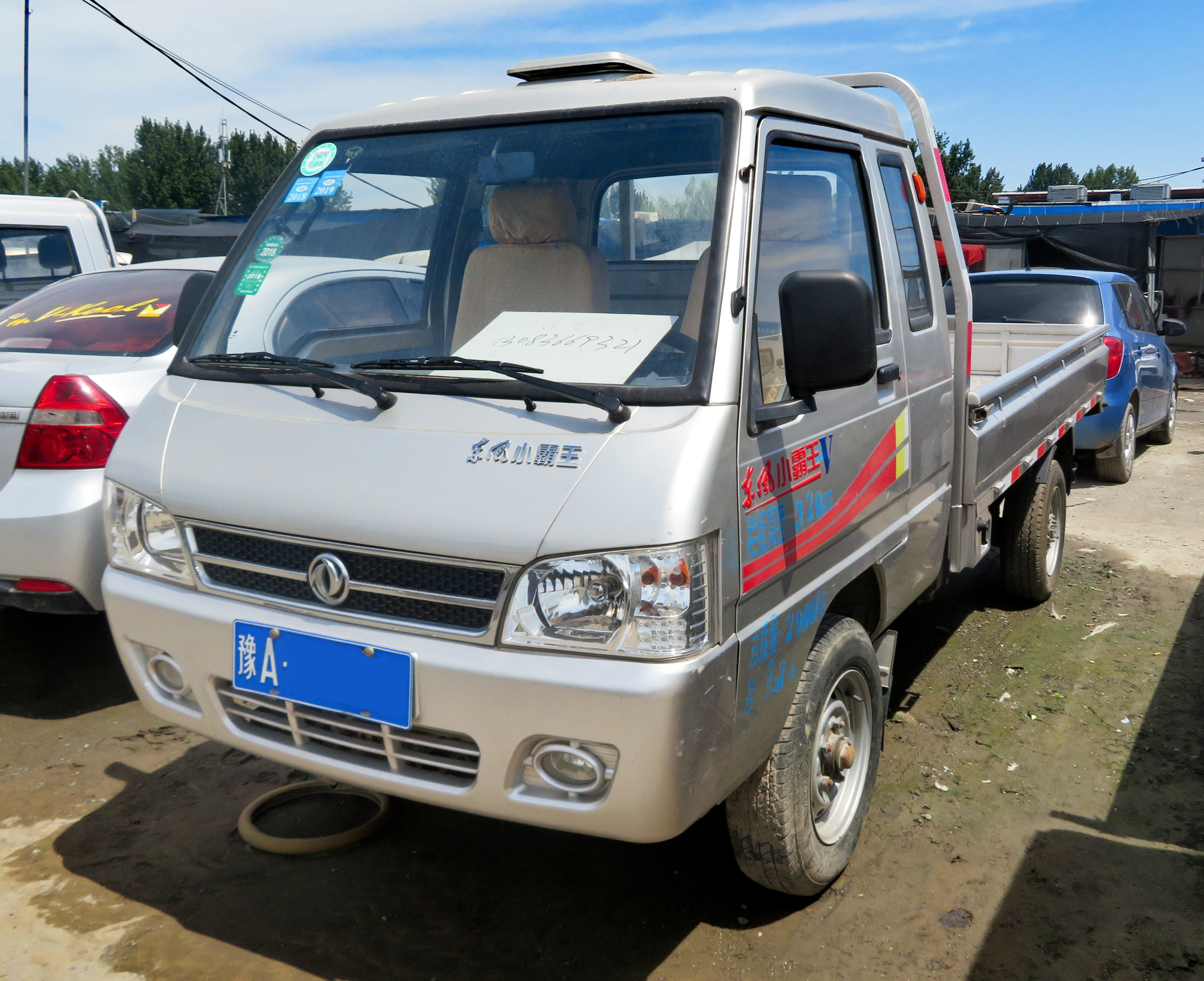
Dongfeng Xiaobawang V

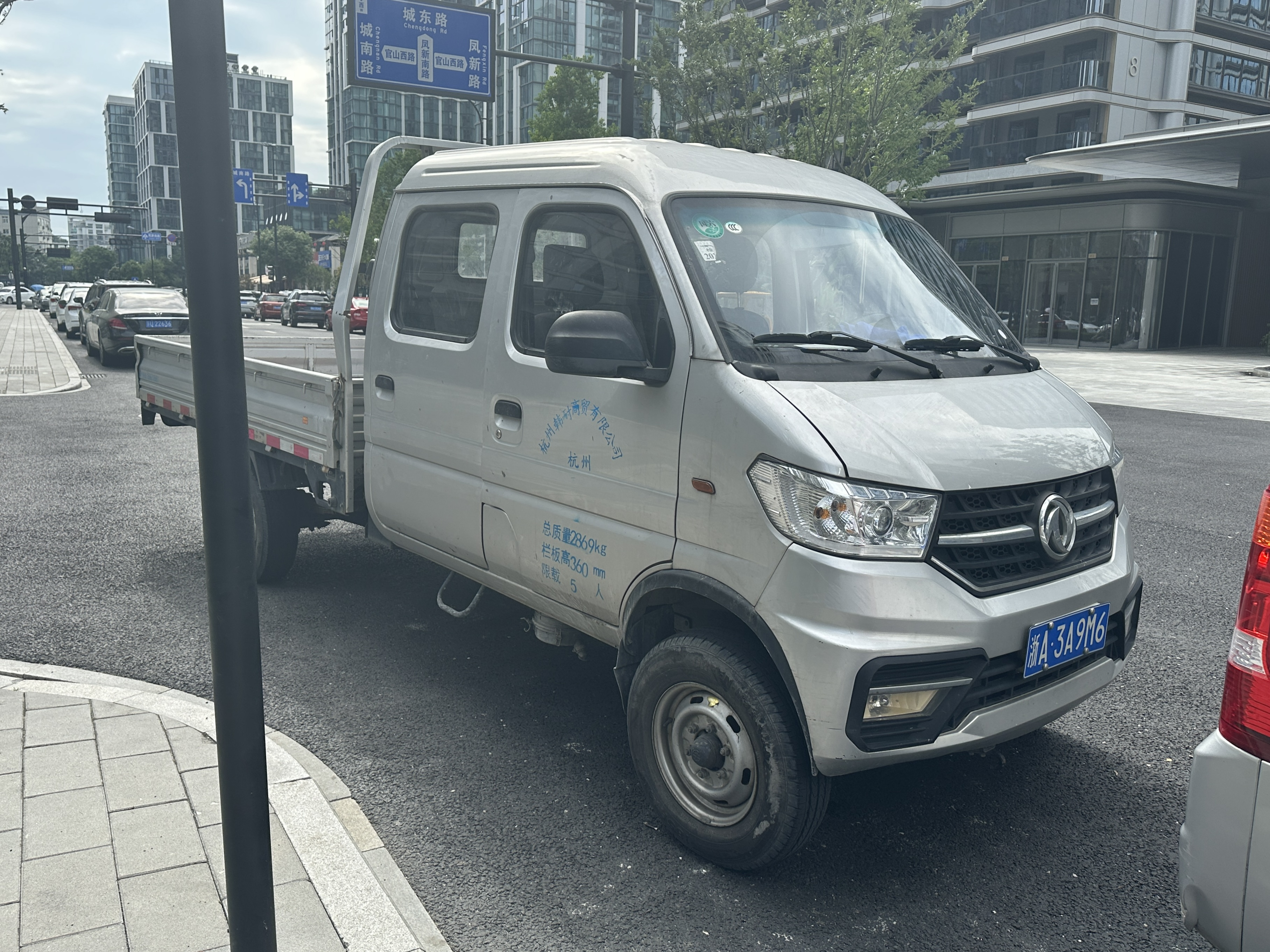
Dongfeng Xiaobawang W08

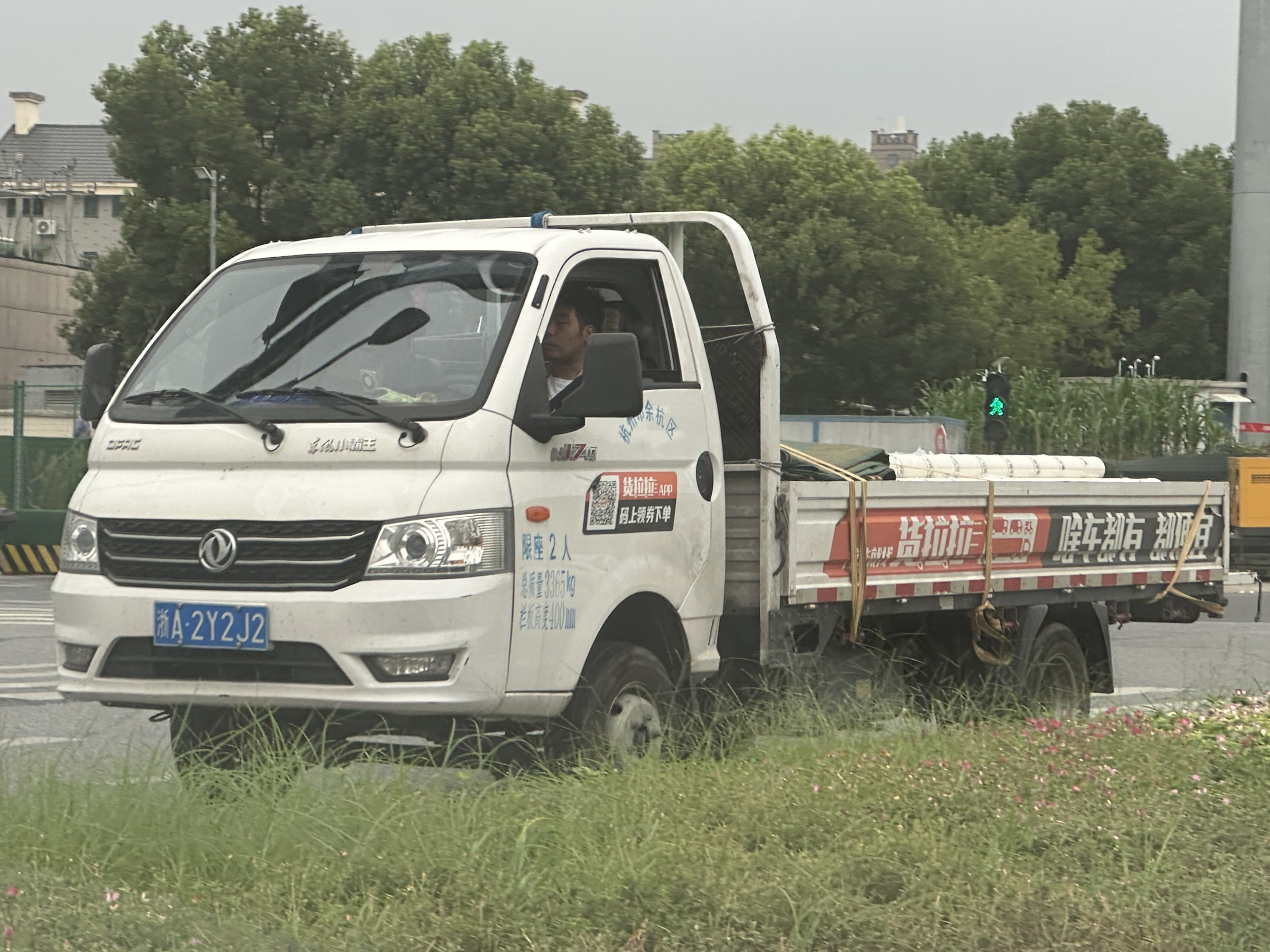
Dongfeng Xiaobawang W17

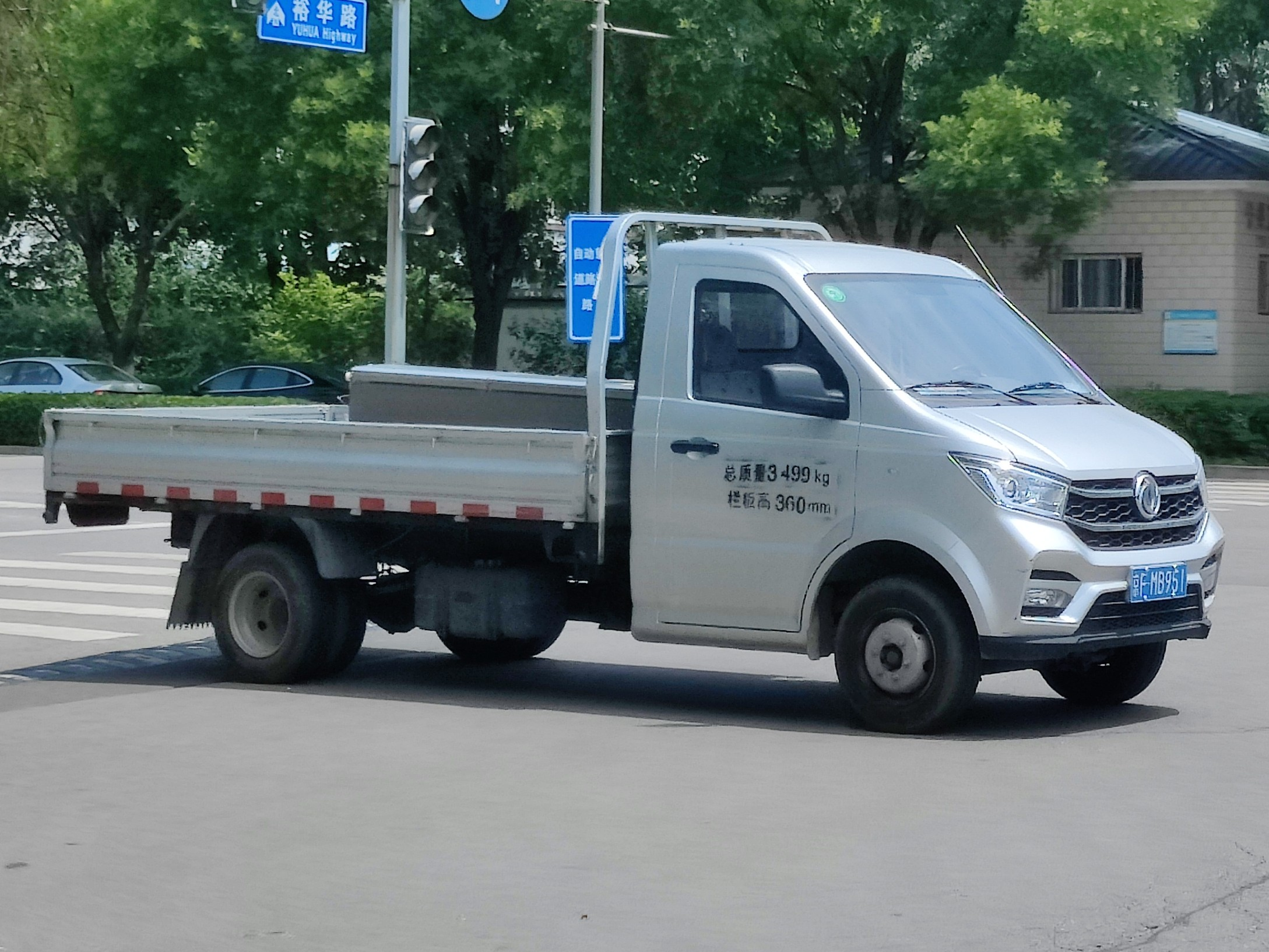
Dongfeng Xiaobawang W18

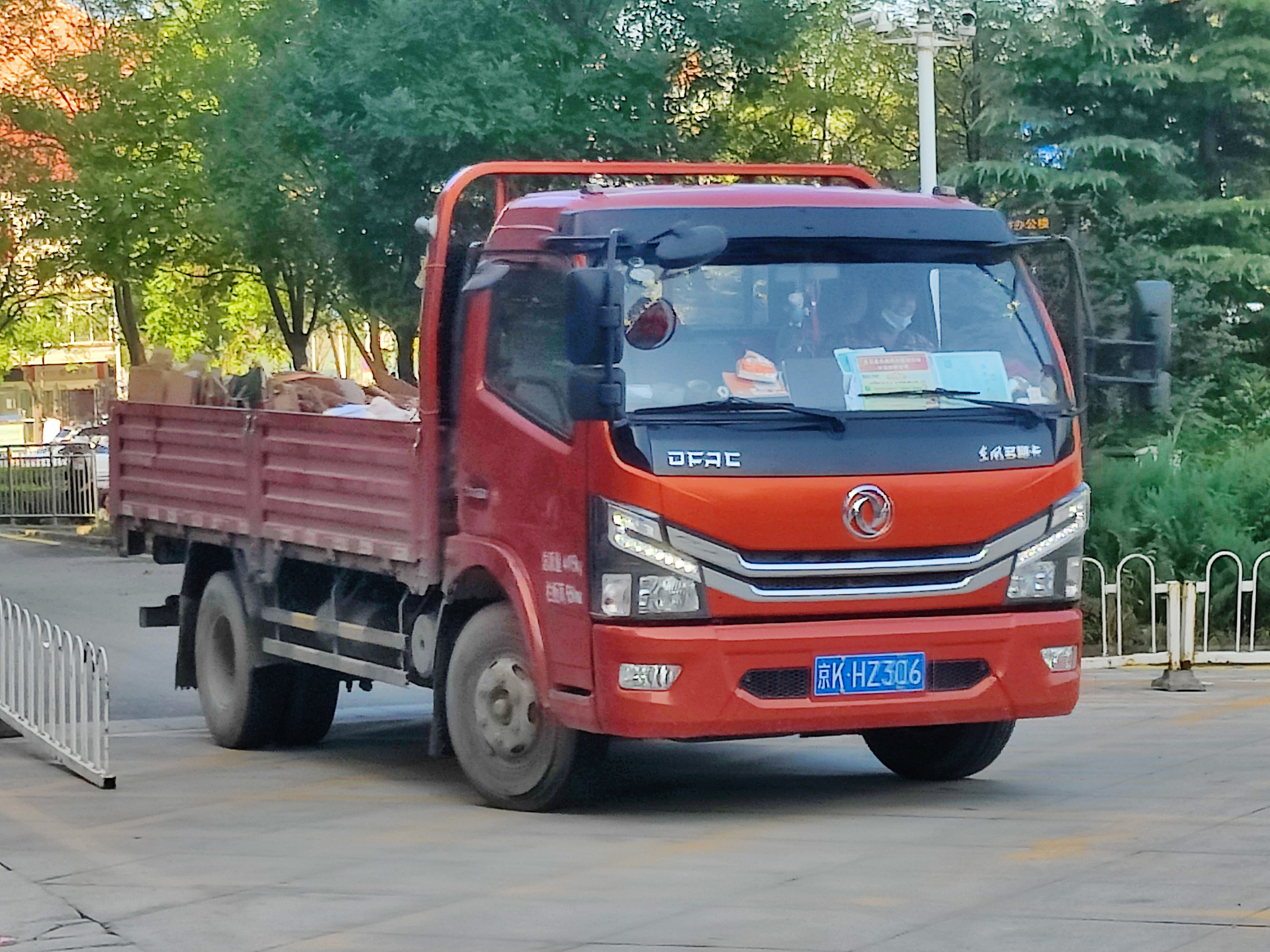
Dongfeng Duolika D5 II

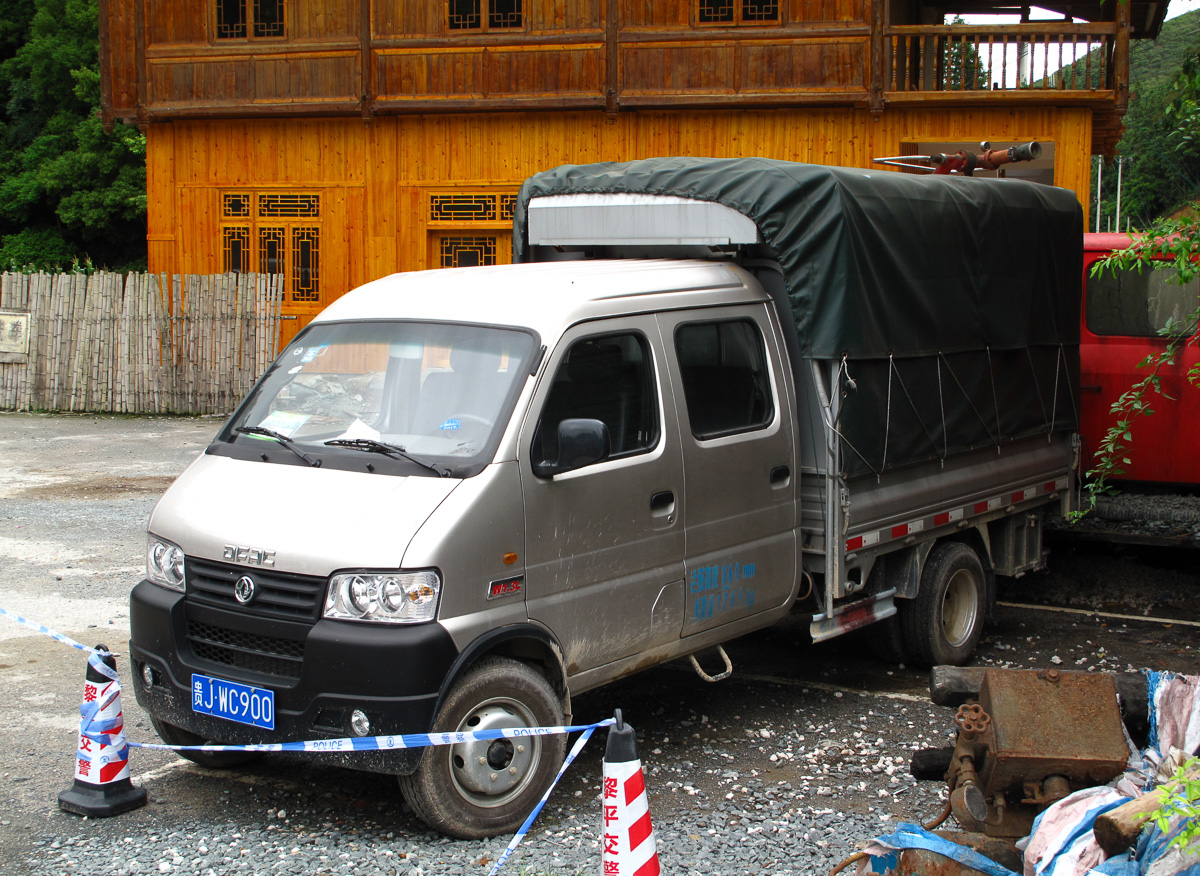
Dongfeng Xiaobawang W

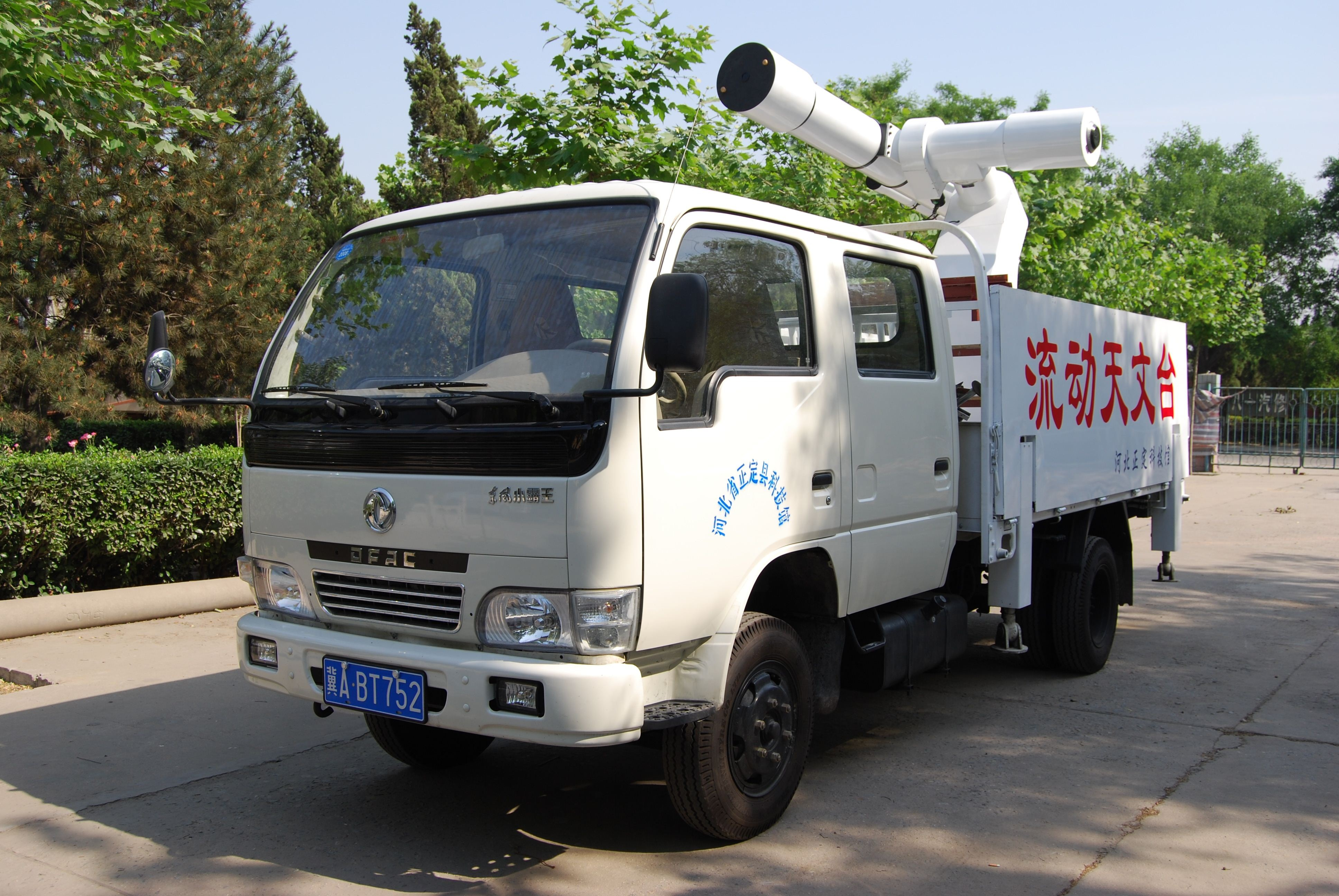
Dongfeng Xiaobawang

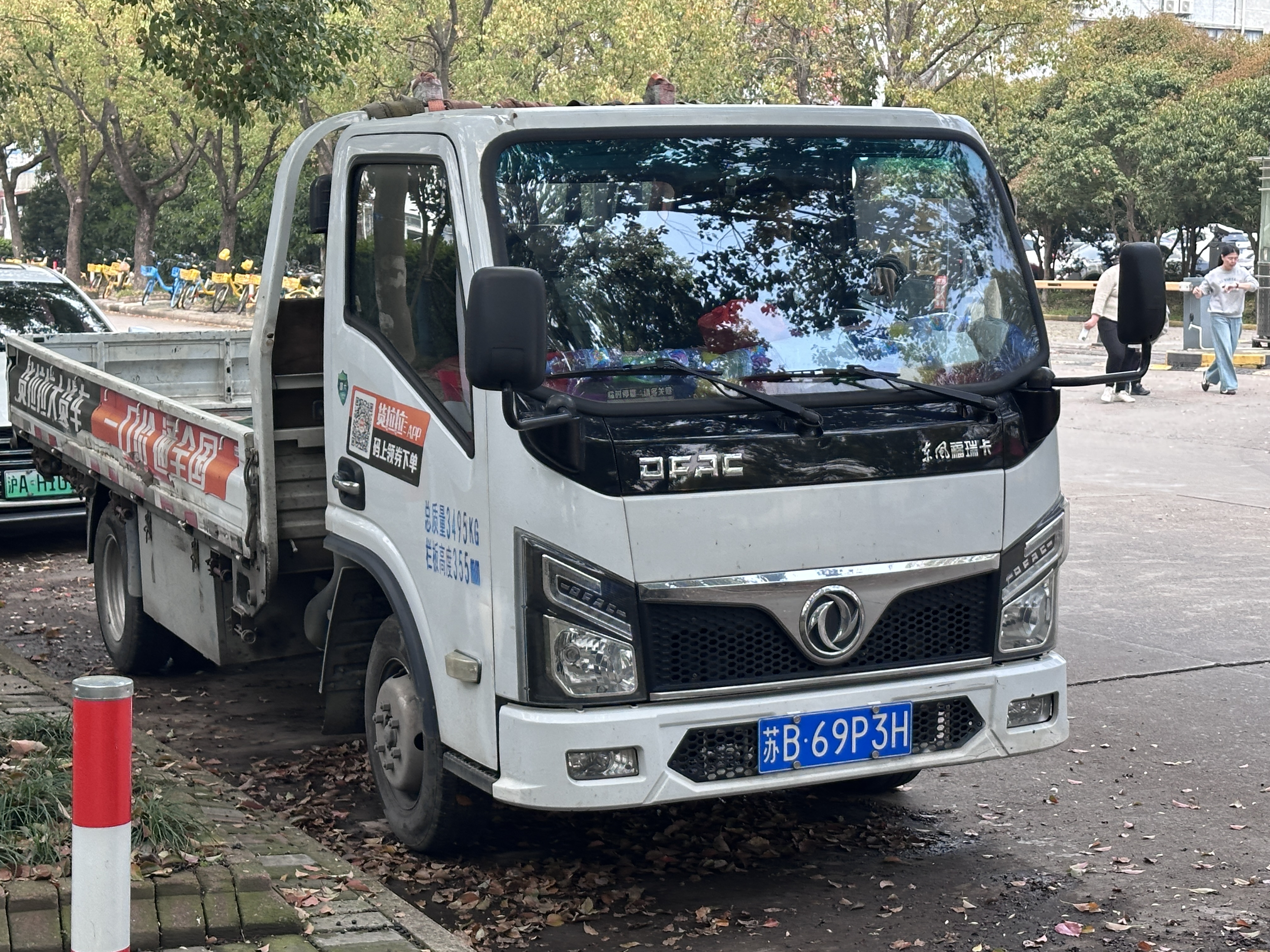
Dongfeng Furuika Fuxiaorui

=== DFAC electric trucks (Captain) ===
The electric light commercial vehicle products of Dongfeng Automobile Company are Dongfeng Electric Light Trucks sold under the DFAC or Captain (凯普特) brand.

- Dongfeng DFAC Captain (Kaipute) K5/ K6/ K6-N/ K7/ K8
- Dongfeng EV200
- Dongfeng EV300
- Dongfeng EV350
- Dongfeng EV400
- Dongfeng EV450
- Dongfeng EV500
- Dongfeng E-Star

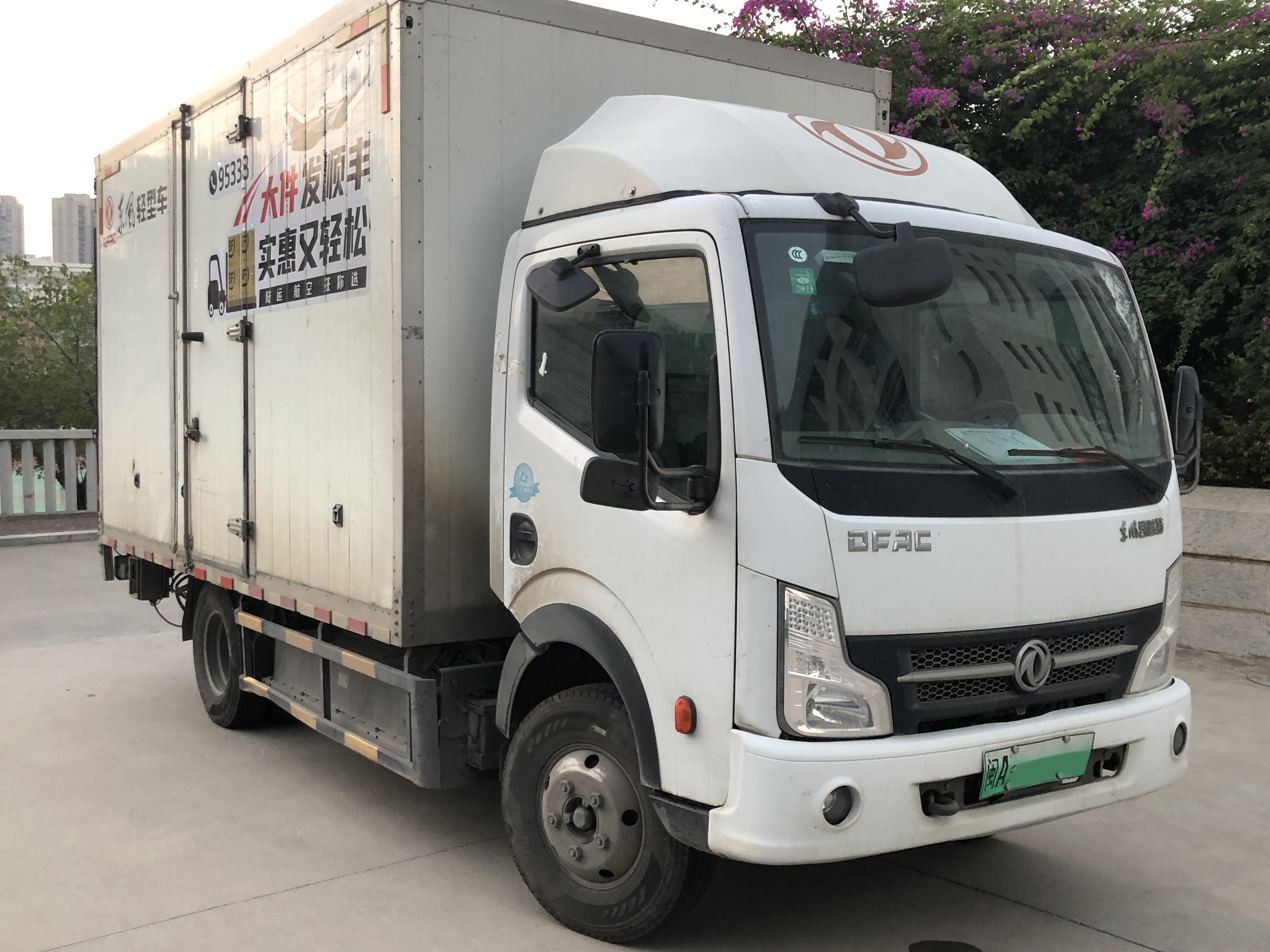
Dongfeng Captain (Kaipute) EV350

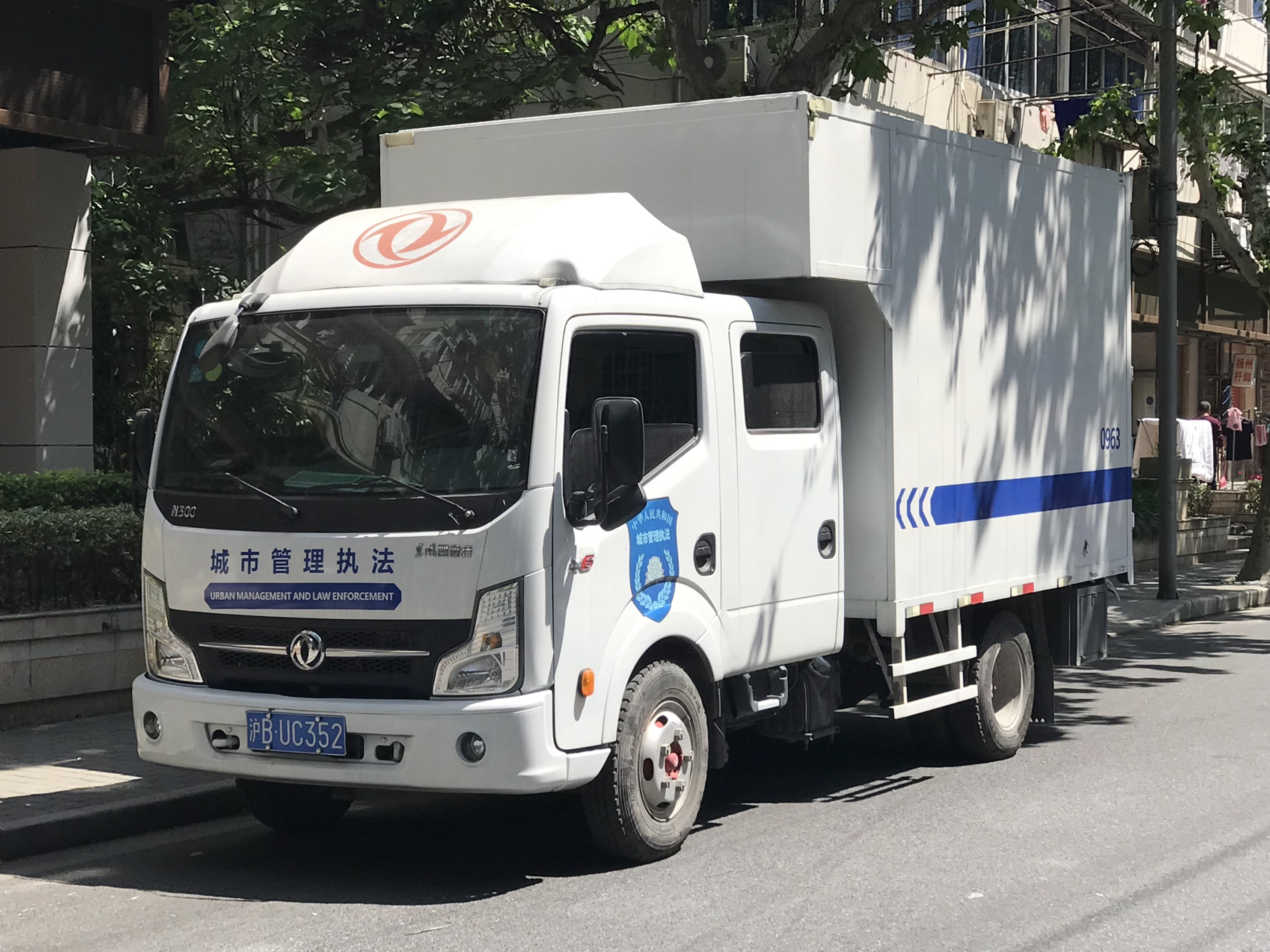
Dongfeng Captain (Kaipute) K6-N (N300)

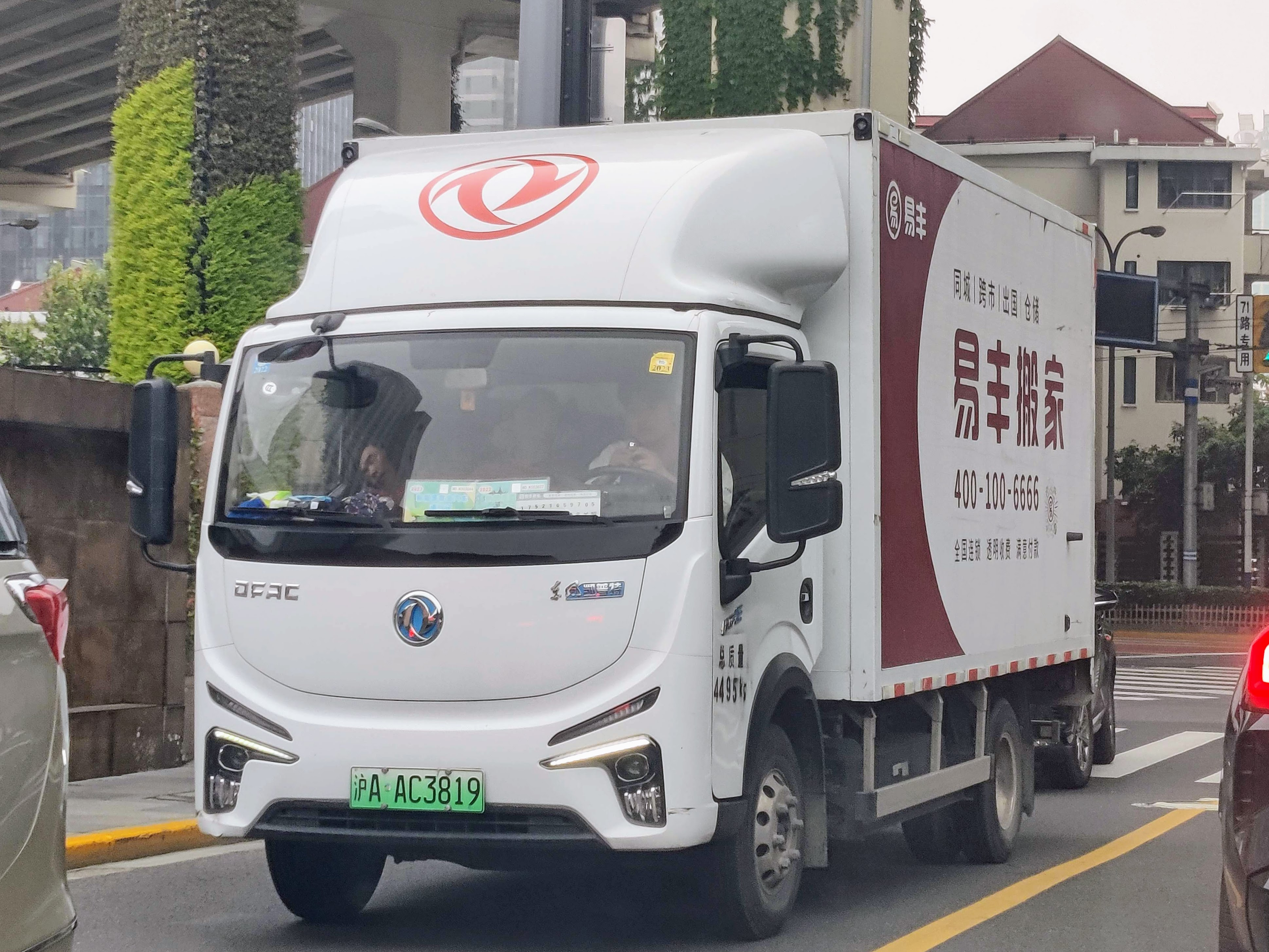
Dongfeng Captain (Kaipute) E-Star

=== Yufeng series and Ruilida V series ===
The electric commercial vans of Dongfeng Automobile Company are mainly developed for the logistics industry and are mainly rebadged variants of gasoline-powered vans sold under the Yufeng series. The Dongfeng Yufeng was originally a full size van, which later spawned an electric variant called the Yufeng EM19 which became the start of the Yufeng series.

- Dongfeng Yufeng EA100
- Dongfeng Yufeng EM19
- Dongfeng Yufeng EM26
- DFAC Ruilida (睿立达) V series V5/ V7/ V8E
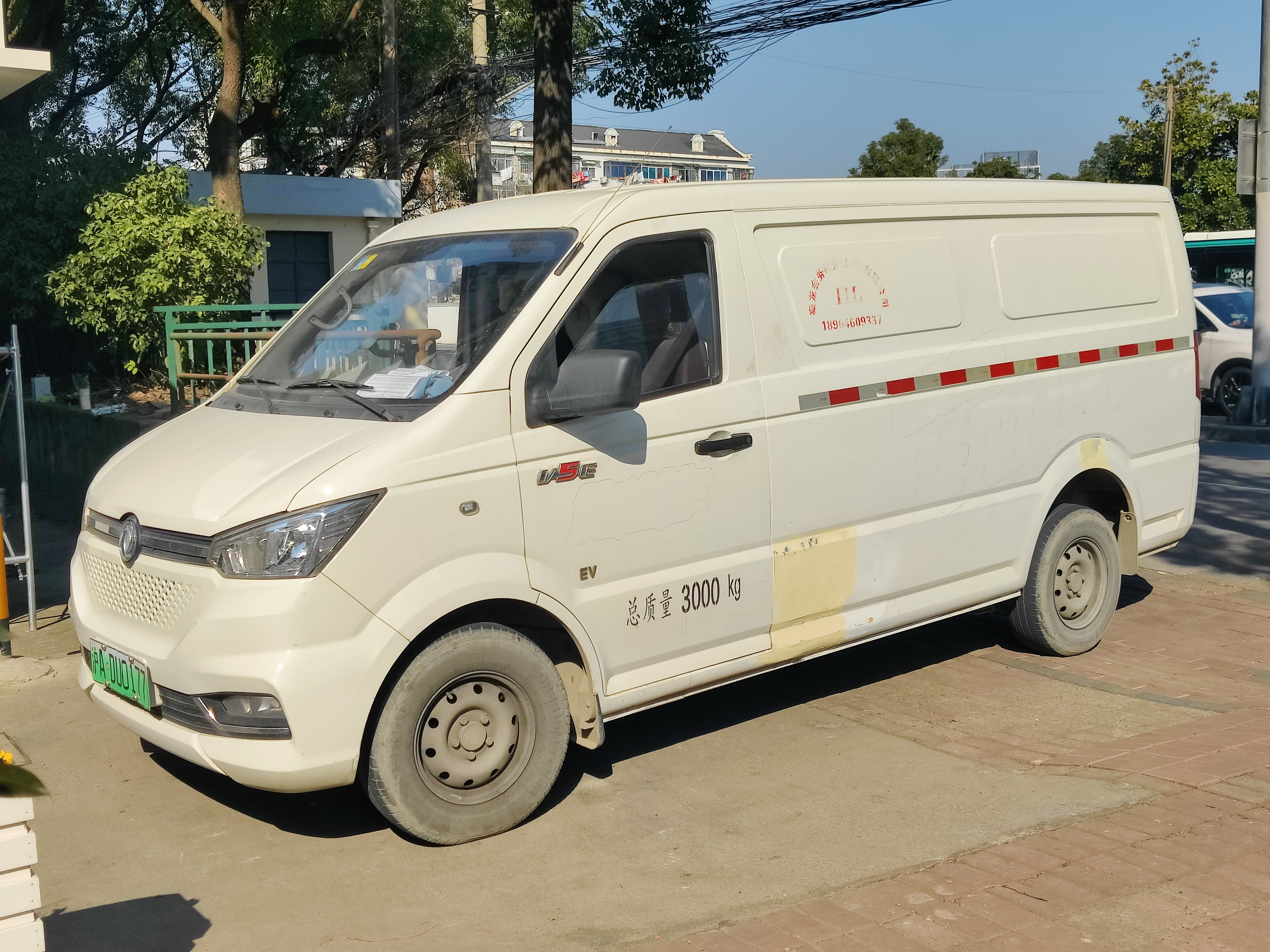
Yufeng EM26

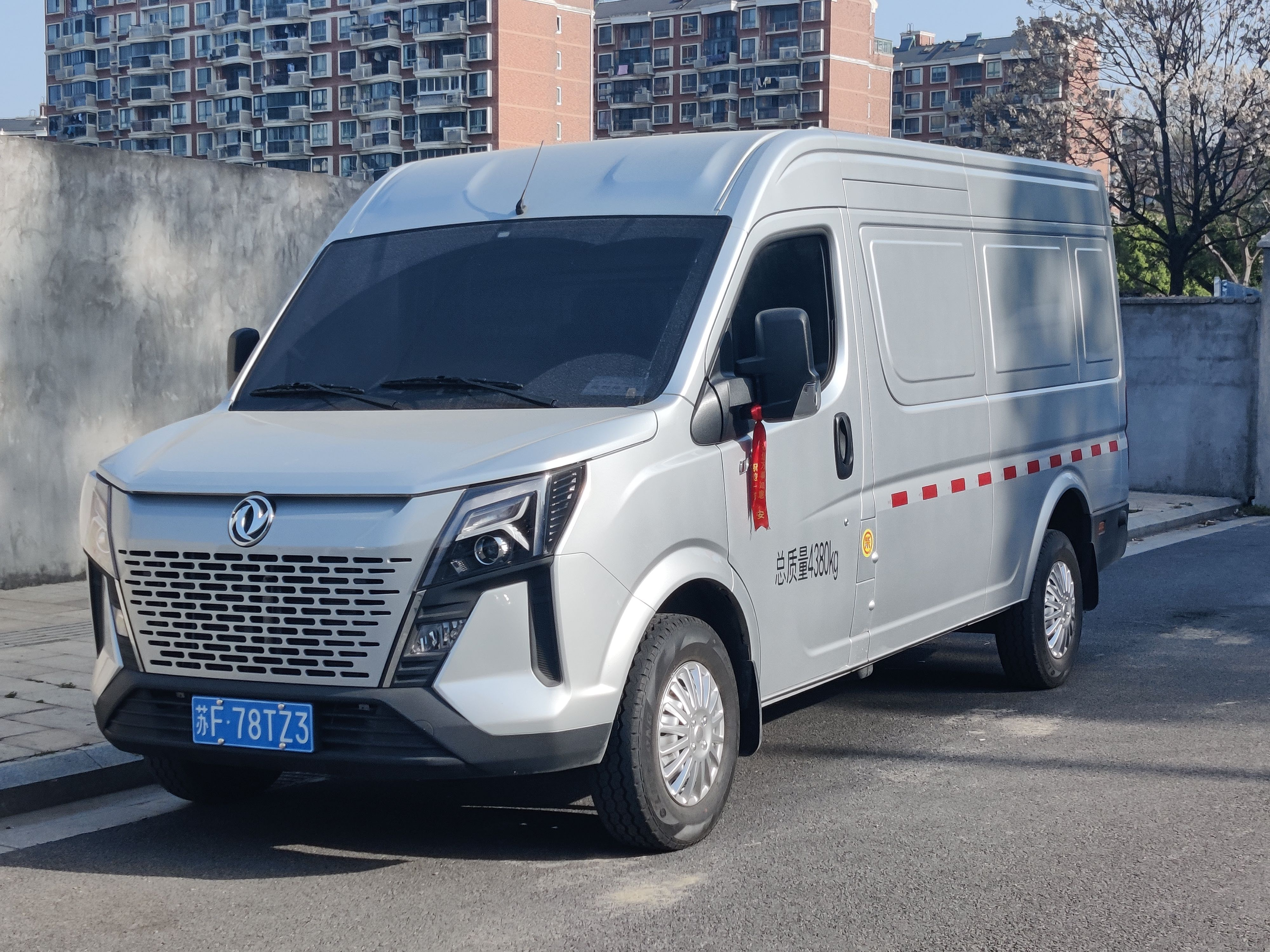
Yufeng 4+

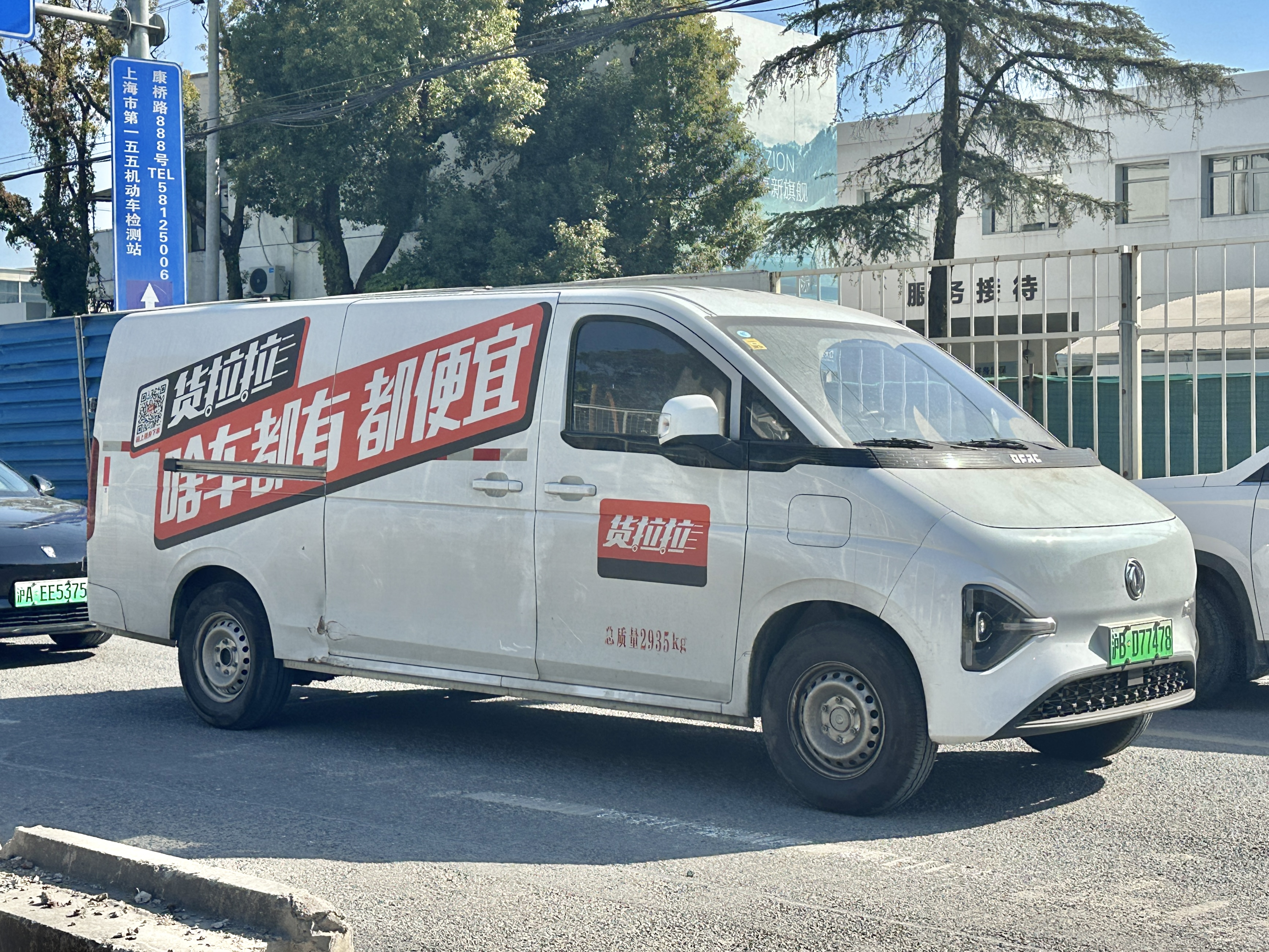
Ruilida V series

=== Vasol (Dongfeng Huashen) ===
The light commercial vehicle products of Dongfeng Automobile Company are sold under the Dongfeng Automobile Company subsidiary, Vasol (Dongfeng Huashen) (东风华神) brand.

- Dongfeng Huashen Tianlai
- Dongfeng Huashen T1
- Dongfeng Huashen T3
- Dongfeng Huashen T5
- Dongfeng Huashen T7
- Dongfeng Huashen T15
- Dongfeng Huashen F5
- Dongfeng Teshang
- Dongfeng Jingying
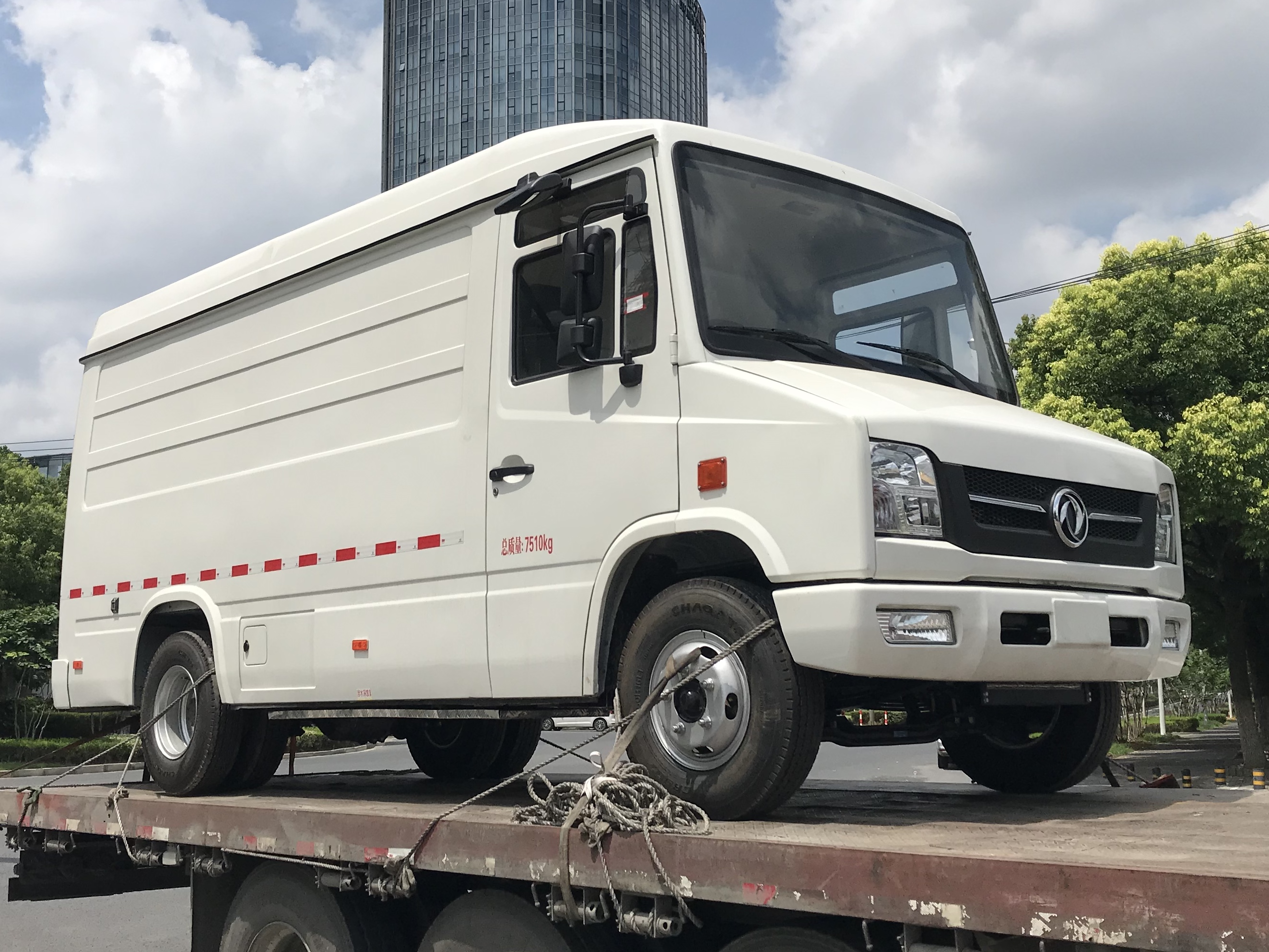
Dongfeng Huashen Tianlai

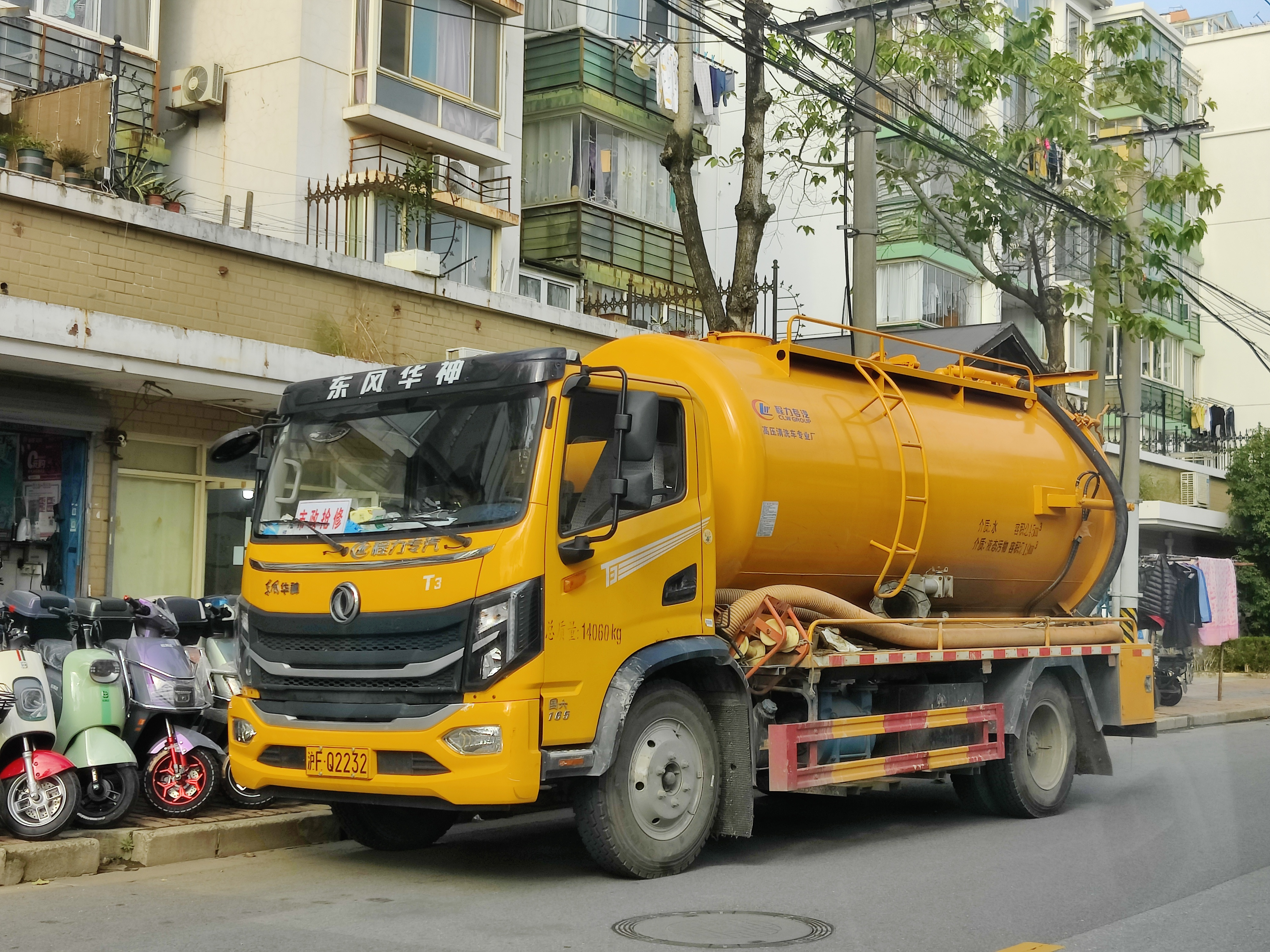
Dongfeng Huashen T3

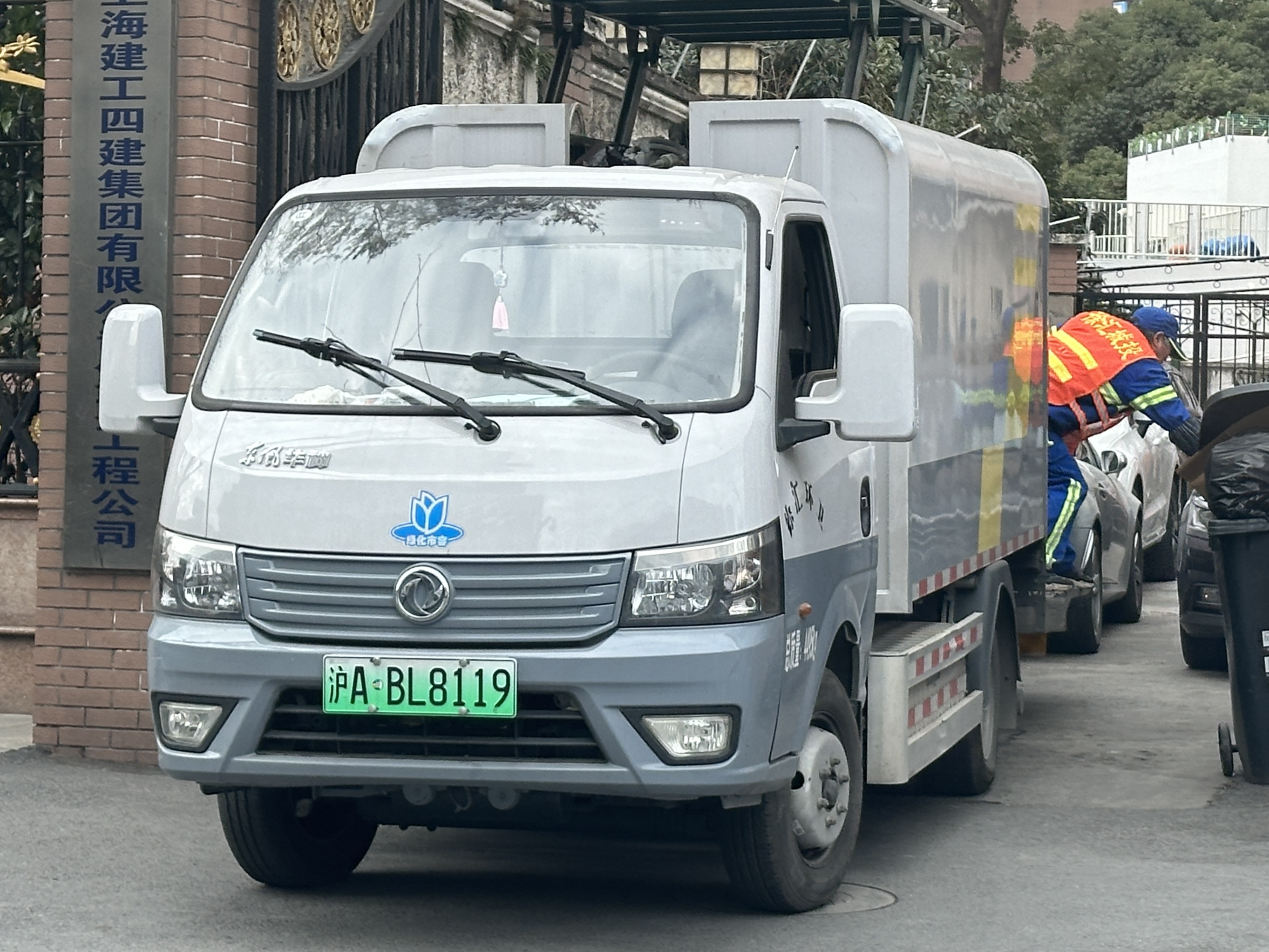
Dongfeng Huashen T15
