= Dongfeng Huashen Tianlai =

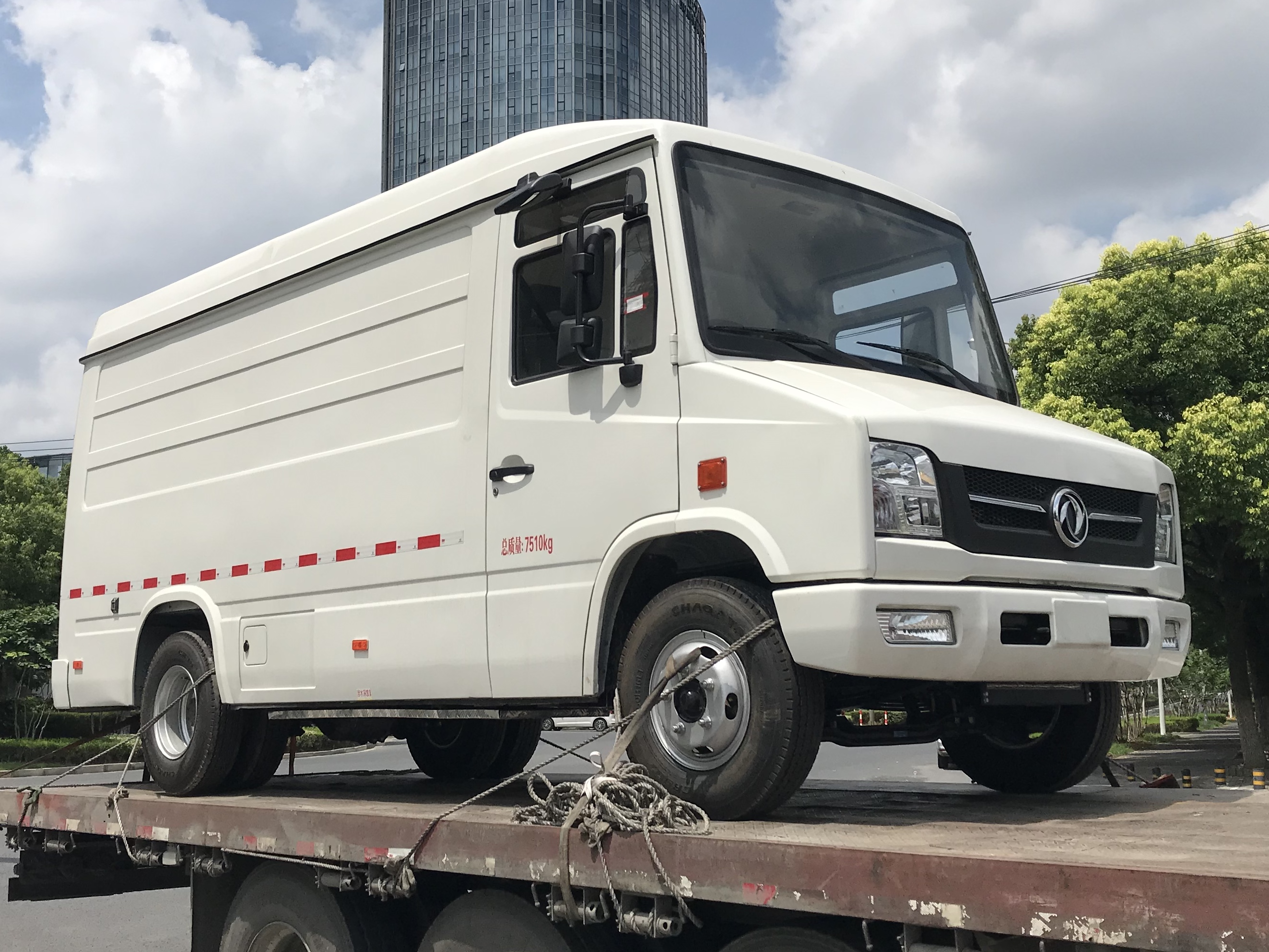

Overview
- Manufacturer: Dongfeng Automobile Company
- Production: 2017–2020
- Assembly: China: Shiyan, Hubei

Body and chassis
- Body style: 4-door panel van 6-door van 2-door pickup truck
- Layout: FMR layout

Powertrain
- Engine: Yuchai YC4FA130-50 Diesel 3.0L inline-4
- Transmission: 5-speed manual

Dimensions
- Wheelbase: 3,600 mm (141.7 in)
- Length: 5,998 mm (236.1 in)
- Width: 2,060 mm (81.1 in)
- Height: 2,520 mm (99.2 in)
- Curb weight: 4.495 tons

The Dongfeng Huashen Tianlai (东风华神天来) is a range of full-size vans produced by the Chinese automaker Dongfeng Automobile Company under the Vasol or Huashen (华神) brand. The Tianlai was introduced for the 2017 model year and later listed under the Vasol brand introduced in 2018. The Tianlai was produced as a cargo van, passenger van, minibus and cutaway van chassis.

== Overview ==
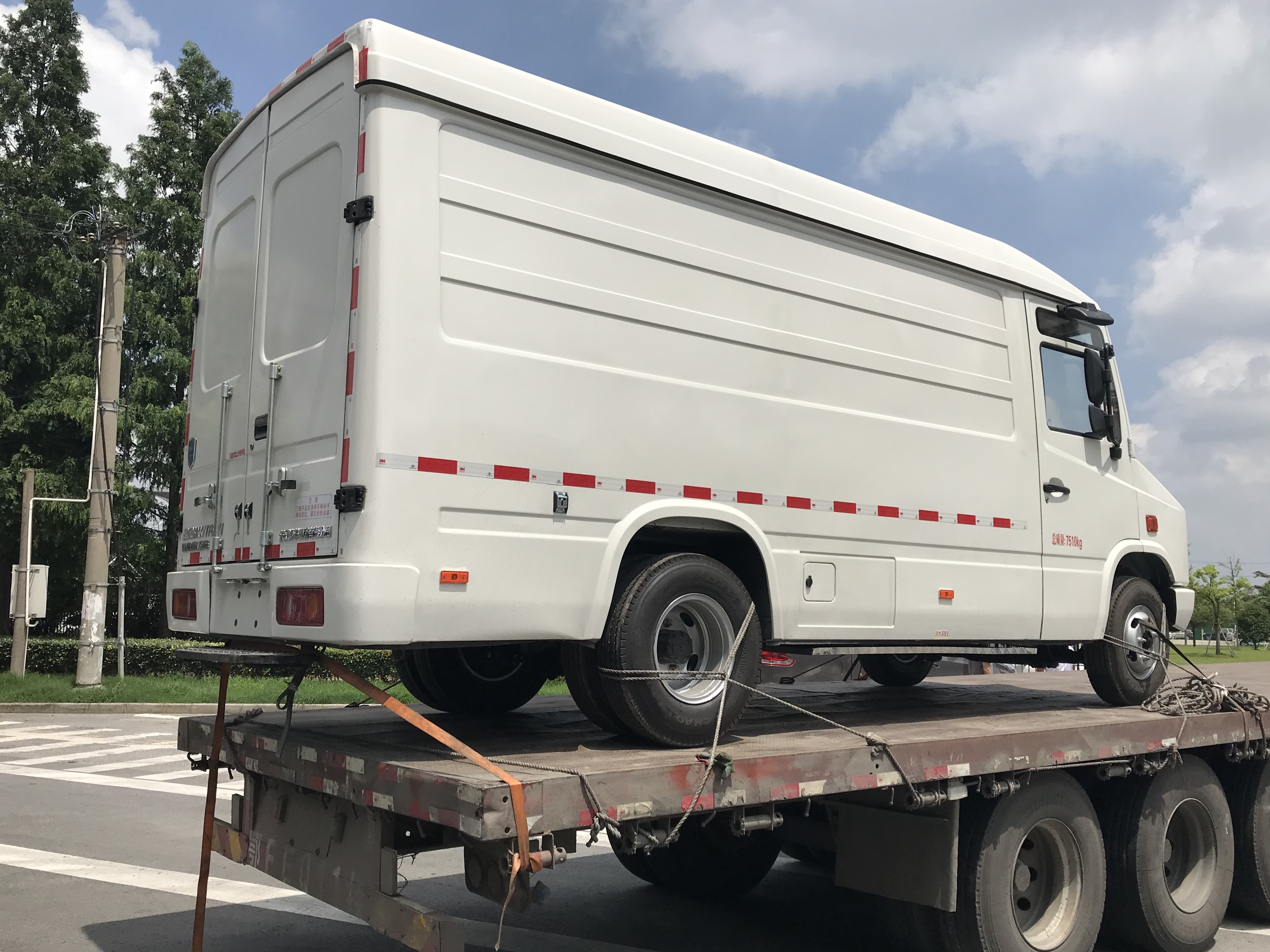
Huashen Tianlai rear

The Dongfeng Huashen Tianlai is powered by a lone 3.0-litre inline-4 diesel engine by Yuchai producing 130hp and 340N·m mated to a 5-speed manual transmission.

The Huashen Tianlai is rear wheel drive and is equipped with two spare tires and leaf spring suspension. The capacity of the Huashen Tianlai panel van reaches 14 cubic meters.

=== Electric panel van ===
The electric panel van version of the Huashen Tianlai is powered by a 95hp electric motor with a range of 305km and a top speed of 90km/h. The panel van has a cargo area dimensions of 2.93 meter by 1.88 meter by 1.8 meter.
