= Dongfeng Ruilida V-series =

Battery electric van

Dongfeng Ruilida V5/V7/V8E
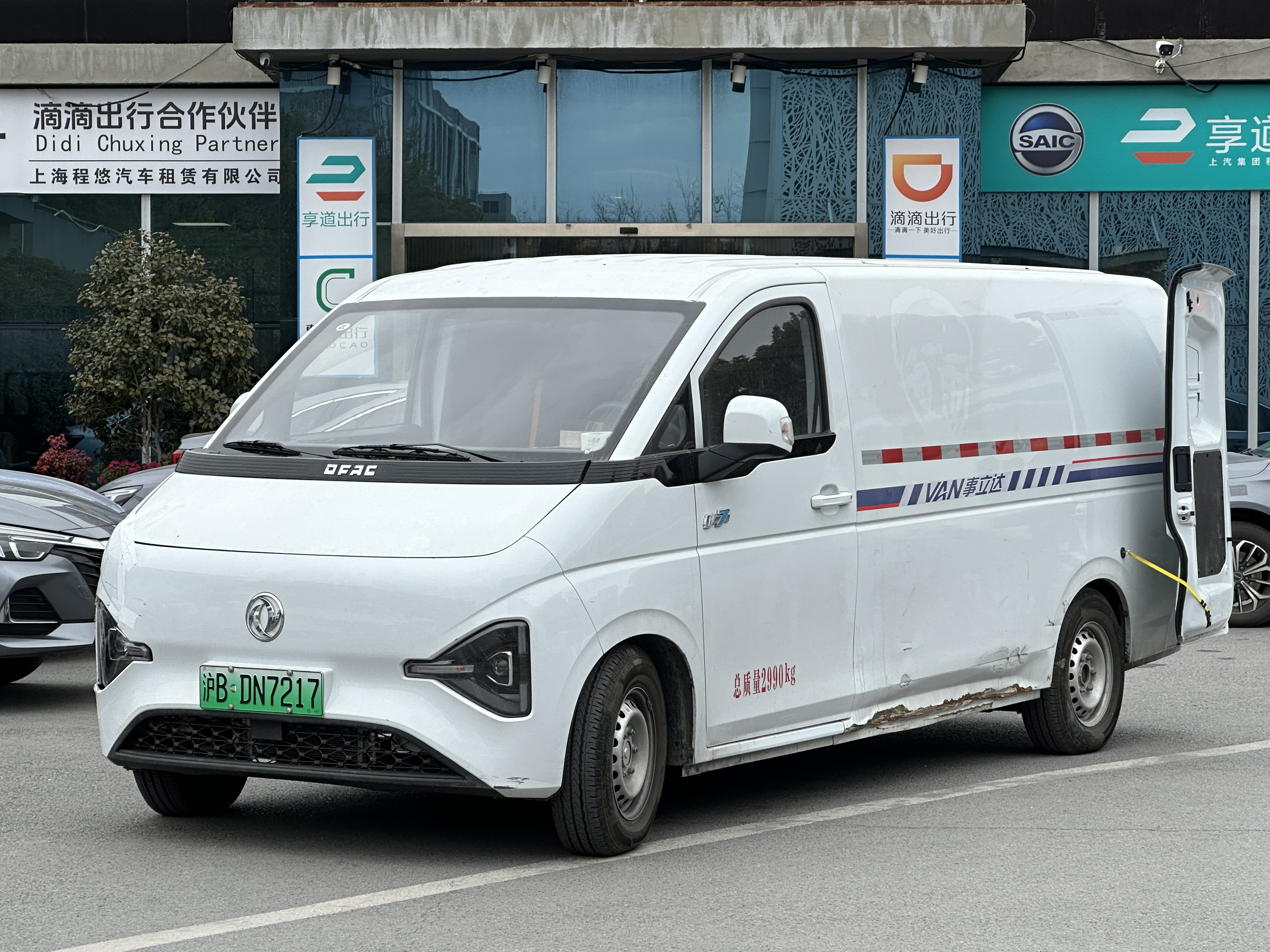
- The Dongfeng Ruilida V7 in Shanghai.

Overview
- Manufacturer: Dongfeng Automobile Company
- Production: 2025–present
- Assembly: China

Body and chassis
- Class: Light commercial vehicle
- Body style: 4-door van (V5/V7); 5-door van (V8E)
- Layout: Rear-engine, rear-wheel-drive
- Platform: V platform

Powertrain
- Electric motor: 60 kW permanent magnet synchronous
- Power output: 60 kW (80 hp; 82 PS)
- Battery: 41.86 kWh LFP CATL/CALB; 50.38 kWh LFP CALB; 53.58 LFP CATL
- Electric range: 310–380 km (193–236 mi) (CLTC)

Dimensions
- Wheelbase: 3,400 mm (133.9 in)
- Length: 5,270 mm (207.5 in)
- Width: 1,730 mm (68.1 in) (V5); 1,890 mm (74.4 in) (V7/V8E)
- Height: 1,890 mm (74.4 in) (V5); 1,998 mm (78.7 in) (V7/V8E)

The Dongfeng Ruilida V-series is a series of battery electric van designed and produced by the Chinese automaker Dongfeng Automobile Company (DFAC) since 2025. The Dongfeng Ruilida V-series is underpinned by Dongfeng Light Vehicle's next-generation V platform, a modular architecture developed in house by DFAC supporting both electric and internal combustion powertrains with various vehicle body styles including light vans and light trucks.

== Overview ==
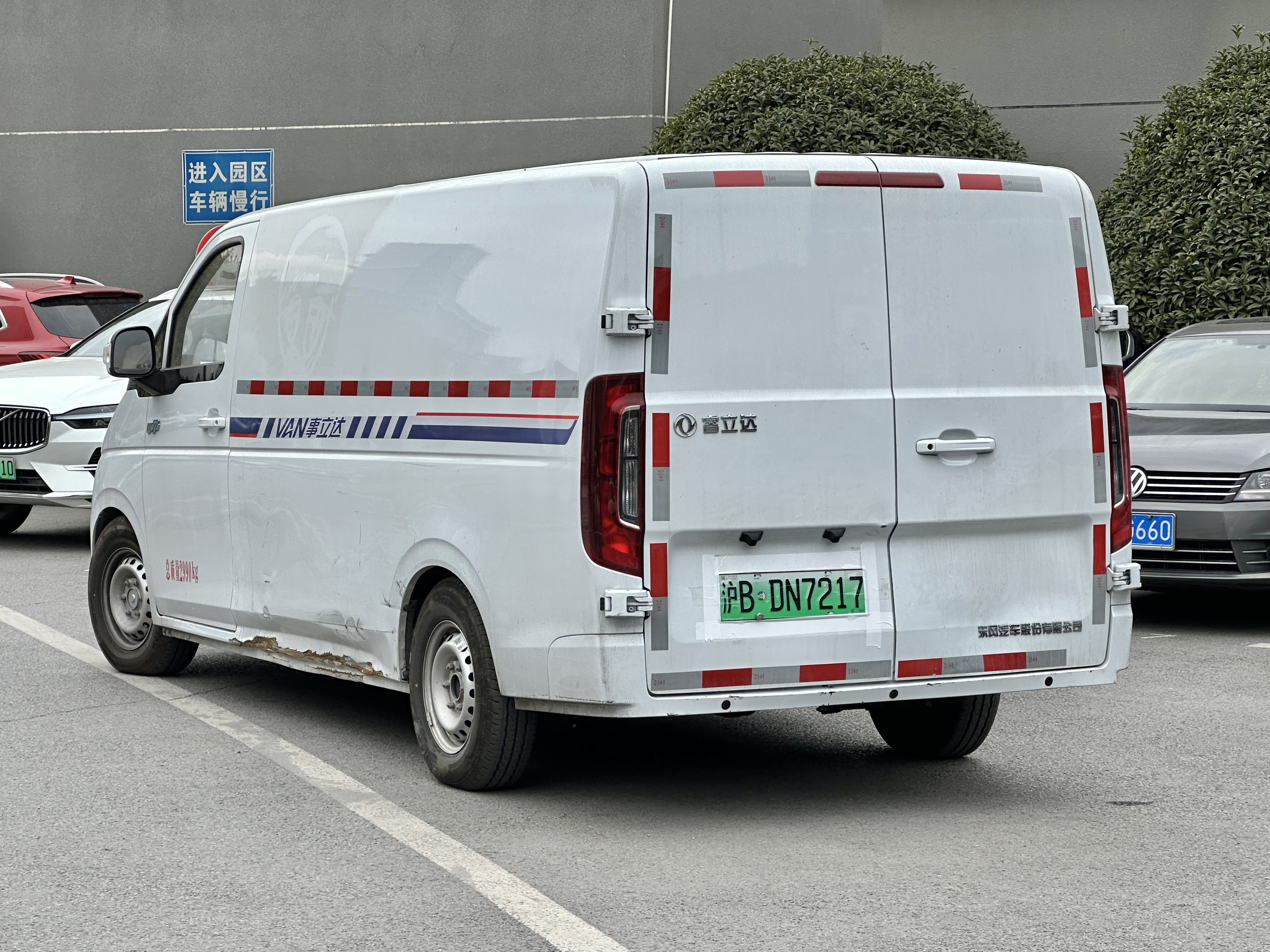
Rear view

The Dongfeng Ruilida (Chinese: 睿立达; pinyin: ruìlìdá) sub-brand under Dongfeng Light Vehicle and the first model of the V-series, the V5 was launched in China on 23 December 2024.

== Specifications ==
The Ruilida V5 has two CATL-supplied battery variants with 41.86 kWh and 53.58 kWh capacity supporting a ranges of 310 and 380 km (193 and 236 mi), respectively. Two variants with CALB supplied 41.86 kWh battery and 50.38 kWh battery supporting a range of 310 and 365 km (193 and 227 mi), respectively. The V5 has rear positioned electric motor with a top speed of 90 km/h (56 mph) and a maximum output of 60 kW (80 hp; 82 PS).

The Ruilida V5 enclosed van configuration provides 6.6 cubic metres (233 cu ft) of cargo capacity, while the V7 variant offers a 7.27 cubic metres (257 cu ft) of cargo space. The V5 and most variants of the V7 are strictly 2-seater panel van models while a single V7 variant and the V8E model is available as a 6-seater vehicle. The V5 and V7 are 4-door vans while the V8E, being a passenger van, offers 5-doors.
