= Dongfeng Motor Group =

Chinese automotive holding company

- Trade name: DFG
- Formerly: Dongfeng Motor Co., Ltd.; Dongfeng Automobile Industry Investment Co., Ltd.
- Type: Public
Traded as
unlisted	(A share)
SEHK: 489	(H share)
- ISIN: CNE100000312
- Industry: Automotive
- Founded: 18 May 2001; 25 years ago
- Founder: Dongfeng Motor Corporation
- Headquarters: Dongfeng Road, Wuhan, Hubei, China
- Area served: Worldwide
- Production output: ▼2,900,000 (2021)
- Brands: Dongfeng Liuzhou Motor; Dongfeng Fengshen; Dongfeng Mengshi
- Revenue: ▲CN¥125.016 billion (2017)
- Net income: ▲CN¥14.063 billion (2017)
- Total assets: ▲CN¥212.492 billion (2017)
- Total equity: ▲CN¥108.201 billion (2017)
- Number of employees: 146,843 (end 2017)
- Parent: SASAC (via Dongfeng Motor Corporation)

Chinese name
- Simplified Chinese: 东风汽车集团股份有限公司
- Traditional Chinese: 東風汽車集團股份有限公司
- Literal meaning: Dongfeng Motor Group Joint-stock Limited Corporation
Transcriptions
Standard Mandarin
- Hanyu Pinyin: Dōngfēng Qìchē Jítuán Gǔfèn Yǒuxiàn Gōngsī

Chinese short name
- Simplified Chinese: 东风集团
- Traditional Chinese: 東風集團
- Literal meaning: Dongfeng Group
Transcriptions
Standard Mandarin
- Hanyu Pinyin: Dōngfēng Jítuán
- Website: www.dfmg.com.cn
- Footnotes in consolidated financial statement; financial figure of the joint ventures were consolidated by equity method; figure of production volume are including joint ventures

Dongfeng Motor Group Co., Ltd., doing business as DFG, is a Chinese holding company based in Wuhan, Hubei. Its H shares were listed on the Hong Kong stock exchange.

Dongfeng Motor Group formed several joint ventures with other foreign automobile makers, namely Luxgen, Honda, Renault-Nissan and Stellantis (which was created by the merger of Fiat Chrysler Automobiles and Groupe PSA). It has also leased several trademarks from the parent company Dongfeng Motor Corporation since 2005.

Dongfeng Motor Group was ranked 550th in 2017 Forbes Global 2000 List. As of 30 April 2018, the market capitalization of its H shares (about 33.15% of total share capital) was HK$24.931 billion.

== History ==
Dongfeng Motor Group (then known as Dongfeng Motor Co., Ltd.) was incorporated on 18 May 2001 as a special purpose vehicle for debt-to-equity swap of Dongfeng Motor Corporation. The other shareholders were fellow state-owned financial companies China Huarong Asset Management, China Cinda Asset Management, China Orient Asset Management, China Great Wall Asset Management and China Development Bank for a total of 42.86% stake. In 2003, [new] Dongfeng Motor Co., Ltd. was incorporated as a joint venture of Dongfeng Motor Group and Nissan. Dongfeng Motor Group, at that time still known as [old] Dongfeng Motor Co., Ltd., was renamed to Dongfeng Automobile Industry Investment.

In August 2004, Dongfeng Motor Group bought back all the stakes of Dongfeng Motor Group from other stakeholders, for a total of CN¥4.6 billion. It also became a "company limited by shares" (Chinese: 股份有限公司, analog of public limited company) in October 2004, with a new name Dongfeng Motor Group. The company issued H share and became a listed company on 7 December 2005.

In 2014, the plan to establish Dongfeng Commercial Vehicle was approved by the National Development and Reform Commission. It would acquire some business and assets from the joint venture Dongfeng Motor Co., Ltd. In turn Volvo acquired 45% stake of Dongfeng Commercial Vehicle from Dongfeng Motor Group. At the same time Dongfeng Nissan Diesel Motor would be a wholly owned subsidiary of Dongfeng Commercial Vehicle. In January 2015, Dongfeng Commercial Vehicle was established.

== Subsidiaries ==
As of 24 December 2023

Name	Chinese name	Percentage
Voyah Automotive Technology Co., Ltd.	岚图汽车科技有限公司	55
Dongfeng Motor Group Co., Ltd. Mengshi Automotive Technology Co., Ltd.	东风汽车集团股份有限公司猛士汽车科技公司	55
Dongfeng Commercial Vehicle	东风商用车有限公司	55
Dongfeng Liuzhou Motor	东风柳州汽车有限公司	75
Dongfeng Motor Finance	东风汽车财务有限公司	100
China Dongfeng Motor Industry Import and Export	中国东风汽车工业进出口有限公司	
Dongfeng Electrical Vehicle	东风电动车辆股份有限公司	90.07
Dongfeng Off-road Vehicle	东风越野车有限公司	100
Dongfeng (Shiyan) Special Purpose Commercial Vehicle	东风（十堰）特种商用车有限公司	75.08
Dongfeng Peugeot Citroën Automobile Sales	东风标致雪铁龙汽车销售有限责任公司	50
Dongvo (Hangzhou) Truck	东沃(杭州)卡车有限公司	

- Dongfeng (Wuhan) Engineering Consulting
- Dongfeng Motor Investment (Shanghai)
- Dongfeng Getrag Automobile Transmission
- Honda Motor (China) Investment

== Divisions ==
As of 31 December 2016

- Dongfeng Passenger Vehicle Company
- Dongfeng Research & Development Centre

== Joint ventures ==
As of 27 August 2018

- Dongfeng Motor Co., Ltd. (50%)
  - Zhengzhou Nissan Automobile (79.65%)
  - Dongfeng Automobile Co., Ltd. (60.1%)
    - Dongfeng Cummins Engine (50%)
- Dongfeng Honda Automobile (50%)
- Dongfeng Honda Engine (50%)
- Dongfeng Honda Auto Parts (44%)
- Dongfeng Peugeot-Citroën Automobile (50%)
- Dongfeng Peugeot-Citroën Finance (50%)
- Dongfeng Renault Automobile (50%)
- Dongfeng Daewoo ECC (50%)
- Dongfeng Ajin Industrial Co., Ltd. (50%)

== Equity interests ==
As of 31 December 2016

- Dongfeng Nissan Auto Finance (35%)
- Stellantis (3.17%)
- Wuhan Lear-DFM Auto Electric (25%)

== Shareholders ==
As of 31 December 2016, Dongfeng Motor Corporation is the largest shareholder for 66.86% shares. It was followed by Standard Chartered (2.81%), Prudential plc (2.64%), BlackRock (2.00%) and Edinburgh Partners (1.78%), all were H share owners and acted as investment managers (trustees).
