= Dongfeng E-Star =

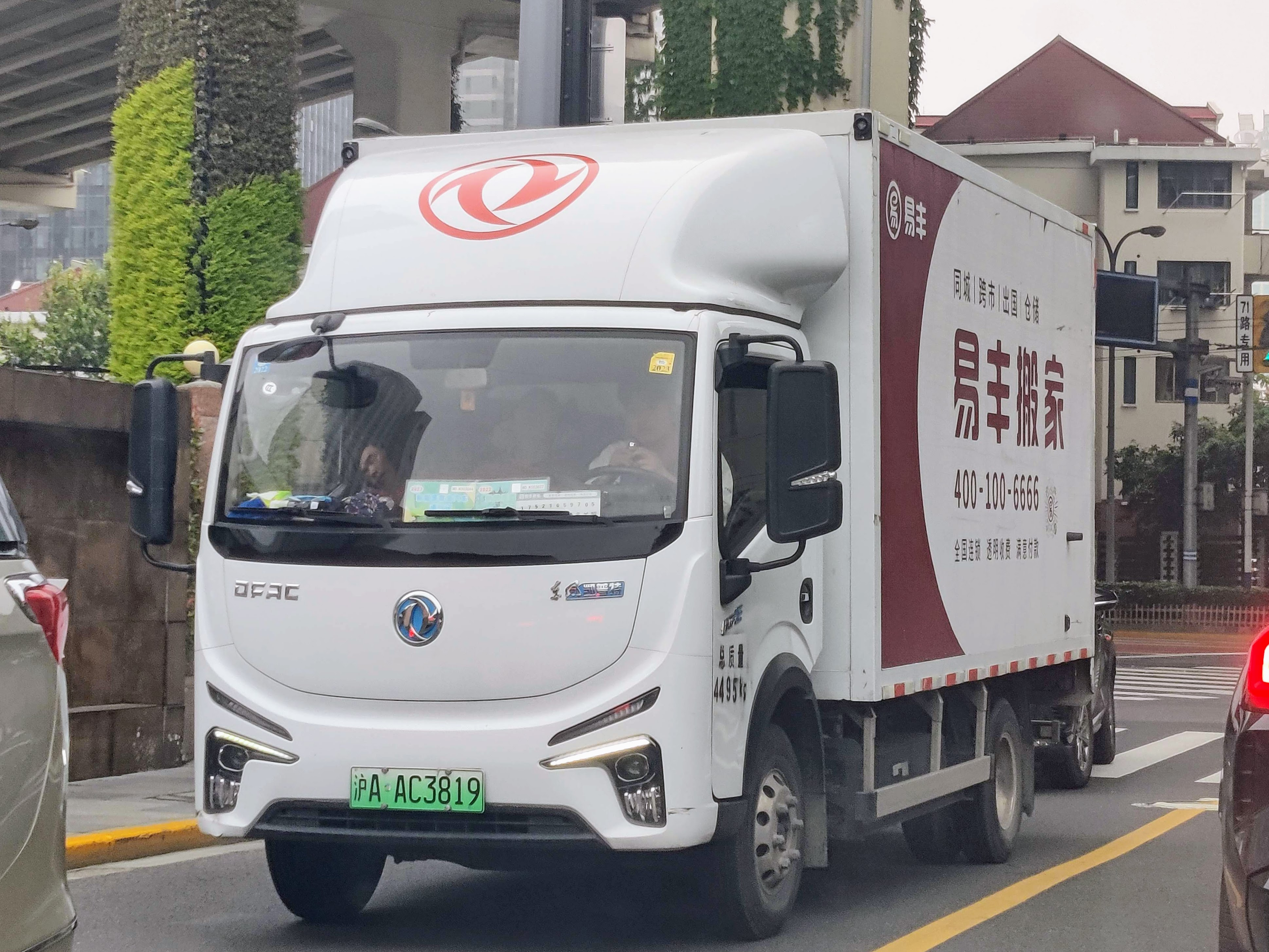
- Dongfeng Captain E-Star in Shanghai

Overview
- Manufacturer: Dongfeng Motor Corporation
- Also called: JoyFun E-Star
- Assembly: China

Powertrain
- Electric motor: 120 kW (160 hp)
- Battery: 81 kWh
- Range: 250 km (160 mi)

Dimensions
- Wheelbase: 3,308 mm (130.2 in)
- Length: 5,995 mm (236.0 in)
- Width: 2,180 mm (85.8 in)
- Height: 2,940 mm (115.7 in)
- Curb weight: 2,950 kg (6,504 lb)

Chronology
- Predecessor: Dongfeng EQ5040EV

The Dongfeng E-Star is an electric urban distribution truck manufactured by Chinese state-owned Dongfeng Motor Corporation under the "Captain" EV series of the DFAC Dongfeng Automobile Company brand.

== Overview ==
The E-Star can carry up to 4.25 tonnes, but has been scaled down to 3.5 tonnes so it can also be driven with a category B licence. It has a separate chassis on which different body types can be fitted. The electric propulsion system consists of a 120 kW (160 hp) motor with an instant torque of 320 N⋅m (240 lbf⋅ft) and a range of up to 250 km (160 mi).
