= Dongfeng Yufeng =

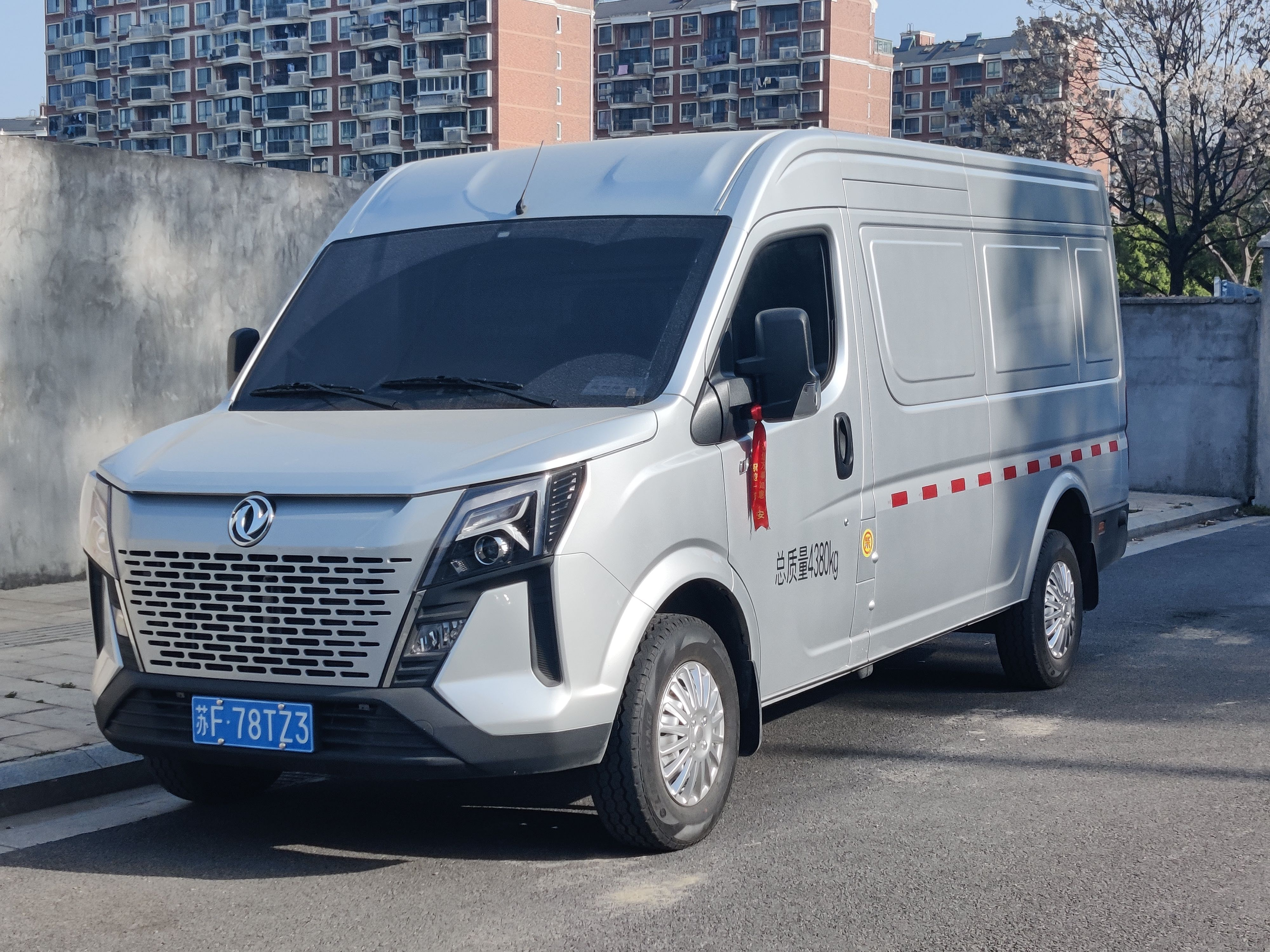

Overview
- Manufacturer: Dongfeng Motor Co., Ltd.
- Also called: Dongfeng U-Vane; Dongfeng E-Travel
- Production: 2012–present
- Assembly: Zhengzhou, China

Body and chassis
- Class: Light commercial vehicle (M)
- Body style: 4-door van/minibus

The Dongfeng Yufeng (东风御风) or Dongfeng E-Travel is a light commercial van produced by the Chinese automaker Dongfeng since 2012.

== Overview ==
The Dongfeng Yufeng launched in 2012 was powered by a 3.0 liter fuel injected turbo diesel engine with a maximum horsepower of 136 hp and a torque of 300N·m. Three wheelbase models were available including a 3100mm short wheelbase version, a 3610mm regular wheelbase version, and a 4210mm long wheelbase version. Two variants of roof heights were also offered including a 2317mm regular version and a 2532mm tall roof version. All versions available as passenger or panel van models.

A facelifted model was revealed in July 2016 with the updated powertrain qualified for the National Standard V emissions regulation in China.

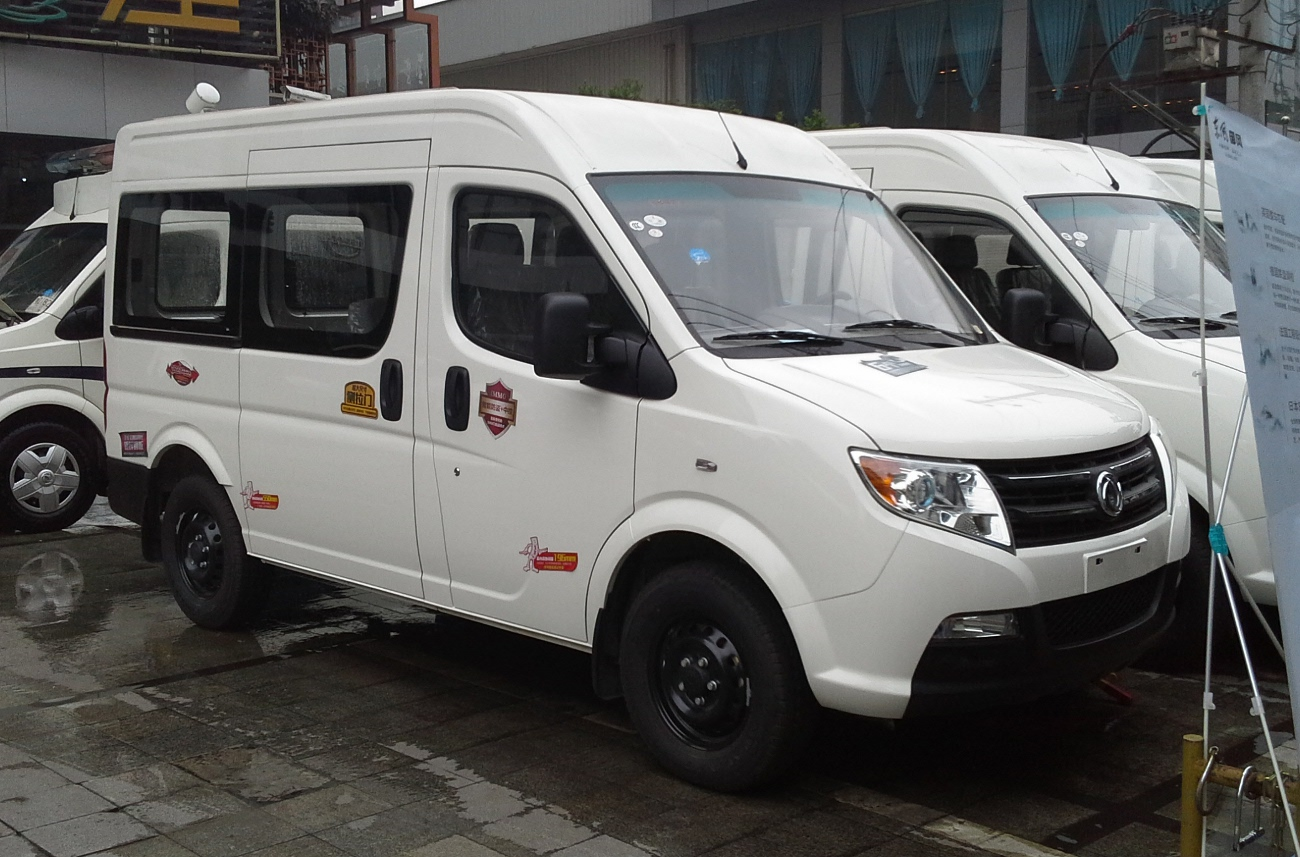
Original 2012 Dongfeng (DFAC) Yufeng SWB front quarter view

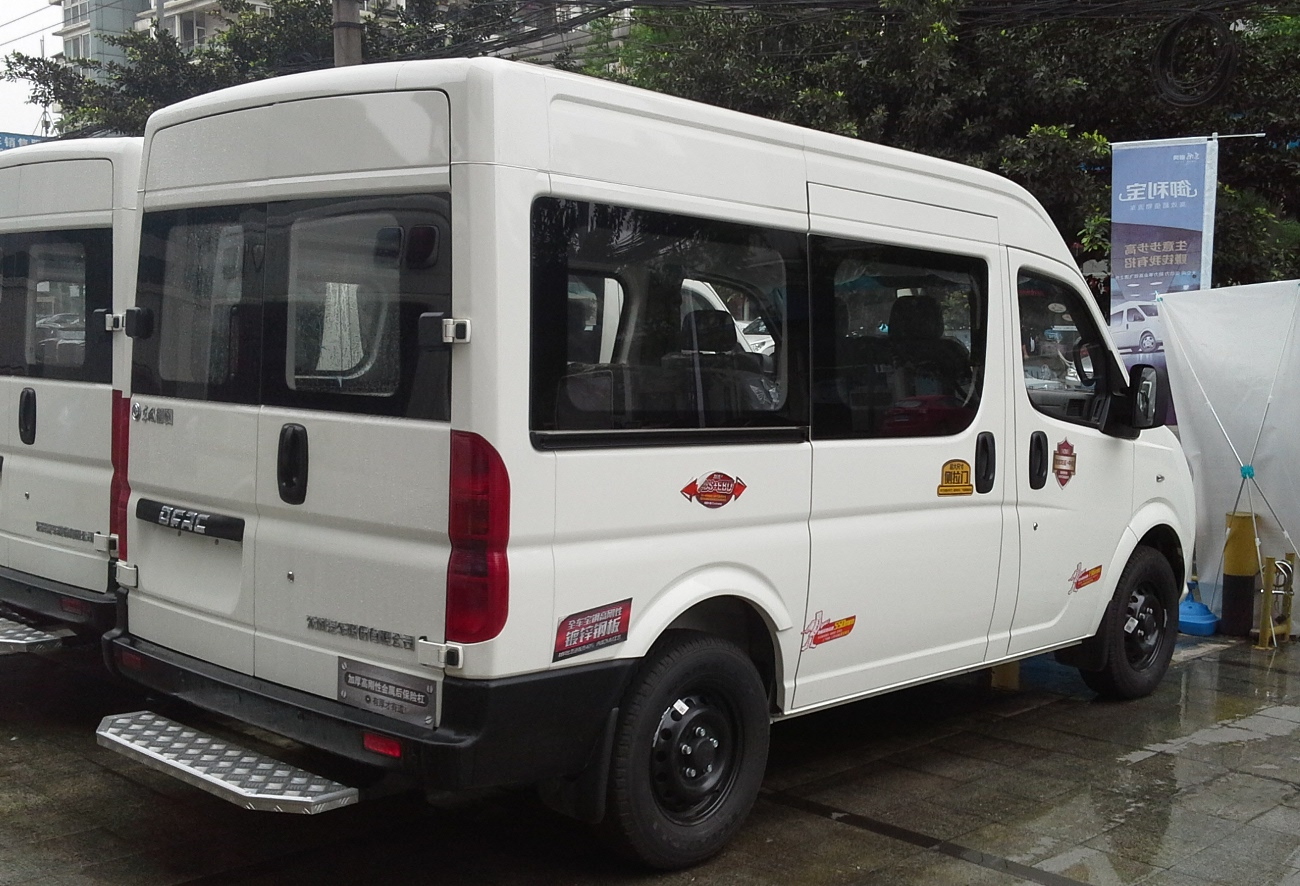
Original 2012 Dongfeng (DFAC) Yufeng SWB rear quarter view

=== V9 and A100 logistics version ===
The V9 moniker was added for the passenger versions, while another variant called the A100 logistics version was launched in 2018 alongside the EA100 electric logistics version. The V9 and A100 adds a new powertrain with a Weichai Power supplied 2.3-litre turbo engine producing 110hp and 280N·m and a 2.5-litre turbo engine producing 136hp and 300N·m, with the transmission being Hyundai WIA supplied 6-speed manual transmissions, with optional automatic transmissions available.

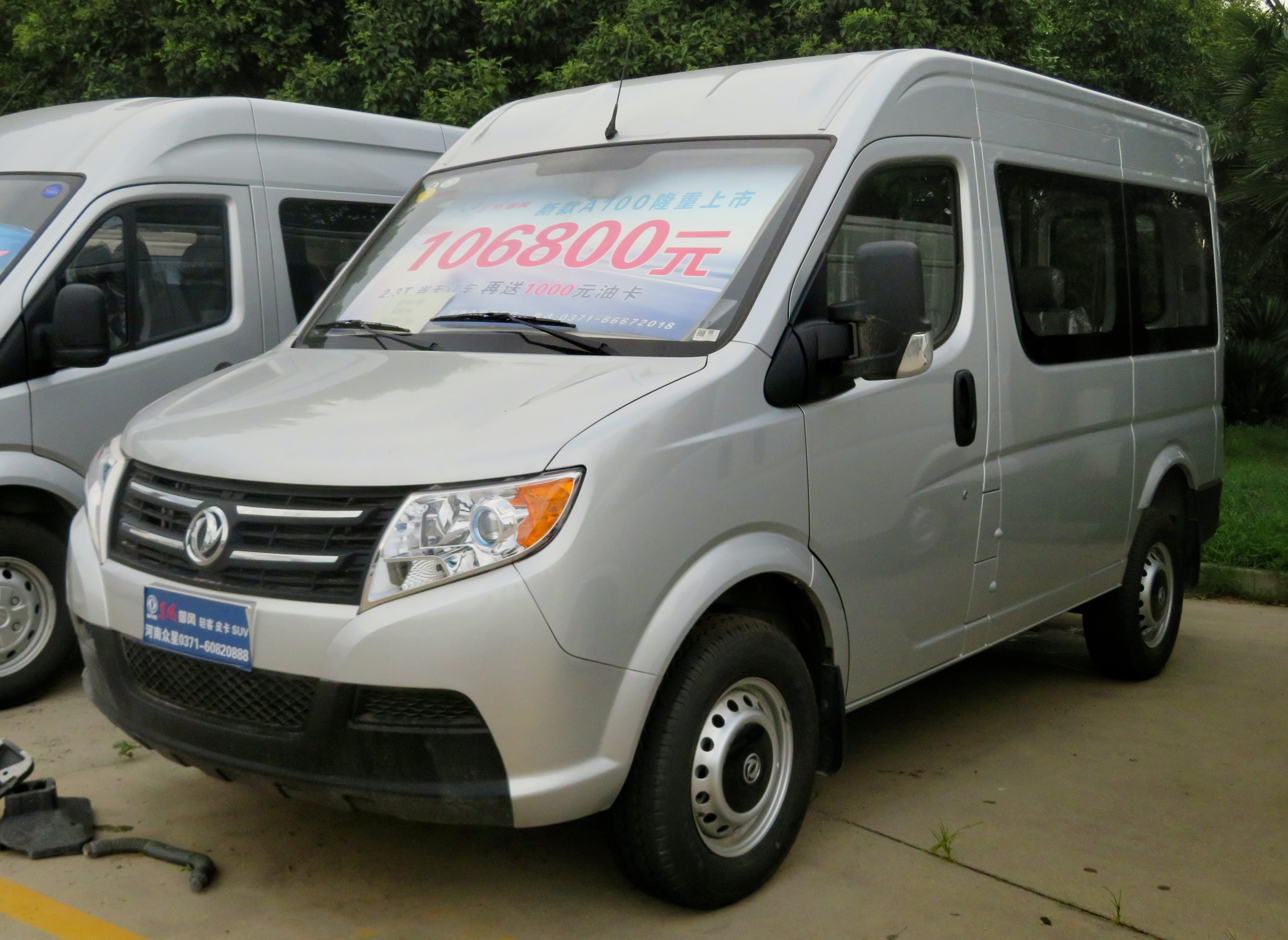
2018 Dongfeng (DFAC) Yufeng SWB front quarter view

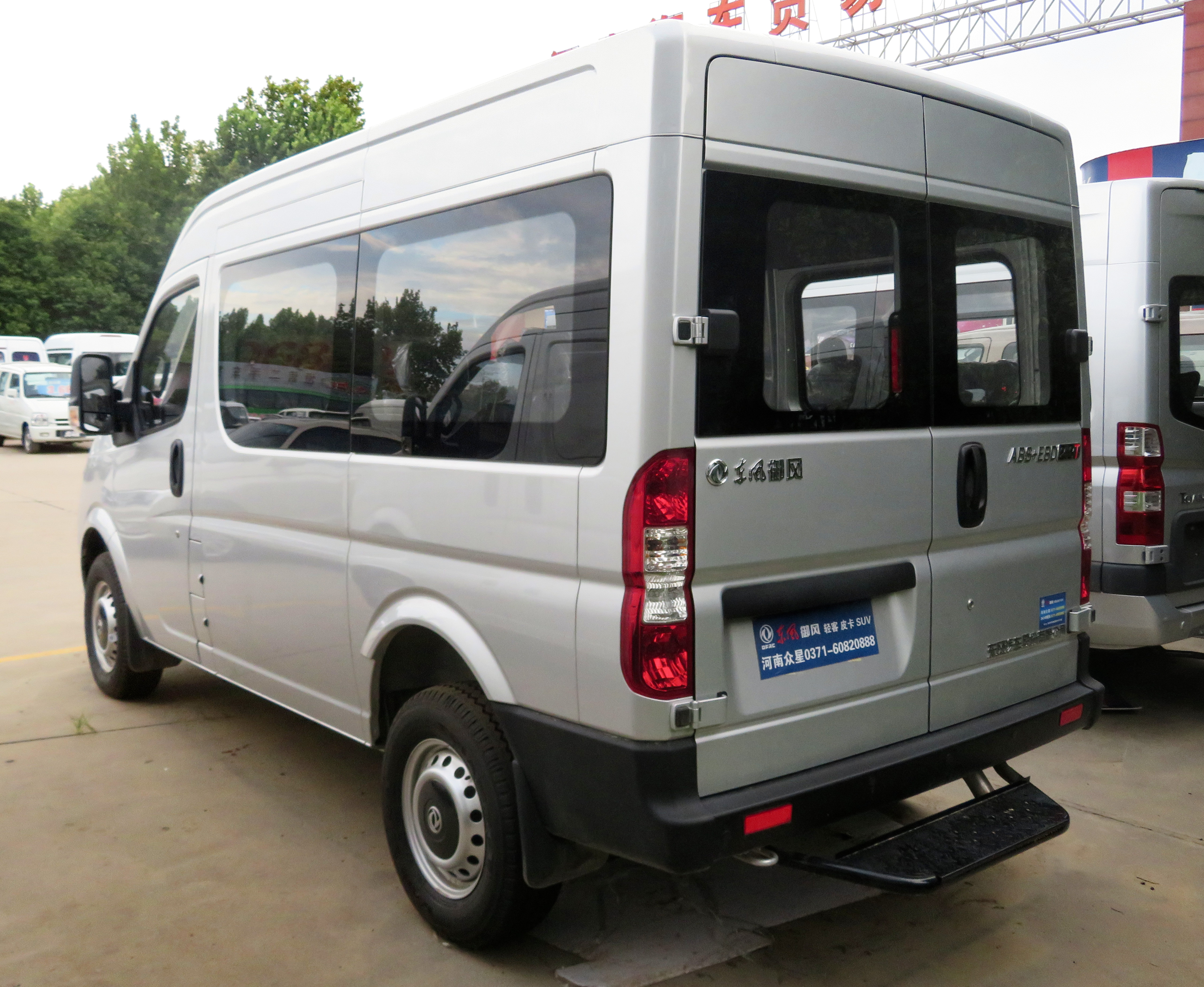
2018 Dongfeng (DFAC) Yufeng SWB rear quarter view

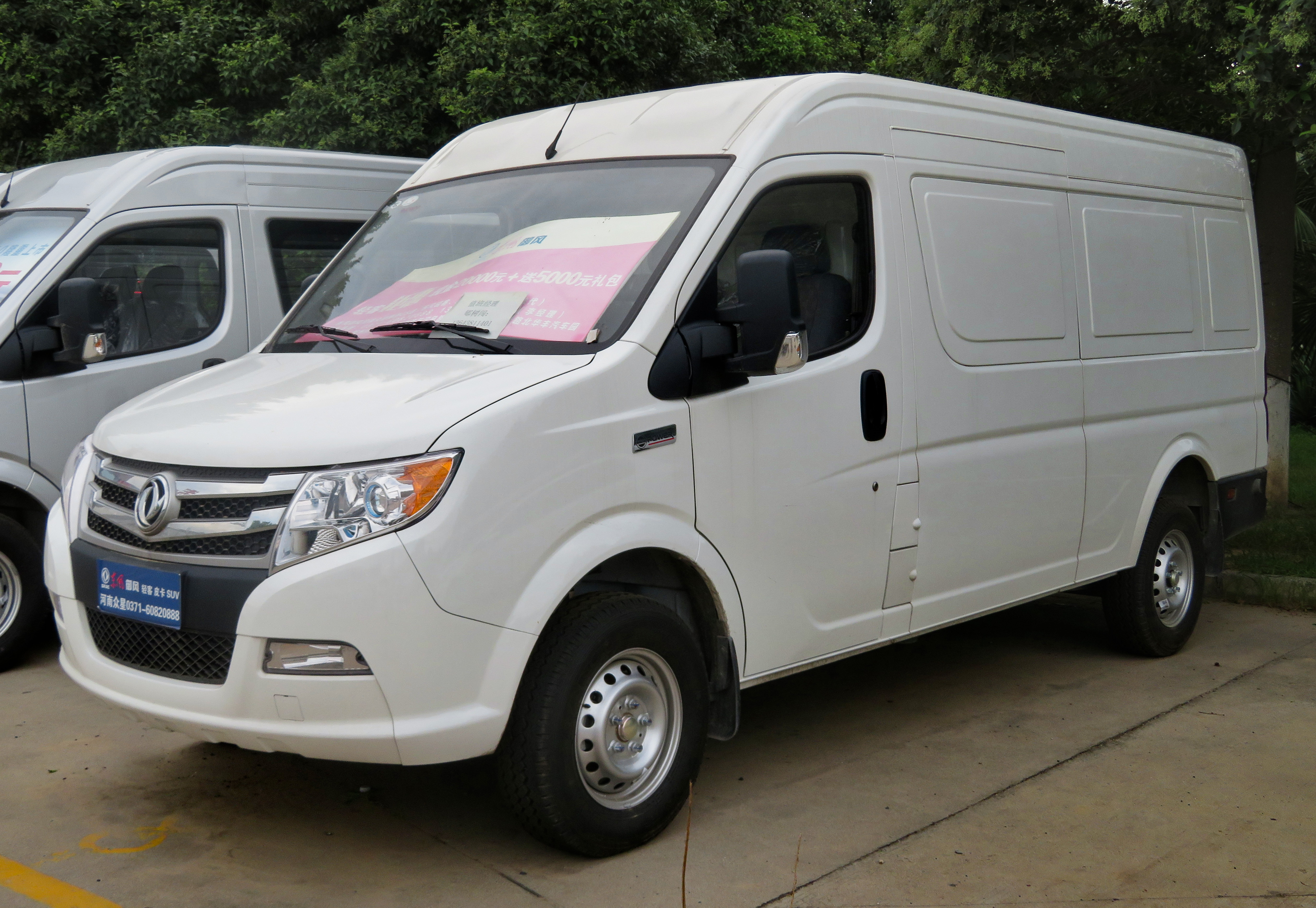
2018 Dongfeng (DFAC) Yufeng LWB panel front quarter view

=== V9+ facelift ===
The Yufeng V9+ is the facelift for the 2023 model year with a completely redesigned front end. The V9+ is available as a cargo van with a 2.3-litre turbo engine producing 100kW and 350N·m or a 2.3-litre turbo engine producing 105kW and 380N·m. The V9+ passenger version shares the same powertrain with an addition of a 2.0-litre turbo engine.

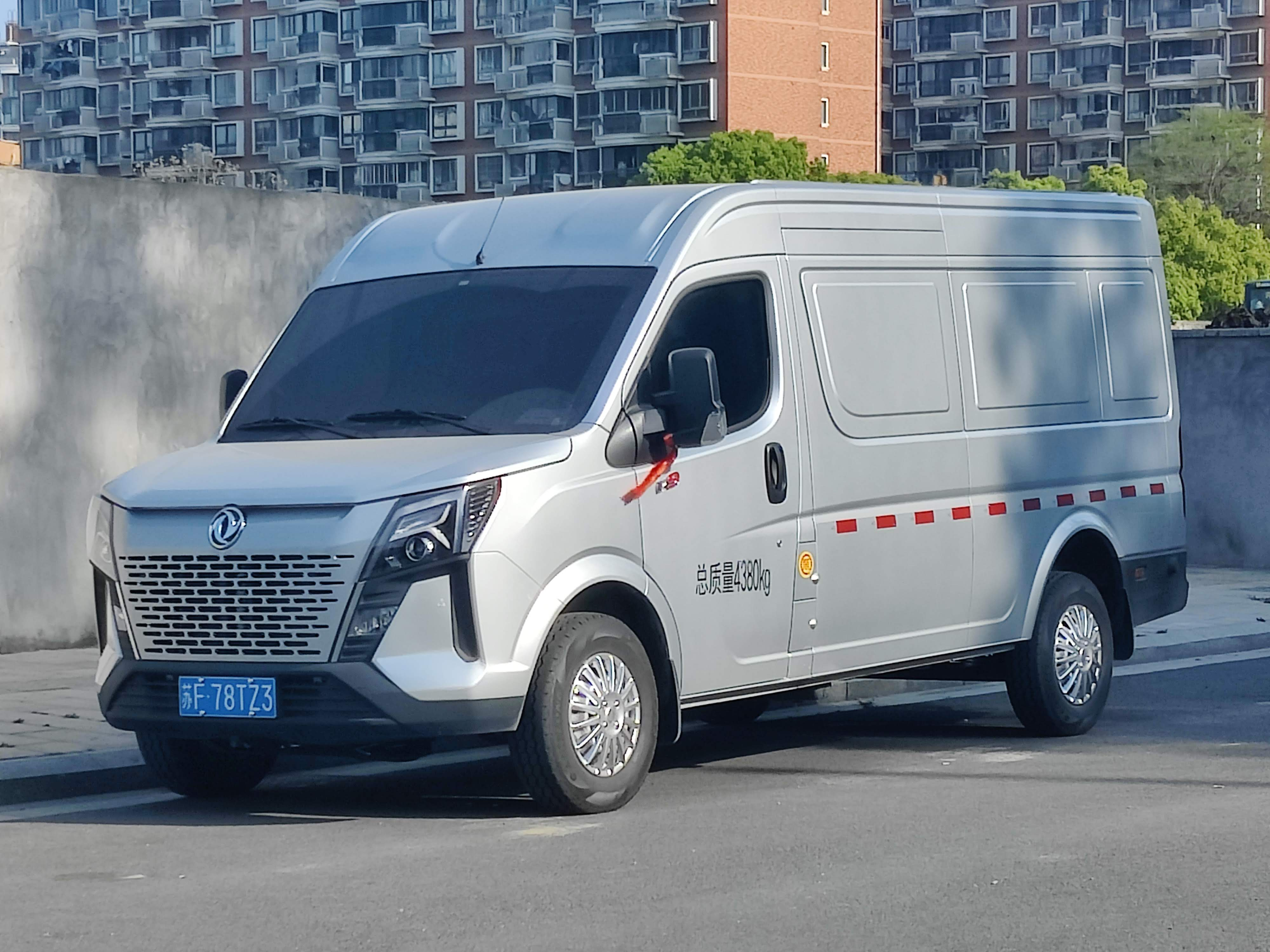
2023 Dongfeng (DFAC) Yufeng V9+ front quarter view

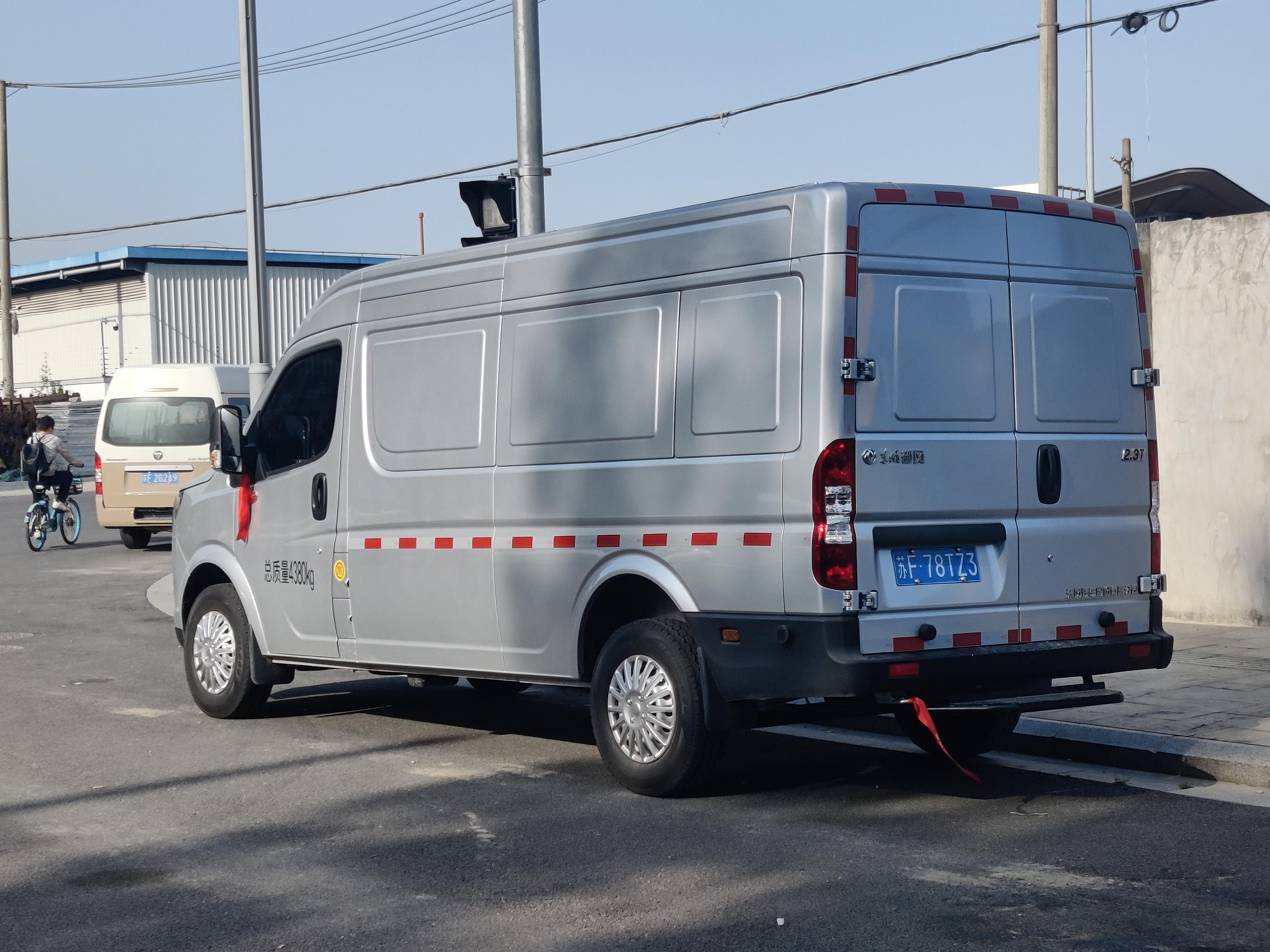
2023 Dongfeng (DFAC) Yufeng V9+ rear quarter view
