= Momenta =

Chinese autonomous driving company

Momenta Global Ltd.
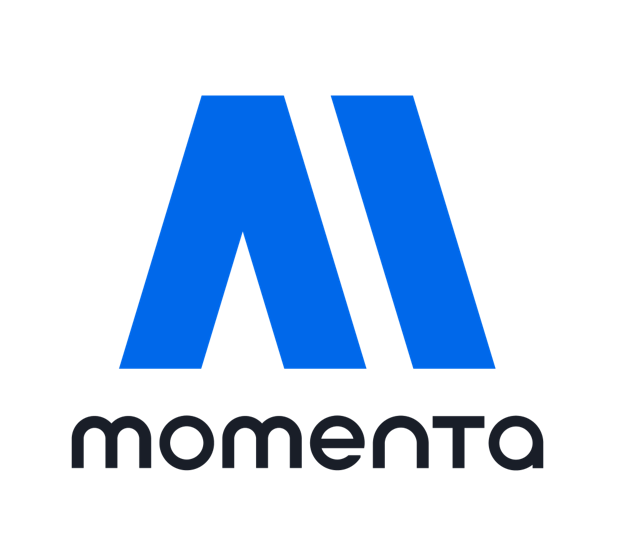

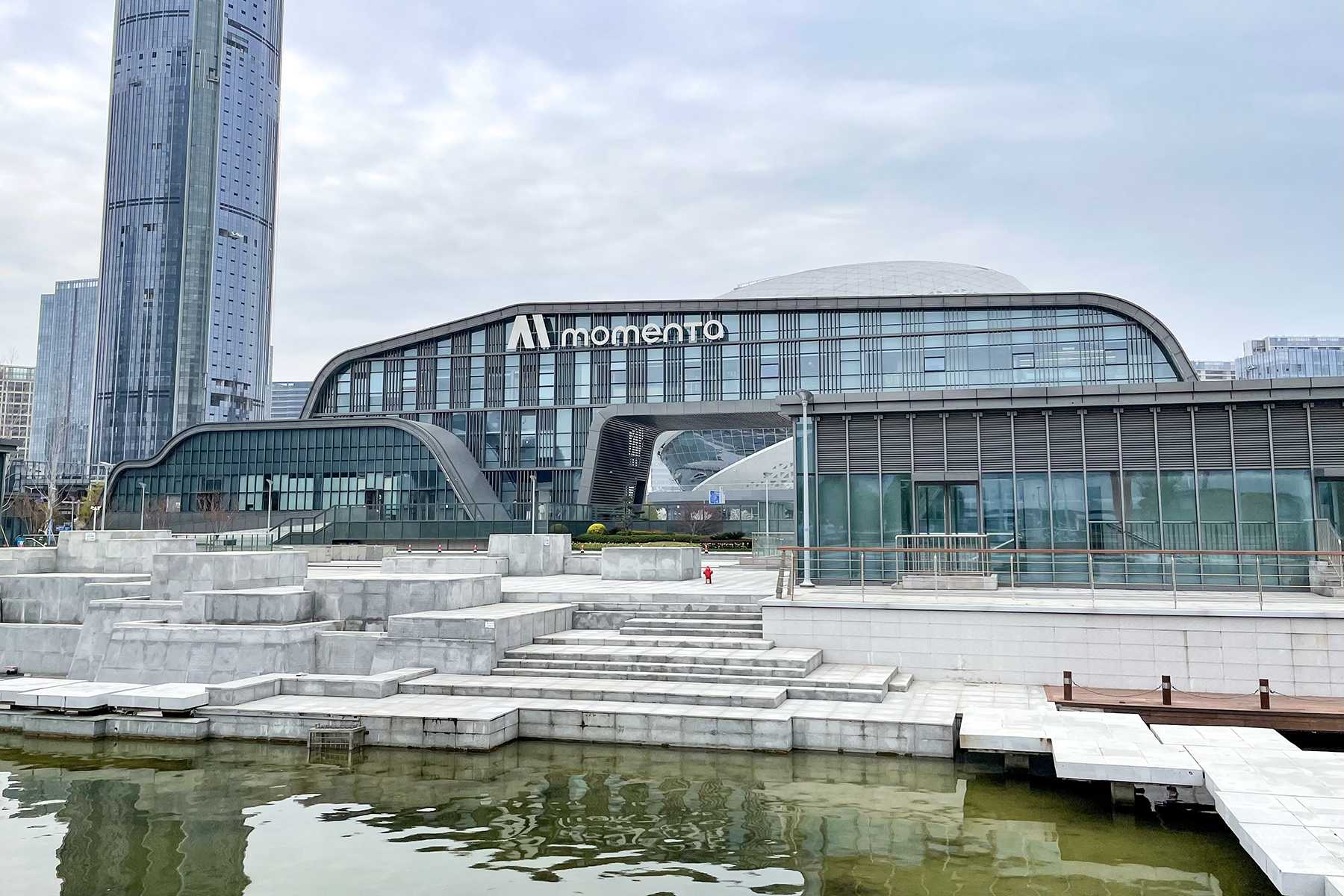
- Headquarters in Suzhou
- Traded as: SEHK: 6880
- Industry: Self-driving cars
- Founded: September 2016; 10 years ago
- Founders: Cao Xudong (CEO)
- Headquarters: Beijing and Suzhou, China
- Products: Deep learning software
- Website: www.momenta.ai

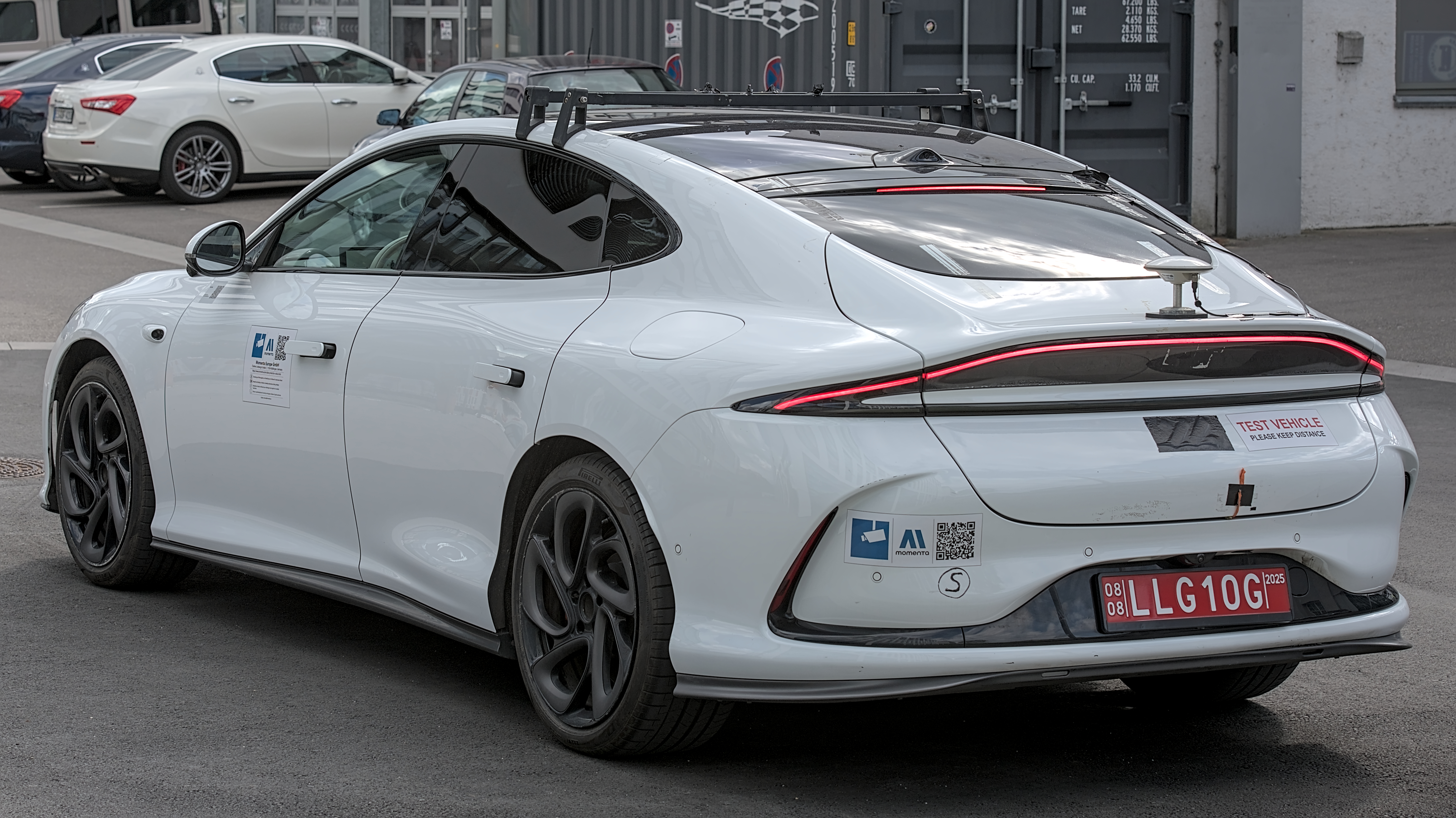
Momenta IM L6-test vehicle in southern Germany, 2025

Momenta Global Limited (shortened to Momenta) is a developer of intelligent driving technologies, based in Beijing and Suzhou, China.

== History ==
Momenta was founded in September 2016 led by Cao Xudong, a former scientist at Microsoft Research and former executive director of research and development at Chinese deep-learning and computer vision company SenseTime.

In 2017, Daimler (now Mercedes-Benz Group) invested in Momenta, the automaker's first investment in a Chinese startup. Momenta became the first Chinese unicorn specializing in self-driving cars after investors valued the company at more than $1 billion in 2021. The investors included, in addition to those already mentioned, General Motors (GM), IDG Capital, GGV Capital, Blue Lake Capital, Shunwei Capital, and Cathay Capital. GM invested $300 million in Momenta, as was announced in 2021, with the aim to accelerate the development of self-driving cars in China. By that time, Momenta struck partnerships with SAIC Motor, Toyota, auto parts supplier Bosch, as well as Daimler, Temasek, Yunfeng Capital, and Tencent.

Since 2021, SAIC Motors and Momenta have worked together on robotaxi operations in Shanghai and Suzhou. In addition to the robotaxis, Momenta is also supplying autonomous driving technology to SAIC's IM who has cars with Momenta tech currently being sold in the United Kingdom.

In December 2021, Momenta and BYD established a joint venture, called DiPi Intelligent Mobility Co, located in Shenzhen, to deploy autonomous driving capabilities across certain BYD car model lines.

In 2023, General Motors China received approval to conduct road tests in Shanghai for its autonomous vehicles developed in collaboration with Momenta.

In 2024, additional partnerships with Nvidia and Qualcomm followed. Mercedes has a partnership with Momenta since 2024, too. In August 2024, Audi and SAIC Motor announced a joint venture in which Momenta is contributing a system for autonomous driving. In November 2024, Momenta announced partnerships with Nissan and Honda to develop advanced intelligent driving solutions based on an end-to-end intelligent driving large model.

In September 2024, Momenta introduced its first end-to-end self-driving model intended for mass production.

In July 2025, BMW and Momenta formed a cooperation. This cooperation includes Momenta providing driver assistance systems for BMW's entire new model lineup in China. In September 2025, Momenta announced that it would enter into a strategic Advanced Driver Assistance Systems (ADAS) partnership with French auto component manufacturer Valeo. The company also announced a partnership with Uber to test Robotaxis, in Germany starting in 2026. Additionally, Mercedes-Benz announced Momenta would be equipping their fully electric CLA model with a driver assistance system, which would be on Chinese streets starting in autumn 2025.

In December 2025, Momenta partnered with Mercedes-Benz Group to deploy self-driving cars for Lumo Mobility in Abu Dhabi.

On 18 December 2025, Momenta announced that it would be entering into a strategic partnership with Grab to bring autonomous driving technology to Southeast Asia.

On 8 July 2026, Momenta debuted on the Hong Kong Exchanges and Clearing after raising approximately HK$ 5.89 billion in its IPO.

== Products ==
Momenta does not build cars itself, but sells their car software to automakers. The company works on deep learning capacities, the so-called "brains", of cars. Momenta's software is fed with large amounts of data which are needed in particular for the development of self-driving cars, so that they can achieve end-to-end intelligent driving.

According to Rita Liao in TechCrunch, the company has a "two-legged approach of selling semi-automated software while investing in research for next-gen self-driving tech". In the second half of 2025, Momenta launched the Momenta Flywheel R6 based on reinforcement learning and its first batch of mass-production platform-based driverless robotaxis is expected to start trial operations in China by the end of 2025.

According to Automotive World, "More than 160 OEM vehicle programs from leading global automakers are already committed to Momenta, with over 40 production models delivered and on the road."

Brands and vehicles supplied by Momenta
	Manufacturers	Brands	Vehicles
Strategic investors	SAIC	IM	All models
Strategic investors	SAIC	MG	07
Strategic investors	SAIC	Roewe	Jiayue 07
Strategic investors	SAIC-GM	Buick	Electra L7, Electra Encasa, Electra E7
Strategic investors	SAIC-GM	Cadillac	Vistiq, XT5(2nd gen)
Strategic investors	SAIC-VW	AUDI	All models
Strategic investors	SAIC-VW	Volkswagen	ID. Era 9X, ID. Era 8X, ID. Era 5X
Strategic investors	Beijing Benz	Mercedes-Benz	CLA (3rd gen), GLC Electric, GLE (4th gen)
Strategic investors	Mercedes-Benz Group	Mercedes-Benz	S-Class
Strategic investors	GAC Toyota	Toyota	bZ3X, bZ7
Strategic investors	FAW Toyota	Toyota	bZ5
Suppliers	BYD	Yangwang	U9, U8
Suppliers	BYD	Denza	Z9, D9, N9, N8L
Suppliers	BYD	BYD	Han, Tang, Song L EV, Sealion 07 EV, Seal
Suppliers	Dongfeng Nissan	Nissan	NX8, N7, N6
Suppliers	GAC	Hyptec	HL, S600, GT
Suppliers	GAC	Aion	Aion V (2nd gen)
Suppliers	GAC	Trumpchi	Xiangwang S7, Xiangwang M8, Xiangwang E8
Suppliers	Chery		Fulwin A9L, T11, Tiggo 8 Plus(2nd gen)
Suppliers	BMW Brilliance	BMW	iX3, X5
Suppliers	FAW	Hongqi	HS6 PHEV
Suppliers	Beijing Hyundai	Hyundai	Ioniq V
Suppliers	Dongfeng	eπ	
Suppliers	Dongfeng Honda	Honda	
Suppliers	GAC Honda	Honda	

== See also ==
- Yinwang (Huawei's autonomous driving solution company)
- Qianli Technology (Geely's autonomous driving solution company)
- Zhuoyu Technology (FAW and DJI's autonomous driving solution company)
- DeepRoute.ai (autonomous driving solution company backed by GWM)
- Horizon Robotics (Chinese autonomous driving solution company)
