= Roewe Jiayue 07 =

Mid-size crossover SUV

Overview
- Manufacturer: Roewe (SAIC Motor)
- Production: 2026–present
- Assembly: China: Pukou, Nanjing
- Designer: Jozef Kabaň

Body and chassis
- Class: Mid-size crossover SUV
- Body style: 5-door SUV
- Layout: Front-engine, rear-motor, rear-wheel drive; Rear-motor, rear-wheel drive
- Related: Roewe Jiayue X7

Powertrain
- Engine: Petrol range extender: 1.5 L 15FMC I4
- Electric motor: 162 kW TZ204XS1351 PMSM; 245 kW PMSM
- Transmission: 1-speed gear reduction
- Hybrid drivetrain: Series hybrid
- Battery: 32.6 kWh LFP CATL; 44.2 kWh LFP Zenergy; 80.6 kWh LFP Zenergy
- Electric range: 180–215 km (112–134 mi) (EREV, WLTP); 220–320 km (137–199 mi) (EREV, CLTC); 651 km (405 mi) (BEV, CLTC)
- Plug-in charging: DC: 121–170 kW (EREV)

Dimensions
- Wheelbase: 2,915 mm (114.8 in)
- Length: 4,900 mm (192.9 in)
- Width: 1,910 mm (75.2 in)
- Height: 1,745–1,753 mm (68.7–69.0 in)
- Curb weight: 1,935–2,120 kg (4,266–4,674 lb)

The Roewe Jiayue 07 (Chinese: 家越07) is a mid-size crossover SUV produced by SAIC Motor under the Roewe brand.

== Overview ==
The Jiayue 07 was first previewed by the Roewe Jiayue 07 Concept during the brand's 20th anniversary celebration in April 2026. The concept car was later unveiled to the public at the 2026 Beijing Auto Show in April 2026. Pre-sales opened on 21 September 2026 and the car launched the following month on 23 October. The battery electric version opened for pre-orders on 20 November 2026 and will be launched on 27 November at the 2026 Guangzhou Auto Show.

The design of the Jiayue 07 follows Roewe's “Uplifting Aesthetics” philosophy It is distinguished by a tall and clean front end with three U-shaped DRL on each side of the slim headlamp. At the rear, the taillights echoes the front with three U-shaped position lamps on each side of the slim tail lamp. In terms of tech, the Jiayue 07 features ByteDance’s Volcano Engine Doubao large AI model series 2.0.

Rear view

Interior

The Jiayue 07 uses MacPherson strut front and five-link independent rear suspension geometries, and is equipped with standard magnetorheological adaptive dampers. Roewe says 84% of the chassis consists of high-strength steel or aluminium. It has a turning radius of 5.47 metres (17.9 ft).

The interior features an 8.88-inch digitial instrument cluster integrated into the dashboard along with a 15.6-inch 2.5K-resolution central infotainment touchscreen, powered by a Snapdragon 8295P chip. The rear passengers have access to an optional 15.6-inch 2.5K-resolution roof-mounted power-folding passenger entertainment display. The vehicle is equipped with a 20-speaker 7.1.4.2 surround sound system featuring 2 speakers integrated into the driver's seat headrest.

The front seats have access to a 'zero-gravity' recline mode with extending legrests, along with heating, ventilation, and 16-point massage functions. The rear seats are equipped with power backrest adjustment and heating and ventilation functions, and have access to seatback folding tables. The center console features a refrigerator and heating compartment which utilizes both compressor and Peltier cooling to achieve a temperature range of −6–50 °C (21–122 °F).

It has a rear cargo capacity of 834 litres (29.5 cu ft) with a 81-litre (2.9 cu ft) underfloor storage compartment, expanding to 2,174 litres (76.8 cu ft) with the seats folded down. Electric variants have a 212-litre (7.5 cu ft) power frunk.

The Jiayue is equipped with two different ADAS systems. The standard system uses a sensor suite consisting of 3 mmWave radars, 5 cameras, and 12 ultrasonic sensors and is powered by a Horizon Robotics J6B chip. Higher models are equipped with the Momenta R7 world model, and use a sensor suite consisting of one roof-mounted LiDAR, 3 mmWave radars, 11 cameras, and 12 ultrasonic sensors, and is powered by the XHeart X7 (Chinese: 新芯航途X7; pinyin: xīnxīn hángtú X7), and is capable of supervised Level 2 autonomous driving in highway and urban conditions.

== Powertrain ==
The powertrain of the Jiayue 07 is an extended-range hybrid system featuring a SAIC produced 1.5-liter range-extender engine outputting 70 kW (94 hp; 95 PS) (72 kW (97 hp; 98 PS) gross) at 5,300 rpm and 130 N⋅m (96 lb⋅ft) of torque at 4,500 rpm. The rear positioned electric motor produces 60 kW sustained and a peak power of 162 kW (217 hp; 220 PS) and 350 N⋅m (258 lb⋅ft) of torque. The Jiayue 07 is available with either a 32.6 kWh LFP battery pack supplied by CATL providing of 220 km (137 mi) CLTC electric range or a 44.2 kWh lithium iron phosphate (LFP) battery pack manufactured by Nanjing Automobile Group Co., Ltd., with cells supplied by Jiangsu Zhengli New Energy Battery Technology Co., Ltd. (Zenergy) supporting a maximum pure electric CLTC range of 320 km (199 mi), and it uses a 400-volt platform.

The battery electric variant uses a silicon carbide 800-volt architecture. It uses a rear motor outputting 328 hp (245 kW; 333 PS) and 430 N⋅m (317 lb⋅ft) of torque, allowing for a 0–100 km/h (62 mph) acceleration time of 5.9 seconds. It is equipped with a 80.6 kWh LFP battery pack supplied by Zenergy providing 651 kilometres (405 mi) of CLTC range.

Specifications
Battery		Engine	Motor		Electric range		DC charging		Top speed	Kerb weight
Type	Weight	Engine	Power	Torque	WLTP	CLTC	Peak	30–80%	Top speed	Kerb weight
32.6 kWh LFP CATL	250 kg (551 lb)	1.5 L 15FMC I4; 94 hp (70 kW; 95 PS)	217 hp (162 kW; 220 PS)	350 N⋅m (258 lb⋅ft)	183 km (114 mi)	220 km (137 mi)	121 kW	17 min	180 km/h (112 mph)	1,935–1,965 kg (4,266–4,332 lb)
44.2 kWh LFP Zenergy	295–315 kg (650–694 lb)	1.5 L 15FMC I4; 94 hp (70 kW; 95 PS)	217 hp (162 kW; 220 PS)	350 N⋅m (258 lb⋅ft)	240 km (149 mi)	320 km (199 mi)	170 kW	15 min	180 km/h (112 mph)	2,040–2,075 kg (4,497–4,575 lb)
80.6 kWh LFP Zenergy	552 kg (1,217 lb)		328 hp (245 kW; 333 PS)	430 N⋅m (317 lb⋅ft)		651 km (405 mi)			200 km/h (124 mph)	2,075–2,120 kg (4,575–4,674 lb)

== Sales ==
Since pre-sales for the Jiayue 07 opened on 21 September 2026, the car received 10,000 refundable deposits within one hour, 20,000 within 48 hours, and 40,000 by 23 October. The Jiayue 07 received 10,000 firm orders within 1 minute and 53 seconds after orders opened on 24 October 2026.
