= DeepRoute.ai =

Chinese autonomous driving company

- Trade name: 元戎启行
- Type: Private
- Industry: Autonomous vehicles Artificial intelligence
- Founded: 2019; 7 years ago
- Founder: Zhou Guang
- Headquarters: Shenzhen, China
- Products: Autonomous driving systems
- Website: www.deeproute.ai

DeepRoute.ai (Chinese: 元戎启行) is a Chinese autonomous driving company founded in 2019 and headquartered in Shenzhen, China. The company develops full-stack self-driving solutions including perception, decision-making, and control systems.

== History ==
DeepRoute.ai was founded in February 2019 in Shenzhen, China, by Zhou Guang (周光), who serves as the company's CEO.

In September 2019, the company collaborated with Dongfeng for a live-streamed autonomous driving demonstration.

In October 2019, during the 7th Military World Games, DeepRoute.ai conducted Robotaxi demonstration operations.

In November 2019, it obtained an intelligent connected vehicle road test permit for public roads in Shenzhen.

In October 2020, DeepRoute.ai signed an "Autonomous Driving Leadership Project" with Dongfeng to build one of China's largest autonomous fleets.

In August 2020, DeepRoute.ai announced its partnership with Cao Cao Mobility, a Geely-backed ride-hailing company, to test robotaxis in Hangzhou for daily operations, planning to provide robotaxis during the 2022 Asian Games.

In September 2021, DeepRoute.ai secured US$300 million in a Series B funding round led by Alibaba.

In December 2021, the company unveiled its DeepRoute-Driver 2.0, an L4-level autonomous driving solution comprising five solid-state lidar sensors, eight cameras, a proprietary computing system and an optional millimeter-wave radar. with a production cost of under US$10,000.

In June 2022, it partnered with Deppon Express to provide autonomous light truck freight transfer services.

In March 2023, the company launched its high-precision map-free intelligent driving solution, DeepRoute-Driver 3.0.

In November 2024, Great Wall Motor announced a $100 million Series C funding round for Deeproute. With this, Deeproute has completed five rounds of financing, raising a cumulative total of over $500 million. Its shareholders include Fosun RZ Capital, Yunqi Partners, Alibaba, Vision Plus Capital, and Dongfeng, among others. In the same month, Deeproute.ai emphasised that they were in "deep cooperation" with Nvidia and spoke on being part of the first batch of companies in China to get a hold of Nvidia's newer Thor chip for cars which will be used in a new system released next year. This new system will help manage more complex driving scenarios through visual cues.

== Products ==
=== VLA Model ===
VLA Model is a Vision–language–action model designed for autonomous driving systems. It integrates visual perception, semantic understanding, and action decision-making into a unified framework, aiming to enhance the safety and adaptability of advanced driver-assistance systems (ADAS) in complex road environments. The model was officially launched on August 26, 2025, as the core of DeepRoute.ai's DeepRoute IO 2.0 platform.

The VLA model is characterized by its "visual-language-action" architecture, which incorporates a chain-of-thought (CoT) reasoning capability inspired by large language models. This design is intended to address the "black box" limitations of traditional end-to-end autonomous driving systems by enabling the model to analyze information, infer causality, and make decisions in a more transparent and interpretable manner.

=== Appliance ===
The company has partnered with several automakers including Dongfeng Motor Corporation and Geely to develop and test autonomous vehicles.

Brands and vehicles supplied by DeepRoute.ai
Manufacturers	Brands	Vehicles
GWM	Wey	Lanshan, Gaoshan
GWM	Tank	400, 500, 700
Geely	smart	#5
Geely	Geely Galaxy	M9 (co-developed with Qianli)

== See also ==
- Yinwang (Huawei's autonomous driving solution company)
- Momenta (autonomous driving solution company backed by SAIC, GM, and Toyota)
- Qianli Technology (Geely's autonomous driving solution company)
- Zhuoyu Technology (FAW and DJI's autonomous driving solution company)
- Horizon Robotics (Chinese autonomous driving solution company)
