= Qianli Technology =

Chinese technology company

Chongqing Qianli Technology Co., Ltd.
- Native name: 重庆千里科技股份有限公司
- Formerly: Lifan Technology (Group) Co., Ltd. 力帆科技（集团）股份有限公司
- Company type: Public
- Industry: Automotive, Technology
- Founded: 2015; 11 years ago
- Headquarters: Chongqing, China
- Key people: Yin Qi (Chairman); Wang Jun (Co-President)
- Products: Intelligent driving solutions, Smart cockpits, New energy vehicles, Inertial navigation systems
- Subsidiaries: Livan Automotive (55%)
- Website: https://qianli-ai.com

Chongqing Qianli Technology Co., Ltd. (Chinese: 重庆千里科技股份有限公司), also trading as Afari is a Chinese technology company specializing in the integration of artificial intelligence (AI) and automotive technologies. Headquartered in Chongqing, the company is focused on developing intelligent driving solutions, smart cockpits, and new energy vehicles (NEVs). It is formerly known as Lifan Technology (Group) Co., Ltd. (力帆科技（集团）股份有限公司).

== History ==
=== Early Years as Lifan Group (1992–2020) ===
The company originated as Chongqing Lifan Group, founded in 1992 by Yin Mingshan. Initially a manufacturer of motorcycle engines, it grew into a major private enterprise producing motorcycles, cars, and engines. However, due to financial struggles, the company filed for bankruptcy restructuring in 2020.

=== Restructuring and Involvement of Geely (2021–2023) ===
In 2021, following court-led restructuring, a consortium led by the Chongqing Liangjiang New Area and Geely acquired a controlling stake. It was renamed Lifan Technology (Group) Co., Ltd., shifting toward electric mobility. Under Geely's influence, Lifan Technology launched electric vehicle brands such as Maple and Livan.

=== Strategic Pivot to "AI + Auto" and Rebranding to Qianli (2024–Present) ===
In 2024, Yin Qi, co-founder of the AI giant Megvii, acquired a significant stake and was appointed Chairman. The company adopted an "AI + Auto" strategy, rebranding to Chongqing Qianli Technology Co., Ltd.

In September 2025, Qianli Technology announced that Lifan Holdings transferred a total of 135.6 million shares of the company (accounting for 3.00% of the company's total shares) to Mercedes-Benz Digital Technology at a price of RMB 1.34 billion. Upon completion of the transaction, Mercedes-Benz will become the fifth largest shareholder of Qianli Technology.

In September 2025, Qianli Technology announced the company's English name "Afari".

In January 2026, at CES 2026, Qianli Technology and Geely jointly announced the global launch of the assisted driving brand—G-ASD (Geely Afari Smart Driving, Qianli Haohan).

== Products ==
Qianli Technology's business model is combining traditional vehicle manufacturing and technology solutions like intelligent driving systems and AI platforms.

=== G-ASD (Qianli Haohan) autonomous driving system ===
In 2025, Geely launched its unified intelligent driving solution—"Qianli Haohan"—announcing that all future models under the group will be equipped with the system. Based on hardware tiers, the Haohan system is divided into five levels: H1, H3, H5, H7, and H9. Depending on the levels, it offers varying levels of automated navigation and automated parking capabilities.

- NOA (Navigation on Autopilot): Automated driving assistance on highways or urban roads based on navigation routes.
- D2D (Door to Door): End-to-end automated driving from the starting point to the final destination.
- APA (Automated Parking Assist): System that automatically steers the vehicle into a parking space, with the driver typically controlling acceleration and braking.
- HPA (Home-zone Parking Assist): Automated parking function that memorizes and replicates a frequently used parking route, often for a home or office garage.
- VPD (Virtual Parking Driver): A system that can automatically navigate and park the vehicle in complex parking scenarios, often using more advanced sensors and planning.

G-ASD autonomous driving solution
Level	Hardware			Function							Applied vehicles
Level	camera	radar	Lidar	NOA				Parking			Applied vehicles
Level	camera	radar	Lidar	Highway NOA	Urban NOA	Urban map-free NOA	D2D	APA	HPA	VPD	Applied vehicles
H1	10	5	-	✔				✔			Geely Galaxy E8, Geely Galaxy Starshine 8
H3	11	3	-	✔	✔				✔		Lynk & Co 03, Geely Galaxy A7
H5	11	3	1	✔		✔			✔		Geely Galaxy M9 (co-developed with DeepRoute.ai), Lynk & Co 07, Lynk & Co 08
H7	11	3	1	✔		✔	✔			✔	Lynk & Co 900, Lynk & Co 07, Lynk & Co 08, Zeekr 001
H9	11	5	5	✔		✔	✔			✔	Zeekr 9X, Zeekr 8X

=== Vehicle manufacturing ===
Livan Automotive (Chinese: 睿蓝汽车; pinyin: Ruìlán Qìchē) is a joint venture company between Qianli and Geely Qizheng, a company owned by Zhejiang Geely Holding (ZGH). The brand was founded in 2022 following a merger between Geely-owned Maple and Lifan Technology.

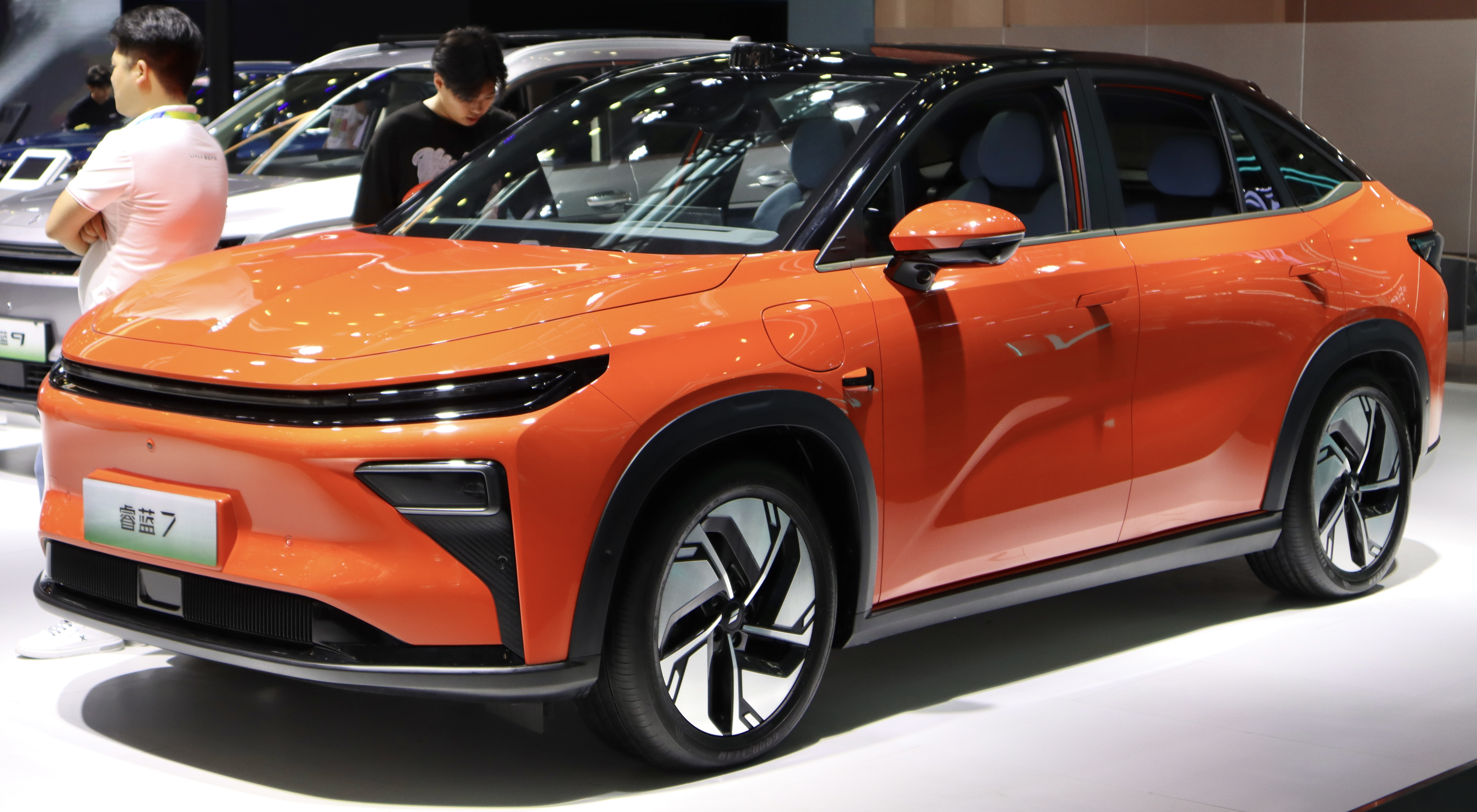
Livan 7

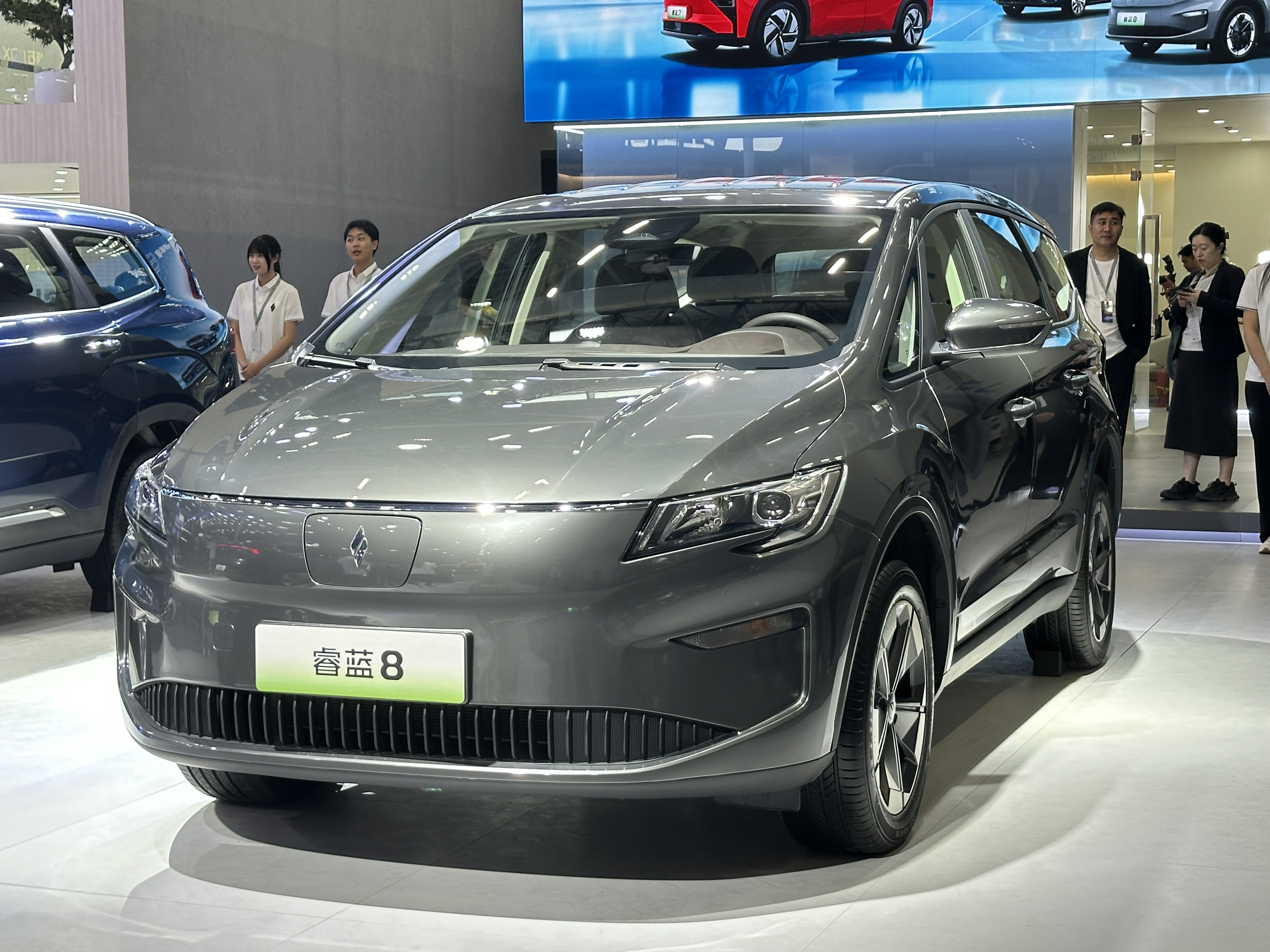
Livan 8

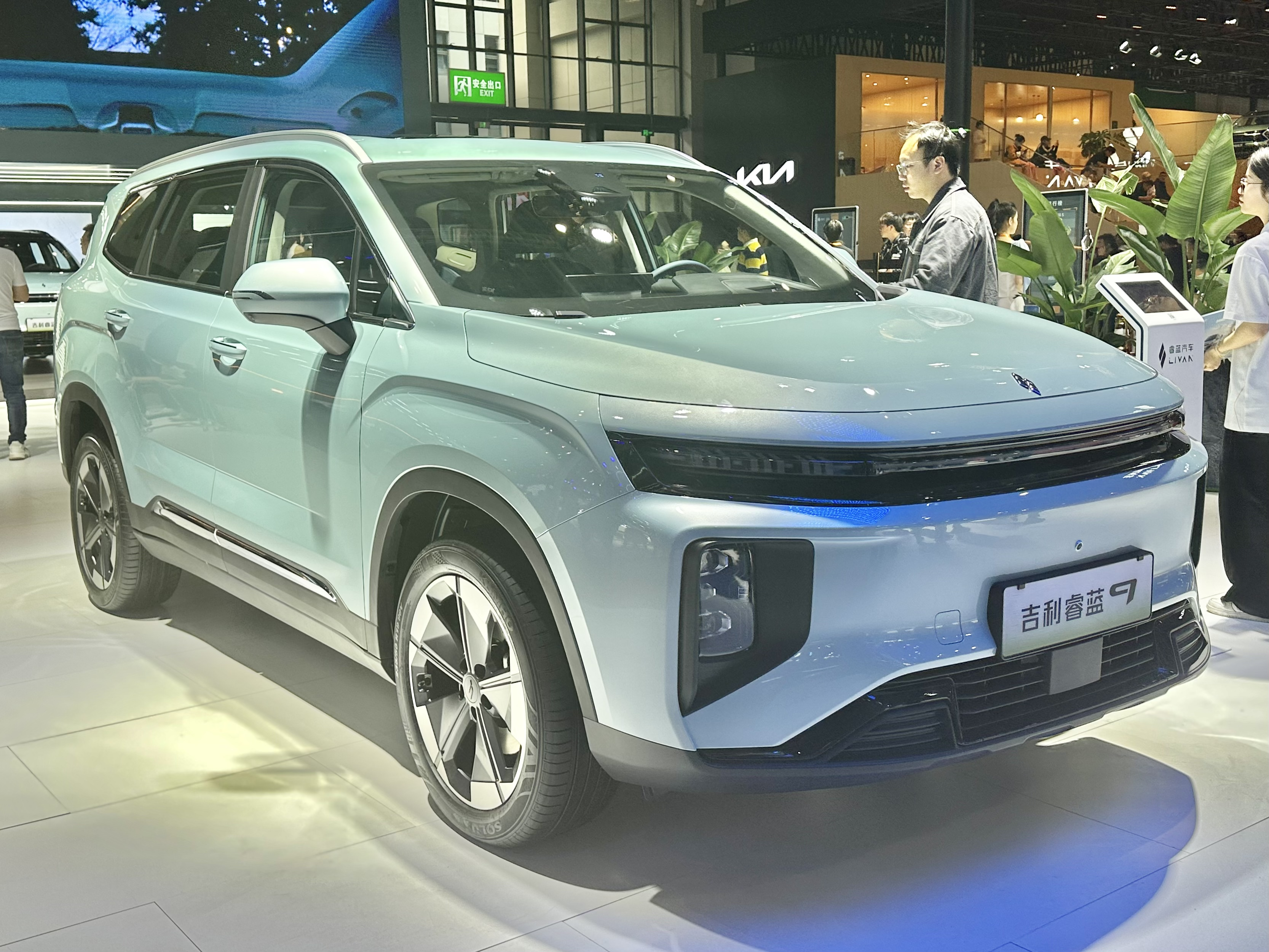
Livan 9

== Shareholders ==
As of 2025, major shareholders include:

- Man Jianghong Fund (consortium backed by Geely and Chongqing government)
- Jianghe Shunsui (controlled by Yin Qi)
- Geely Holding Group
- Mercedes-Benz (Shanghai) Digital Technology Co., Ltd.

== See also ==
- Geely Holding Group
- Livan Automotive
- Yinwang (Huawei's autonomous driving solution company)
- Momenta (autonomous driving solution company backed by SAIC, GM, and Toyota)
- Zhuoyu Technology (FAW and DJI's autonomous driving solution company)
- DeepRoute.ai (autonomous driving solution company backed by GWM)
- Horizon Robotics (Chinese autonomous driving solution company)
