= Black Sesame Technologies =

Chinese AI chip company

Black Sesame International Holding Limited
- Native name: 黑芝麻智能国际控股有限公司
- Company type: Public
- Traded as: SEHK: 2533
- Industry: Artificial intelligence Semiconductors
- Founded: 15 July 2016; 9 years ago
- Founders: Shan Jizhang; Liu Weihong
- Headquarters: Wuhan, Hubei, China
- Key people: Shan Jizhang (Chairman & CEO); Liu Weihong (President)
- Revenue: ▲CN¥474.25 million (2024)
- Net income: ▲CN¥313.32 million (2023)
- Total assets: ▲CN¥2.32 billion (2024)
- Total equity: ▲CN¥1.09 billion (2023)
- Number of employees: 973 (2024)
- Website: www.blacksesame.com.cn

Black Sesame Technologies (BST; Chinese: 黑芝麻智能科技; pinyin: Hēi Zhīma Zhìnéng Kējì) is a Chinese technology company headquartered in Wuhan. The company develops artificial intelligence (AI) chips used in self-driving cars and advanced driver assistance systems (ADAS).

== Background ==
In 2016, BST was founded by Shan Jizhang and Liu Weihong. Shan had spent almost two decades working for OmniVision Technologies while Liu worked in the automotive industry for companies such as General Motors and Bosch.

BST backers have included Tencent, Xiaomi, Geely, NIO, SK Group and Northern Light Venture Capital.

In 2020, BST started generating revenue where it reported 165.4 million yuan in revenue for the year.

At the end of March 2023, the Hong Kong Stock Exchange (HKSE) introduced the Chapter 18C rule which allowed early stage specialist technology companies with little to no revenue to list. In July 2023, BST used this rule to apply for a listing. According to its prospectus, BST had a market share of 2.2% which made it a small player compared to lager peers such as Mobileye, Nvidia, Texas Instruments and Horizon Robotics. BST did not have promising financials with a net loss in 2023 of 4.86 billion yuan which was 76% higher than the previous year. However it was considered a strategic player in China's plans for a domestic chip industry. The listing came at a time where the Biden administration was proposing rules that would bar Chinese software in high level autonomous cars in the U.S.

On 8 August 2024, BST held its initial public offering (IPO) becoming a listed company on the HKSE. The pricing had been set at the lowest end and it was 2.5 times oversubscribed by retail investors and 1.1 times by global funds. The trading debut was dismal with shares opening at HK$18.80, down 33% from the IPO price of HK$28 and ended the day at HK$20.45. The IPO raised HK$950 million. BST was the second company in the exchange's history to use the Chapter 18C rule to list.

== Business operations ==
Black Sesame offers products enabling autonomous driving, such as SoCs and algorithm-based solutions. According to Frost & Sullivan, in 2023 it was the world's third-largest provider for automotive-grade high computing power SoCs.

BST fully relies on TSMC for its production of its SoCs and TSMC has stated it currently supplies 7nm chips via its Taiwan factory. BST has stated while being a client to TSMC is a selling point, having full dependence on it is a key risk.

Customers include Baidu, Geely, Dongfeng Motor Corporation and Bosch.

== See also ==
- Horizon Robotics
- Self-driving car
- Semiconductor industry in China
