= Yinwang =

Auto Company

Shenzhen Yinwang Intelligent Technology Co., Ltd.
- Native name: 深圳引望智能技术有限公司
- Formerly: Huawei Intelligent Automotive Solution
- Type: Subsidiary
- Industry: Automotive
- Founded: 2019; 7 years ago as Huawei's automobile Business Unit; 2024; 2 years ago as an independent company Yinwang
- Headquarters: Shenzhen, China
- Products: Automotive parts and module
- Brands: Qiankun; Harmony Cockpit
- Owner: Huawei (80%); Avatr Technology (10%); Seres Group (10%)
- Number of employees: 7,000
- Website: auto.huawei.com/cn/

Shenzhen Yinwang Intelligent Technology Co., Ltd, (Chinese: 深圳引望智能技术有限公司) trading as "Yinwang", is a company of Huawei which specialized in providing parts and hardware and software solutions for automotive manufacturers. The company was formerly known as Huawei Intelligent Automotive Solution (HIAS, Chinese: 华为智能汽车解决方案), the automobile business unit of Huawei.

== History ==
In April 2019 at the Shanghai Auto Show, Huawei officially announced the establishment of Huawei Intelligent Automotive Solution, Huawei's business for the automotive industry. According to Huawei, the purpose of establishing the business unit is to sell auto parts and technical solutions to vehicle manufacturers.

In January 2024, Huawei decided to operate the business unit independently and established the fully owned subsidiary, the Shenzhen Yinwang Intelligent Technology Co., Ltd, with a registered initial capital of 1 billion RMB.

In April 2024 during an event ahead of the Beijing auto show, Jin Yuzhi, CEO of Huawei's Intelligent Automotive Solution (IAS) business unit, announced its first brand, Qiankun (乾崑), to provide self-driving systems involving the driving chassis, audio and driver's seat for auto makers.

In August 2024, Avatr Technology and Seres Group announced that they would invest in Huawei's subsidiary "Yinwang" (Shenzhen Yinwang Intelligent Technology Co., Ltd.), accounting for 10% of the shares respectively, with a price of RMB 11.5 billion. With the announcement of the transaction, Yinwang's market valuation reached 115 billion RMB.

In February 2025, SAIC Motor and Huawei signed a cooperation agreement in Shanghai. The two parties will engage in strategic collaboration across various areas, including product definition, production and manufacturing, supply chain management, and sales services, to jointly develop new energy intelligent vehicles.

=== Huawei Inside Plus (HI Plus) ===
In August 2024, with Avatr becoming the first company to invest in Yinwang, the previous "Huawei Inside" (HI) model has been further upgraded to a new "HI Plus" model, enabling Huawei to get more deeply involved in Avatr's product definition. Dongfeng would also applied this upgraded mode.

In March 2025, GAC Group established Huawang Automotive Technology (Guangzhou) Co., Ltd. (trade as Huawang Automotive). The company will collaborate with Huawei to develop an independent high-end automotive brand.

In August 2025, GAC Group stated that Huawang Automobile will collaborate with Huawei's IPD (Integrated Product Development) and IPMS (Integrated Product Marketing and Sales) systems, covering aspects from product definition and marketing to ecosystem services. The sales operations will be handled by a new team within the joint venture company.

In September 2025, Huawei and GAC Group officially launched the Qijing brand (Chinese: 启境) operated by Huawang Automotive.

In September 2025, Dongfeng announced to establish a new joint venture to collaborate with Huawei. The new joint venture will share the brand M-Hero with Dongfeng's subsidiary M-Hero Technology and will be integrated into Huawei's IPD and IPMS systems. Dongfeng and Huawei will engage in comprehensive management collaboration across areas such as development, marketing and sales, a new management mode call HI-Plus leads by Yinwang.

In November 2025, Dongfeng and Huawei officially launched the Yijing brand (Chinese: 奕境).

=== Huawei Inside (HI) ===
In May 2022, Arcfox, a brand of BAIC Group, launched the Alpha S, the first vehicle developed under the Hi Mode.

In March 2024, Yu Chendong, the CEO of Huawei Intelligent Automotive Solution, revealed that Deepal, M-Hero and Voyah would apply the "Huawei Inside" mode for several of their new models. However, in August 2024 when Changan and Dongfeng released the Deepal S07 and Voyah Dreamer which equipped with Huawei's technology solutions, they marketed as "Qiankun Smart Driving" or "Harmony Cockpit" instead of badging with "Huawei Inside" logo.

In November 2024, Dongfeng Nissan and Huawei signed an agreement of cooperation that they would develop the vehicle based on Huawei's Harmony Cockpit under the Huawei Inside (HI) mode. It is the first sino-foreign joint venture to collaborate with Huawei.

In September 2024, GAC Toyota, a manufacturer that previously adopted Huawei components and solutions, has decided to upgrade their collaboration to the HI Mode, with two new models set to be launched in 2027.

== Operation ==
Based on the extent of Huawei's participation, collaboration models between automakers and Huawei are categorized into four types: HIMA, HI Plus Mode, HI Mode, and component and solution supplier mode.

Brands and vehicles supplied by Yinwang
Tier	Manufacturer	Brand	Vehicles	Huawei's participation						
Tier	Manufacturer	Brand	Vehicles	ADS	Lidar	cockpit	powertrain	development	marketing	sales
Tier 1 HIMA	Seres	AITO (until 2026)	All models	Harmony Intelligent Mobility Alliance						
Tier 1 HIMA	BAIC BluePark	Stelato	All models	Harmony Intelligent Mobility Alliance						
Tier 1 HIMA	Chery	Luxeed	All models	Harmony Intelligent Mobility Alliance						
Tier 1 HIMA	JAC	Maextro	All models	Harmony Intelligent Mobility Alliance						
Tier 1 HIMA	SAIC Motor	SAIC	All models	Harmony Intelligent Mobility Alliance						
Tier 2 Huawei Inside Plus (HI Plus)	Changan	Avatr	All models	Yes	Yes	Yes	Yes	Yes	Yes	
Tier 2 Huawei Inside Plus (HI Plus)	Dongfeng	M-Hero (Xiangyang)	X700	Yes	Yes		Yes	Yes	Yes	
Tier 2 Huawei Inside Plus (HI Plus)	Dongfeng	Epicland	All models	Yes	Yes	Yes		Yes	Yes	Yes
Tier 2 Huawei Inside Plus (HI Plus)	GAC	Aistaland	All models	Yes	Yes	Yes		Yes	Yes	Yes
Tier 2 Huawei Inside Plus (HI Plus)	SAIC-GM-Wuling	Huajing	All models	Yes	Yes	Yes		Yes	Yes	
Tier 3 Huawei Inside (HI)	Seres	AITO (since 2026)		Yes	Yes	Yes				
Tier 3 Huawei Inside (HI)	Dongfeng	M-Hero	M817	Yes	Yes	Yes				
Tier 3 Huawei Inside (HI)	Dongfeng	Voyah	All models	Yes	Yes	Yes				
Tier 3 Huawei Inside (HI)	Dongfeng	Dongfeng eπ	All models	Yes	Yes	Yes				
Tier 3 Huawei Inside (HI)	BAIC BluePark	Arcfox	αS6	Yes	Yes	Yes				
Tier 3 Huawei Inside (HI)	Changan	Deepal	S09	Yes	Yes	Yes				
Tier 3 Huawei Inside (HI)	Changan	Deepal	S07, L07	Yes						
Tier 3 Huawei Inside (HI)	GAC	Trumpchi	Xiangwang M8, Xiangwang S9	Yes	Yes	Yes				
Tier 3 Huawei Inside (HI)	GAC	Hyptec	A800	Yes	Yes	Yes				
Tier 3 Huawei Inside (HI)	SAIC-VW	Audi	A5L Sportback	Yes	Yes					
Tier 3 Huawei Inside (HI)	FAW-VW	Audi	A5L, Q5L	Yes	Yes					
Tier 3 Huawei Inside (HI)	Audi-FAW NEV	Audi	Q6L e-tron, Q6L Sportback e-tron, A6L e-tron	Yes	Yes					
Tier 3 Huawei Inside (HI)	BYD	Fangchengbao	Bao 8, Bao 5	Yes	Yes					
Tier 3 Huawei Inside (HI)	Chery	Jetour	Zongheng G700	Yes	Yes					
Tier 3 Huawei Inside (HI)	Chery Jaguar Land Rover	Freelander	8	Yes	Yes					
Tier 4 Standardized parts/solution supply	Dongfeng Nissan	Nissan	Teana (L34)			Yes				
Tier 4 Standardized parts/solution supply	GAC Toyota	Toyota	bZ3X			Yes				
Tier 4 Standardized parts/solution supply	GAC Toyota	Toyota	bZ7			Yes	Yes			
Tier 4 Standardized parts/solution supply	GAC	Trumpchi	E8			Yes				

=== Tier 1 — Harmony Intelligent Mobility Alliance (HIMA) ===
HIMA is an automotive alliance led by Huawei established in 2023, the members of the alliance include AITO (Seres Group), Luxeed (Chery), Stelato (BAIC BluePark), Maextro (JAC Group) and SAIC (SAIC Motor). Under HIMA, Huawei provides a complete set of vehicle solutions and participates in product definition, design, marketing, user experience, quality control and delivery, while the manufacturers are only responsible for vehicle manufacturing.

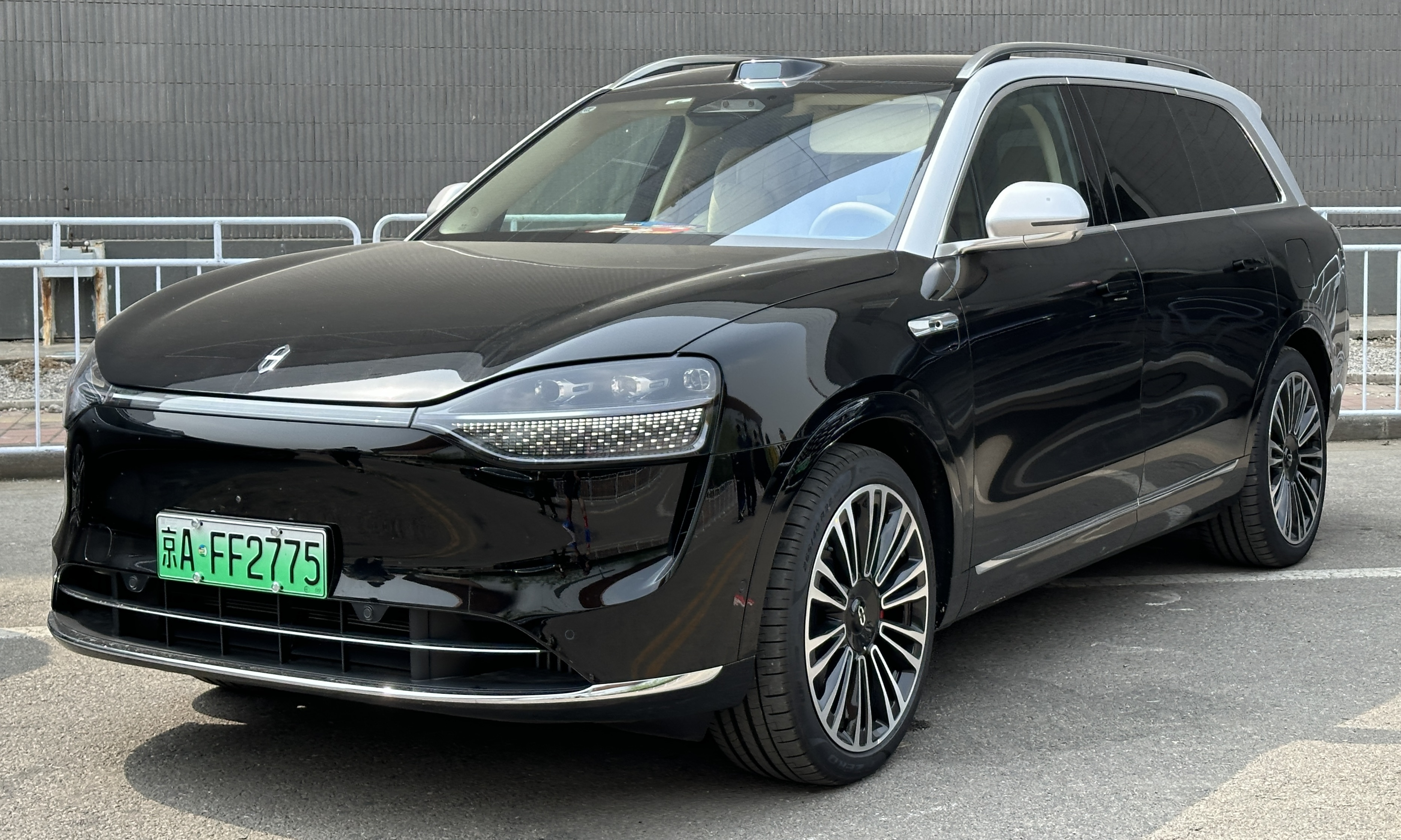
AITO M9

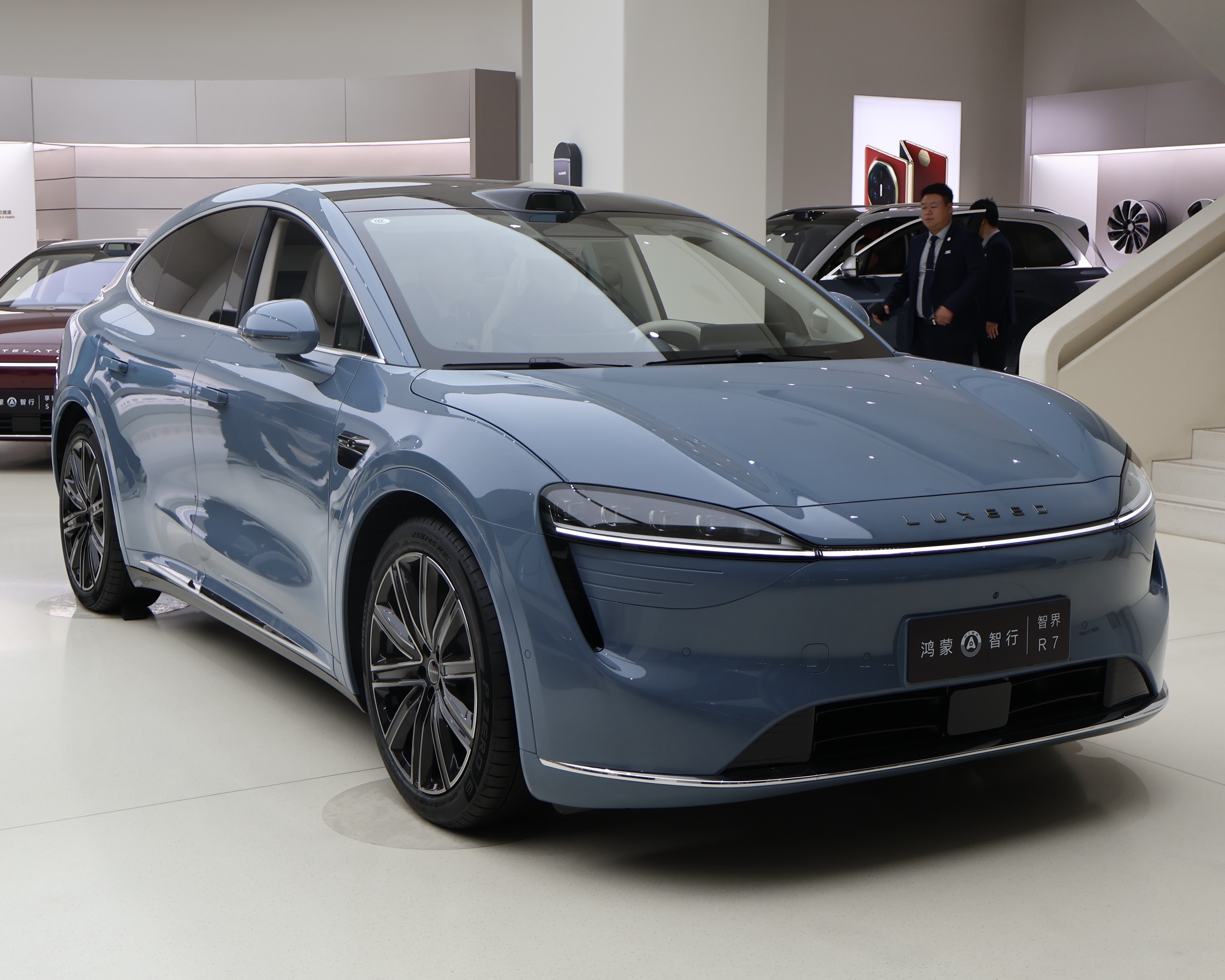
Luxeed R7

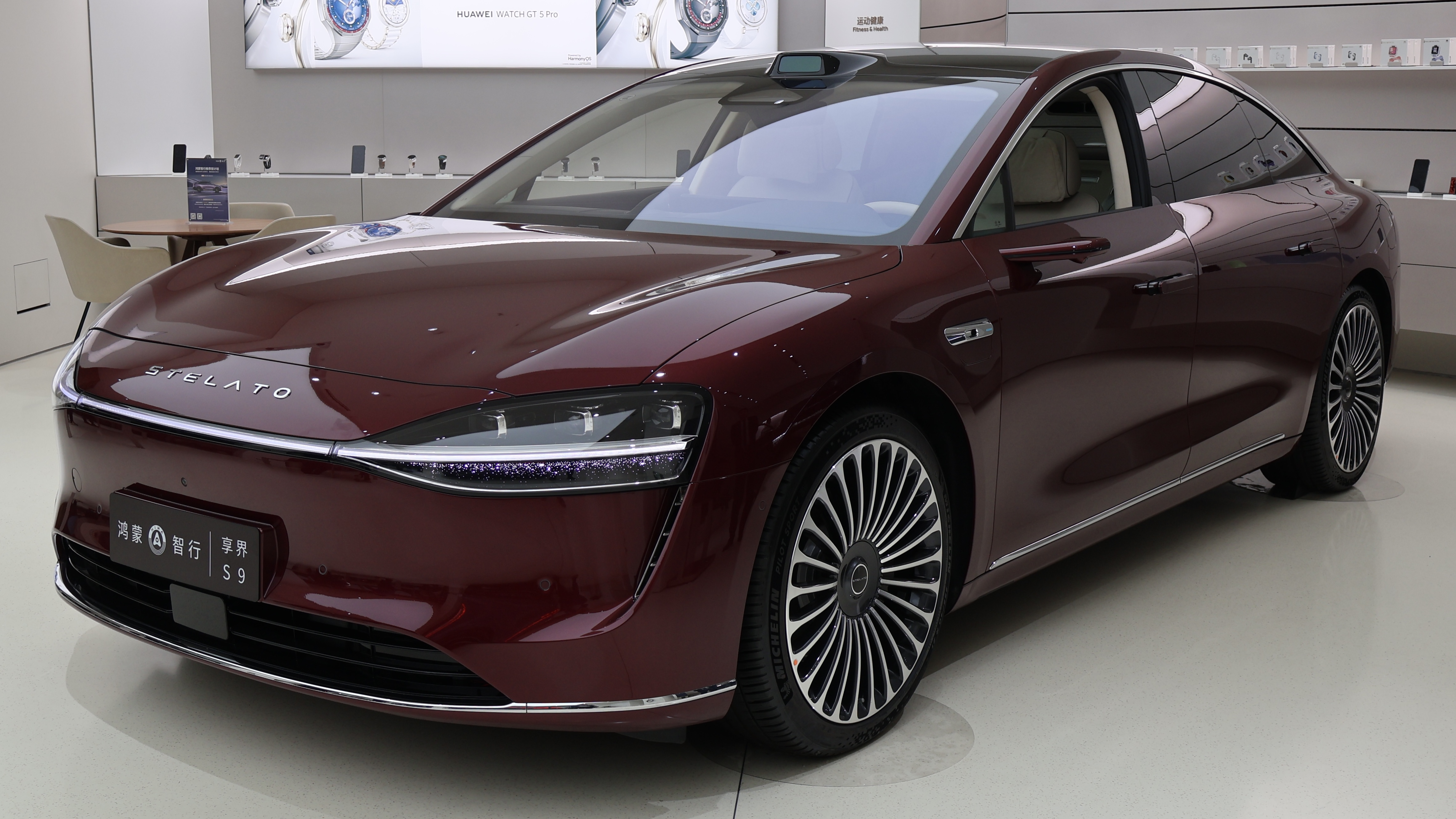
Stelato S9

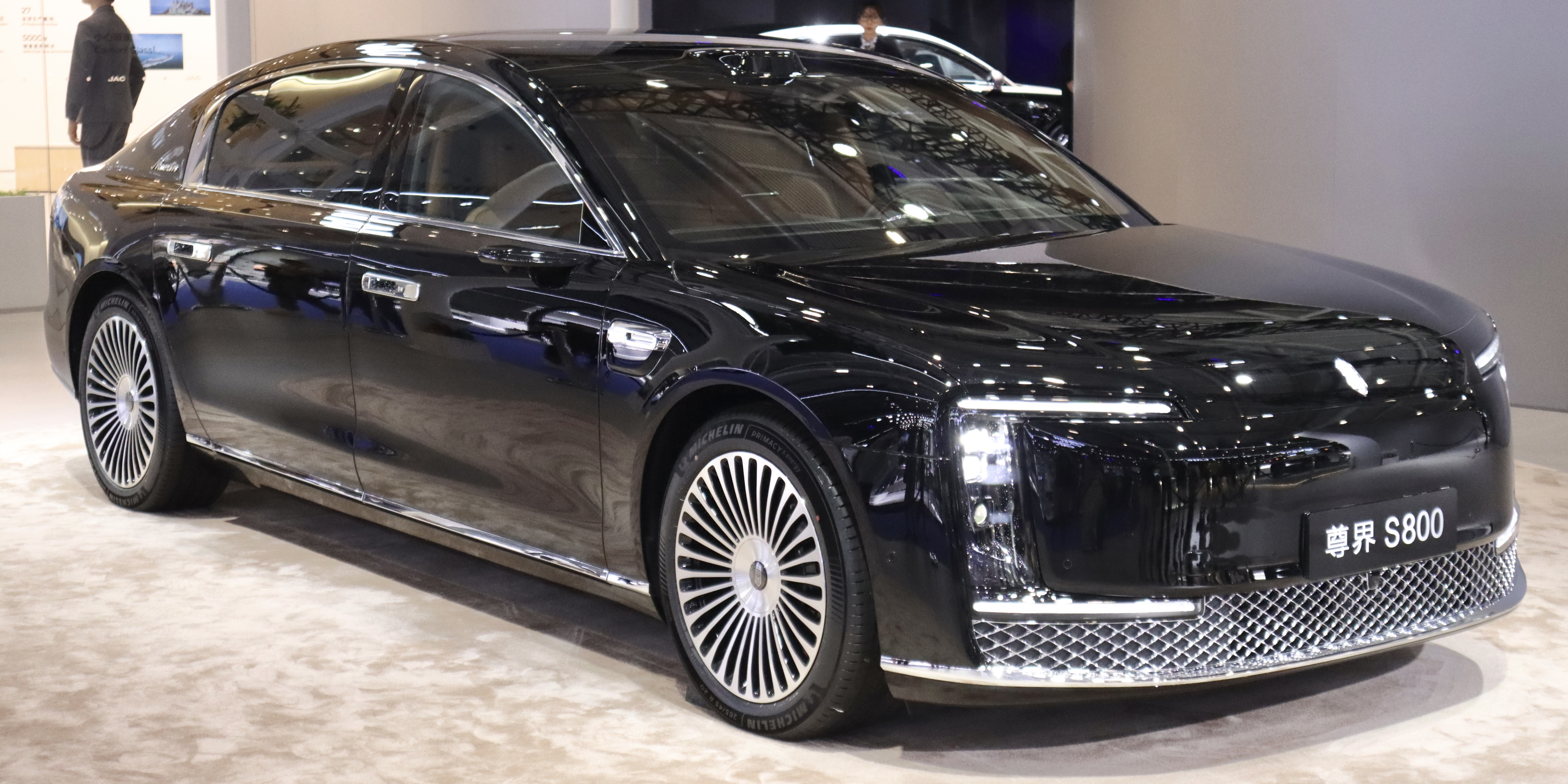
Maextro S800

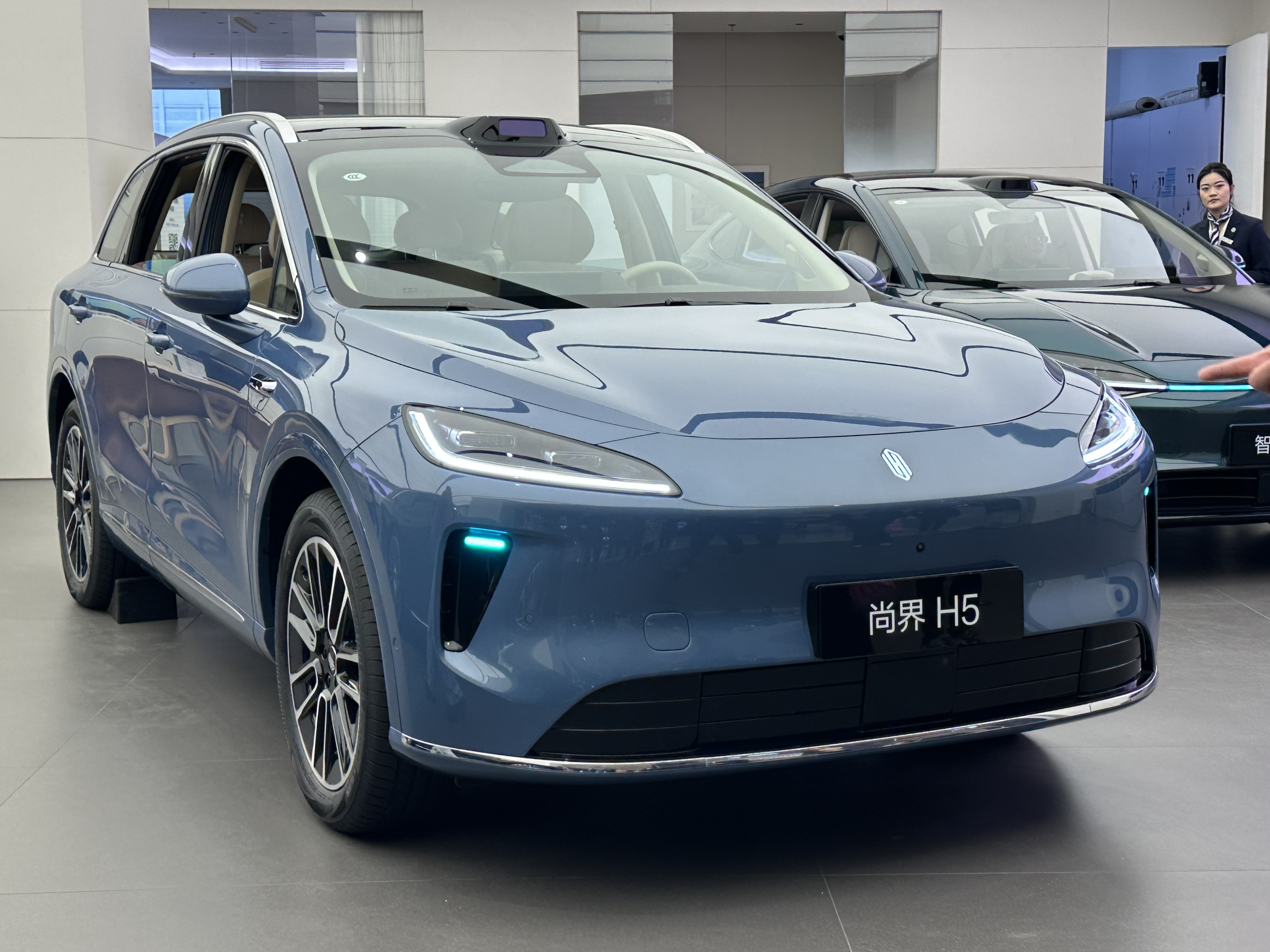
SAIC H5

=== Tier 2 — Huawei Inside Plus (HI Plus) ===
HI Plus Mode (Huawei Inside Plus) is a collaborative model that sits between HIMA and HI Mode. Under this framework, automakers remain the primary party responsible for R&D, product development, and sales, while Huawei participates deeply in key aspects of these processes.

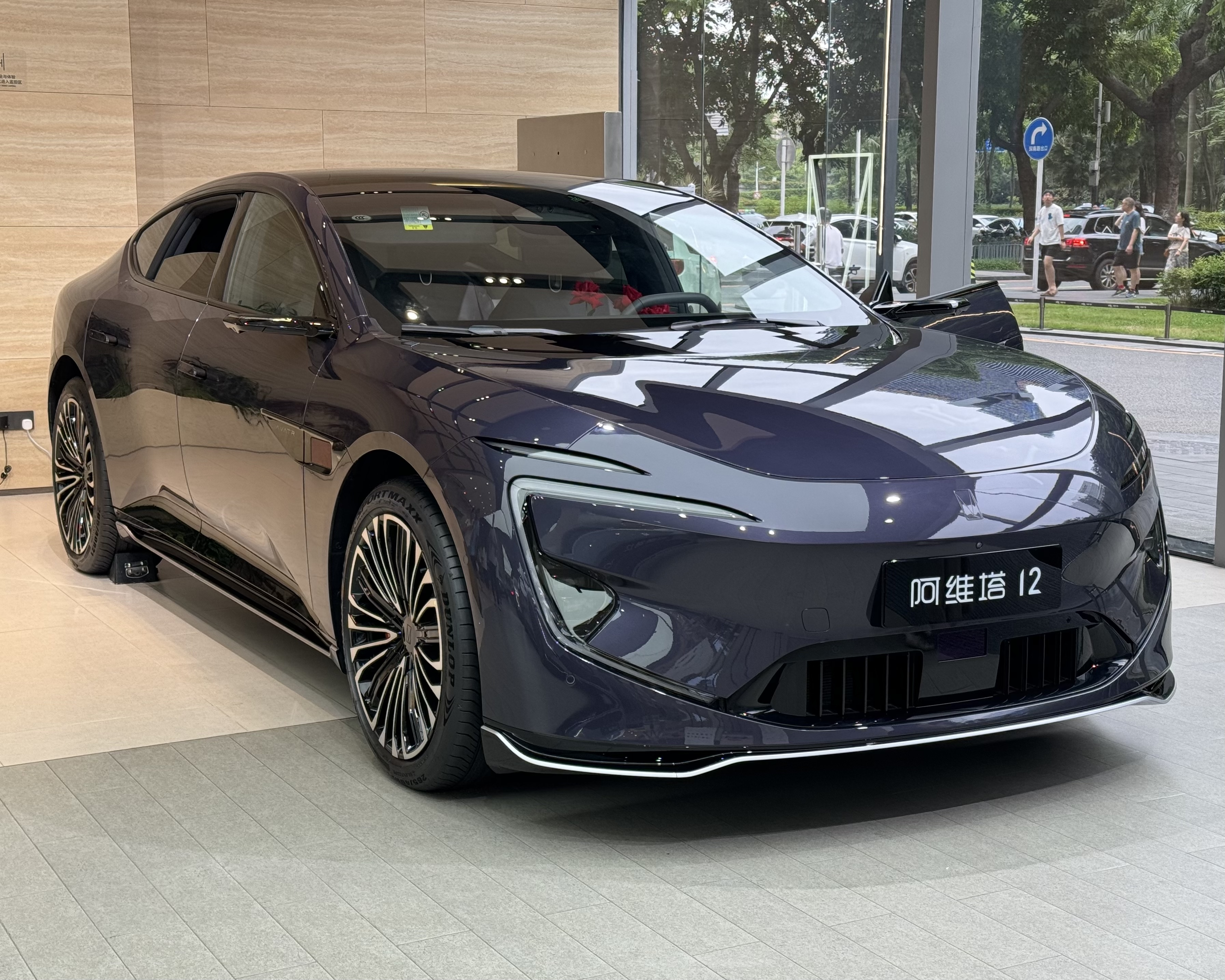
Avatr 12

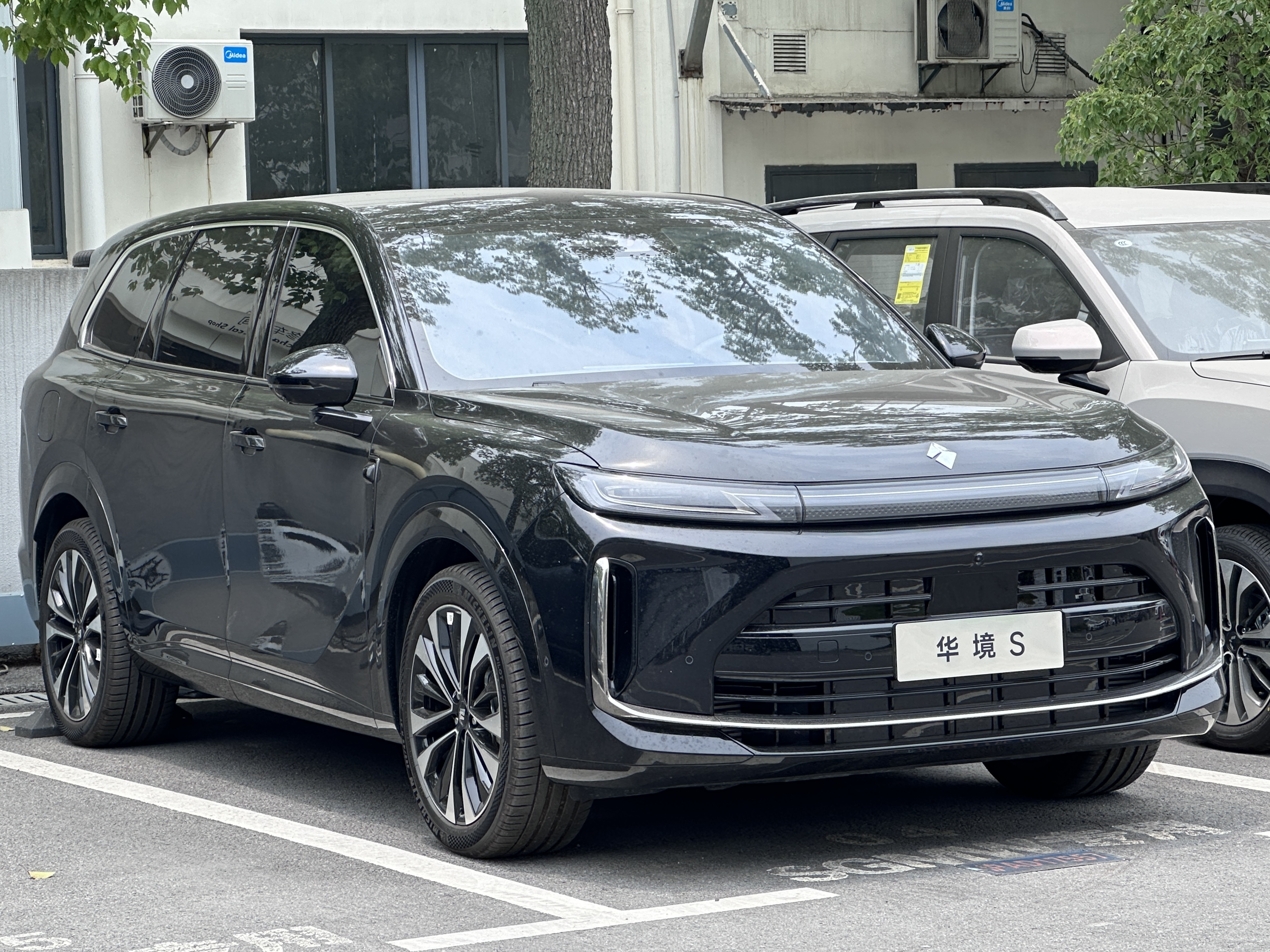
Huajing S

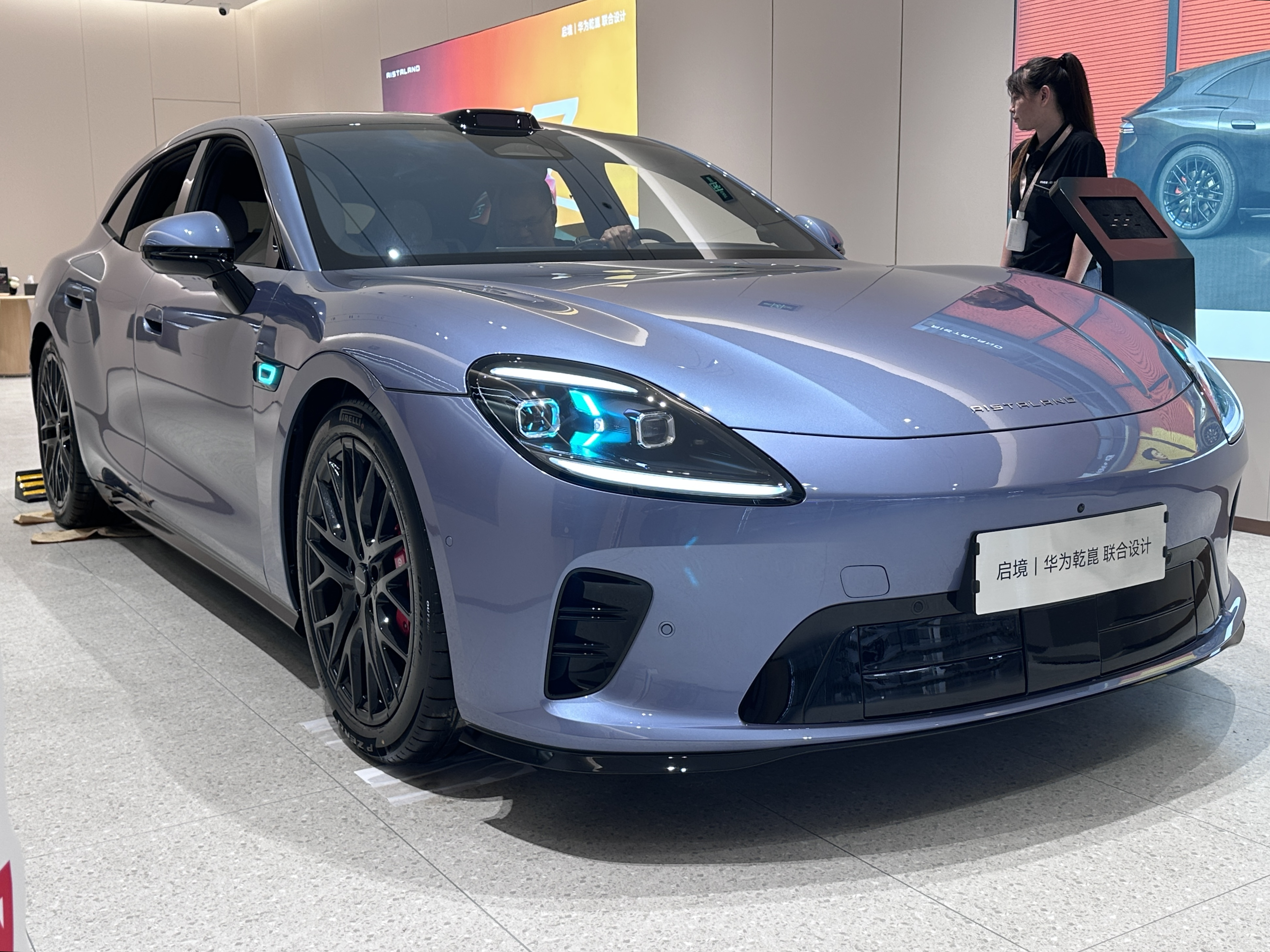
Aistaland GT7

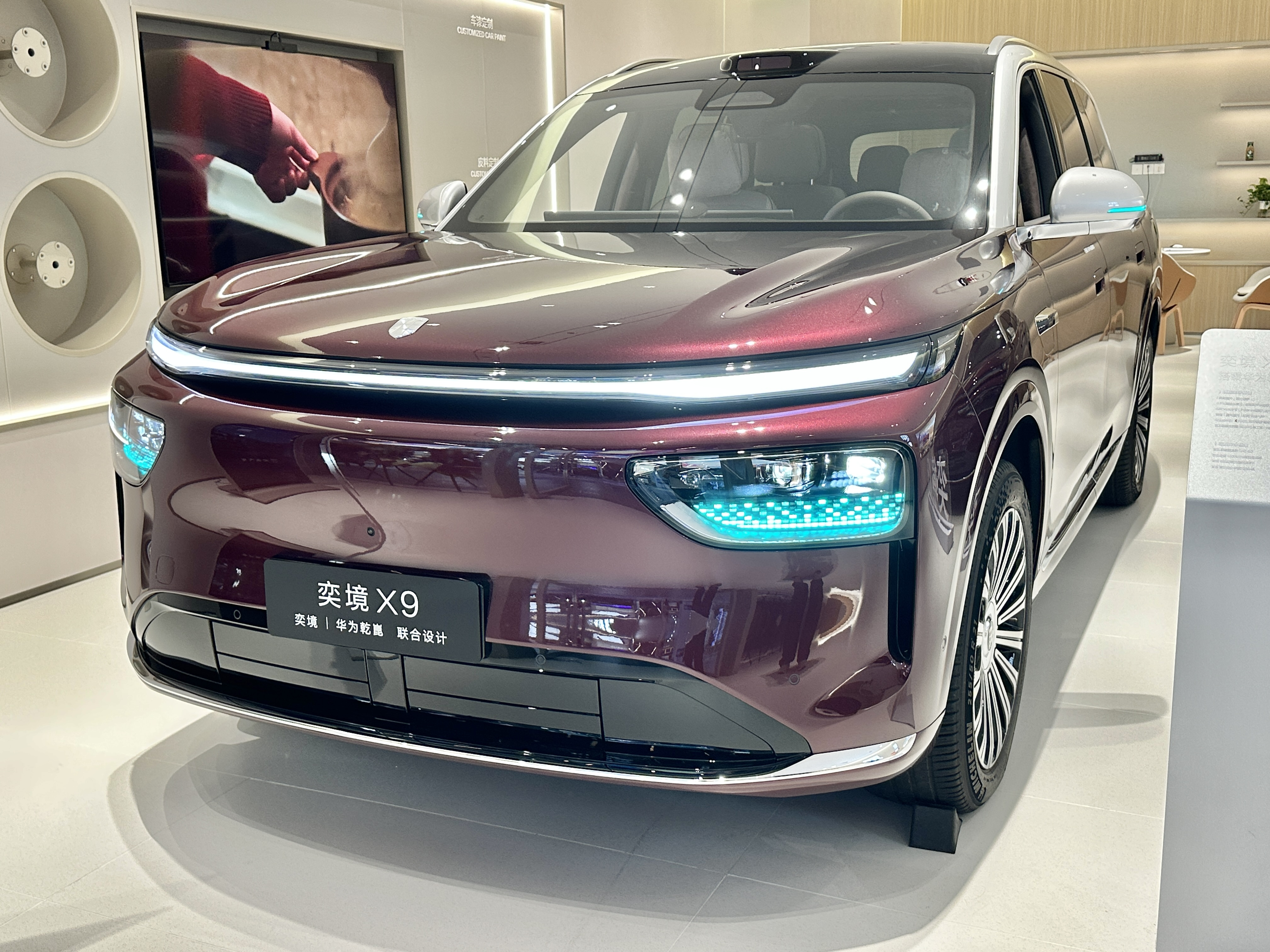
Epicland X9

=== Tier 3 — Huawei Inside (HI) ===
HI Mode (Huawei Inside) refers to Huawei providing full-stack automounts driving solution and Huawei's smart cockpit to car manufacturers. In this mode, Huawei empowers vehicle intelligence through the supply of both software and hardware, but does not participate in the design, development, and marketing of the vehicles. Currently, Arcfox, Avatr, Deepal, Voyah Audi, Trumpchi and Baojun are adopting this model in several of their vehicles.

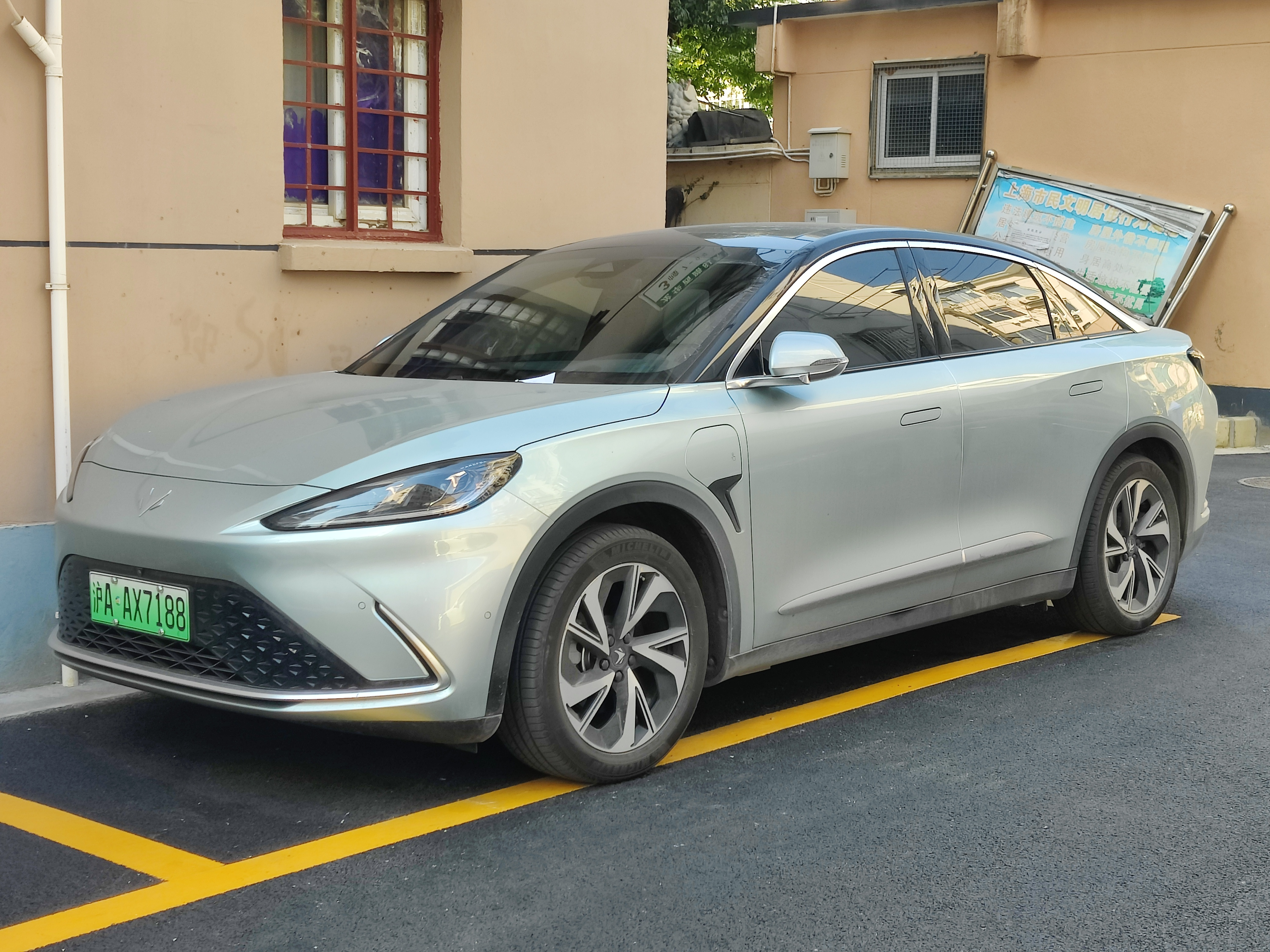
Arcfox αS6

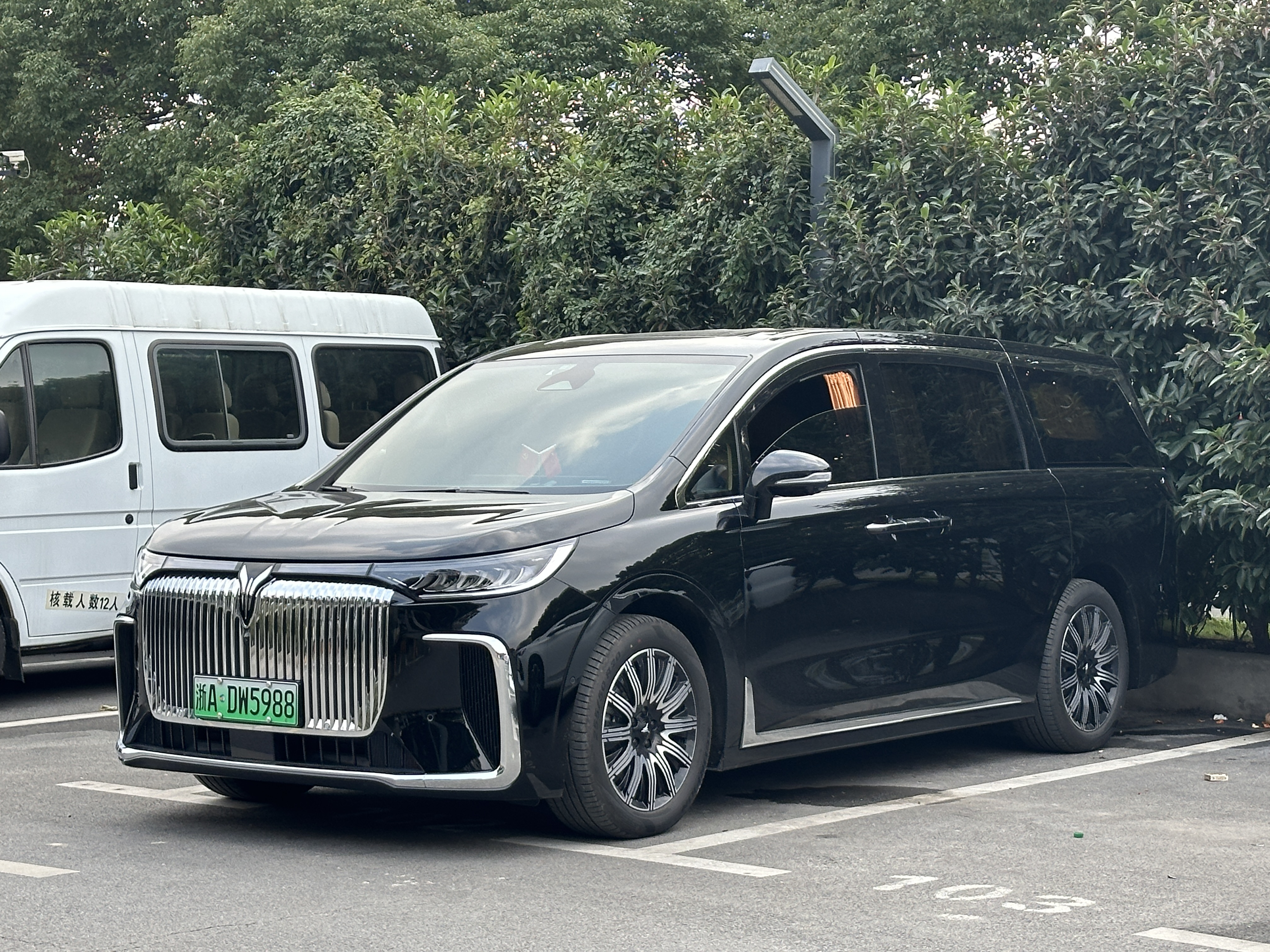
Voyah Dreamer

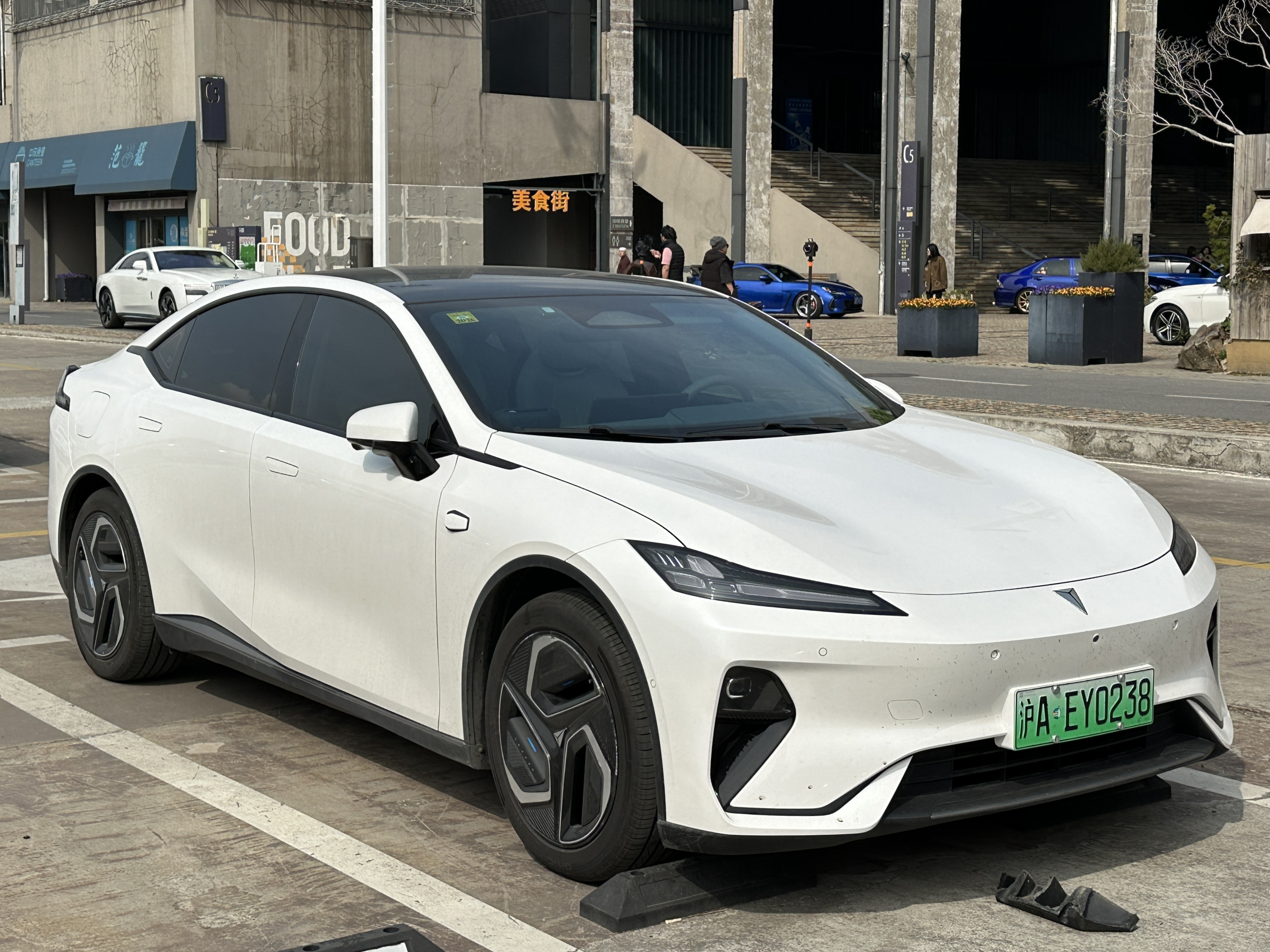
Deepal L07

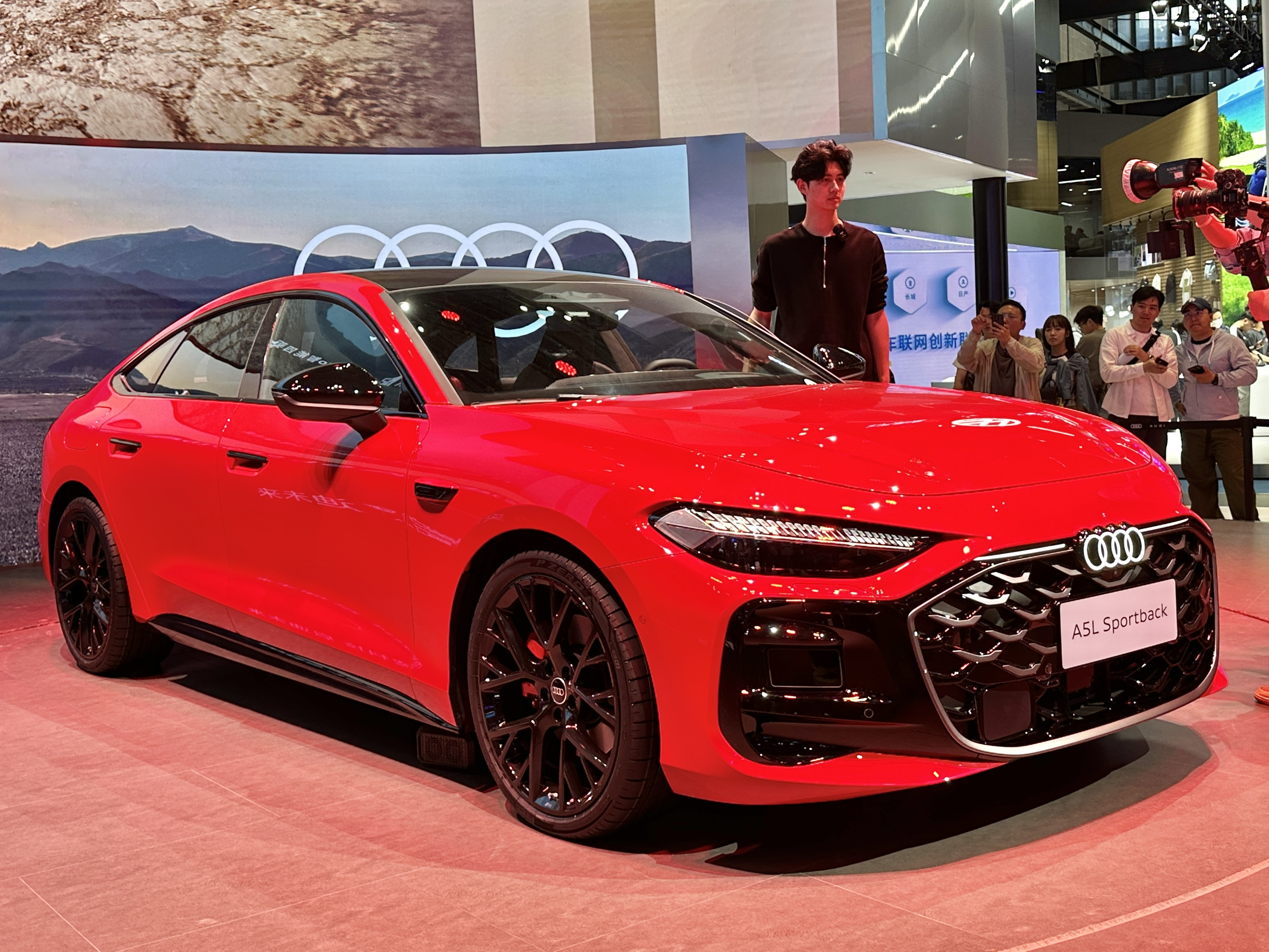
Audi A5L Sportback

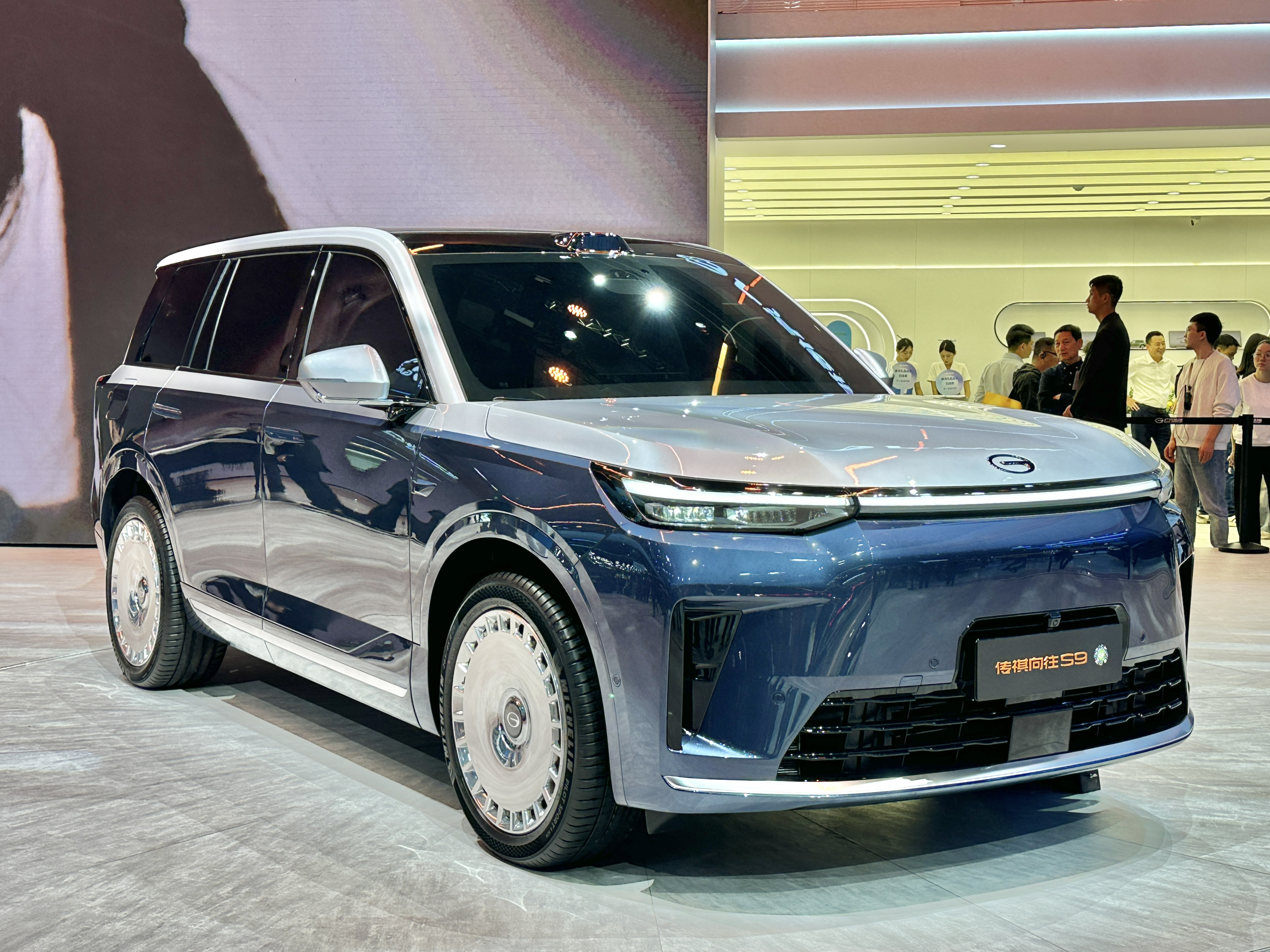
Trumpchi Xiangwang S9

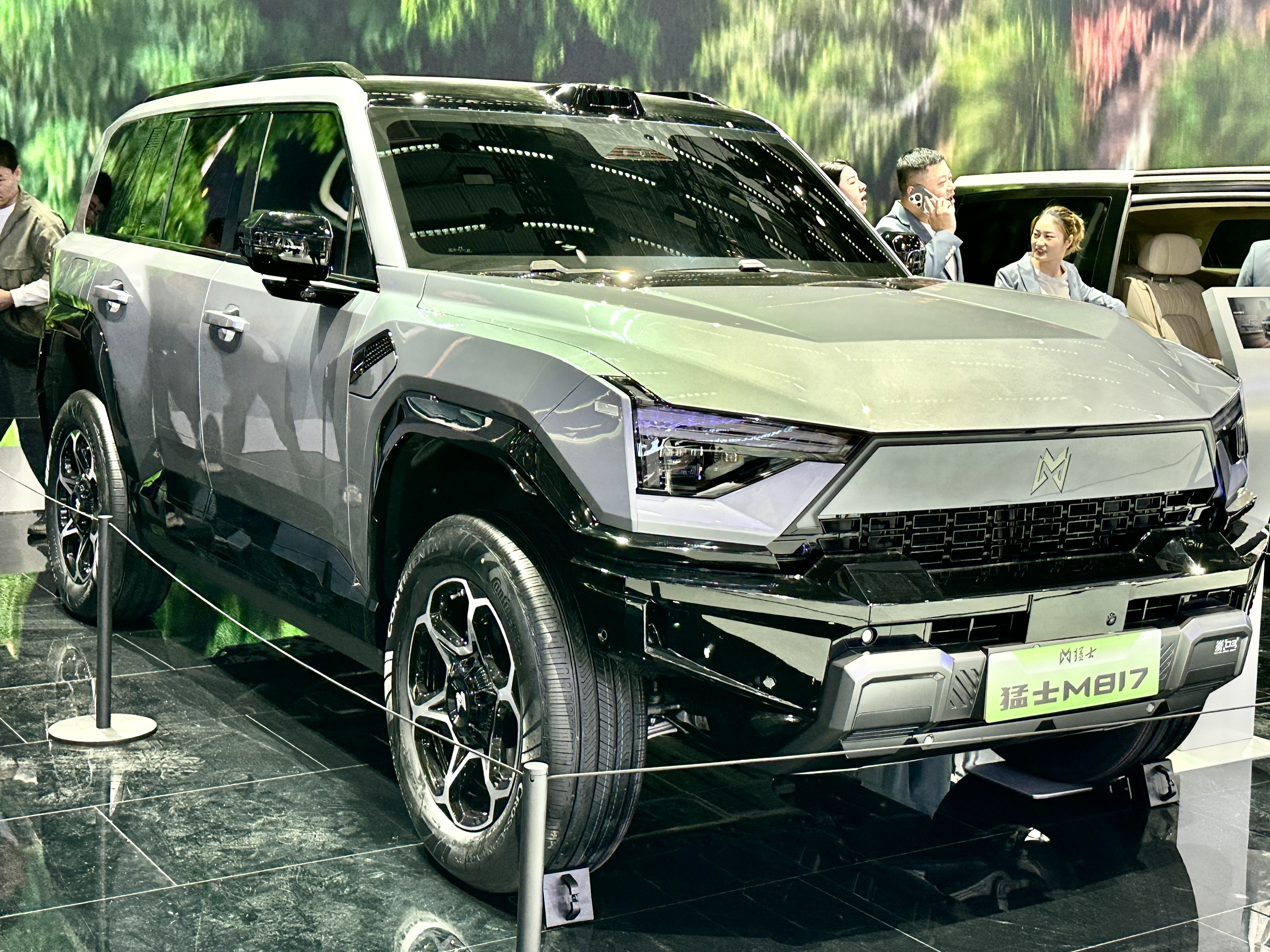
M-Hero M817

=== Tier 4 — Standardized parts supply ===
Huawei provides automobile parts and components like Lidar, electric motor, cameras and power management to car manufacturers, the most basic model. Several models from Trumpchi, Toyota, Nissan.

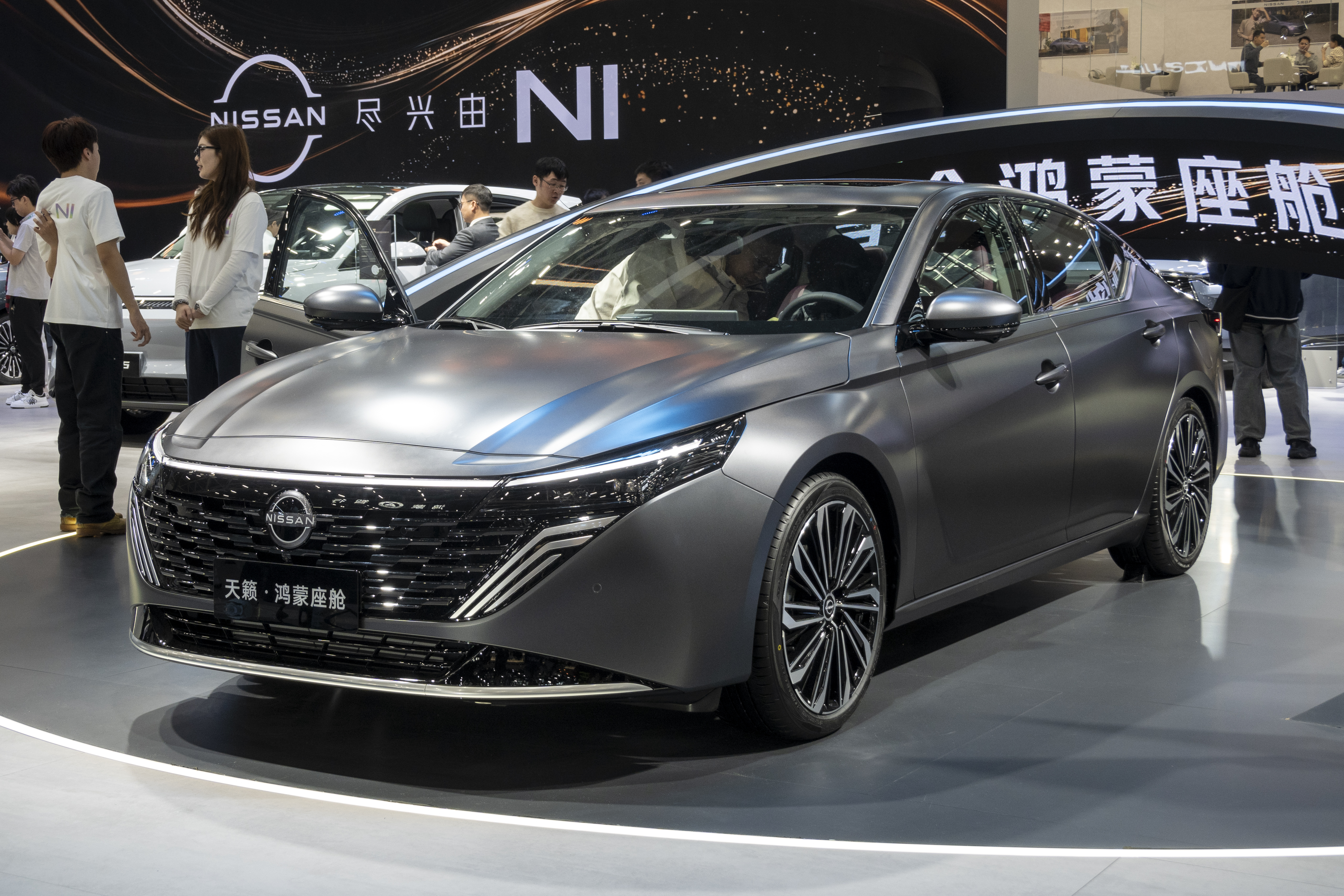
Nissan Teana (L34)

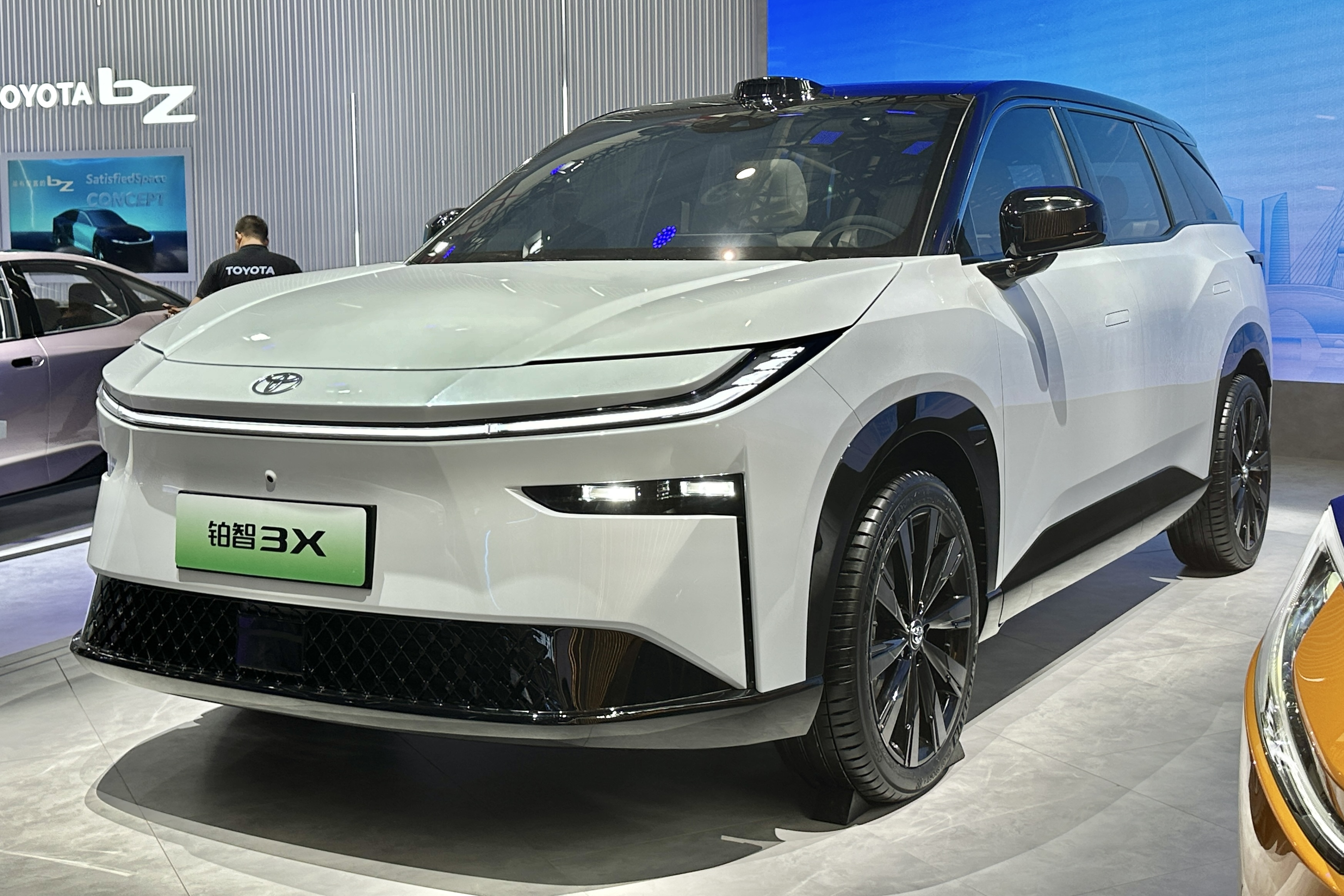
Toyota bZ3X

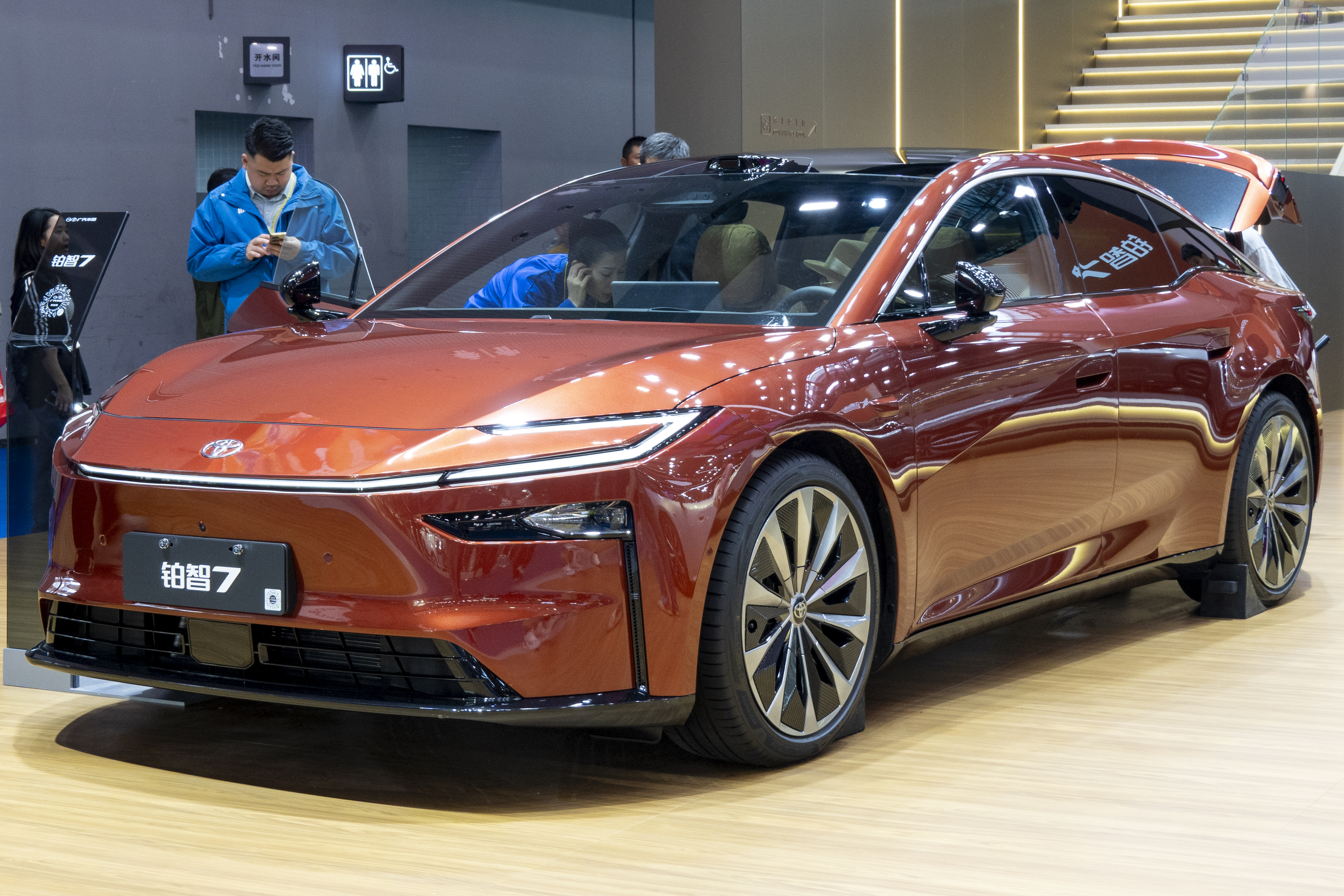
Toyota bZ7

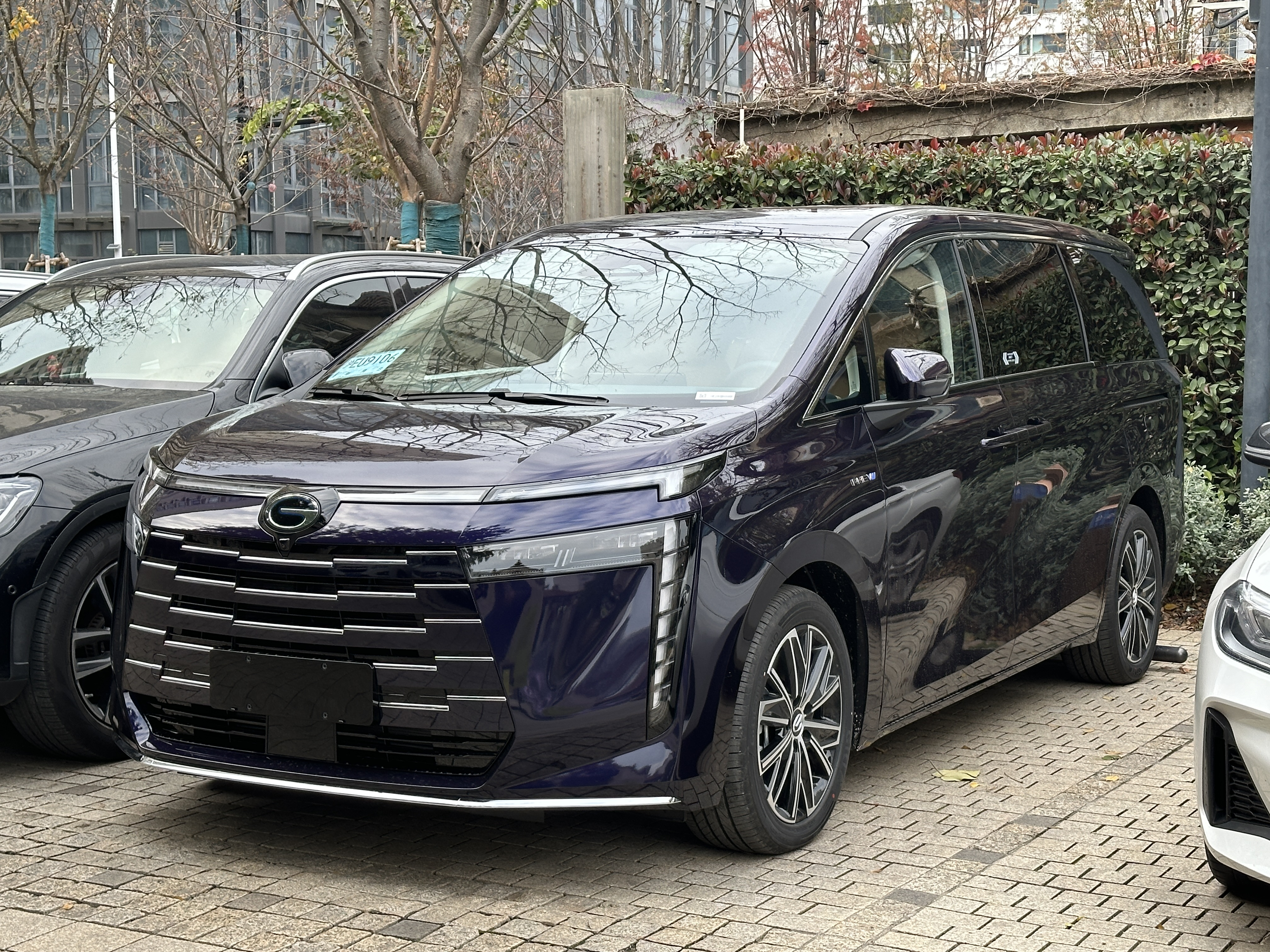
Trumpchi E8

== Product ==
Huawei provides modularized solutions to automakers, which includes Huawei ADS (Chinese: 华为乾崑智驾), Harmony Space (Chinese: 鸿蒙座舱), Qiankun Vehicle Control (Chinese: 乾崑车控), Qiankun Auto Lighting (Chinese: 乾崑车载光) and Qiankun Vehicle Cloud Service (Chinese: 乾崑车云服务).

=== Huawei ADS ===
Huawei ADS is a solution for autonomous driving system. It integrates multiple sensors such as LiDAR, cameras, millimeter-wave radars, and is equipped with high-performance computing platforms and full-stack self-developed anthropomorphic algorithms.

==== ADS 2.0 ====
The ADS 2.0 system is capable of both highway and urban NCA (Navigation Cruise Assist) without relying on high precision mapping, with mapless NCA being introduced to 15 cities in Q2 of 2023 and 45 cities in Q4 of 2023. Additionally, it is now capable of automatic parking and valet parking mode, where the vehicle can navigate to and park in a chosen parking space saved beforehand, though with the driver inside.

==== ADS 3.0 ====
The ADS 3.0 system was announced on 24 April 2024, with the update being deployed on 10 September 2024. Huawei says major improvements were made to the general obstacle detection and collision avoidance system in all directions, especially in pedestrian crossing and intersection scenarios. Additionally, the valet parking mode has been extended to allow for all passengers including the driver to exit the vehicle before parking itself. The forward AEB has an active speed of 4–140 km/h (2–87 mph), lateral collision avoidance between 40–130 km/h (25–81 mph), and rear collision avoidance at up to 60 km/h (37 mph). It uses a new 192-line roof-mounted LiDAR with a maximum detection range of 250 metres (820 ft).

The ADS 3.0 SE system is the first of the SE series, and is capable of highway NCA and automated parking.

==== ADS 5 ====
The Qiankun ADS 5 system was announced on 23 April 2026. Huawei says vehicles equipped with ADS 4 hardware can be upgraded to ADS 5 without hardware changes.

The most basic ADS 5 system is ADS 5 SE, which has a sensor suite consisting of 3 mmWave radars, 10 cameras, and 12 ultrasonic sensors. It is capable of highway NCA, lane centering control (LCC) in urban conditions, and parking assist.

ADS 5 Pro vehicles either use the roof-mounted 192-line LiDAR introduced in the ADS 2.0 Ultra suite or the solid-state in-cabin Limera located behind the windshield introduced with the second generation Aito M7. In addition to the ADS 5 SE's functions, the ADS 5 Pro is capable of urban NCA, parking NCA, and 'six-domain safety' systems.

The ADS 5 Max suite introduces a new roof-mounted 896-line dual optical path LiDAR, which Huawei claims is the highest resolution automotive LiDAR in mass production when it was launched on 4 March 2026. The first vehicles equipped with the sensor were the Maextro S800, Aito M9, Avatr 12, and Voyah Passion S. The ADS 5 Max suite also uses 3 or 5 mmWave radars in a unified configuration, where the sensors' raw data is sent to a central processor rather than processed locally, allowing for the use of MIMO techniques. In addition to ADS 5 Pro functions, the ADS 5 Max is capable of Roaming Cruise Assist (RCA) and NCA from parking space to parking space.

The ADS 5 Ultra has similar sensors and capabilities to the ADS 5 Max, but has appropriate sensor and computing redundancies to be considered SAE Level 3-ready, and is intended for use on high-end flagship models.

ADS sensors
Version		LiDAR		mmWave radar	Cameras	Ultrasonic
Version		Primary	Wide-angle	mmWave radar	Cameras	Ultrasonic
ADS 2.0	Max	126-line		3	11	12
ADS 2.0	Ultra	192-line		3	11	12
ADS 3.0	SE	—	—	3	10	12
ADS 3.0	Max	192-line		3	11	12
ADS 3.3	Max	192-line	3	5	11	12
ADS 4	SE	—	—	3	10	12
ADS 4	Pro	Limera or 192-line	—	3×4D	11	12
ADS 4	Max	192-line	0, 3, or 4	3 or 5×4D	11	12
ADS 5	SE	—	—	3	10	12
ADS 5	Pro	Limera or 192-line	—	3×4D	11	12
ADS 5	Max	896-line	0, 3, or 4	3 or 5×4D	11	12
ADS 5	Ultra	896-line	4	5×4D	11	12

===== Topology =====
- Huawei Qiankun Intelligent Driving ADS 5
  - WEWA (World engine World action) 2.0 Architecture
    - Cloud World Engine (WE)
    - Vehicle World Action Model (WA)
  - Qiankun OS - low latency zero trust operating system for self-driving
  - CAS (Comprehensive Anti-collision System) 5.0 Safety System
    - Six-Dimensional Safety (All-time, All-speed, All-direction, All-object, All-weather, All-scenario)
    - Driver incapacitation assist 2.0
  - Spot-to-Spot/Parking-to-Parking 3.0
    - Navigation Cruise Assist (NCA)
    - Fully automated valet parking

=== Harmony Space (Harmony Cockpit) ===
Harmony Space (or Harmony Cockpit formerly) is a software and hardware solution with HarmonyOS vehicle operating system as its core which integrates the in-vehicle intelligent operating system and software ecosystem, high-end audio system, and in-vehicle display screens.

=== Qiankun Vehicle Control ===
Qiankun Vehicle Control integrates Qiankun iDVP automotive chassis, XMOTION high-performance suspension, and efficient heat pump air conditioning system.

=== Qiankun Auto Lighting ===
Qiankun Auto Lighting integrates solutions for high-performance automotive lighting modules, in-vehicle light projection, AR-HUD systems.

== See also ==
- Automobile manufacturers and brands of China
- Momenta (autonomous driving solution company backed by SAIC, GM, and Toyota)
- Qianli Technology (Geely's autonomous driving solution company)
- Zhuoyu Technology (FAW and DJI's autonomous driving solution company)
- DeepRoute.ai (autonomous driving solution company backed by GWM)
- Horizon Robotics (Chinese autonomous driving solution company)
