= Zhuoyu Technology =

Chinese autonomous driving technology company

Shenzhen Zhuoyu Technology Co., Ltd.
- Formerly: DJI Automotive
- Industry: Autonomous driving Automotive technology
- Founded: 2022; 4 years ago (as independent entity); 2016; 10 years ago (as DJI's automotive division)
- Headquarters: Shenzhen, China
- Key people: Shaojie Shen (CEO)
- Products: Chengxing Platform; Advanced driver-assistance systems
- Owner: FAW Group (35.8%); New Territory (DJI's affiliate) (34.85%)
- Website: www.zyt.com

Zhuoyu Technology (Chinese: 卓驭科技), formerly known as DJI Automotive, is a Chinese autonomous driving technology company specializing in advanced driver-assistance systems (ADAS) and full-stack self-developed core components for passenger vehicles. The company was originally established as DJI's automotive division in 2016 before being spun off as an independent entity in 2023.

== History ==
Zhuoyu Technology traces its origins to DJI's internal automotive division, which was established in 2016 as a project team focused on smart driving technology research and development. In 2023, the division was formally spun off from DJI and operated independently.

In June 2024, the company officially adopted "Zhuoyu" as its business brand name alongside a new logo.

In September 2025, FAW Group acquired 35.8% of Zhuoyu through capital increase and share purchase, becoming the company's largest single shareholder and jointly controlling Zhuoyu with DJI's affiliate New Territory, which held 34.85% of shares after the transaction. Prior to this, BYD and SAIC also held minority stakes in Zhuoyu through their investment entities.

== Technology ==
Zhuoyu's core product is the Chengxing Platform (成行平台), an intelligent driving system that provides high-level driving assistance functions covering highway, urban, and parking scenarios. The platform supports integrated cockpit-drive integration, compatibility with multiple chips, and flexible computing power expansion.

The company employs a "low computing power for high-level functions" approach, claiming to achieve highway navigation pilot functions with only 32 TOPS of computing power and urban navigation pilot functions with 100 TOPS. This contrasts with industry mainstream solutions that typically require at least 254 TOPS using NVIDIA Orin-X chips.

Zhuoyu has developed several hardware configurations for the Chengxing Platform, including 7V mid-computing power, 7V high-computing power, 10V high-computing power, and lidar high-computing power solutions. The FAW Hongqi Tiangong 08 is the first mass-production model equipped with Zhuoyu's 10V high-computing power solution with 100 TOPS SoC computing power.

== Partnerships ==
Zhuoyu has established partnerships with multiple automotive manufacturers including FAW Group, Volkswagen, SAIC-GM-Wuling, Chery, Dongfeng, GWM, BYD, Audi, and BAIC.

The company has a significant partnership with Volkswagen Group, with their jointly developed IQ.Pilot intelligent assistant driving system deployed in multiple Volkswagen fuel vehicle models including the Teramont, Tayron L, Sagitar L, and the Magotan.This collaboration began in 2018 when Volkswagen selected DJI Automotive from numerous suppliers.

In September 2025, Zhuoyu announced its European strategy with the establishment of a German subsidiary in Braunschweig, marking the beginning of its global expansion.

Brands and vehicles supplied by Zhuoyu's solution
Manufacturers	Brands	Vehicles
FAW	Hongqi	G919, H7(2nd gen), Tiangong 08, Tiangong 06, Tiangong 07/EH7 Tiangong 05, HS6
FAW-Volkswagen	Volkswagen	Magotan (B9), Tayron L, Talagon, Sagitar L
SAIC-Volkswagen	Volkswagen	Tiguan L (3rd gen), Teramont Pro, Passat Pro
SAIC-GM-Wuling	Baojun	Kiwi EV, Yunduo, Yep, Yep Plus, Yunhai, Xiangjing
SAIC-GM-Wuling	Wuling	Starlight, Starlight S
Chery	Chery	Fulwin X3 Plus, Fulwin X3L
Chery	Jetour	Shanhai L7 Plus, X90(2nd gen)
Chery	iCar	03, 03T
Dongfeng	Nammi	Nammi 06
GWM	Haval	Xiaolong Max, Raptor
BAIC	Arcfox	αT7, αT5, αS5, Wendao V9
XCMG	Hanjing	

== Ownership ==
As of September 2025:

- FAW Group - 35.8%
- New Territory (DJI's affiliate) - 34.85%
- Other shareholders include BYD and SAIC Group - 29.35%

== See also ==
- Yinwang (Huawei's autonomous driving solution company)
- Qianli Technology (Geely's autonomous driving solution company)
- Momenta (autonomous driving solution company backed by SAIC, GM, and Toyota)
- DeepRoute.ai (autonomous driving solution company backed by GWM)
- Horizon Robotics (Chinese autonomous driving solution company)
- DJI (company)
- Autonomous driving
- Advanced driver-assistance systems
