= Auto Shenzhen =

Chinese auto show

- English name: Guangdong-Hong Kong-Macao Greater Bay Area International Auto Show
- Duration: May and June, annually
- Venue: Shenzhen World Exhibition and Convention Center
- Location: Shenzhen, China
- Also known as: Shenzhen Auto Show; Guangdong-Hong Kong-Macao Greater Bay Area International Auto Show; Shenzhen-Hong Kong-Macao International Auto Show; Shenzhen International Auto Show; Shenzhen International Auto Expo; Shenzhen Auto Carnival and International Automobile Trade Fair; China (Shenzhen) Automobile Culture Expo
- Theme: Auto show
- Organized by: Shenzhen United Exhibition Group Co., Ltd.
- Website: www.szautoshow.com/en/ygaIndex/index.aspx

The Guangdong-Hong Kong-Macao Greater Bay Area International Auto Show (Chinese: 粤港澳大湾区车展; pinyin: yuè gǎng'ào dà wān qū chēzhǎn), also simply known as Auto Shenzhen, is an auto show held by Shenzhen United Exhibition Group Co., Ltd. in May and June every year in the Shenzhen World Exhibition and Convention Center, in the Bao'an District of Shenzhen, China.

The first event was held in 1991 as the Shenzhen International Auto Expo, and was the second international auto show in China after the 1990 Beijing Auto Show. It was renamed to the Shenzhen-Hong Kong-Macao International Auto Show in 2009, and to its current name in 2020.

== 2025 ==
The 29th edition of the show was held from May 31 to June 8, 2025. The first day, May 31, is a media day while all following days are open to the public.

The show had 50 new car launches (Note: A launch can include any reveal of a vehicle including reveals of previously unseen interiors or trim levels, and can also include the start of vehicle pre-orders or deliveries.), 112 participating brands, and 1,039 models on display, attracting 890,000 visitors who ordered 42,823 vehicles worth a total of 10.07 billion yuan.

=== Production vehicles ===
- Audi Q6L e-tron (FAW)
- Maextro S800
- M-Hero M817
- Smart #1 update
- Volvo S90 facelift
- Xiaomi YU7
- Yangwang U8L

== 2024 ==
The 28th edition of the show was held from June 1 to 9, 2024. It will be the first to be held at the Shenzhen World Exhibition & Convention Center in Bao'an District.

=== Production vehicles ===
- Genesis G80

== 2023 ==
The 27th edition of the show was held from June 16 to 24, 2023. It was the last to be held at the Shenzhen Convention and Exhibition Center in Futian District.

=== Production vehicles ===
- Nio ET5 Touring

== 2022 ==
The 26th edition of the show was held from May 28 to June 5, 2022. It was the first auto show held in China in 2022, as the Beijing Auto Show was postponed due to COVID-19 related complications.

=== Production vehicles ===
- Leapmotor C01
