= Nissan NX8 =

Mid-size crossover SUV

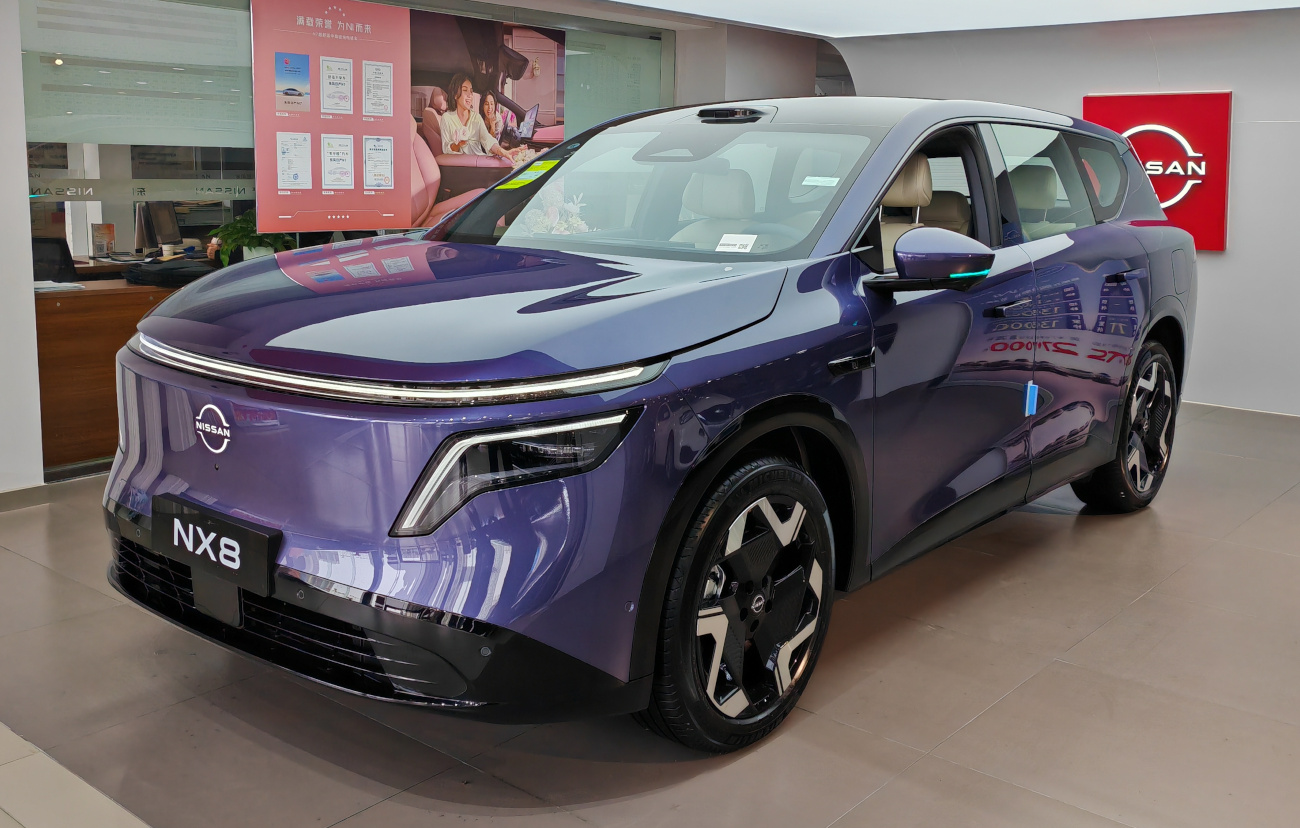

Overview
- Manufacturer: Nissan
- Production: January 2026 – present
- Assembly: China: Guangzhou (Dongfeng Nissan)

Body and chassis
- Class: Mid-size crossover SUV (D)
- Body style: 5-door SUV
- Layout: Battery electric: Rear-motor, rear-wheel-drive; Range-extended EV: Front-engine, rear-motor, rear-wheel-drive
- Platform: Tianyan Architecture 2.0 / K1-RWD
- Related: Nissan N6; Nissan N7; M-Hero M817; Voyah Free

Powertrain
- Engine: Petrol range extender: 1.5 L SFG15T turbocharged I4
- Electric motor: EV: 215–250 kW (292–340 PS; 288–335 hp); EREV: 115 kW (156 PS; 154 hp) (engine); 195 kW (265 PS; 261 hp) (motor)
- Hybrid drivetrain: Series (EREV)
- Battery: 20.3, 21.1, 34.7, 73, and 81 kWh CATL-Nissan Yundun LFP
- Electric range: 565–650 km (351–404 mi) (EV); 102–185 km (63–115 mi) (EREV)
- Plug-in charging: 800V 5C (EV)

Dimensions
- Wheelbase: 2,917 mm (114.8 in)
- Length: 4,870 mm (191.7 in)
- Width: 1,920 mm (75.6 in)
- Height: 1,680 mm (66.1 in)
- Curb weight: 2,035–2,245 kg (4,486–4,949 lb)

The Nissan NX8 (Chinese: 日产NX8; pinyin: Rìchǎn NX8) is a battery electric and range-extended mid-size crossover SUV produced by the Dongfeng Nissan joint venture and sold under the Nissan brand. It is the first SUV in Nissan's China-exclusive N series.

== Overview ==
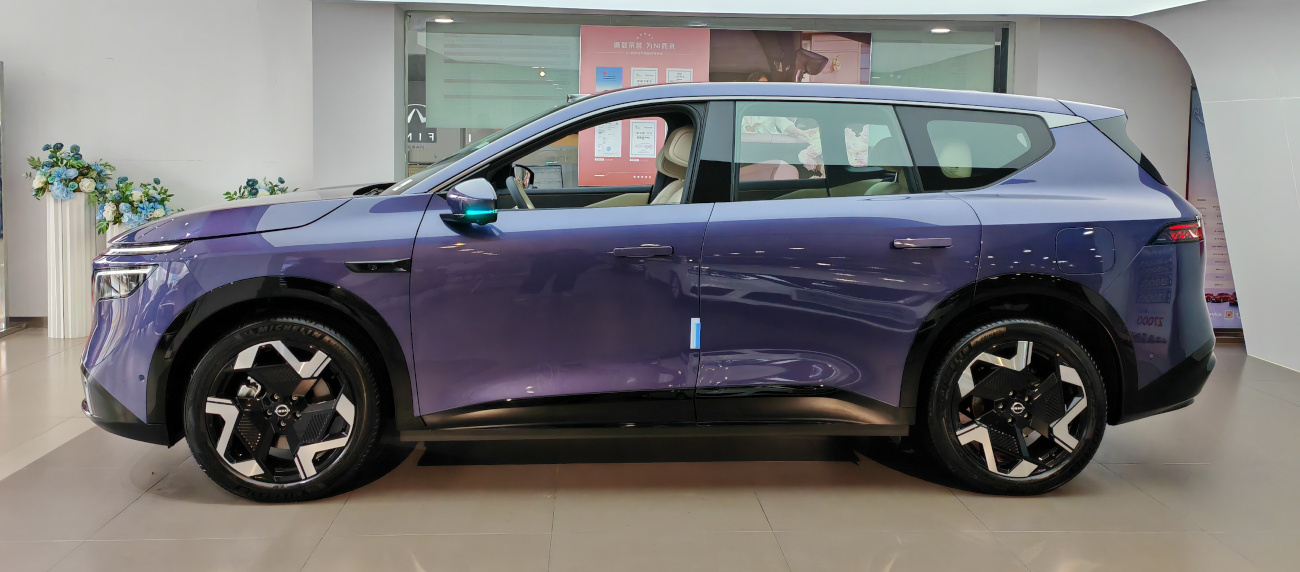
Side view

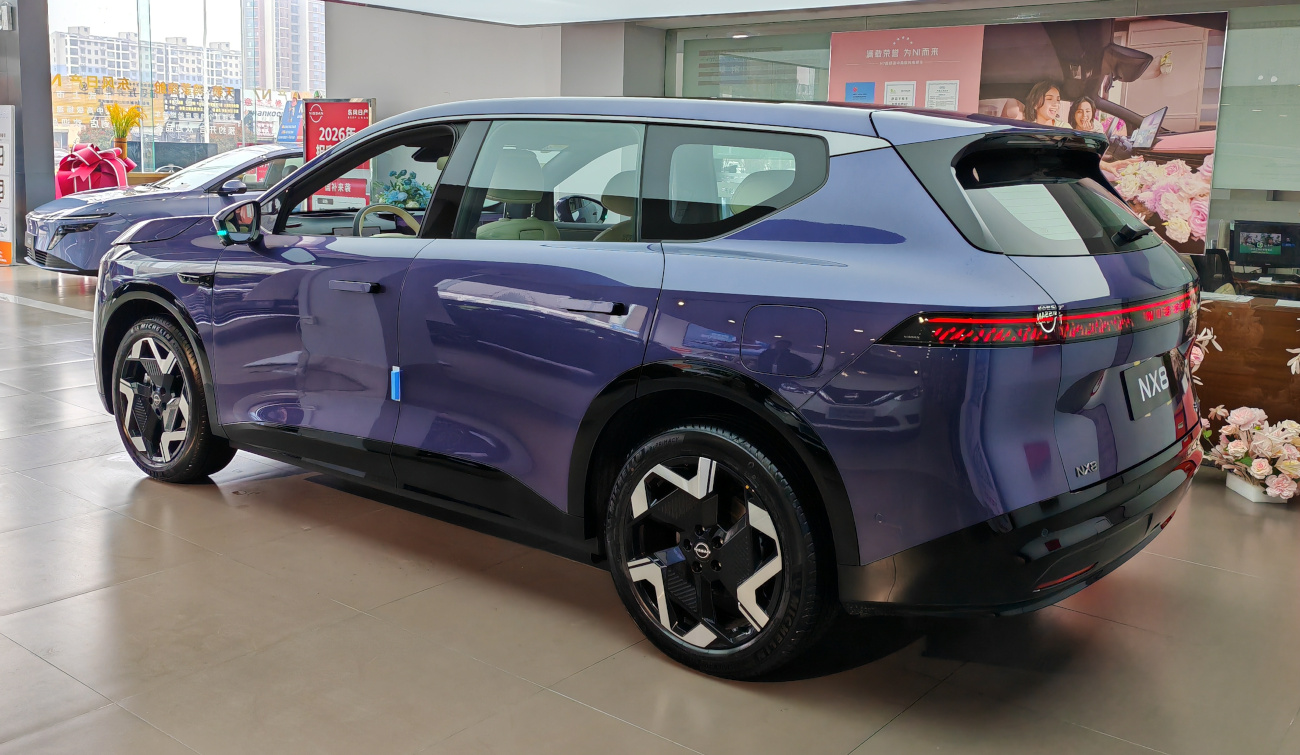
Rear view

The NX8 is a range-extended and electric mid-to-large SUV. It is the first vehicle in the N series to be available in both electric and plug-in hybrid forms, CATL 5C charging technology, and an 800-volt platform for the electric version. Its battery makes the NX8 capable of operating in temperatures from -30 °C to 60 °C (-22 °F to 140 °F). The NX8 uses a two-row, 5-seat arrangement and has a design language similar to the N6.

The NX8 was previewed by the Nissan Epic Concept at Auto China 2024.

Production of the NX8 commenced on January 28, 2026.

The NX8 launched on April 8, 2026. Sales began on the same day.

=== Design ===
The exterior uses Nissan's current V-Motion design language. The front end uses a 2.4-meter full-width light bar, a flat illuminated logo, and matrix-style headlamps. Retractable door handles are used. The back includes an OLED taillight panel composed of 2064 units with customizable lighting patterns. It will offer 18, 19, and 20-inch wheels, with the 18 and 19-inch wheels being combined with 235/55 tires while the 20-inch wheels are combined with 235/50 tires.

=== Features ===
A LiDAR sensor is included on the roof. The NX8 is also capable of 5C fast-charging. It has dual 15.6-inch central touchscreens for both the driver and passenger, a 63-inch AR-HUD, and a 10.25-inch digital instrument cluster. A 25-speaker sound system with an output of 2000 watts also comes standard. The infotainment system uses Nissan's own Nissan OS 2.0 and is powered by a Qualcomm Snapdragon 8295P chip.

== Powertrain ==
The NX8 EREV uses a 1.5 liter turbocharged inline 4 producing 146 horsepower paired with an electric motor on Rear wheels producing 261 horsepower. The NX8 EV uses an electric motor on Rear axle producing between 288 and 335 horsepower. Batteries with lithium iron phosphate (LFP) chemistry are utilized. CATL produces the batteries but they are developed and packaged by Nissan. The EREV will be offered with 3 battery sizes: 20.3, 21.1, and 37.4 kWh. 20.3 and 21.1 kWh models both get an electric range of 102 kilometres (63 mi), while 37.4 kWh models get an electric range of 185 kilometres (115 mi).

The pure-electric models use 800V power electronics and have an option of 73 or 81 kWh Yundun LFP battery packs also supplied by CATL, which weigh 513 and 593 kilograms (1,131 and 1,307 lb), respectively.

Specifications
Engine (Generator)	Electric motor	Battery		Range (CLTC)	Kerb weight
Engine (Generator)	Electric motor	Type	Weight	EV	Kerb weight
1.5L SFG15T Turbo I4	Permanent Magnet on Rear axle	20.3 kWh Yundun LFP CATL	193 kg (425 lb)	102 km (63 mi)	2,045–2,080 kg (4,508–4,586 lb)
1.5L SFG15T Turbo I4	Permanent Magnet on Rear axle	21.1 kWh Yundun LFP CATL	197 kg (434 lb)	102 km (63 mi)	2,035–2,080 kg (4,486–4,586 lb)
1.5L SFG15T Turbo I4	Permanent Magnet on Rear axle	37.4 kWh Yundun LFP CATL	300 kg (661 lb)	185 km (115 mi)	2,142–2,180 kg (4,722–4,806 lb)
N/A	Permanent Magnet on Rear axle	73 kWh Yundun LFP CATL	513 kg (1,131 lb)	565–580 km (351–360 mi)	2,119–2,160 kg (4,672–4,762 lb)
N/A	Permanent Magnet on Rear axle	81 kWh Yundun LFP CATL	593 kg (1,307 lb)	630–650 km (390–400 mi)	2,196–2,245 kg (4,841–4,949 lb)

== Sales ==
Within 30 minutes of its launch on April 8, 2026, the NX8 received 8,423 orders.
