= S800 =

S800 may refer to:

- Canon S800, a Canon S Series digital camera
- Honda S800, a 1965 sport car
- Snapdragon 800, a quad-core mobile processor by Qualcomm
- Maextro S800, a 2025 ultra-luxury electric vehicle

S-800 may refer to:

- NATO codename for 1975 Russian Zaslon radar
