= M-Hero =

Chinese electric vehicle manufacturer

Dongfeng Motor Corporation M-Hero Automotive Technology Co., Ltd.
- Native name: 东风汽车集团股份有限公司猛士汽车科技公司
- Type: State-owned Subsidiary
- Industry: Automotive
- Founded: 2022; 4 years ago
- Area served: China
- Key people: Cao Dongjie (CEO); Wang Jiong (Vice president & Chief brand officer)
- Products: Electric vehicles

Chinese name
- Simplified Chinese: 猛士科技
- Hanyu Pinyin: Měngshī Kējì
- Website: m-hero.com

M-Hero is a marque jointly operated by Dongfeng Motor Corporation M-Hero Automotive Technology Co., Ltd. (Chinese: 东风汽车集团股份有限公司猛士汽车科技公司) and M-Hero Automotive Technology (Xiangyang) Co., Ltd. (Chinese: 猛士科技（襄阳）有限公司).

M-Hero (Dongfeng) is a Chinese state-owned subsidiary of Dongfeng Motor Corporation specializing in body-on-frame high-performance off-road electric vehicles.

M-Hero (Xiangyang) is a joint venture between Government of Xiangyang, Dongfeng Motor Corporation, and Dongfeng-Nissan. M-Hero (Xiangyang) specializes in developing lightweight off-road SUVs.

The brand name "Mengshi" (猛士, literally: Fierce warrior) is inherited from Dongfeng's military vehicle line. M-Hero focuses on producing advanced electric vehicles (EVs) and extended-range electric vehicles (EREVs) for the civilian market.

== History ==
M-Hero was established in 2022 as a subsidiary of Dongfeng Motor Group (DFG), a listed company under the larger Dongfeng Motor Corporation (DFM). While M-Hero operates in the consumer automotive sector, Dongfeng Mengshi (东风猛士), a separate entity under DFM, focuses on military vehicle production. The distinction between the two brands lies in their parent companies and market focus, with DFM's military operations being largely classified.

In 2023, M-Hero unveiled its first production model, the M-Hero 917, a full-size luxury off-road SUV available in both EV and EREV configurations. The vehicle boasts over 1,000 horsepower and a range of 505 kilometers (314 miles), positioning it as a high-performance competitor in the luxury EV market.

M-Hero Automotive Technology (Xiangyang) Co., Ltd.
- Native name: 猛士科技（襄阳）有限公司
- Type: State-owned
- Industry: Automotive
- Founded: 2025; 1 year ago
- Number of locations: Xiangyang City, Hubei Province, China
- Area served: China
- Products: Electric vehicles
- Owner: Government of Xiangyang (47.2%) Dongfeng Motor Corporation (41.9%) Dongfeng Motor Limited (Dongfeng Nissan) (10.9%)
- Website: m-hero.com

=== Brand sharing ===
In September 2025, Dongfeng Motor announced that it, along with Gvoernment of Xiangyang City, and Dongfeng Nissan, signed an investment agreement to establish a joint venture called M-Hero Automotive Technology (Xiangyang). The local state-owned enterprises of Xiangyang hold a 47.2% stake, DFM holds a 41.9% stake, Dongfeng Nissan holds a 10.9% stake. The company will collaborate with Huawei, sharing the M-Hero brand with M-Hero Technology, to develop lightweight off-road SUVs led by Yinwang under the new HI Plus Mode.

== Products ==
M-Hero's product lineup focuses on high-performance luxury off-road vehicles. Key models include:

=== Current models of M-Hero (Dongfeng) ===
- M-Hero 917 (2023–present), full-size luxury SUV, BEV/EREV
  - M-Hero 917L (to commence), long wheelbase variant
- M-Hero M-Hunter (2024–present), full-size ROV, BEV/EREV
- M-Hero M817 (2025–present), full-size SUV, PHEV/EREV
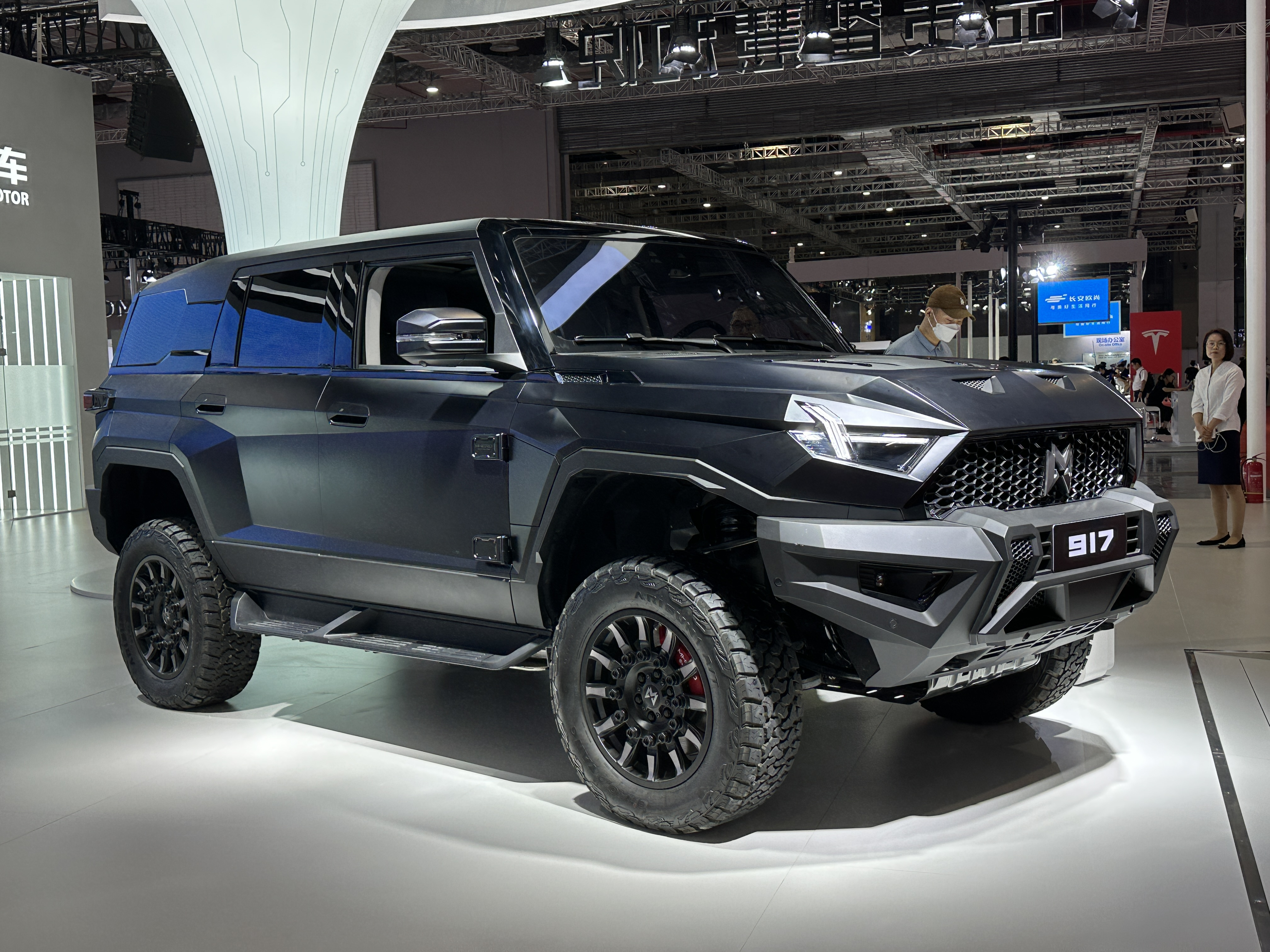
M-Hero 917

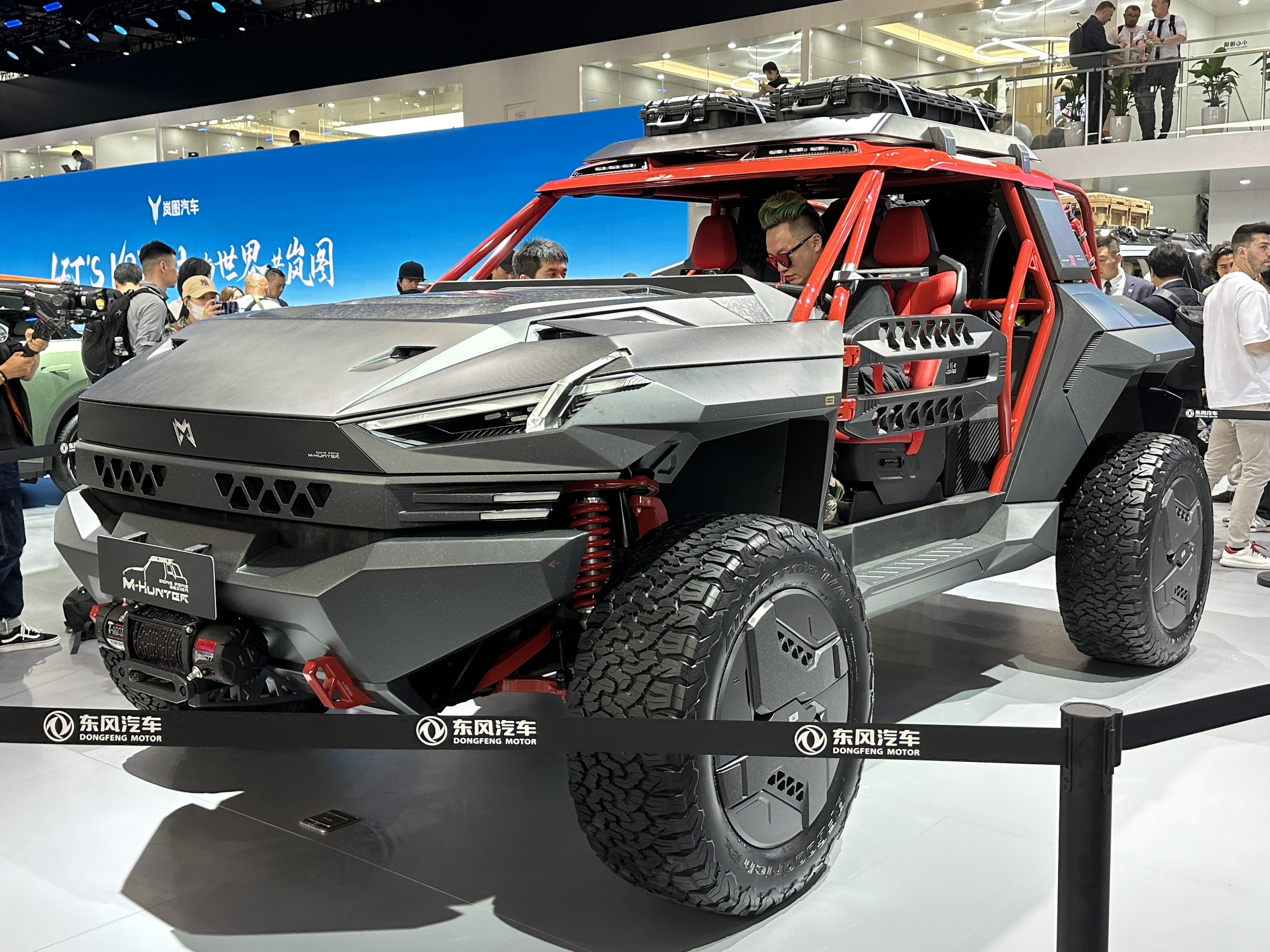
M-Hero M-Hunter

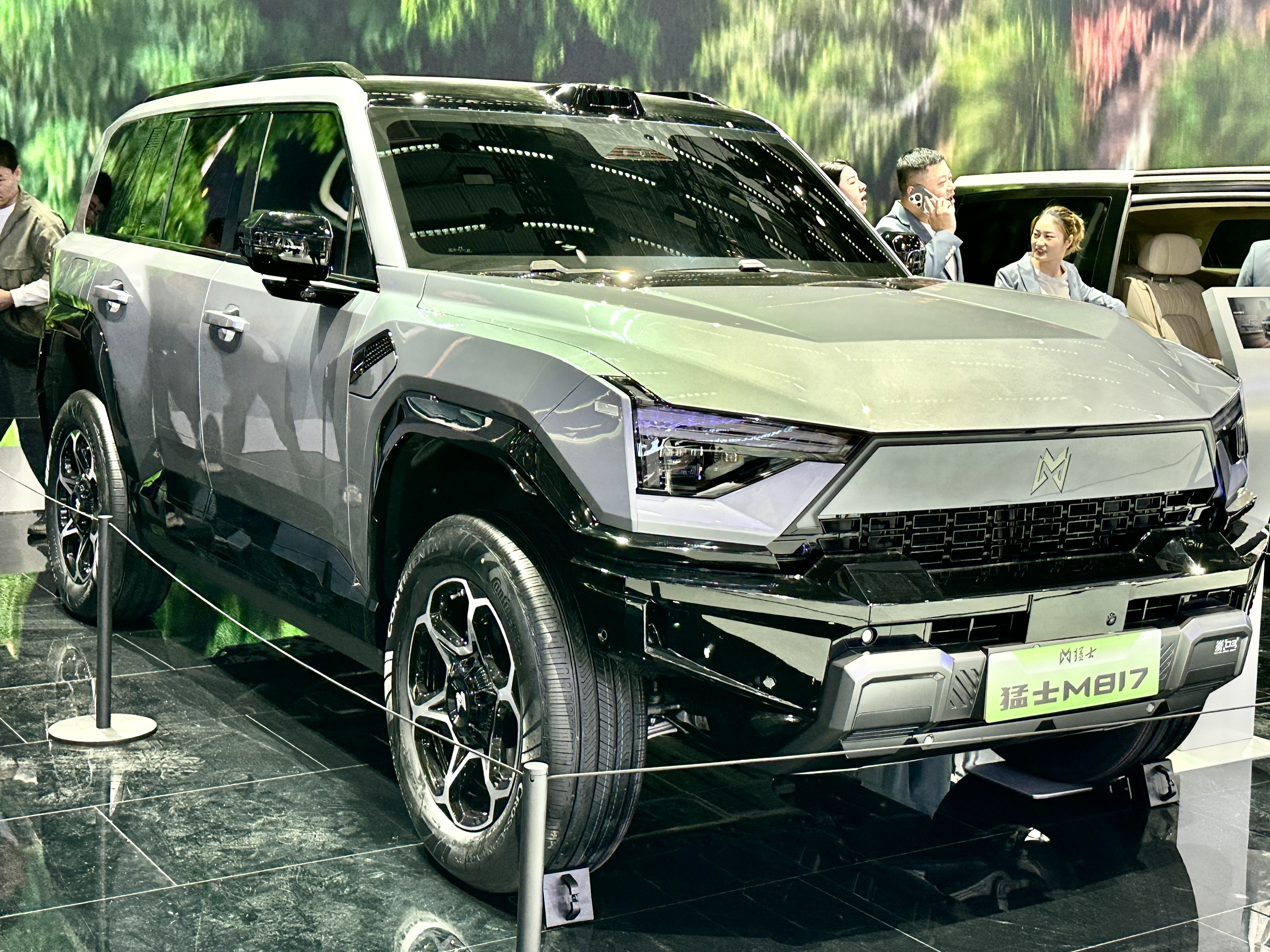
M-Hero M817

=== Current models of M-Hero (Xiangyang) ===
- M-Hero X700 (2026–present), mid-size SUV, PHEV
M-Hero X700
