= Nissan N7 =

Battery electric mid-size sedan

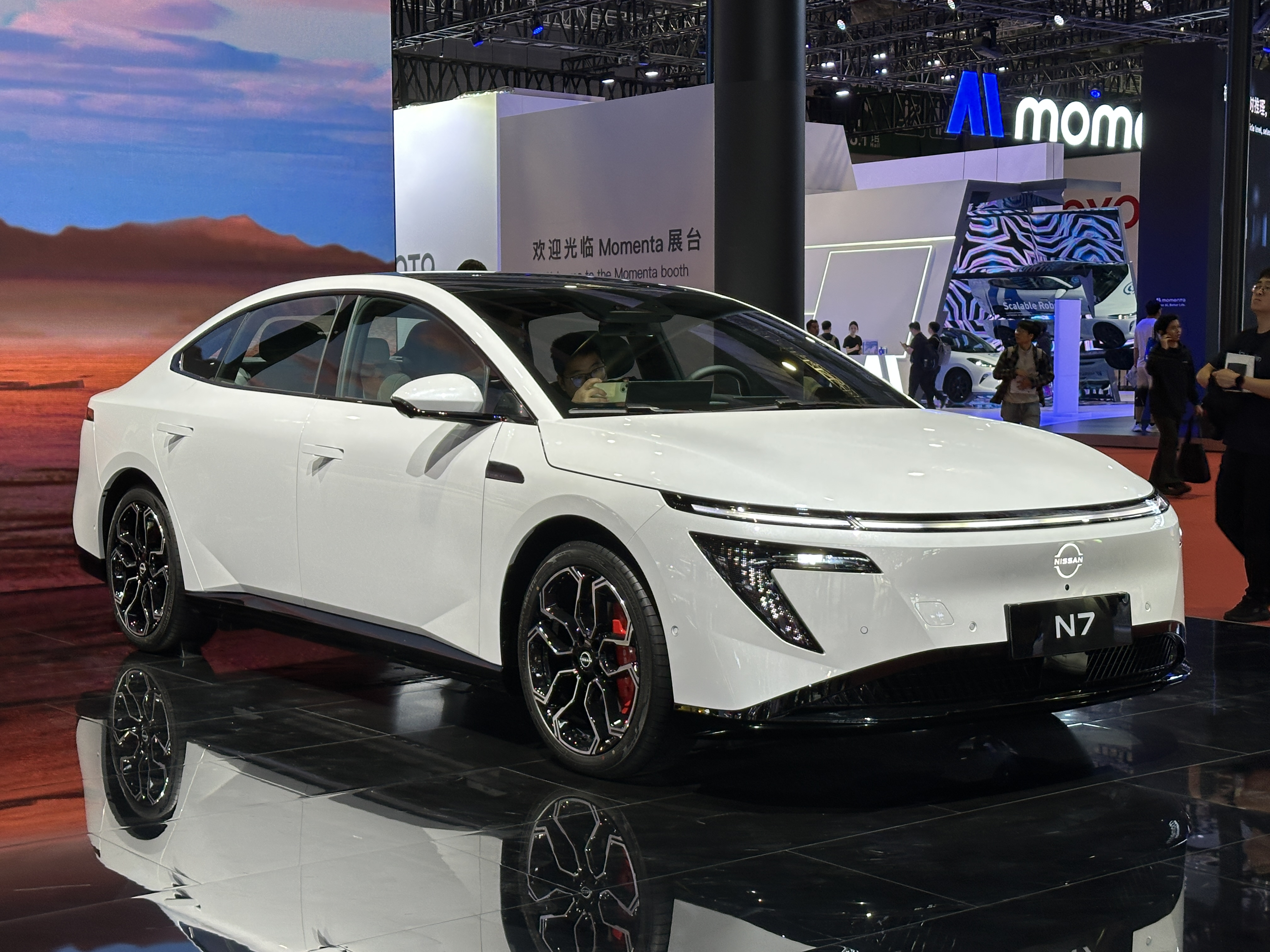
- Nissan N7 at Auto Shanghai 2025

Overview
- Manufacturer: Nissan
- Also called: Nissan Primera (export)
- Production: May 2025 – present
- Assembly: China: Guangzhou (Dongfeng Nissan)

Body and chassis
- Class: Mid-size car (D)
- Body style: 4-door sedan
- Layout: Front-motor, front-wheel-drive
- Platform: Tianyan Architecture
- Related: Nissan N6; Nissan NX8

Powertrain
- Electric motor: Permanent magnet synchronous
- Power output: 160–200 kW (215–268 hp; 218–272 PS)
- Battery: 58 kWh Sunwoda LFP; 73 kWh Sunwoda LFP
- Electric range: 510–635 km (317–395 mi) (CLTC)

Dimensions
- Wheelbase: 2,915 mm (114.8 in)
- Length: 4,930 mm (194.1 in)
- Width: 1,895 mm (74.6 in)
- Height: 1,487 mm (58.5 in)
- Curb weight: 1,837–1,863 kg (4,050–4,107 lb)

The Nissan N7 is a battery electric mid-size sedan produced by Nissan for the Chinese market through the Dongfeng Nissan joint venture. The car is exported as the Nissan Primera EV.

== Overview ==
Rear view

Interior

The N7 was previewed by Epoch concept in March 2024.

The N7 is the first model built based on the Tianyan Architecture, a car platform developed in China that underpins EV, PHEV, and EREV platforms.

The N7 was launched on 28 April 2025 at Auto Shanghai 2025, with deliveries beginning in China on 15 May. It is one of several models included in Nissan's "The Arc" mid-term plan, which will see Dongfeng Nissan's joint venture accelerate the launch of hybrid and electric vehicles in China. The strategy calls for a total of 30 models worldwide by 2027, including seven vehicles for the United States.

The exterior of N7 follows Nissan's V-Motion design language, and it has a drag coefficient of 0.208 C_{d}. The front and rear lights feature customizable light panels consisting of 710 individually-addressable LEDs at the front, and 882 at the rear. The infotainment system consists of a 15.6-inch 2.5K touchscreen running NISSAN OS and is powered by a Snapdragon 8155 SoC for standard models. Higher variants are equipped with Snapdragon 8295P SoC and an ADAS system developed in a collaboration between Dongfeng-Nissan and Momenta.

The N7 is powered by a choice of two Dongfeng-made motors, the base model receiving a 160 kW (215 hp; 218 PS) unit, while higher trims receive a 200 kW (268 hp; 272 PS) motor, both powering the front wheels. Power is supplied by a Sunwoda LFP battery.

== Powertrain ==
Type	Battery	Layout	Electric motor	Power	Torque	Range (claimed)	Calendar years
Type	Battery	Layout	Electric motor	Power	Torque	CLTC	Calendar years
510	58 kWh Sunwoda LFP	FWD	TZ200XS2JD PMSM	160 kW (215 hp; 218 PS)	305 N⋅m (31.1 kg⋅m; 225 lb⋅ft)	510–540 km (317–336 mi)	2025–present
625	73 kWh Sunwoda LFP	FWD	TZ200XS3JD PMSM	200 kW (268 hp; 272 PS)	305 N⋅m (31.1 kg⋅m; 225 lb⋅ft)	625–635 km (388–395 mi)	2025–present

== Markets ==
=== Philippines ===
The N7 was first unveiled in the Philippines at the Philippine International Motor Show on 4 June 2026 as the Nissan Primera. It was officially launched on 6 November 2026 alongside the Nissan Navara Pro plug-in hybrid pickup truck.

== Sales ==
18 days after its launch on 15 May, Dongfeng Nissan announced the N7 had received over 10,000 firm orders at a delivery ceremony. According to Dongfeng Nissan, 70% of buyers were either first-time car owners or were switching from different brands, 71% of customers placed orders after a single test drive, and over 60% of orders were for the top Max trim with Super Comfort Package. After 34 days, the N7 received 17,215 orders, and 20,000 firm orders after 50 days. In June 2025, Nissan announced it would sell the N7 in overseas markets as Primera EV.

Year	China
2025	45,216
