= M-Hero 917 =

Full-size luxury SUV

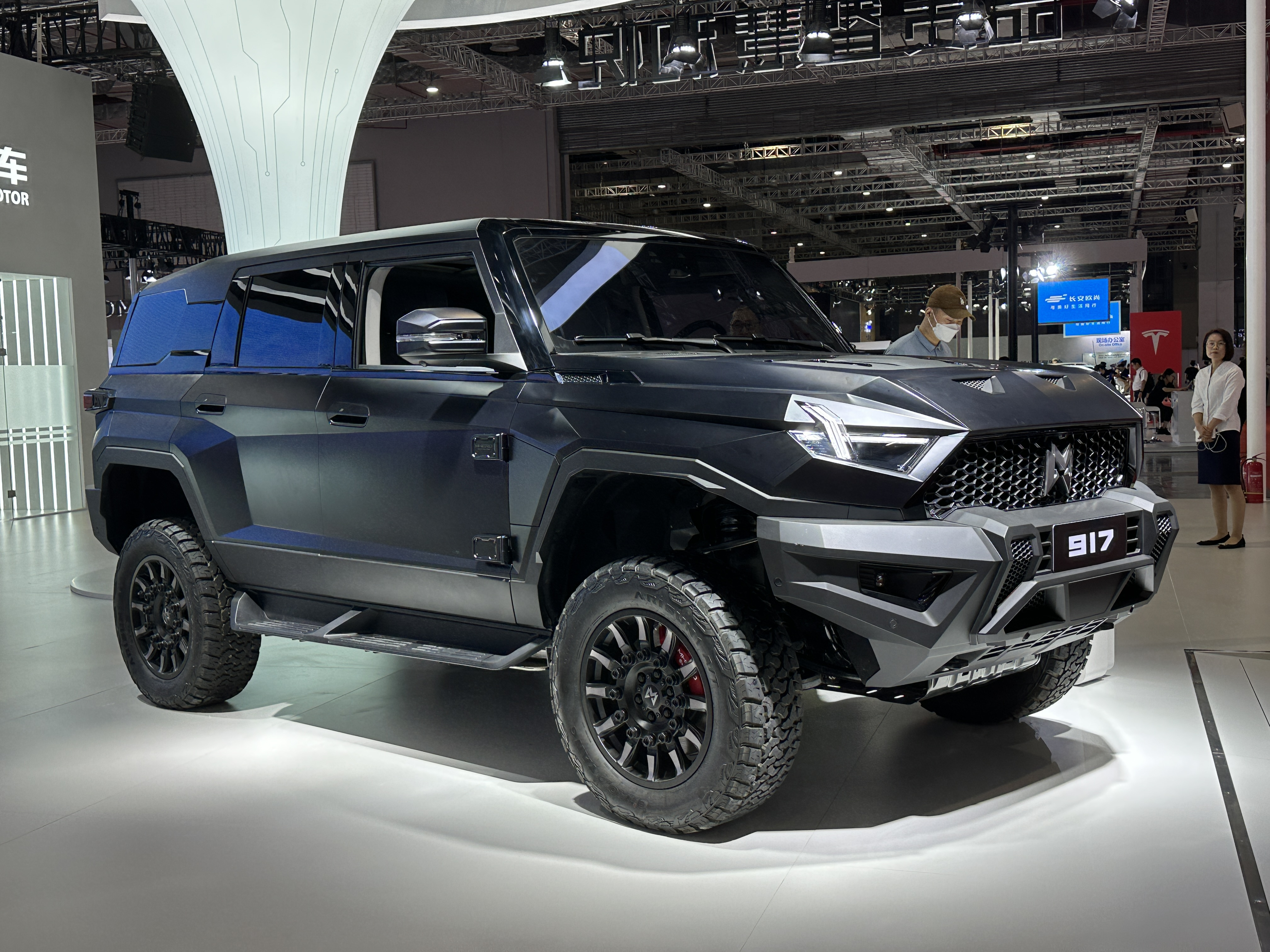

Overview
- Manufacturer: M-Hero
- Also called: MHERO 1 (export)
- Production: 2023–present
- Assembly: China: Wuhan, Hubei

Body and chassis
- Class: Full-size luxury SUV (F)
- Body style: 5-door SUV
- Layout: Dual-motor, four-wheel-drive (EV); Front-motor, four-wheel-drive (EREV); Quad-motor, Individual wheel drive
- Platform: M-Tech (Mengshi Intelligent Off-Road Architecture); MORA
- Related: M-Hero M817

Powertrain
- Engine: 1.5 L DFMC15TP1 turbo I4 petrol engine (EREV)
- Electric motor: 800 kW (1,073 hp; 1,088 PS) permanent magnet (EV); 600 kW (805 hp; 816 PS) permanent magnet (EREV)
- Battery: 142.7 kWh (514 MJ) (EV); 66 kWh (240 MJ) (EREV)
- Electric range: 505 km (314 mi) (EV); 200 km (120 mi) (EREV, pure electric range)

Dimensions
- Wheelbase: 2,950 mm (116.1 in)
- Length: 4,987 mm (196.3 in)
- Width: 2,080 mm (81.9 in)
- Height: 1,935 mm (76.2 in)
- Curb weight: 3,130–3,293 kg (6,900–7,260 lb)

The M-Hero 917 (Chinese: 猛士917; pinyin: Mengshi 917) is a full-size luxury SUV manufactured by the Dongfeng Motor Corporation under the M-Hero brand. The 917, which is the first vehicle under the M-Hero brand, was introduced in August 2022 and launched the following year. It is also part of the Dongfeng Mengshi family of off-road vehicles.

== Overview ==
The 917 was previewed by the Mengshi M-Terrain EV SUV Concept. The prototype was introduced in August 2022 during the launch of the independent M-Hero brand, with the production 917 being unveiled in January 2023. Production started on 5 April and the vehicle was launched for the Chinese market on 25 August 2023.

== Specifications ==
The 917 comes in two versions, the BEV and the EREV. The BEV version is equipped four electric motors with a battery capacity of 142.7 kWh and its maximum range reached up to 505 km (314 mi). The four motors drive each of four wheels which produce 197 kW (264 hp; 268 PS) respectively, giving a total power of 797 kW (1,069 hp; 1,084 PS).

The EREV version has an 1.5L inline-four turbocharged petrol engine as a generator which has 145 kW (194 hp; 197 PS), powering three motors (one on front axle and two on rear axle), giving 600 kW (805 hp; 816 PS) of power output combined. The battery capacity of EREV version is 66 kWh which enable the vehicle to drive 200 km (120 mi) on pure electric range.

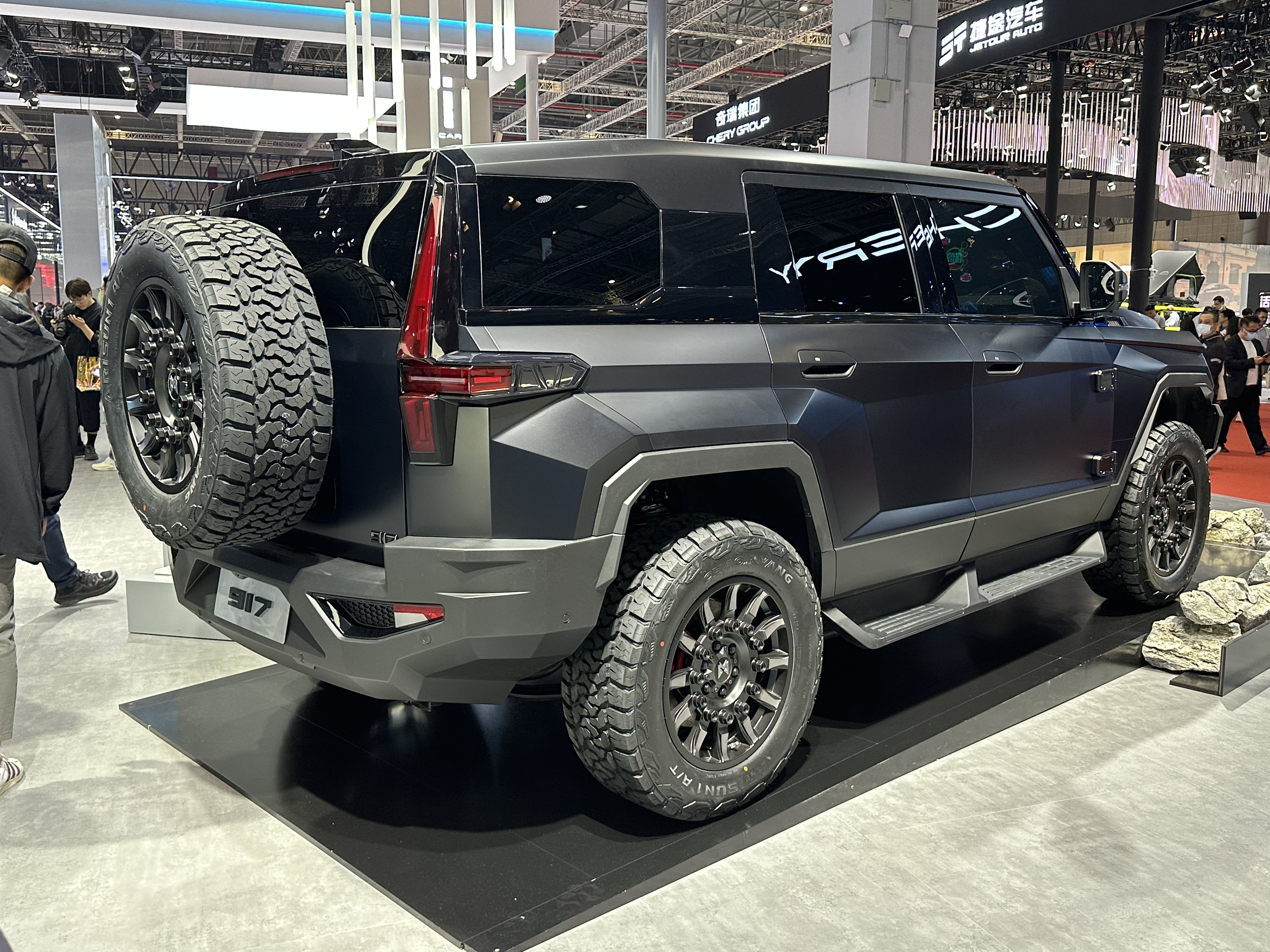
Rear view

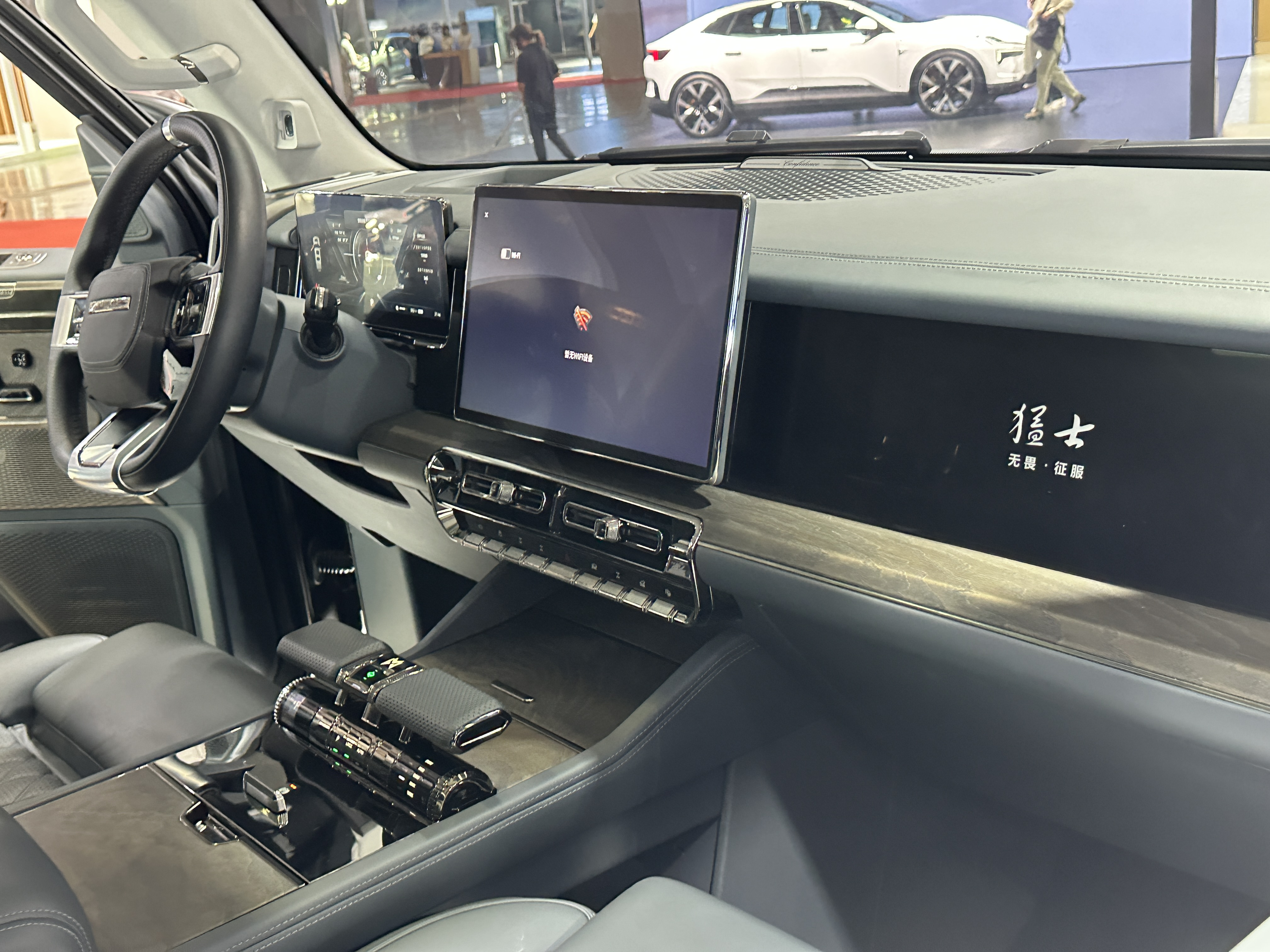
Interior

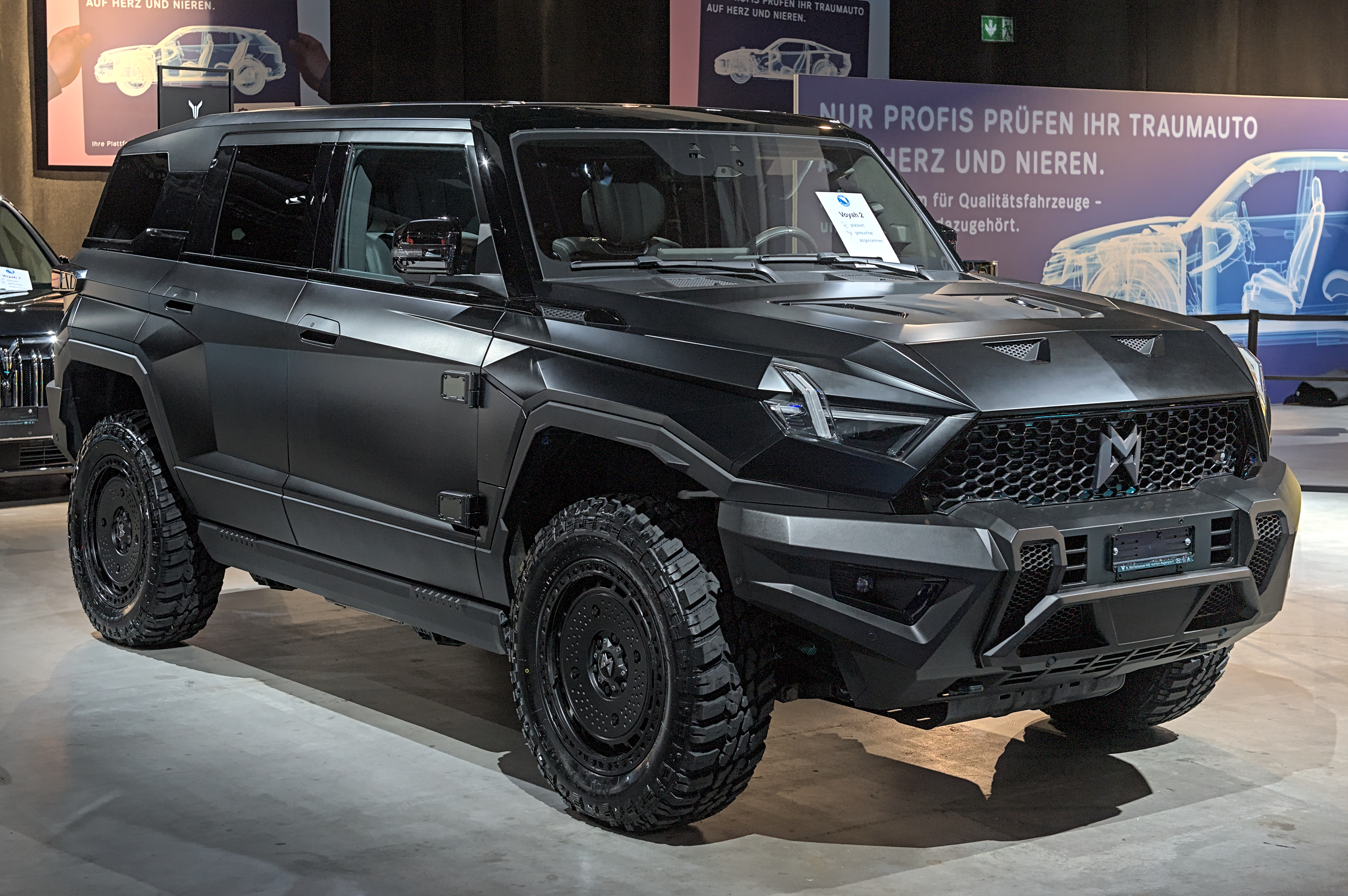
The MHERO 1 at Auto Zürich 2025.

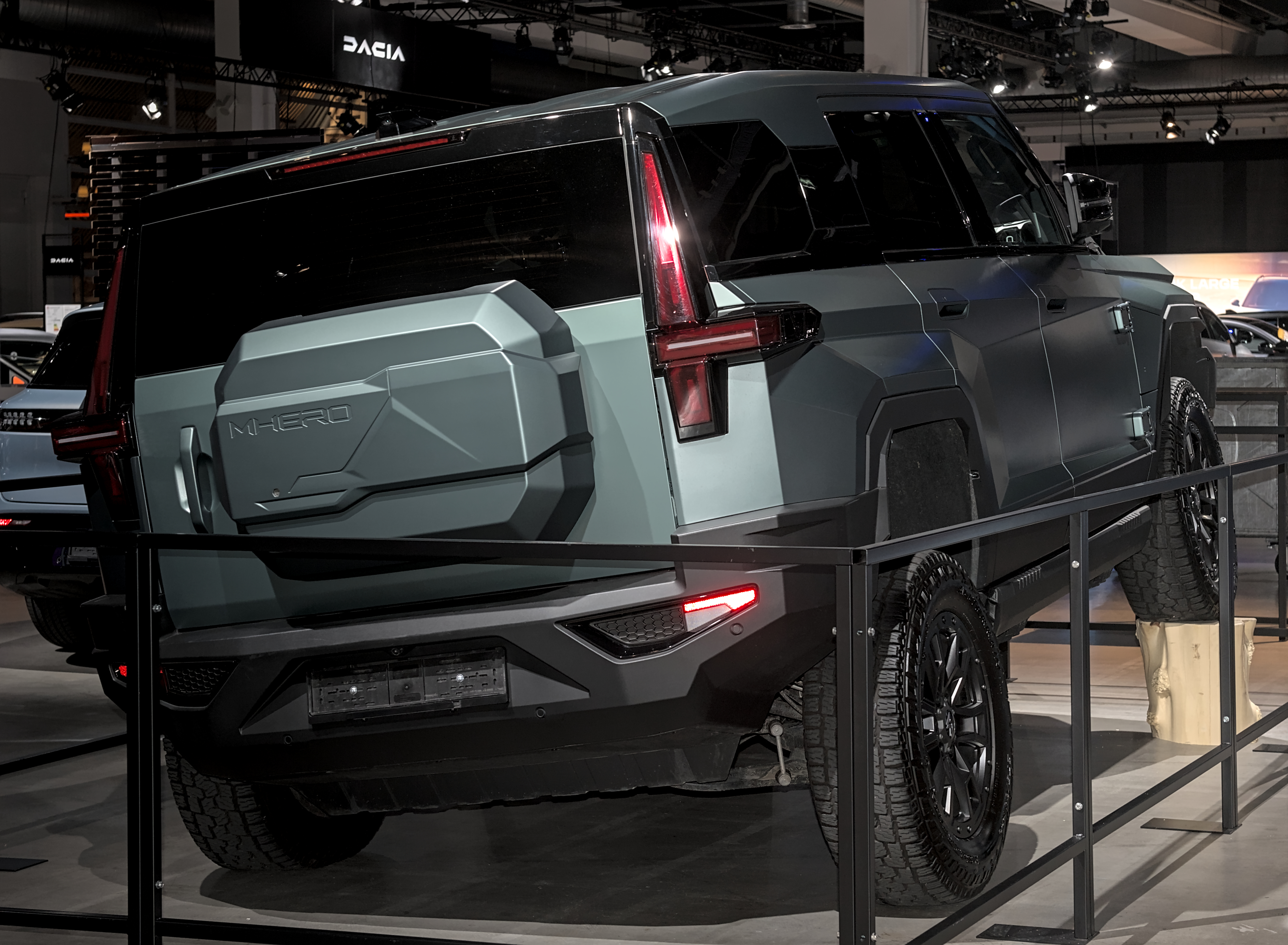
Rear view

== Sales ==
| Year | China | | |
| Year | 917 EREV | 917 BEV | Total |
|---|---|---|---|
| 2023 | 520 | 49 | 569 |
| 2024 | 1,130 | 31 | 1,161 |
| 2025 | 629 | 13 | 642 |
