= Nissan N6 =

Plug-in hybrid mid-size sedan

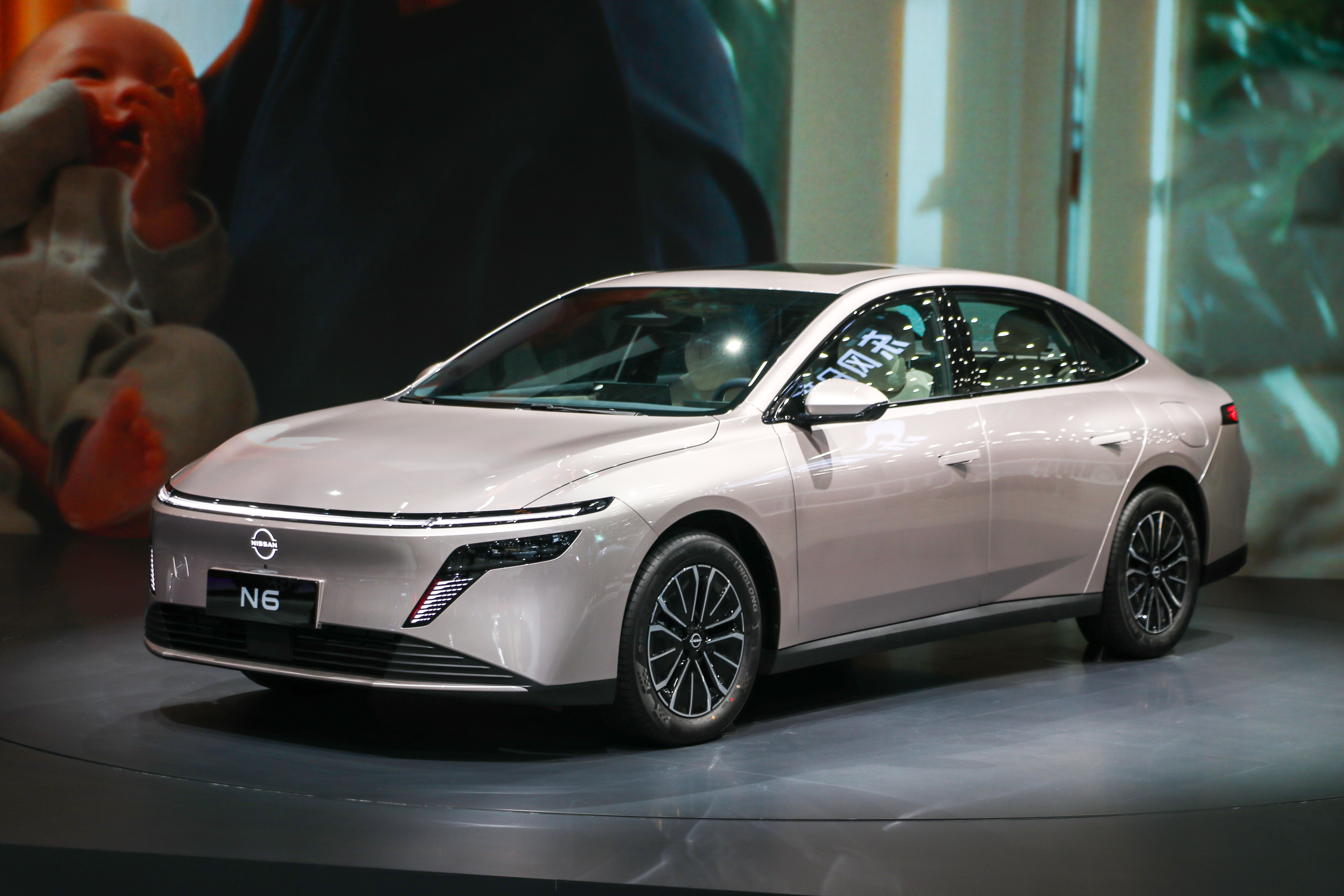
- The Nissan N6 at Auto Guangzhou 2025.

Overview
- Manufacturer: Nissan
- Production: December 2025 – present
- Assembly: China: Guangzhou (Dongfeng Nissan)

Body and chassis
- Class: Mid-size car (D)
- Body style: 4-door sedan
- Layout: Front-engine, front-motor, front-wheel-drive
- Platform: Tianyan Architecture
- Related: Nissan N7; Nissan NX8

Powertrain
- Engine: Petrol plug-in hybrid: 1.5 L NR15 I4
- Hybrid drivetrain: Plug-in hybrid
- Battery: 20.3 kWh CATL LFP; 21.1 kWh Rept Battero LFP
- Electric range: 170–180 km (106–112 mi) (CLTC)

Dimensions
- Wheelbase: 2,815 mm (110.8 in)
- Length: 4,831 mm (190.2 in)
- Width: 1,885 mm (74.2 in)
- Height: 1,491 mm (58.7 in)

The Nissan N6 (Chinese: 日产N6; pinyin: Rìchǎn N6) is a plug-in hybrid mid-size sedan produced by Nissan under the Dongfeng Nissan joint venture since December 2025.

== Overview ==
Nissan N6 rear

The N6 is the second model in Nissan's N series following the N7. While the N7 is fully electric, the N6 is a plug-in hybrid. It uses similar dimensions as the Maxima but is 2.6 in (66 mm) shorter in length while it is 2.2 in (56 mm) taller and 1.0 in (26 mm) wider, and has a 3.9 in (100 mm) shorter wheelbase than the N7.

It was unveiled in Beijing alongside the Teana on October 17, 2025. The N6 shares its platform with the N7. The NR15 engine used in the N6 began production earlier in the month.

The N6 launched on December 1, 2025. Nissan is considering selling the N6 in Southeast Asia, the Middle East, and some parts of Latin America.

=== Design ===
The N6 uses a similar design to that of the N7. There's a full-width light bar, boomerang-shaped headlights, an illuminated Nissan logo, a closed-off grille, hidden door handles, and the NISSAN wordmark embedded into the rear light bar. The exhaust pipe is also tucked away.

The use of Nissan's V-Motion grille design continues with the N6.

=== Features ===
The features of the N6 vary by trim level. The Pro trim offers an electric sunroof, ambient cabin lighting, a 10.25-inch digital instrument cluster, and a 14.6-inch infotainment screen, meanwhile the Max+ trim uses a larger 15.6-inch touchscreen and Nissan’s AI Zero-Pressure Cloud Carpet Seat for the driver. The seat integrates 49 pressure sensors and provides 14-way electric adjustment, leg and lumbar support, heating, ventilation, and massage functions. All trims use Qualcomm Snapdragon chips and processors, with lower trims using the 8155 processor and higher trims using the 8755 chip.

== Powertrain ==
The N6 uses a 1.5-liter naturally aspirated inline-4 petrol engine codenamed NR15 producing 101 horsepower (75 kW; 102 PS). It is paired with an electric motor producing 208 horsepower (155 kW; 211 PS) and 320 N⋅m (236 lb⋅ft) of torque and a lithium iron phosphate battery. It has a 0–100 km/h (62 mph) acceleration time of 6.8 seconds.

The base N6's battery is 21.1 kWh pack supplied by Rept Battero and is claimed to be the largest in its segment, and can charge from 30–80% in 20 minutes. The top variant is equipped with a 20.3 kWh pack supplied by CATL, and can charge from 30–80% in 17 minutes.

On a full charge, the base N6 has a CLTC range of 112 miles (180 km) on electricity alone, and the top variant is rated for 106 miles (170 km). After the battery depletes, the NR15 engine kicks in as a generator.

== Sales ==
Year	China
2025	7,684
