= M-Hero X700 =

Plug-in hybrid mid-size luxury SUV

Overview
- Manufacturer: M-Hero
- Production: 2026–present
- Assembly: China: Xiangyang, Hubei

Body and chassis
- Class: Mid-size luxury SUV (E)
- Body style: 5-door SUV
- Layout: Range-extended EV: Front-engine, rear-motor, rear-wheel-drive; Plug-in hybrid: Front-engine, dual-motor, all-wheel-drive
- Platform: Tianyuan Architecture
- Chassis: Unibody
- Related: Nissan Terrano PHEV

Powertrain
- Engine: Gasoline PHEV or EREV: 1.5 L DMFC15TPE turbo I4; 1.5 L DMFC15TE3 turbo I4
- Electric motor: 190 kW DY42TZ225190 PMSM (PHEV, front); 215 kW TZ225XYH11 PMSM (PHEV, rear)
- Transmission: Single-speed gear reduction (EREV); 1-speed DHT
- Hybrid drivetrain: Power-split (PHEV) or series (EREV)
- Battery: 51.46 kWh CATL LFP (EREV); 68.1 kWh CATL LFP (PHEV)
- Range: 1,036–1,120 km (644–696 mi) (WLTP)
- Electric range: 215–285 km (134–177 mi) (WLTP); 285–360 km (177–224 mi) (CLTC)
- Plug-in charging: DC: 20–80% in 18 minutes

Dimensions
- Wheelbase: 2,920 mm (115.0 in)
- Length: 5,035 mm (198.2 in)
- Width: 1,999 mm (78.7 in)
- Height: 1,910 mm (75.2 in)
- Curb weight: 2,750 kg (6,063 lb)

The M-Hero X700 (Chinese: 猛士X700; pinyin: Měngshì X700) is a plug-in hybrid and range-extended mid-size luxury SUV manufactured by the M-Hero Automotive Technology subsidiary of the Dongfeng Motor Corporation. It was developed in collaboration with Huawei Qiankun and is the first M-Hero vehicle to use a unibody chassis.

== Overiew ==
The X700 went on sale on October 25, 2026.

=== Design ===
The X700 features boxy styling with straight body lines. The front features a lightbar and the rear taillights is an upright design. It is equipped with optional power retracting running boards and a side-opening tailgate with a rear spare tire storage box featuring an optional display.

=== Features ===
The interior features a 10.25-inch digital instrument cluster supplemented by an optional 30-inch heads-up display which can be upgraded to a 74-inch Huawei XHUD AR-HUD, and either a single or dual 15.6-inch 2.5K-resolution 1000 nit-brightness touchscreens serving as the central infotainment display and optional passenger entertainment displays, running Huawei's Harmony Space 6 software. It is equipped with a 21-speaker 7.1.4 surround sound system, an opening panoramic sunroof, 7-litre (0.2 cu ft) refrigerator in the center console, and seatback tables for the back row. It features eucalyptus wood trim and a crystal drive mode selector dial with accompanying physical buttons for drivetrain control. The front seats feature active side bolsters and the front passenger seat is capable of 127° 'zero-gravity' recline mode, and the front row and outboard rear seats are all equipped with heating, ventilation, and 10-point massage functions along with power backrest and lumbar adjustment.

The rear seats fold fully flat to provide a 2.77 m^{2} (29.8 sq ft) flat floor and total rear cargo volume of 850 litres (30.0 cu ft).

It is equipped with the Huawei Qiankun ADS 5 ADAS system, with the standard ADS 5 Pro system's sensor suite consisting of a Limera solid-state in-cabin LiDAR, 3 mmWave radars, 11 cameras, and 12 ultrasonic sensors. Higher trims are equipped with the ADS 5 Max system, which features Huawei's latest 896-line roof-moutned LiDAR sensor. Both versions are capable of supervised Level 2 autonomous driving in highway and urban conditions.

Rear view

Interior

== Powertrain ==
The X700 is offered as either a plug-in hybrid or range-extended electric vehicle.

Both the range-extended and plug-in hybrid versions of the X700 use a 1.5-liter turbocharged inline 4 gasoline engine with a 14:1 compression ratio and direct injection, codenamed DMFC15TPE and DMFC15TE3 respectively. The range-extended version produces 121 hp (90 kW; 123 PS), with a gross output of 127 hp (95 kW; 129 PS), and 200 N⋅m (148 lb⋅ft) of torque, while the plug-in hybrid version produces 148 hp (110 kW; 150 PS), with a gross power output of 154 hp (115 kW; 156 PS), and 220 N⋅m (162 lb⋅ft) of torque.

The range-extender is only available in rear-wheel drive, with a permanent magnet synchronous motor (PMSM) outputting 288 hp (215 kW; 292 PS) and 380 N⋅m (280 lb⋅ft) of torque. The plug-in hybrid is equipped with a 1-speed series-parallel DHT transmission which drives the front wheels with a PMSM outputting 255 hp (190 kW; 259 PS) and 310 N⋅m (229 lb⋅ft) of torque, while the rear axle is driven by a PMSM outputting 288 hp (215 kW; 292 PS) and 410 N⋅m (302 lb⋅ft) of torque, for a system total power output of 694 hp (518 kW; 704 PS) and 940 N⋅m (693 lb⋅ft) of torque.

Plug-in hybrid models are equipped with a locking rear differential and virtual locking center differential, 2,500 kg (5,500 lb) towing capacity, and M-Hero claims it outputs up to 10,000 N⋅m (7,400 lb⋅ft) of wheel torque.

Both the range-extender and plug-in hybrid are available with a CATL-supplied 51.46 kWh LFP battery with 400-volt class power electronics as standard, providing WLTP range ratings of 244 km (152 mi) for the range-extender and 215–288 km (134–179 mi) for the plug-in hybrid. The plug-in hybrid can be upgraded with a 68.10 kWh LFP pack with 800-volt architecture with up to 285 km (177 mi) of WLTP electric range. Both battery packs are capable of recharging from 20–80% in 18 minutes.

Specifications
Model	Battery		Engine	Motor		Total system		Electric range		0–100 km/h (62 mph)	Top speed	Kerb weight
Model	Type	Weight	Engine	Power	Torque	Power	Torque	WLTP	CLTC	0–100 km/h (62 mph)	Top speed	Kerb weight
EREV	51.46 kWh LFP CATL	360 kg (794 lb)	DFMC15TPE 1.5 L I4 turbo; 121 hp (90 kW; 123 PS)	288 hp (215 kW; 292 PS)	380 N⋅m (280 lb⋅ft)	288 hp (215 kW; 292 PS)	380 N⋅m (280 lb⋅ft)	244 km (152 mi)	325 km (202 mi)	7.7 s	180 km/h (112 mph)	2,500 kg (5,512 lb)
PHEV	51.46 kWh LFP CATL	360 kg (794 lb)	DFMC15TE3 1.5 L I4 turbo; 148 hp (110 kW; 150 PS)	543 hp (405 kW; 551 PS)	720 N⋅m (531 lb⋅ft)	694 hp (518 kW; 704 PS)	940 N⋅m (693 lb⋅ft)	215–228 km (134–142 mi)	285 km (177 mi)	4.9 s	180 km/h (112 mph)	2,650 kg (5,842 lb)
PHEV	68.1 kWh LFP CATL	460 kg (1,014 lb)	DFMC15TE3 1.5 L I4 turbo; 148 hp (110 kW; 150 PS)	543 hp (405 kW; 551 PS)	720 N⋅m (531 lb⋅ft)	694 hp (518 kW; 704 PS)	940 N⋅m (693 lb⋅ft)	285 km (177 mi)	360 km (224 mi)	4.9 s	180 km/h (112 mph)	2,750 kg (6,063 lb)

== Suspension ==
The X700 uses double wishbone front and five-link independent rear suspension geometries, and is equipped with optional magnetorheological dampers and dual-chamber air suspension with 150 mm (5.9 in) of ride height adjustment for maximum of 328.8 mm (12.94 in) and wading depth of 700–800 mm (28–31 in). It has approach and departure angles of 37.5° and 38.3°, respectively, and a maximum gradeability of 100% (45°). It has a turning radius of 5.85 metres (19.2 ft).
