= Maextro S800 =

Full-size ultra-luxury sedan

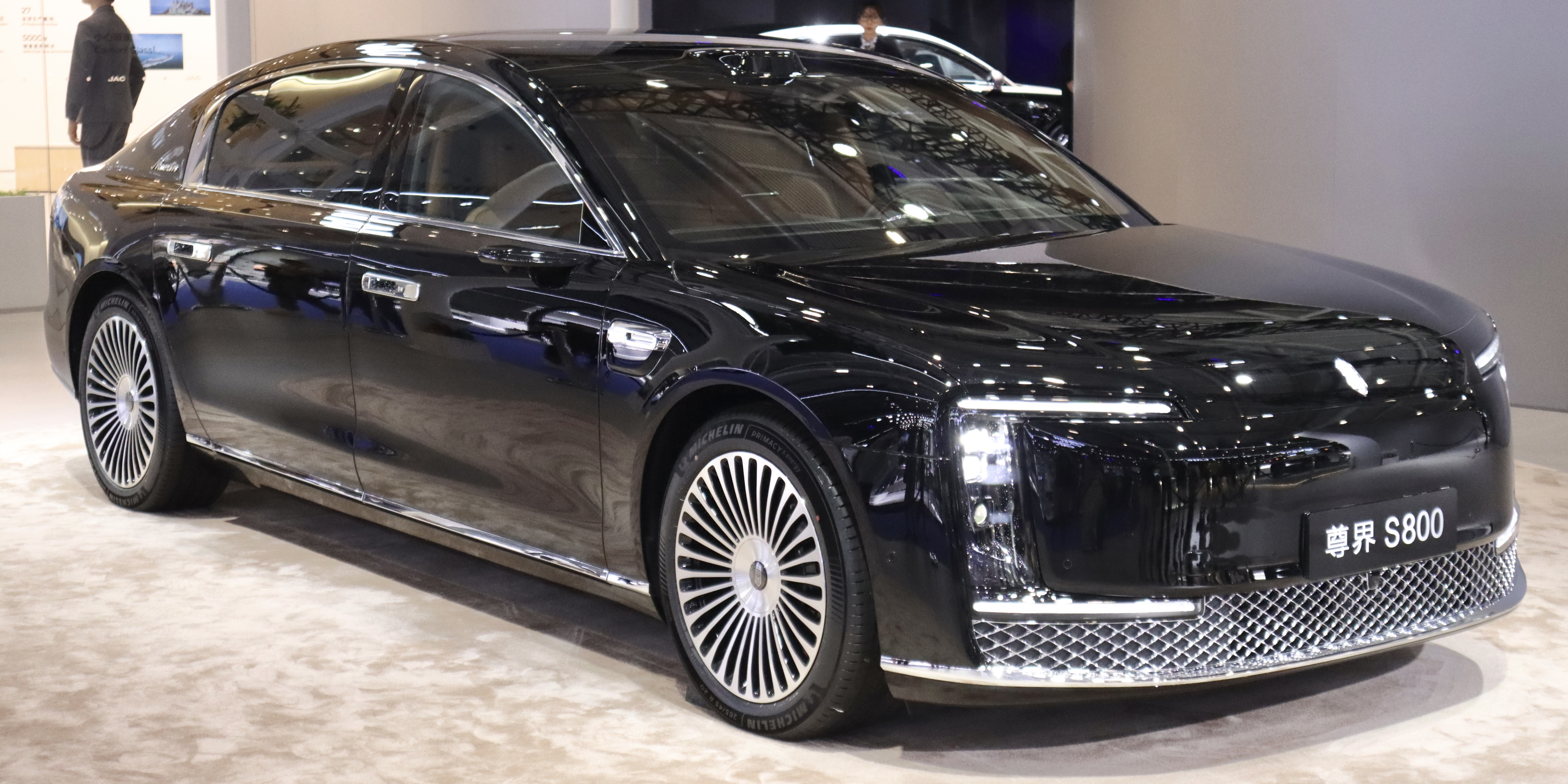

Overview
- Manufacturer: JAC Group
- Production: June 2025 – present
- Assembly: China: Feixi, Hefei, Anhui (Maextro Factory)

Body and chassis
- Class: Full-size ultra-luxury car (F)
- Body style: 4-door sedan
- Layout: Battery electric: Dual-motor, all-wheel-drive; Range-extended EV: Front-engine, dual-motor or tri-motor, all-wheel-drive
- Platform: Tuling Longxing

Powertrain
- Engine: Gasoline range extender: 1.5 L M8000PHD turbo I4; 1.5 L M8100PHD turbo I4 (Grand Design only)
- Power output: 390–635 kW (523–852 hp; 530–863 PS)
- Transmission: Single-speed gear reduction
- Battery: 63.3 kWh CATL NMC (TBA); 65 kWh CATL Freevoy NMC (EREV); 97 kWh CATL Qilin NMC (EV)
- Range: 1,155–1,333 km (718–828 mi) (EREV)
- Electric range: 650–670 km (400–420 mi) (EV); 340–400 km (210–250 mi) (EREV)
- Plug-in charging: DC: 5C (EV); 6C (EREV)

Dimensions
- Wheelbase: 3,370 mm (132.7 in)
- Length: 5,480 mm (215.7 in)
- Width: 2,000 mm (78.7 in)
- Height: 1,536 mm (60.5 in)
- Curb weight: 2,604–2,851 kg (5,741–6,285 lb)

The Maextro S800 (Chinese: 尊界 S800; pinyin: Zūnjiè S800) is a battery electric and range-extended full-size ultra-luxury sedan manufactured by JAC Group since 2025 under the Maextro brand in collaboration with HIMA, Huawei's multi-brand automotive alliance. It is positioned as HIMA's flagship vehicle and is the first vehicle from the Maextro brand.

== History ==
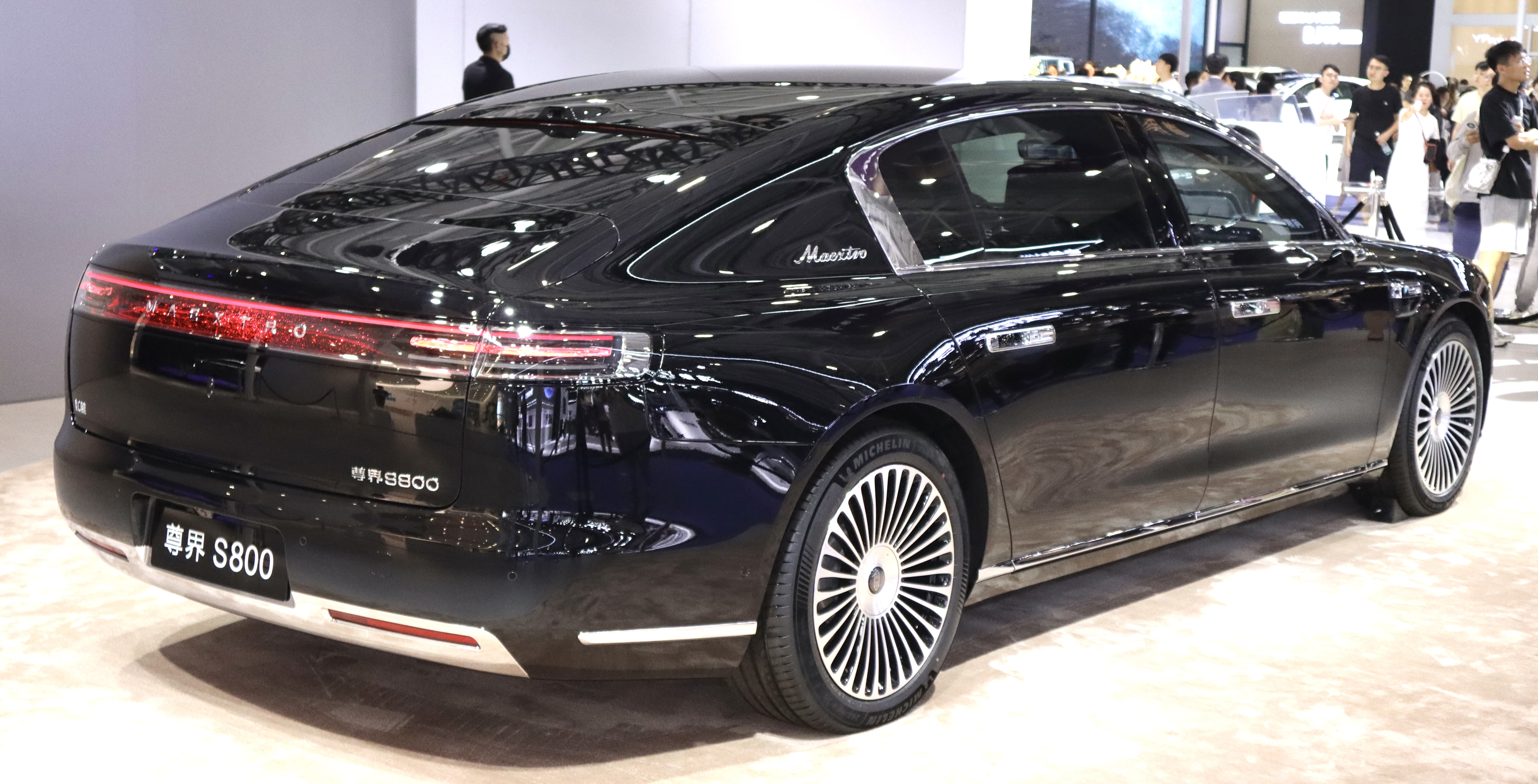
Rear view

On November 26, 2024, Huawei initially launched the Maextro S800 at a Huawei Mate brand ceremony by Device BG chairman Yu Chengdong (Richard Yu) and JAC Group chairman and president Xiang Xingchu, where pre-orders were opened in China. More details were revealed at the Maextro brand technology event on February 20, 2025, which focused on showcasing the new technologies Huawei developed for the vehicle. The interior of the S800 was revealed on April 25, 2025 at Auto Shanghai 2025. It was officially released on May 30, 2025 at Auto Shenzhen and priced at 708,000 yuan to 1,018,000 yuan. Mass production of the S800 commenced on 18 June 2025. The first batch of deliveries began on June 24, 2025 with the Pioneer Plan, which is limited to 599 units and specific configurations, with general deliveries beginning in mid-August 2025.

The S800 is the first model jointly developed by Huawei and JAC Group. During the cooperation between the two parties, JAC stated that it committed its top-quality resources to Maextro and promoted it as its top project. The Maextro S800 is built on the second-generation Tuling platform, marketed as Tuling Longxing platform (Chinese: 途灵龙行平台; lit. 'dragon travel platform'), a chassis architecture that has undergone five years of development, which incorporates advanced capabilities in intelligent driving and cockpit integration. The platform is intended to support sedans, SUVs and minivans with a gross weight of 3–3.8 tons with 2–4 motor powertrains with outputs between 480–1,300 hp (360–970 kW; 490–1,320 PS).

== Specifications ==
The S800 introduces the "Zhizun New Luxury" design language, and adheres to a design standard dubbed as "8S", which has consists of the criteria of super cruise, maneuverability, information perception, privacy, satellite network connectivity, AI assistance, active protection, and reliability.

The exterior features two-tone paint, stationary hubcaps, and elements such as vertical and horizontal headlights with starry elements crafted with crystal and metallic finishes. Maextro says it follows 'Heaven, Earth, and Human Harmony' design philosophy, and uses the 'Starry Sky' design language, including 'Starry Splendour' headlights which contain 1,296 LEDs to create a starburst pattern, flush-mounted 'Star-picking' door handles which contain fiber-optic strands to deliver a constellation effect, and 'Nebula Canvas' taillights which have layered elements for a holographic nebula pattern. Maextro claims the S800's body shape follows the golden ratio with a fastback profile, allowing for a drag coefficient of 0.206 C_{d} when equipped with low-drag wheels and electronic side mirrors, or 0.219 C_{d} with standard wheels and conventional mirrors. The doors are power opening with an angle of up to 77°, and automatically adjust their angle to avoid colliding with obstacles using the onboard mmWave and LiDAR sensors. It has a choice of 20- or 21-inch multi-spoke or dish-style wheels. It is available in four two-tone paint finishes: Dawn Gold & Black, Cloud Silver & Purple, Wilderness Beige & Gold, and Soaring Cloud White & Ink, and two solid colors: Starshine Black and Dawnlight Cloud.

The interior employs natural materials, some of which were claimed to be processed through over 100 steps for precision craftsmanship. The S800's dashboard features a continuous panel which integrates three screens serving as the instrument cluster, central infotainment system, and passenger entertainment display. It is also equipped with a 76-inch head-up display, and the door panels contain digital side mirror displays flanking the dashboard along with seat controls. The center console features cupholders and active cooled wireless charging pads.

The rear row has two seats split by a multifunction armrest, which contains collapsible folding tables with integrated makeup mirrors, a refrigerated drinks compartment which also stores complimentary stemware, heated and cooled cupholders, active-cooled wireless charging pads, mute and blackout buttons, and a fingerprint-secured safe. The doors contain physical power seat controls along with a detachable touchscreen remote to control the each seat's functions, including heating, ventilation, massaging, climate controls, window dimming, and 'zero-gravity' 148.5° recline functions, which can also fold down the front passenger seat for use as a footrest. The rear seats also have access to a projector display with a retracting screen, an illuminated star pattern on the ceiling, and lighting which can change color temperature based on ambient conditions.

The interior uses materials such as genuine leather, wood grain, and crystal, and is available in three upholstery color schemes: two-tone purple and white, brown, and two-tone brown and white, and can be matched with complimentary exterior paint colors. It has a 2,920-watt 43-speaker HUAWEI Sound Ultimate (Chinese: HUAWEI SOUND ULTIMATE 非凡系列) 7.5.10 audio system with 10 ceiling-mounted speakers, which features two tweeters and two midrange speakers integrated into each seat's headrest and is capable of isolating sound between the front and rear rows. The S800 receives a custom QQ Music app in the infotainment system called the Premium Edition, which includes a custom black and gold skin, compatibility with the vehicle's unique audio system, and custom content. Each seat also has a lighting system which adjusts based on the passenger's posture, and can be gesture controlled. It has a 445 L (15.7 cu ft) trunk lined with tufted carpet.

=== Technologies ===
The S800 is the first to be equipped with dual-megapixel headlights, ActiveSafe zero-gravity seats, HUAWEI Sound Ultimate sound system, Harmony ALPS cockpit 2.0, 800V Xuexiao Range-extended platform, ultra-high-density 800V high-voltage pure electric platform, HUAWEI Jujing Battery Platform 2.0, HUAWEI ADS® 4, Angel active safety protection, Gemini redundant safety design, Xinghe Communications and other technologies.

The S800 is developed to be ready for L3 advanced driver assistance standards by utilizing ADS 4 advanced intelligent driving assistance system. The ADS introduces advanced parking features such as automatic parking, automatic summoning, and customizable parking preferences. Its 32-sensor suite features Huawei's proprietary 192-line LiDAR sensors, which Huawei claims increases perception distance by 60% in low-visibility weather conditions, reducing the system's reaction time by 40%, and are located on each side of the vehicle. It also includes 3 forward-facing and 2 rear-corner mmWave radars, 7 high-definition cameras, 4 surround view cameras, and 12 ultrasonic sensors. The use of deep learning technology by the system is claimed to improve recognition of road environments, enabling more accurate and responsive decision-making. The system also benefits from Huawei's Instinct Safety Network and extensive training data, updated every five days, with cloud computing power reaching 7.5E FLOPS.

The S800 has an active suspension and rear-wheel steering with an angle of up to 12 degrees. It has the ADS road perception system, which uses the ADAS sensor suite to detect upcoming slippery and bumpy road conditions and adjust steering, suspension, and torque distribution accordingly. It has Huawei's Xmotion body control system, which allows the active suspension to react to bumps in advance, and reduces body roll, lift, and dive in conjunction with the rear-wheel steering. The rear-wheel steering system allows for a 5.05 m (16.6 ft) turning radius, or 3.8 m (12 ft) in a special mode; it also allows for crab walking at 16 degrees. It has an adaptive headlight system that can highlight the vehicle's lane trajectory on the road, and can highlight road users such as pedestrians while blocking light towards vehicles to avoid blinding drivers.

The vehicle can detect an incoming collision using the ADAS system, and will prepare the vehicle by adjusting the body posture, seating position, tension the seatbelts, close the windows, and unlock the doors. The vehicle has dual low-voltage batteries, allowing the doors and other functions to operate even if one battery is damaged in a collision. The S800 debuts the Xinghe vehicle connectivity system, which can switch networks and preload maps based on predicted signal strength, and features a vehicle-mounted satellite communication system that extends network signals up to 30 meters beyond the vehicle.

In March 2026, a version of the S800 equipped with an 896-line dual-beam-path image-grade LiDAR was released. This version adopts a dual-beam-path architecture, providing an ultra-wide perception range and covering more driving scenarios. Furthermore, it can identify smaller target obstacles and low-reflectivity obstacles. The suggested retail price for this model starts at 728,000 yuan.

== Grand Design ==
On May 18, 2026, HIMA released official images of the Maextro S800 Grand Design (Chinese: 尊界S800 Grand Design 典藏大观) and announced the color "Yuanshan Qingdai". It was launched on June 25, 2026, with deliveries beginning on 31 August 2026.

It features a gold badge, golden pinstriping along the two-tone paint border, 21-inch forged wheels with a gold border, and exclusive Grand Design badging. The interior features semi-aniline leather upholstery with unique hand-stitched embroidery, color-matched long-pile wool carpeting, and genuine wood trim inlays. The available color schemes match the exterior and the interior, and include Distant Mountain Indigo, Rising Sunlight Gold, and Golden Radiance–Mysterious Ink. The pure electric version receives a new larger 120 kWh battery which provides 780 kilometres (485 mi) of range.

== Powertrain ==
The S800 is available with either a dual or triple-motor drivetrain, with power supplied by either purely from a battery, or supplemented by a gasoline range extender. The battery in all versions use a NMC cathode chemistry and are supplied by CATL. All motors used are supplied by Huawei.

The range extender is a 1.5-liter turbocharged gasoline engine codenamed M8000PHD which is not mechanically connected to the wheels. It uses Huawei's Xuexiao 2.0 range-extender battery platform, a 63.25 kWh battery pack and 800V electrical architecture capable of 6C DC charging at up to 390 kW, allowing for a 10–80% charge time of 10.5 minutes and achieving an electric-only CLTC range rating between 340–400 kilometres (210–250 mi) depending on the configuration, and a 1,200–1,333 kilometres (746–828 mi) combined range rating with a 50 L (13 U.S. gal) petrol tank. Maextro says the engine has a 80 kW (107 hp; 109 PS) generator, allowing for a steady-state speed of 150 km/h (93 mph) even with a depleted battery. All configurations have a 160 kW (215 hp; 218 PS) front motor. The EREV-exclusive dual motor models have a single 230 kW (308 hp; 313 PS) rear motor, while triple motor models have a 237.5 kW (318 hp; 323 PS) motor individually powering each rear wheel. EV models are only available with the triple motor powertrain, and have a battery capable of 5C charging for a 10–80% charge time of 12 minutes and provides between 650–670 kilometres (404–416 mi) of range. (Note: 702 kilometers is the range of the pure electric five-seater dual-motor equipped with low-drag wheels and electronic exterior mirrors. The range may change when making optional adjustments. The opening time of the low-drag wheels is to be determined, and the specific time will be subject to the manufacturer's announcement or actual product delivery.)

As part of a powertrain refresh for 2026, the advertised battery capacity for the EREV models decreases to 63.3 kWh. The S800 uses an updated 1.5 liter turbocharged inline-4 petrol engine codenamed M8100PHD as a generator, which has an increased output of 164 horsepower (122 kW; 166 PS). The power outputs of the electric motors remain the same. The Grand Design BEV variant receives a new larger 120 kWh CATL-supplied NMC battery pack, which has a CLTC range rating of 780 kilometres (485 mi) and can recharge from 10–80% in 20 minutes.

Specifications
Model	Battery		Power output			Torque	Gasoline engine	Electric range		10–80% DCFC time	0–100 km/h (62 mph)	Top speed	Kerb weight
Model	Type	Weight	Front	Rear	Total	Total	Power	WLTP	CLTC	10–80% DCFC time	0–100 km/h (62 mph)	Top speed	Kerb weight
EREV
Dual motor	65 kWh (63.262 kWh usable) NMC CATL	385 kg (849 lb)	YS210XYC01 160 kW (215 hp; 218 PS)	TZ210XYA03 230 kW (308 hp; 313 PS)	390 kW (523 hp; 530 PS)	673 N⋅m (496 lb⋅ft)	120 kW (161 hp; 163 PS), Generator: 80 kW (107 hp; 109 PS)	311 km (193 mi)	400 km (249 mi)	10.5 min (6C)	4.9 s	200 km/h (124 mph)	2,770 kg (6,107 lb)
Triple motor 5-seat	65 kWh (63.262 kWh usable) NMC CATL	385 kg (849 lb)	YS210XYC01 160 kW (215 hp; 218 PS)	2×TZ210XYF01 475 kW (637 hp; 646 PS)	635 kW (852 hp; 863 PS)	718 N⋅m (530 lb⋅ft)	120 kW (161 hp; 163 PS), Generator: 80 kW (107 hp; 109 PS)	271 km (168 mi)	365 km (227 mi)	10.5 min (6C)	4.7 s	200 km/h (124 mph)	2,822 kg (6,221 lb)
Triple motor 4-seat	65 kWh (63.262 kWh usable) NMC CATL	385 kg (849 lb)	YS210XYC01 160 kW (215 hp; 218 PS)	2×TZ210XYF01 475 kW (637 hp; 646 PS)	635 kW (852 hp; 863 PS)	718 N⋅m (530 lb⋅ft)	120 kW (161 hp; 163 PS), Generator: 80 kW (107 hp; 109 PS)	258 km (160 mi)	340 km (211 mi)	10.5 min (6C)	4.6 s	200 km/h (124 mph)	2,851 kg (6,285 lb)
Grand Design	65 kWh (63.262 kWh usable) NMC CATL	385 kg (849 lb)	YS210XYC01 160 kW (215 hp; 218 PS)	2×TZ210XYF01 475 kW (637 hp; 646 PS)	635 kW (852 hp; 863 PS)	718 N⋅m (530 lb⋅ft)	122 kW (164 hp; 166 PS),	276 km (171 mi)	365 km (227 mi)	10.5 min (6C)	4.7 s	200 km/h (124 mph)	2,920 kg (6,437 lb)
BEV
Dual motor 5-seat	97 kWh (94.364 kWh usable) NMC CATL	533 kg (1,175 lb)	YS210XYA03 160 kW (215 hp; 218 PS)	TZ210XYA03 230 kW (308 hp; 313 PS)	390 kW (523 hp; 530 PS)	673 N⋅m (496 lb⋅ft)	—	—	670 km (416 mi)	12 min (5C)	4.3 s	210 km/h (130 mph)	2,604 kg (5,741 lb)
Dual motor 4-seat	97 kWh (94.364 kWh usable) NMC CATL	533 kg (1,175 lb)	YS210XYA03 160 kW (215 hp; 218 PS)	TZ210XYA03 230 kW (308 hp; 313 PS)	390 kW (523 hp; 530 PS)	673 N⋅m (496 lb⋅ft)	—	—	650 km (404 mi)	12 min (5C)	4.5 s	210 km/h (130 mph)	2,685 kg (5,919 lb)
Grand Design	120 kWh NMC CATL	628 kg (1,385 lb)	YS210XYA03 160 kW (215 hp; 218 PS)	TZ210XYA03 230 kW (308 hp; 313 PS)	390 kW (523 hp; 530 PS)	673 N⋅m (496 lb⋅ft)	—	—	780 km (485 mi)	20 min (3C)	4.7 s	210 km/h (130 mph)	2,870 kg (6,327 lb)

== Marketing ==
In February 2026, Maextro S800 became the partner of the intelligent mobility era flagship for the CMG Spring Festival Gala 2026.

== Controversy ==
At Maextro's brand technology event on February 20, 2025, a comparison test video was shown, featuring the Maextro S800 and the Mercedes-Maybach S680 in −20 °C (−4 °F) extreme cold conditions. The video demonstrated the Maextro S800's stable performance, while the Maybach S680 experienced loss of control. On February 24 of the same year, a user on Douyin, claiming to be the owner of the very Maybach S680 posted a video accusing Maextro of using his vehicle for "violent driving and testing" without notification or authorization, resulting in damage to the front of the car and deformation of the wheel hubs. The car owner displayed the vehicle's GPS tracking and photos of the damage, questioning Maextro's alleged concealment and demanding compensation for vehicle repair costs.

On the evening of the 25th, JAC Group issued a statement asserting that the test data was authentic and reliable, and that the test vehicle was obtained through formal third-party rental channels, with the vehicle's purpose clearly stated. JAC Group stated it expressed regret for the inconvenience caused to relevant parties and stated their willingness to actively communicate and negotiate a resolution. On the 28th, Maextro's legal department released a statement claiming that a large number of online accounts were maliciously fabricating rumors, and that evidence had been collected and reported. Maextro also issued a reward notice with a maximum of 5 million yuan, soliciting clues related to malicious smear campaigns targeting Maextro.

On March 11, Harmony Intelligent Mobility Alliance's legal department announced via Sina Weibo that it had filed a lawsuit against social media influencer 我是大彬同学, accusing the influencer of exaggerating misinformation and harming the public perception of the Harmony Intelligent Mobility Alliance brand and its products. On March 12, Maextro's legal team stated on Weibo that it had initiated a civil lawsuit against influencer 赛车星冰乐, accusing the latter of repeatedly posting defamatory remarks about the S800 through multiple affiliated accounts and demanded 1 million yuan in compensation. Subsequently, 赛车星冰乐 announced a countersuit against Maextro for falsely claiming he operated affiliated accounts to spread malicious information, harming his reputation and causing emotional distress, and requested 2.5 million yuan in compensation.

== Sales ==
The S800 received 2,108 pre-orders within 48 hours of pre-orders opening on 26 November 2024. After its launch on May 30, 2025, the S800 exceeded 1,000 orders within an hour, of which 70% were for the top configuration and 319 out of 599 pioneer plan slots were taken, 1,600 orders within 24 hours, 2,100 within 48 hours, 2,600 orders within 72 hours, 3,600 after 7 days, and over 5,000 orders after 19 days.

On March 4, 2026, Yu Chengdong (Richard Yu) mentioned at the HIMA Technology Launch Conference that the Maextro S800 has consistently ranked as the top-selling luxury car with a sales volume of over one million units from September 2025 to January 2026. Its delivery volume during the same period was equal to the combined sales volume of the Porsche Panamera and Mercedes-Benz S-Class (including Mercedes-Maybach S-Class) in the Chinese market, with a cumulative delivery volume of 15,000 units.

Year	China		
Year	EV	EREV	Total
2025	1,017	10,907	11,924

== See also ==
- Harmony Intelligent Mobility Alliance
