= M-Hero M817 =

Plug-in hybrid full-size luxury SUV

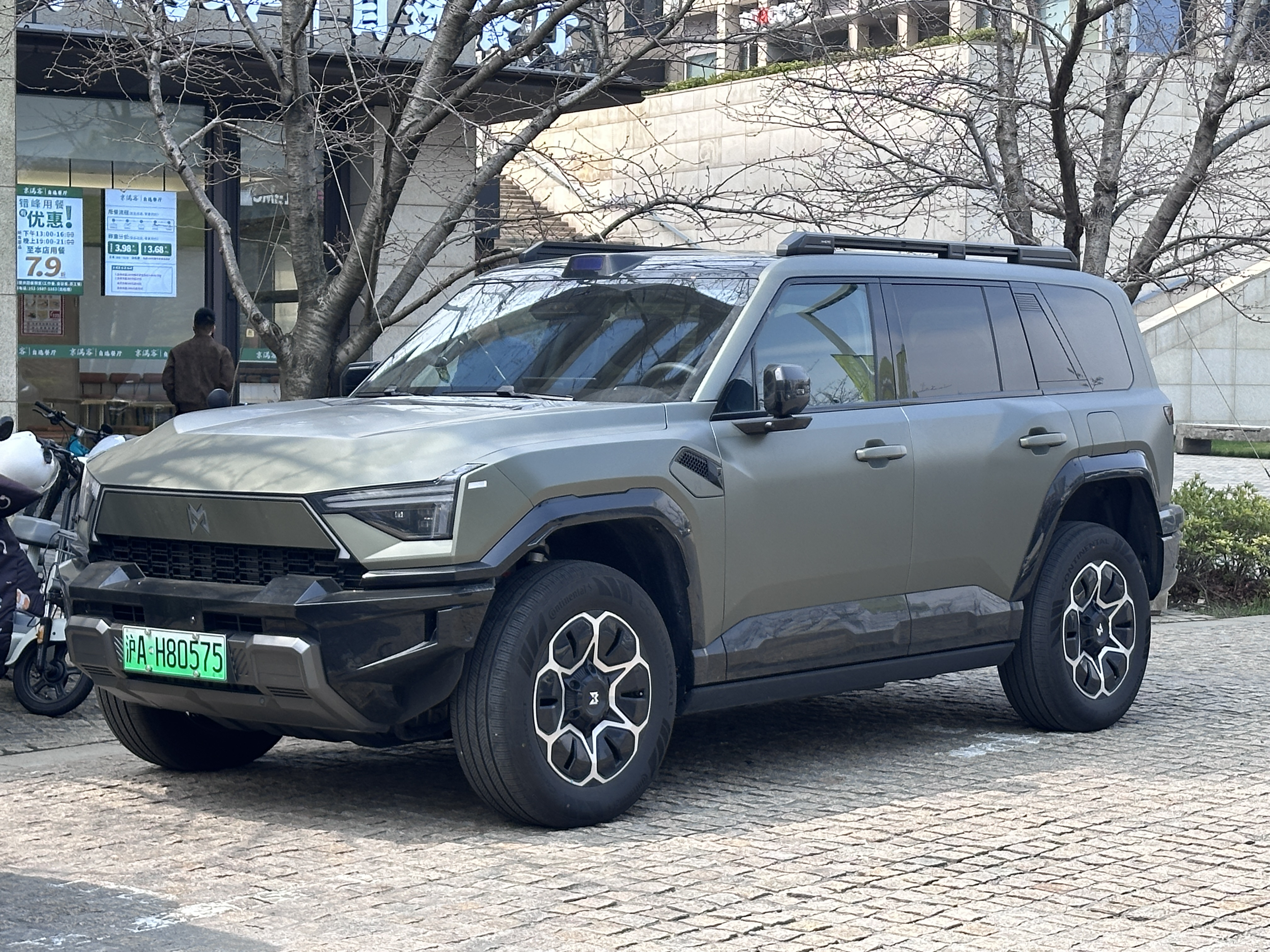
- The M-Hero M817 photographed in Shanghai.

Overview
- Manufacturer: M-Hero
- Also called: MHERO 2 (export)
- Production: 2025–present
- Assembly: China: Wuhan, Hubei

Body and chassis
- Class: Full-size luxury SUV (F)
- Body style: 5-door SUV
- Layout: Front-engine, dual-motor, all-wheel drive
- Platform: Tianyuan Architecture
- Related: M-Hero 917

Powertrain
- Engine: Gasoline plug-in hybrid: 1.5 L DFMC15TE6 turbocharged I4; 2.0 L DFMB20TE1 turbo I4; 2.0 L DFMB20TE3 turbo I4
- Electric motor: PMSM
- Transmission: 2-speed DHT
- Hybrid drivetrain: Series-parallel plug-in hybrid
- Battery: 31.7 kWh LFP CATL; 50.4 kWh Freevoy LFP CATL; 51.9 kWh LFP CATL; 62.5 kWh NMC CATL
- Electric range: 110–207 km (68–129 mi) (WLTP); 140–301 km (87–187 mi) (CLTC)

Dimensions
- Wheelbase: 3,005 mm (118.3 in)
- Length: 5,100 mm (200.8 in)
- Width: 1,998 mm (78.7 in)
- Height: 1,899–1,919 mm (74.8–75.6 in)
- Curb weight: 2,817–3,232 kg (6,210–7,125 lb)

The M-Hero M817 (Chinese: 猛士M817; pinyin: Měngshì M817) is a plug-in hybrid full-size luxury SUV manufactured by the Dongfeng Motor Corporation under the M-Hero brand. It is the second vehicle in the M-Hero lineup and was launched in May 2025.

== Overview ==
The M-Hero M817 is a plug-in hybrid full-size SUV designed for off-roading. The design language is similar to the M-Hero 917. It was first previewed at the 2025 Shanghai Auto Show. The production version was unveiled at Auto Shenzhen on May 31, 2025.

Pre-sales began on July 18, 2025.

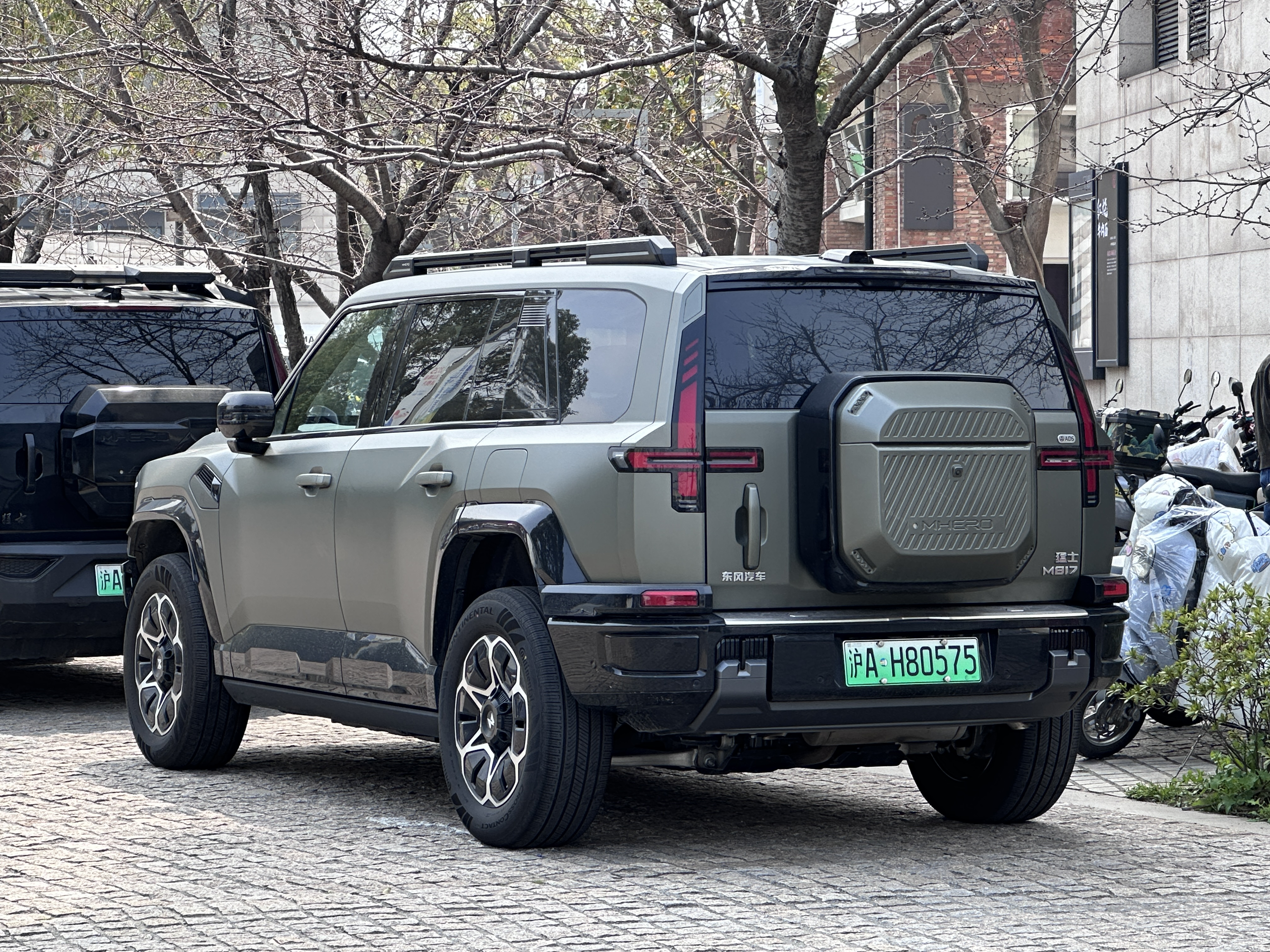
Rear view

=== Design ===
The design language of the M817 is named Heroic Soul Aesthetics 2.0. It features a hood with raised sides and a lower center section, exterior surfaces inspired by battle armor, wide fenders and wheel arches, large bumpers with skid plates underneath, and a closed grille with an illuminated logo.

=== Features ===
The interior uses a 10.23-inch driver's display and a 15.6-inch central touchscreen. There are aluminum toggle switches below the touchscreen to control the drive modes and air conditioning, and on the top to control auxiliary gear.

The interior of the M817 uses Huawei's Harmony Space 5 cockpit operating system that controls the infotainment, instrument clusters, AI assistants, overall connectivity, and rear-seat entertainment. Huawei's ADS 4 system used on other Dongfeng vehicles such as the Voyah Taishan and Voyah Free+ is also present on the M817.

=== 2026 update ===
An update adding three additional trim levels, new colors, and new wheel design was announced in May 2026 with deliveries in July 2026. It features a new 2.0-liter engine option with more powerful motors and an optional larger battery pack with faster charging.

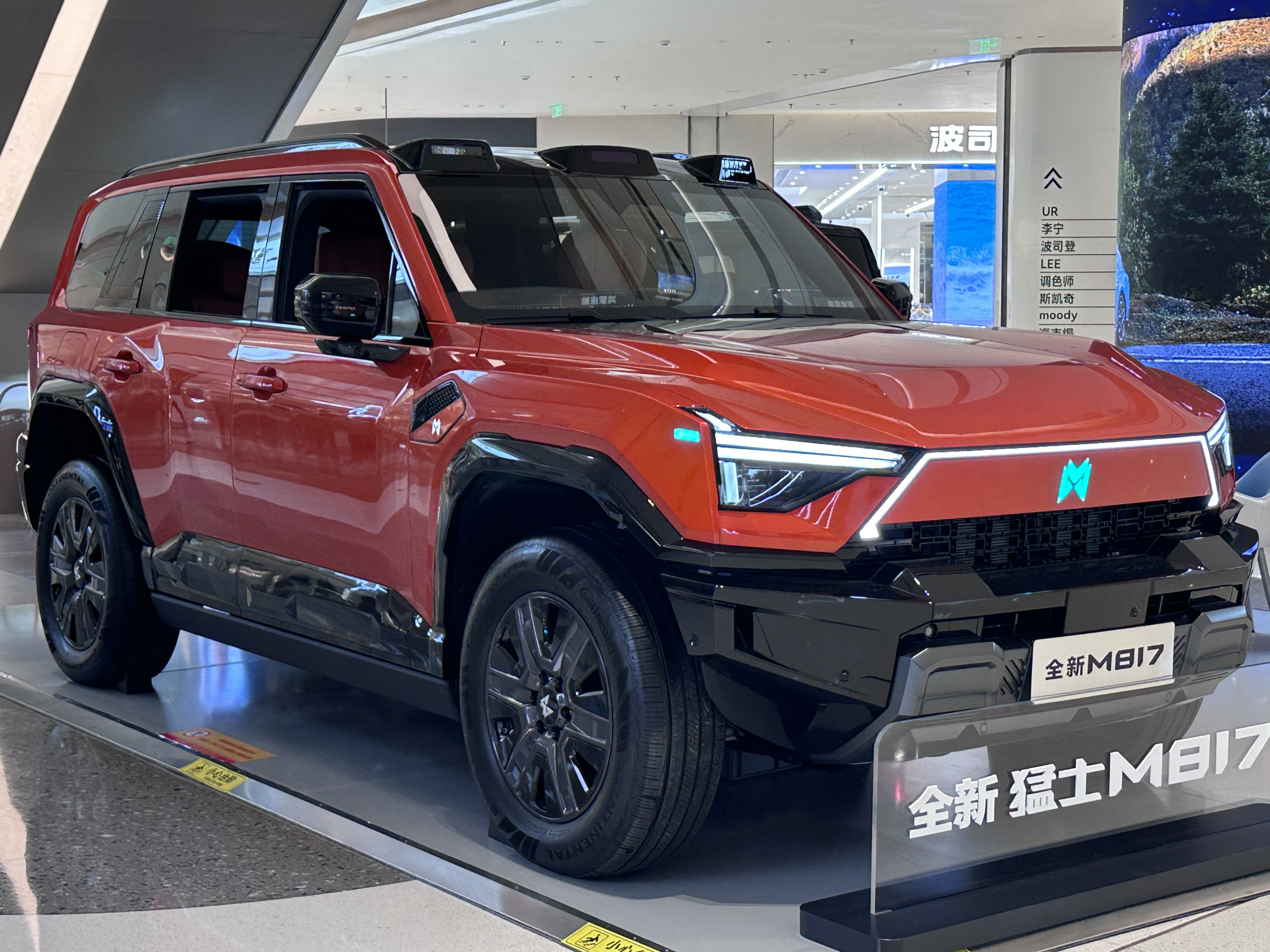
MY2026 M-Hero M817

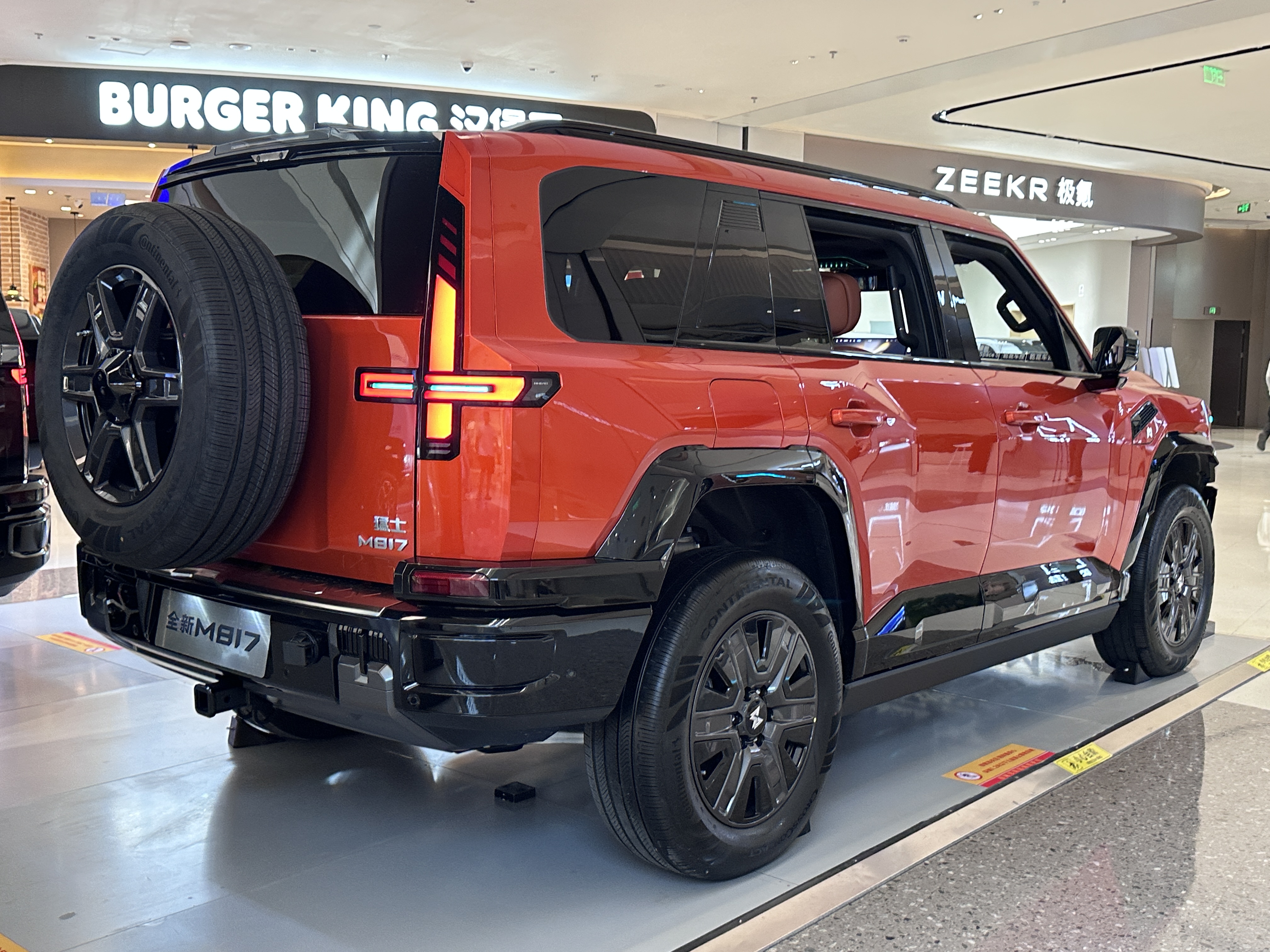
Rear view

=== M-Hero M817 Ultimate ===
The M-Hero M817 Ultimate was launched on 17 November 2026. It has an open hexagonal mesh front grille, open rear spare tire mount, and is exclusively available in a two-tone Starry Night Black-Sayram Lake Blue paint scheme. It has been raised by 2 inches (51 mm) from factory and uses 35-inch BFGoodrich KO3 all-terrain tires on magnesium-aluminium alloy wheels, resulting in a ground clearance of 280 mm (11.0 in), 34° approach and departure angles, 23.9° breakover angle, and a wading depth of 900 mm (35.4 in). It is available with an optional 5 mm (0.20 in) armor package.

The interior features bullet-themed dashboard trim, metallic trim pieces throughout and crystal grab handles. It has been updated with the HarmonySpace 6 infotainment system with 16.1-inch infotainment display, and is equipped with a 20-speaker Dynaudio sound system, satellite phone connectivity, and far-infrared night vision. The ADAS system has been updated to the Qiankun ADS 5 system, featuring an 896-line roof-mounted LiDAR sensor.

It is equipped with front and rear differential locks and a virtual center differential lock, 10 of rear-wheel steering, and is capable of tank turns and a crab walk mode. It uses racing-style adjustable nitrogen shock absorbers with adaptive dampers and is not equipped with air suspension.

It is powered by a new 2.0-liter turbocharged dual-motor series-parallel plug-in hybrid system with 62.5 kWh battery pack with a system total output of 1,014 hp (756 kW; 1,028 PS) and 1,291 N⋅m (952 lb⋅ft) of torque, and is capable of 146 kilometres (91 mi) WLTP electric range and recharging from 30–80% in 9.6 minutes. M-Hero says the M817 Ultimate has 3 kW cooling fans, battery pack with double-sided cooling, and independently oil-cooled motors.

== Powertrain ==
It was initially expected to use a plug-in hybrid powertrain instead of a extended range powertrain used in the 917. Electric motors are present on both axles, giving the M817 all-wheel-drive. The motors work alongside a 1.5 liter turbocharged inline 4. At launch, it was confirmed to be an EREV.

A plug-in hybrid powertrain first became available with the Max+ trim that launched in September 2025. It is labeled as a plug-in hybrid, but is not specified if it is an EREV or not. The Max+ uses a 50.4 kWh CATL Freevoy LFP battery, gets an all-electric range of 215 km (134 mi), and a total range of 1,365 km (848 mi).

The power output ranges between 677 and 912 hp (505 and 680 kW; 686 and 925 PS).

=== 2026 update ===
The 2026 update introduces additional powertrain options with a 2.0-liter turbo plug-in hybrid system a duo motor setup with the combined power output reaching 802 hp (598 kW; 813 PS) and 1,175 N⋅m (867 lb⋅ft) and a more powerful variant reaching 959 hp (715 kW; 972 PS) and 1,241 N⋅m (915 lb⋅ft). 0–100 km/h (62 mph) acceleration reaches 5.2 seconds and 4.26 seconds respectively. batteries are 51.9 kWh CATL LFP and 62.5 kWh CATL NMC batteries with CLTC pure electric ranges of 215 and 301 km (134 and 187 mi) respectively, while CLTC combined ranges reaches 1,365 and 1,450 km (848 and 901 mi) respectively. WLTC fuel consumption is 8.36 and 7.99 L/100 km (28.1 and 29.4 mpg_{‑US}) and the 30–80% SoC charging time is 16.2 minutes and 9.6 minutes with 800V architecture and 6C supercharging.

Specifications
Model year	Battery		Engine			Motor		System total		Electric range		30–80% charge	0–100 km/h (62 mph)
Model year	Type	Weight	Type	Net power	Torque	Front	Rear	Power	Torque	WLTP	CLTC	30–80% charge	0–100 km/h (62 mph)
2025–26	31.7 kWh LFP	258 kg (569 lb)	1.5 L DFMC15TE6 I4 turbo	184 hp (137 kW; 187 PS)	290 N⋅m (214 lb⋅ft)	268 hp (200 kW; 272 PS), 350 N⋅m (258 lb⋅ft)	275 hp (205 kW; 279 PS), 410 N⋅m (302 lb⋅ft)	677 hp (505 kW; 686 PS)	848 N⋅m (625 lb⋅ft)	110 km (68 mi)	140 km (87 mi)	15 min	5.2 s
2025	50.4 kWh LFP	366 kg (807 lb)	1.5 L DFMC15TE6 I4 turbo	184 hp (137 kW; 187 PS)	290 N⋅m (214 lb⋅ft)	268 hp (200 kW; 272 PS), 350 N⋅m (258 lb⋅ft)	275 hp (205 kW; 279 PS), 410 N⋅m (302 lb⋅ft)	677 hp (505 kW; 686 PS)	848 N⋅m (625 lb⋅ft)	170 km (106 mi)	215 km (134 mi)	16 min	5.6 s
2026	51.9 kWh LFP	366 kg (807 lb)	2.0 L DFMB20TE1 I4 turbo	214 hp (160 kW; 217 PS)	365 N⋅m (269 lb⋅ft)	268 hp (200 kW; 272 PS), 350 N⋅m (258 lb⋅ft)	313 hp (233 kW; 317 PS), 460 N⋅m (339 lb⋅ft)	802 hp (598 kW; 813 PS)	1,175 N⋅m (867 lb⋅ft)	170 km (106 mi)	215 km (134 mi)	16 min	5.2 s
2026 Ultra	62.5 kWh NMC	365 kg (805 lb)	2.0 L DFMB20TE1 I4 turbo	214 hp (160 kW; 217 PS)	365 N⋅m (269 lb⋅ft)	322 hp (240 kW; 326 PS), 400 N⋅m (295 lb⋅ft)	416 hp (310 kW; 422 PS), 476 N⋅m (351 lb⋅ft)	959 hp (715 kW; 972 PS)	1,241 N⋅m (915 lb⋅ft)	207 km (129 mi)	301 km (187 mi)	9.6 min	4.2 s
2027 Ultimate	62.5 kWh NMC	365 kg (805 lb)	2.0 L DFMB20TE3 I4 turbo	255 hp (190 kW; 259 PS) @5,000	415 N⋅m (306 lb⋅ft) @4,000	322 hp (240 kW; 326 PS), 400 N⋅m (295 lb⋅ft)	416 hp (310 kW; 422 PS), 476 N⋅m (351 lb⋅ft)	1,014 hp (756 kW; 1,028 PS)	1,291 N⋅m (952 lb⋅ft)	146 km (91 mi)	220 km (137 mi)	9.6 min	4.8 s

== Sales ==
Year	China
2025	5,876
