= Leapmotor C01 =

Mid-size sedan

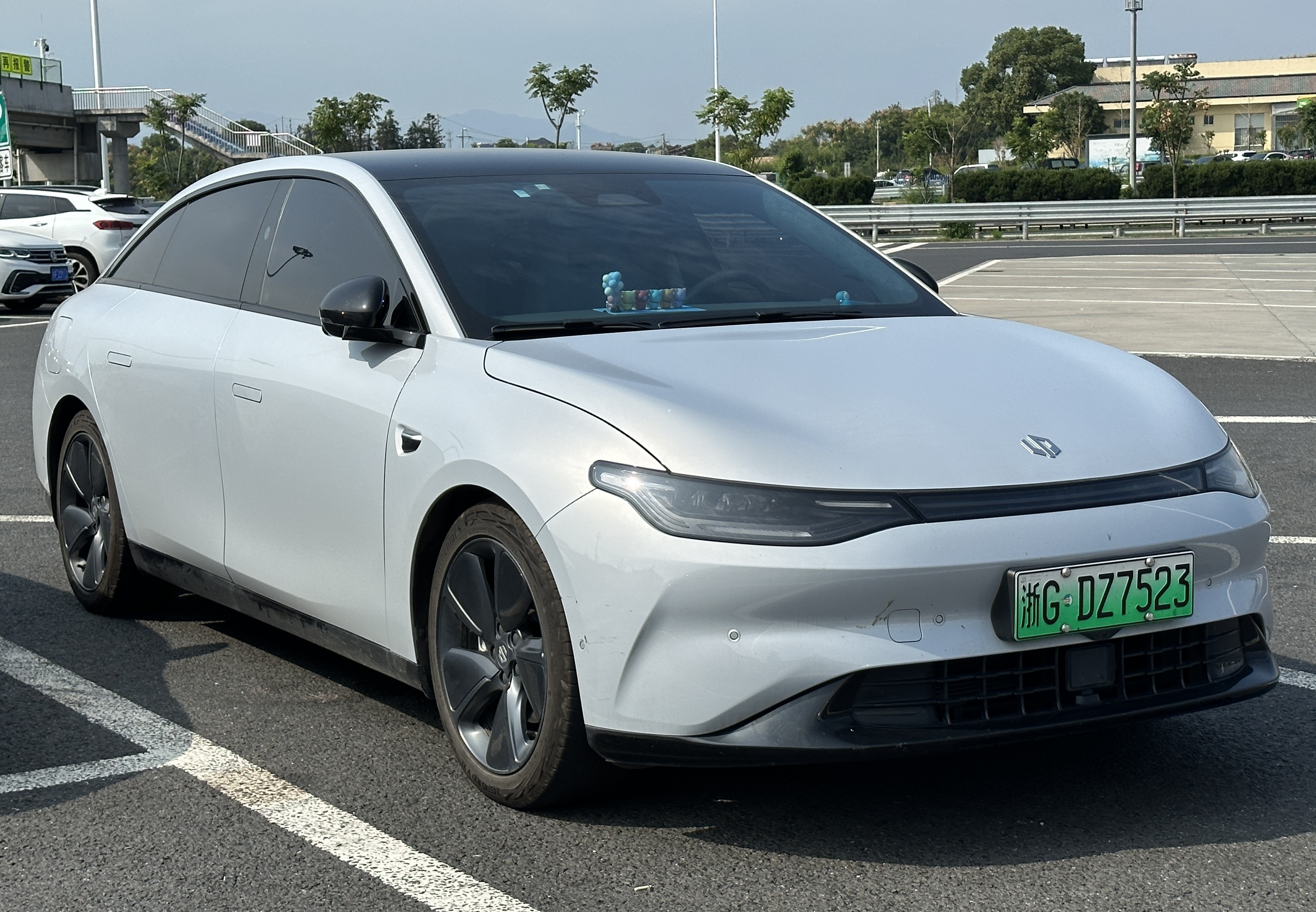

Overview
- Manufacturer: Leapmotor
- Production: 2022–present
- Model years: 2023–present
- Assembly: China: Jinhua, Zhejiang

Body and chassis
- Class: Mid-size car (D)
- Body style: 4-door sedan
- Layout: EV: Rear-motor rear-wheel-drive; Dual-motors all-wheel-drive; EREV: Front-engine + Rear-motor, rear-wheel-drive
- Related: Leapmotor C11

Powertrain
- Engine: Petrol: 1.5 L H15R I4; 1.5 L SFG15TR turbo I4
- Electric motor: 200 kW (RWD), 2×200kW (AWD)
- Transmission: Single-speed gear reduction
- Hybrid drivetrain: Plug-in series hybrid (C01 EREV)
- Battery: REEV; 30.1 kWh LFP CALB/Gotion; 43.7 kWh NMC CALB; EV; 62.8 kWh LFP CALB/Zenergy; 78.5 kWh LFP Sunwoda/Zenergy; 82.5 kWh NMC
- Range: 1,000–1,077 km (621–669 mi) (EREV, WLTP); 1,176–1,276 km (731–793 mi) (EREV, CLTC)
- Electric range: 148–248 km (92–154 mi) (EREV, WLTP); 216–316 km (134–196 mi) (EREV, CLTC); 525–717 km (326–446 mi) (EV, CLTC)

Dimensions
- Wheelbase: 2,930 mm (115.4 in)
- Length: 5,050 mm (198.8 in)
- Width: 1,902 mm (74.9 in)
- Height: 1,509 mm (59.4 in)
- Curb weight: 1,995–2,145 kg (4,398–4,729 lb)

The Leapmotor C01 (Chinese: 零跑C01; pinyin: Língpǎo C01) is a mid-size sedan produced by Chinese automobile manufacturer Leapmotor. It is the second product of the updated design language of the Leapmotor brand.

== Overview ==
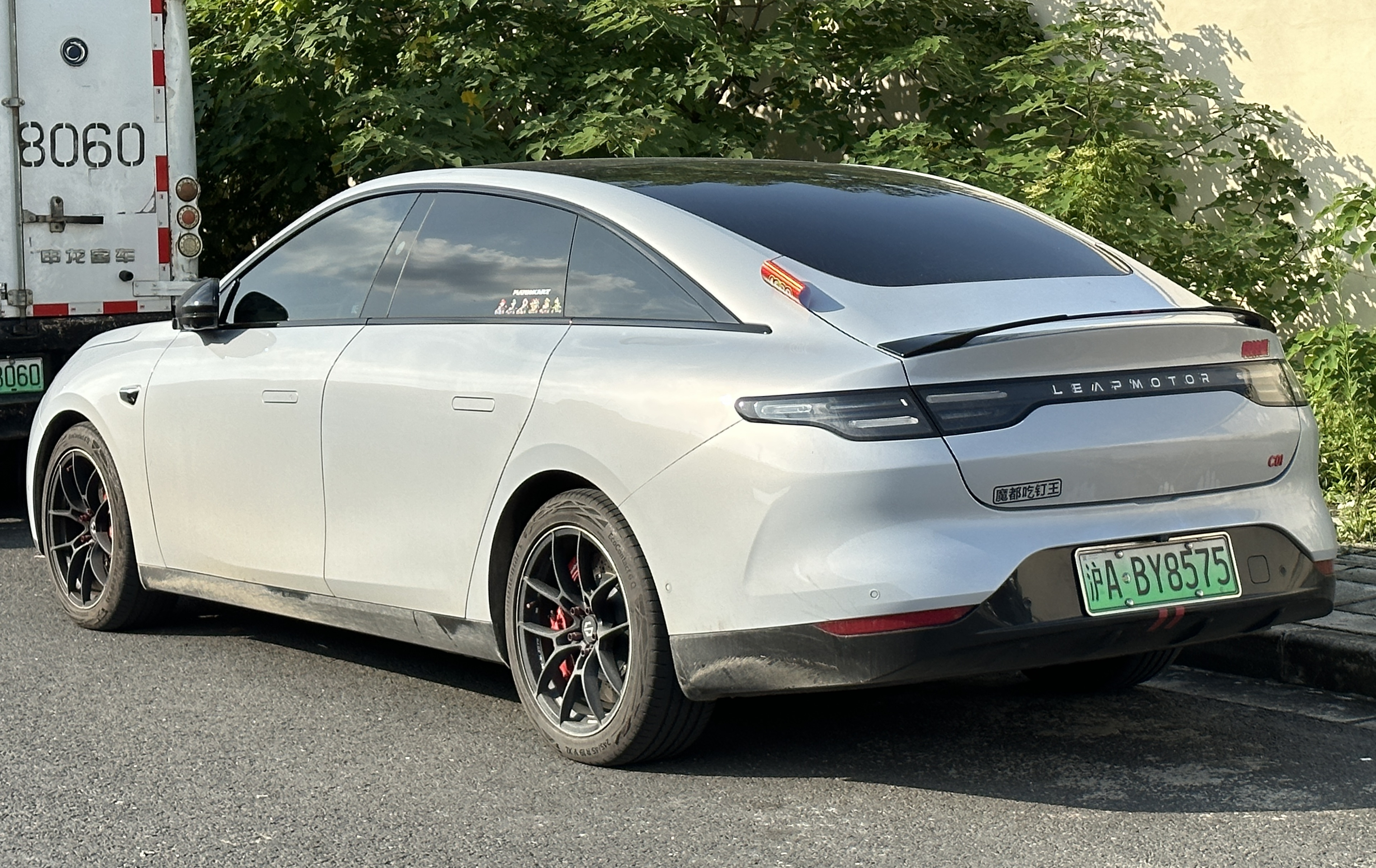
Rear view

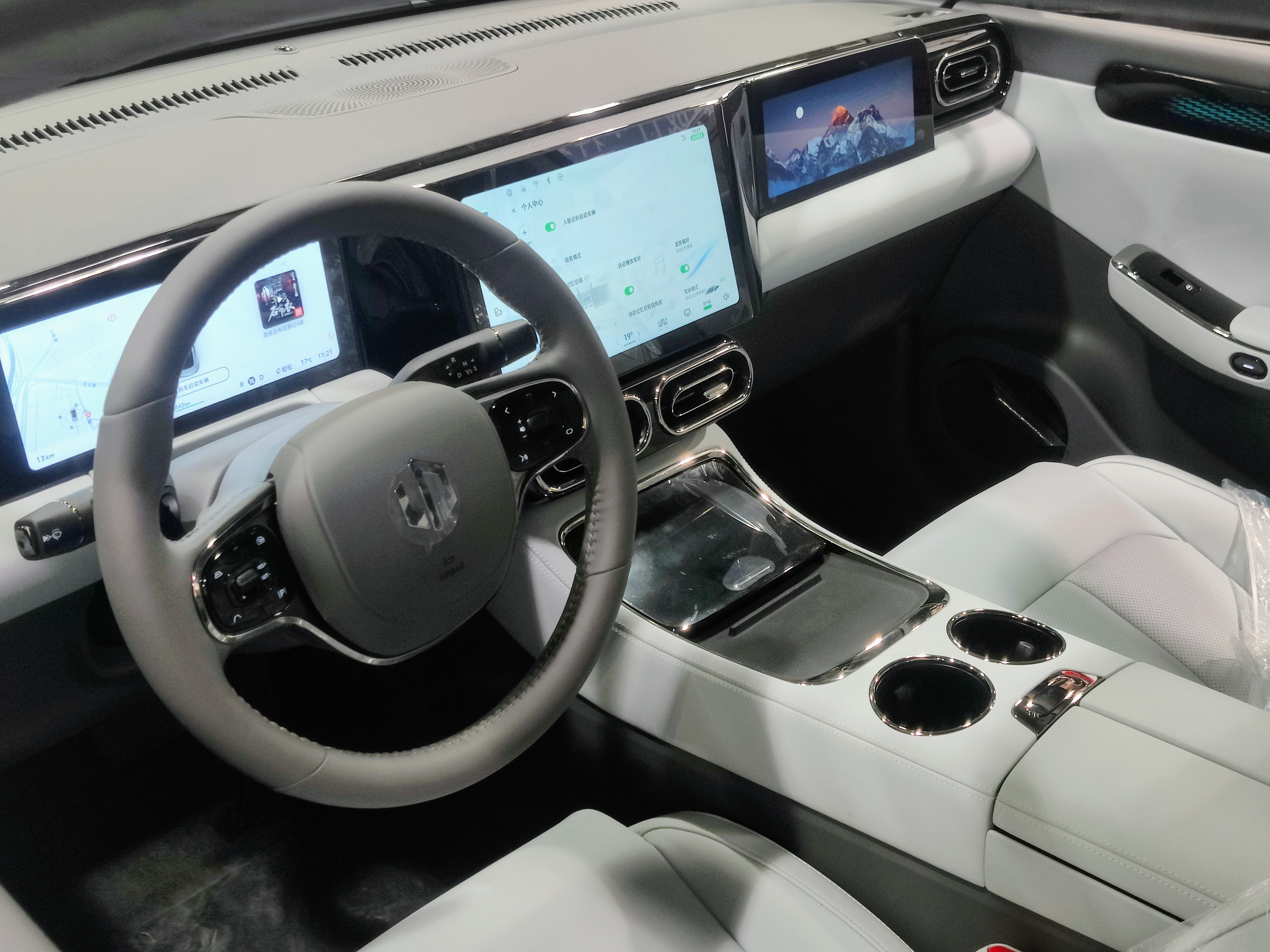
Interior

The Leapmotor C01 is built on the same platform as the Leapmotor C11 crossover SUV and has a drag coefficient of 0.226 Cd.

The interior of the C01 shares the T-type triple-screen design with the Leapmotor C11. The center infotainment screen is equipped with a built-in Qualcomm SA 8155P chip and measures 12.8 inches, while the instrument cluster display and additional screens measure 10.25 inches.

== Powertrain ==
=== Battery electric ===
The entry level fully-electric C01 has a single motor capable of 200 kW (268 hp; 272 PS) and a peak torque of 360 N⋅m (266 lb⋅ft), while the dual-motor version has a maximum power output of 400 kW (536 hp; 544 PS) and peak torque of 720 N⋅m (531 lb⋅ft). All C01 models are equipped with a battery pack with cell-to-chassis technology, which consists of a battery tray that is a structural member of the chassis to be integrated into production vehicle bodies.

The ultra-long range version of the C01 has a 90 kWh battery pack supporting a CLTC range of 717 kilometres (446 mi), while the base version comes with a 500-kilometre (310 mi) range. The dual-motor version can accelerate from 0 to 100 km/h (62 mph) in 3.7 seconds.

=== Range extender ===
In July 2023, the EREV variant of C01 was unveiled. The EREV C01 has a 1.5-liter petrol engine produced by Seres Group and has a maximum power output of 68 kW (91 hp; 92 PS). The drive motor of the vehicle shares the same specifications as the single motor EV version, which has a maximum power output of 200 kW (270 hp; 270 PS).

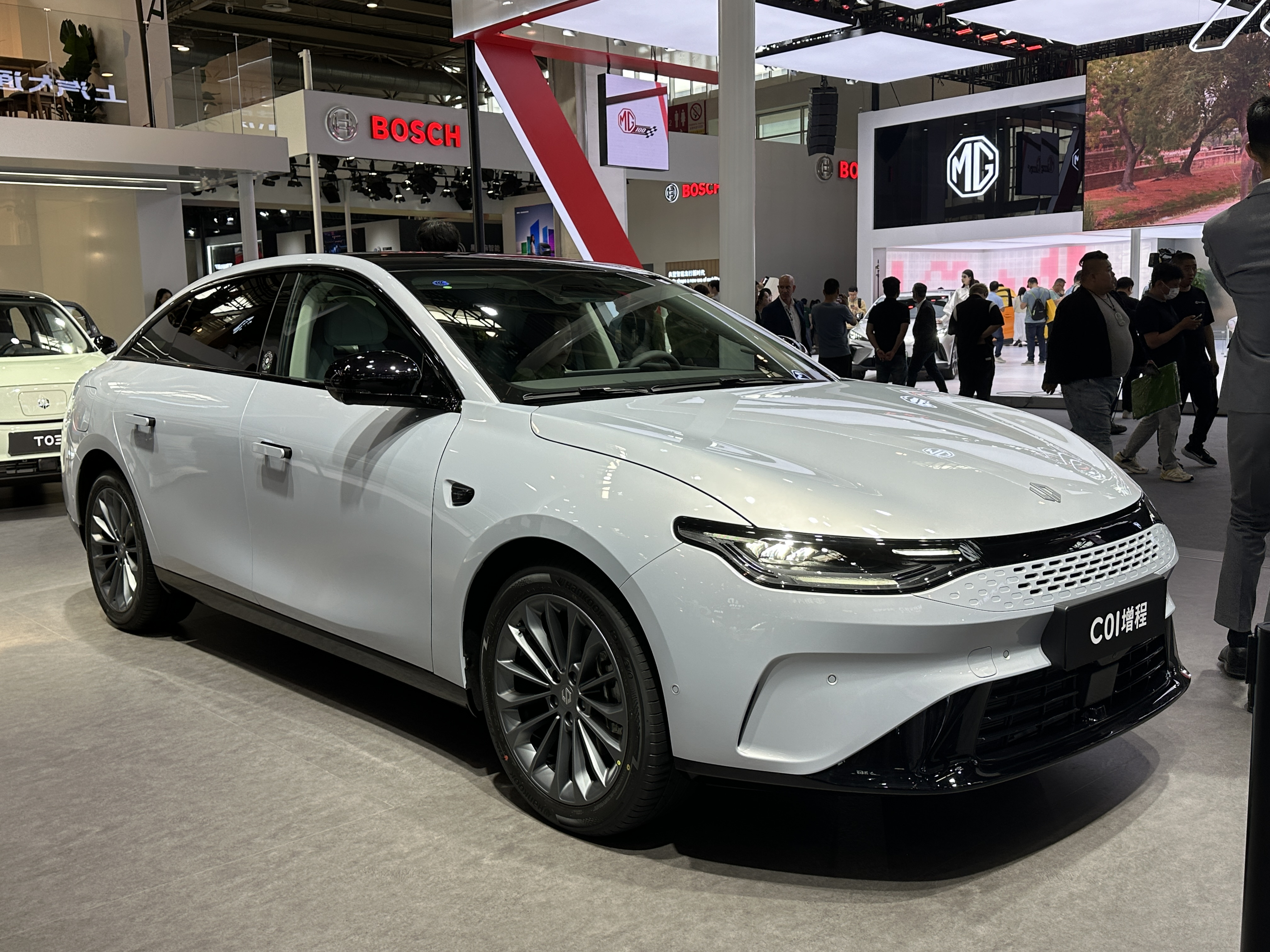
Leapmotor C01 EREV

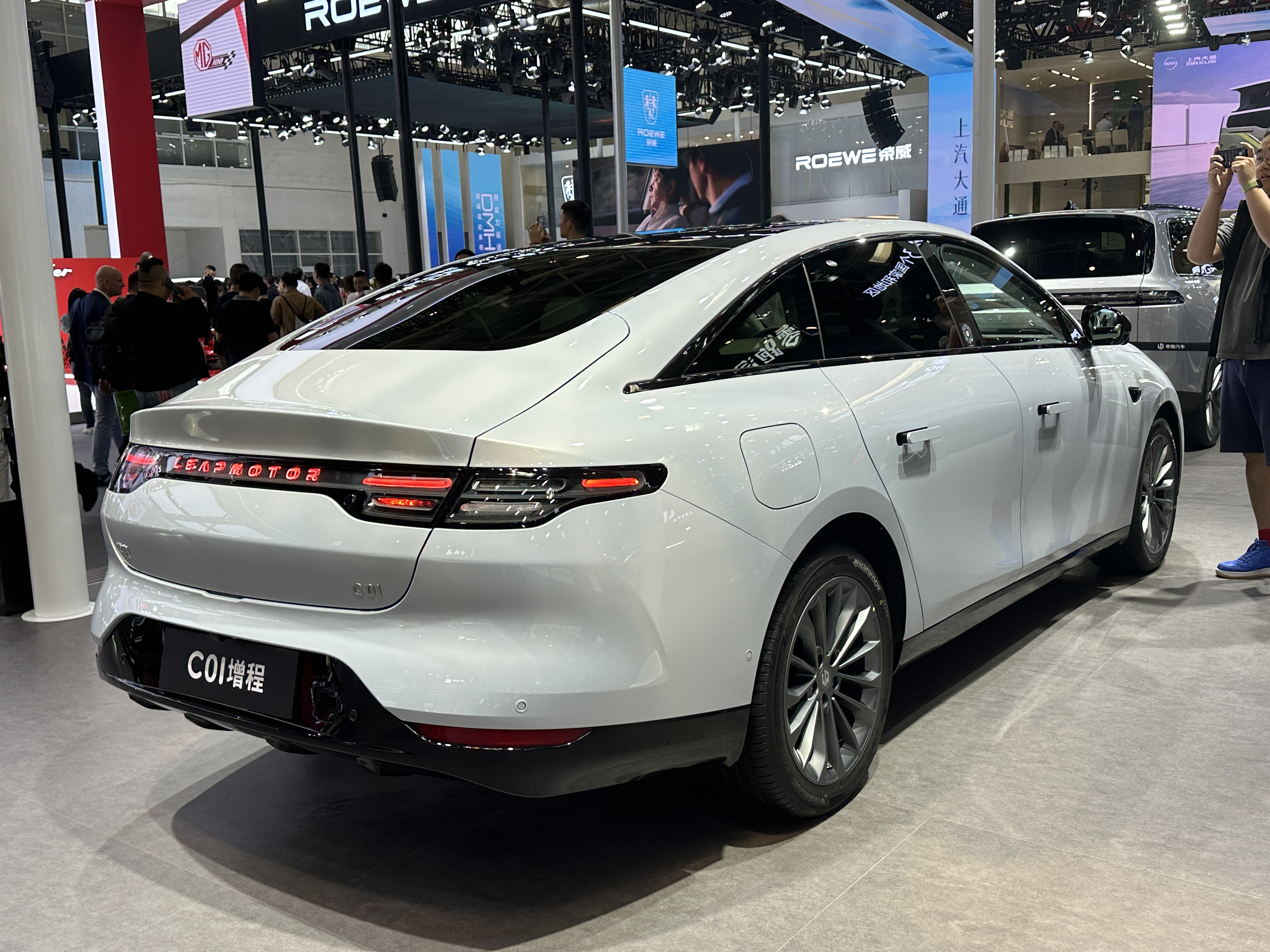
Rear view

Specifications
Year	Engine		Battery		Power	Torque	Range	
Year	Type	Displacement	Type	Weight	Power	Torque	WLTP	CLTC
EREV
2023–25	Petrol (Generator)	1.5L Seres SFG15TR I4	30.1 kWh LFP	262 kg (578 lb)	268 hp (200 kW; 272 PS)	360 N⋅m (266 lb⋅ft)	148 km (92 mi)	216 km (134 mi)
2023–	Petrol (Generator)	1.5L Seres SFG15TR I4	43.74 kWh NMC	273 kg (602 lb)	268 hp (200 kW; 272 PS)	360 N⋅m (266 lb⋅ft)	248 km (154 mi)	316 km (196 mi)
EV
2022–25	N/A	–	62.8 kWh LFP	510 kg (1,124 lb)	268 hp (200 kW; 272 PS)	360 N⋅m (266 lb⋅ft)	—	525 km (326 mi)
2022–23	N/A	–	78.5408 kWh LFP	628 kg (1,385 lb)	268 hp (200 kW; 272 PS)	360 N⋅m (266 lb⋅ft)	—	606 km (377 mi)
2024–25	N/A	–	78.5408 kWh LFP	628 kg (1,385 lb)	268 hp (200 kW; 272 PS)	360 N⋅m (266 lb⋅ft)	—	625 km (388 mi)
2022–24	N/A	–	89.72856 kWh NMC	544 kg (1,199 lb)	268 hp (200 kW; 272 PS)	360 N⋅m (266 lb⋅ft)	—	717 km (446 mi)
2022–24	N/A	–	89.72856 kWh NMC	544 kg (1,199 lb)	536 hp (400 kW; 543 PS)	720 N⋅m (531 lb⋅ft)	—	630 km (391 mi)

== Sales ==
Year	China		
Year	EV	EREV	Total
2022	4,815	—	4,815
2023	20,840	4,245	25,085
2024	15,493	6,106	21,559
2025	5,940	2,210	8,150
