= Dongfeng Succe =

Chinese compact MPV

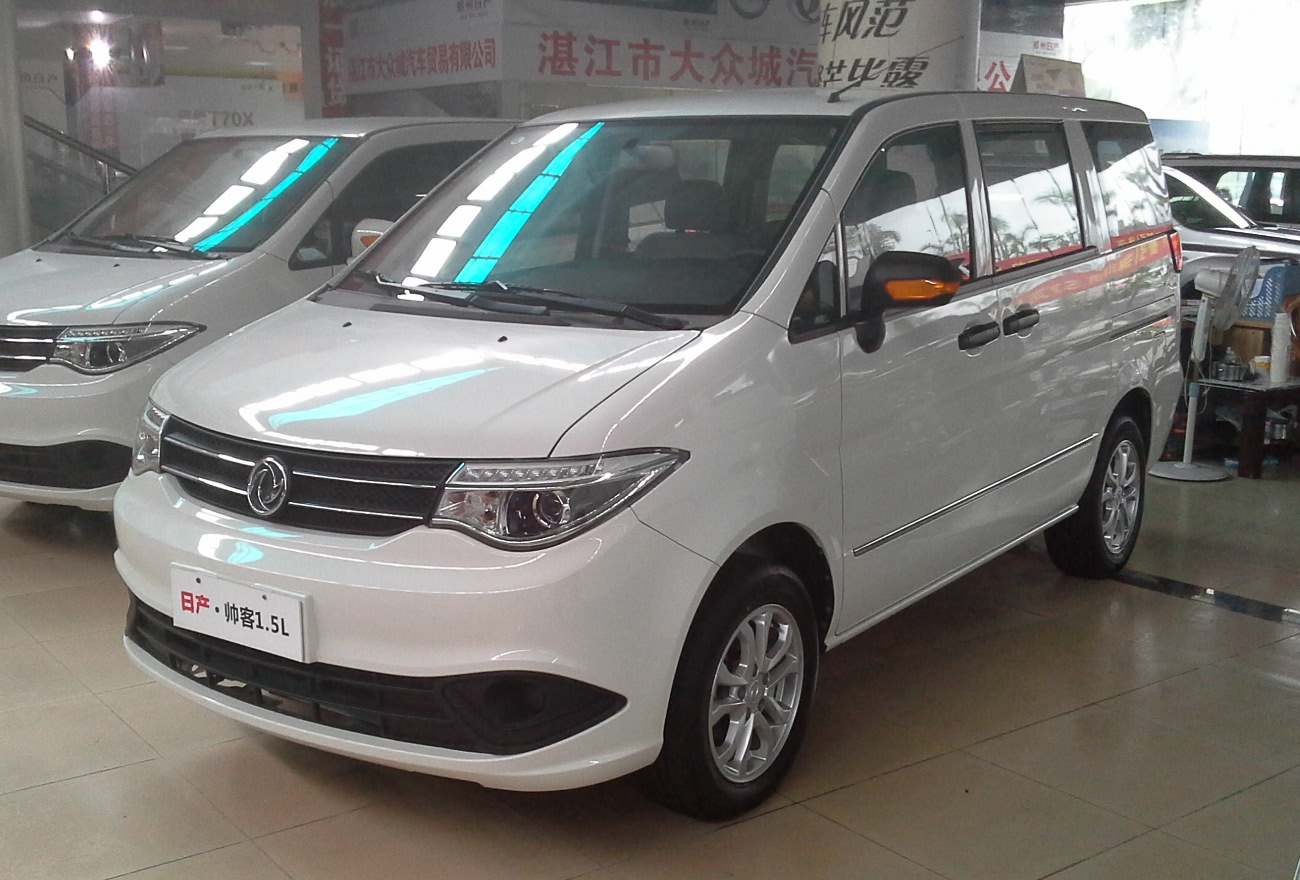

Overview
- Manufacturer: Dongfeng Motor
- Also called: Dongfeng Yumsun; ZNA Succe; Nissan Serena (C24)
- Production: 2007–2020
- Assembly: China: Zhengzhou, Henan (Zhengzhou Nissan)

Body and chassis
- Body style: 5-door minivan
- Layout: Front-engine, front-wheel-drive
- Related: Nissan Serena (C24)

Powertrain
- Engine: 1.5 L ZG15 I4; 1.6 L HR16 I4
- Electric motor: 82 horsepower (61 kilowatts) Meiden Y61 synchronous permanent magnet brushless motor
- Transmission: 5-speed manual

Dimensions
- Wheelbase: 2,695 mm (106.1 in)
- Length: 4,500 mm (177.2 in)
- Width: 1,825 mm (71.9 in)
- Height: 1,695 mm (66.7 in)

The Dongfeng Succe (帅客) or Dongfeng Yumsun is a compact MPV produced by Zhengzhou Nissan Automobile, a subsidiary of Dongfeng Motor Co., Ltd.

== Overview ==
The Dongfeng Succe was originally built on the same platforms as the Nissan Serena (C24) with a complete makeover on the exterior styling to be sold with a lower price tag. As of 2018, prices of the post-facelift Dongfeng Succe ranges from 68,800 to 91,800 yuan.

Starting from 2013, Dongfeng Succe was sold in Indonesia by Xarrina Motor Indonesia as ZNA Succe.

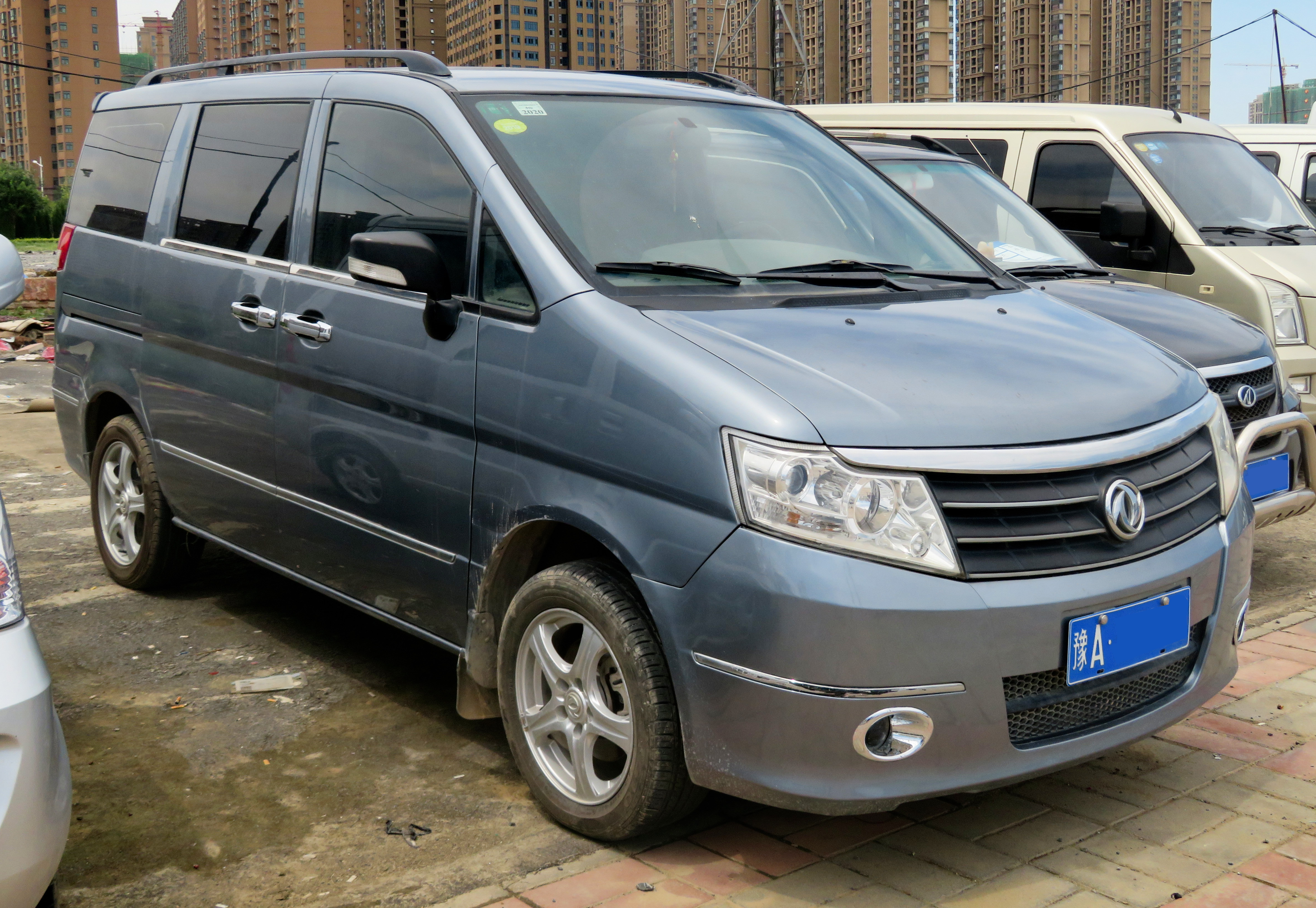
Dongfeng Succe pre-facelift

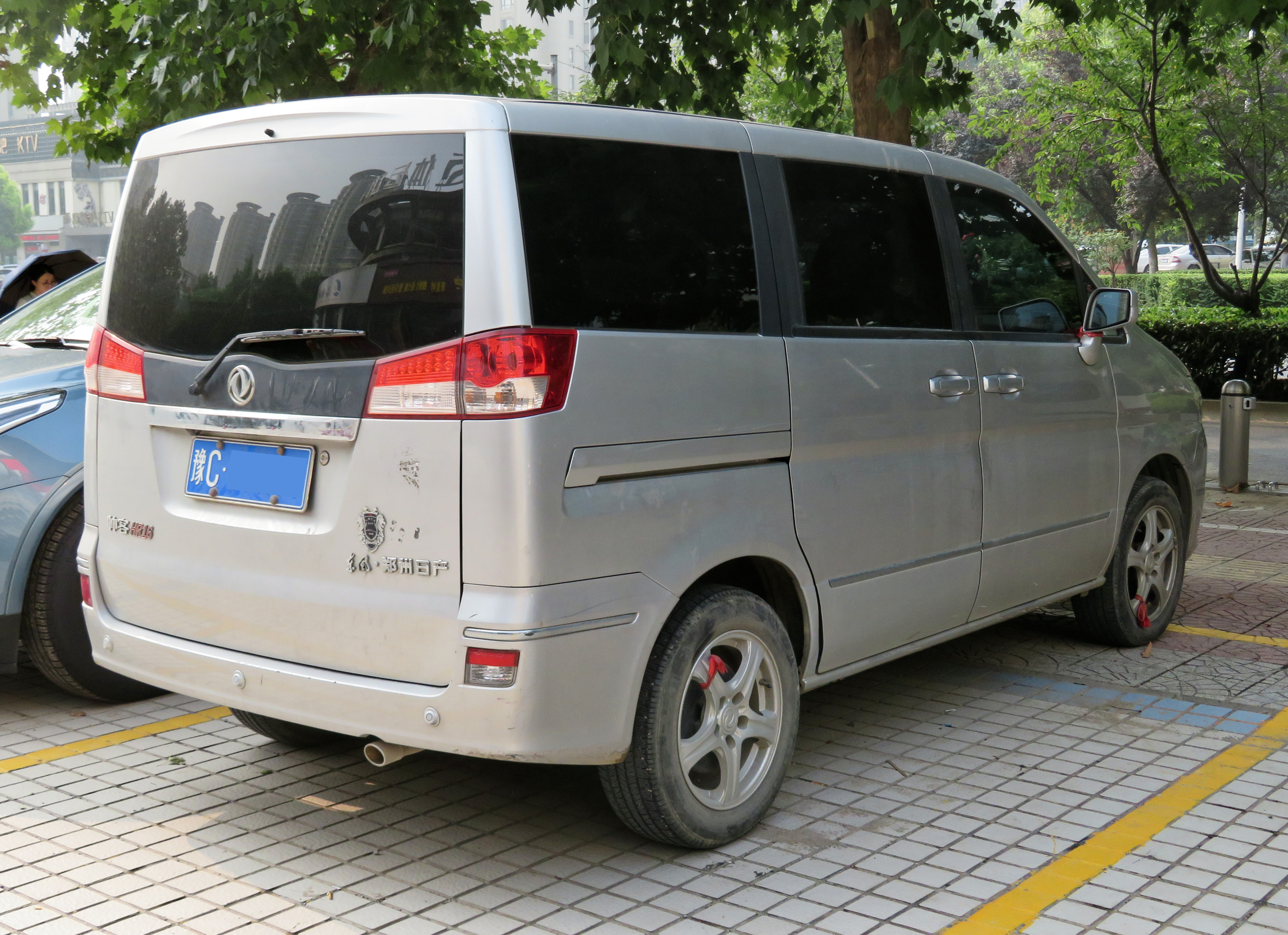
Dongfeng Succe pre-facelift

=== 2018 facelift ===
The Succe received a facelift in 2018 featuring a restyled front fascia and a restyled rear end.

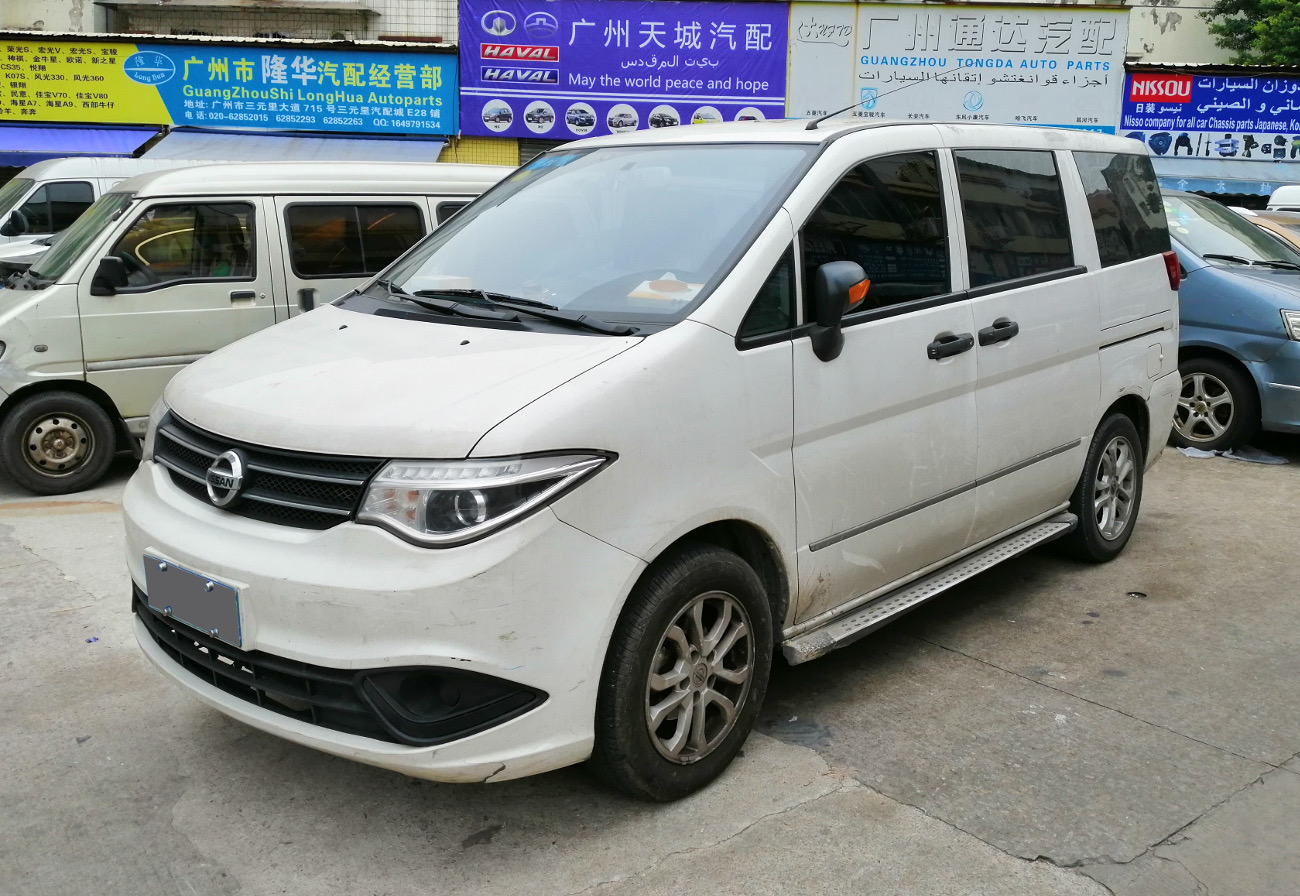
Dongfeng Succe facelift

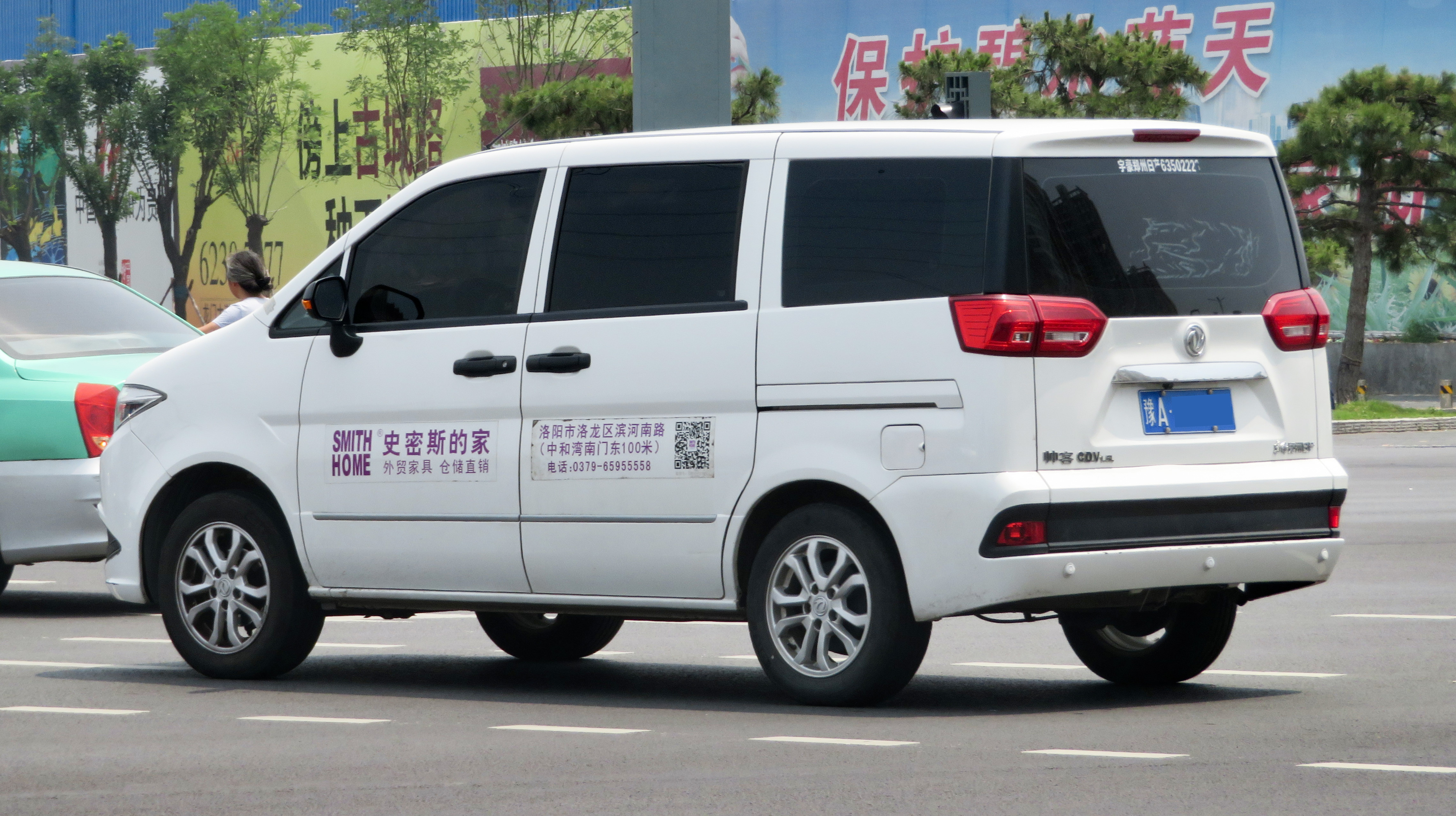
Dongfeng Succe facelift rear

=== Dongfeng Succe EV ===
The 2018 model year also introduce the electric version of the Dongfeng Succe. The Dongfeng Succe EV was introduced during the 2018 Beijing Auto Show, and is powered by an 82 hp（60 kW）electric motor, and is available as a passenger van or a panel van for the logistics industry. Both models feature a 49.572 kW·h battery and a 301 km range for the passenger van and 298 km range for the panel van version.

An update was introduced for the 2019 model year. The update changed the interior seating configuration from 2+3+2 to 2+2+3, and the battery was upgraded to 54.35kWh which is capable of a 320 km NEDC range.

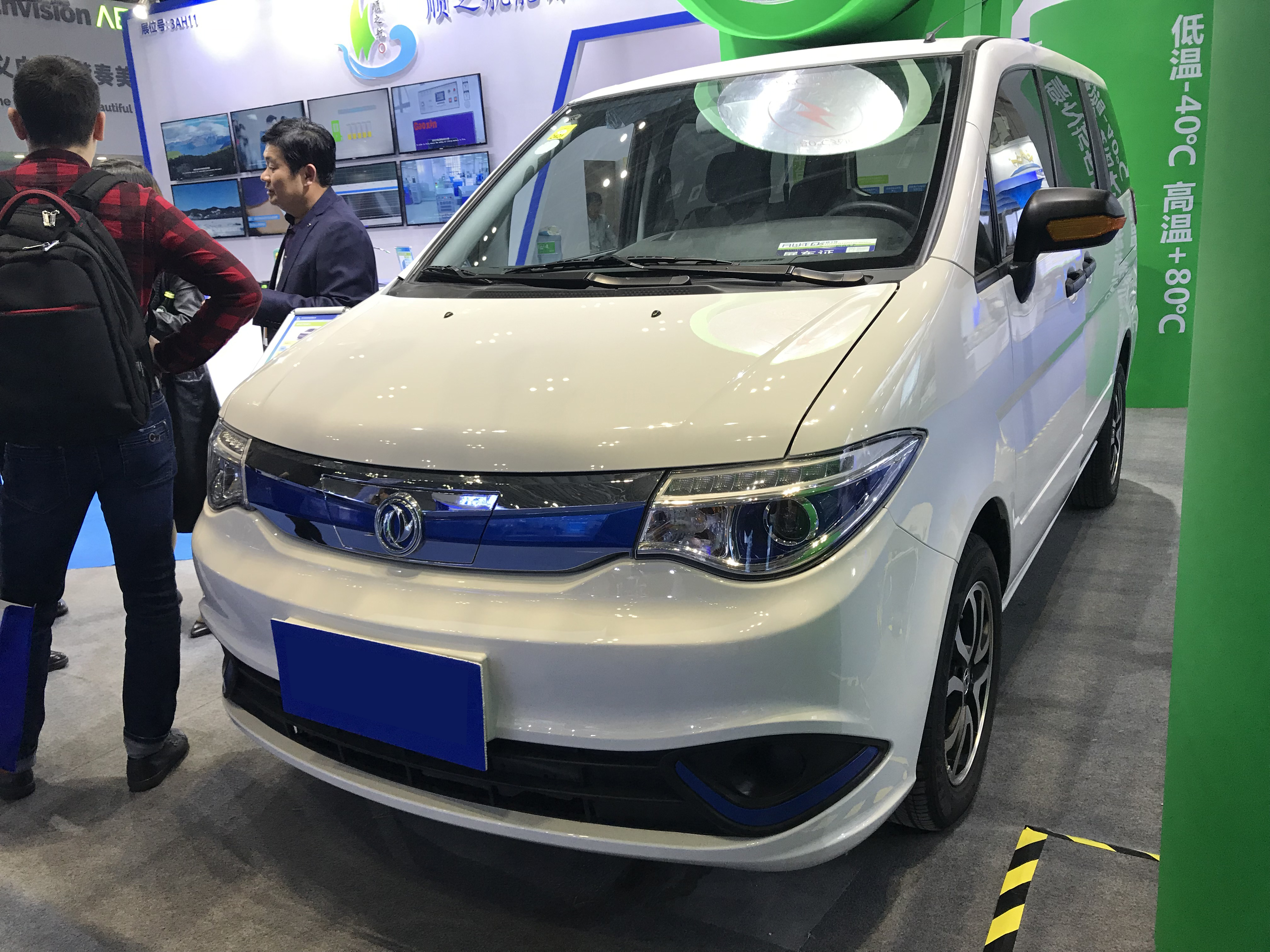
Dongfeng Succe EV

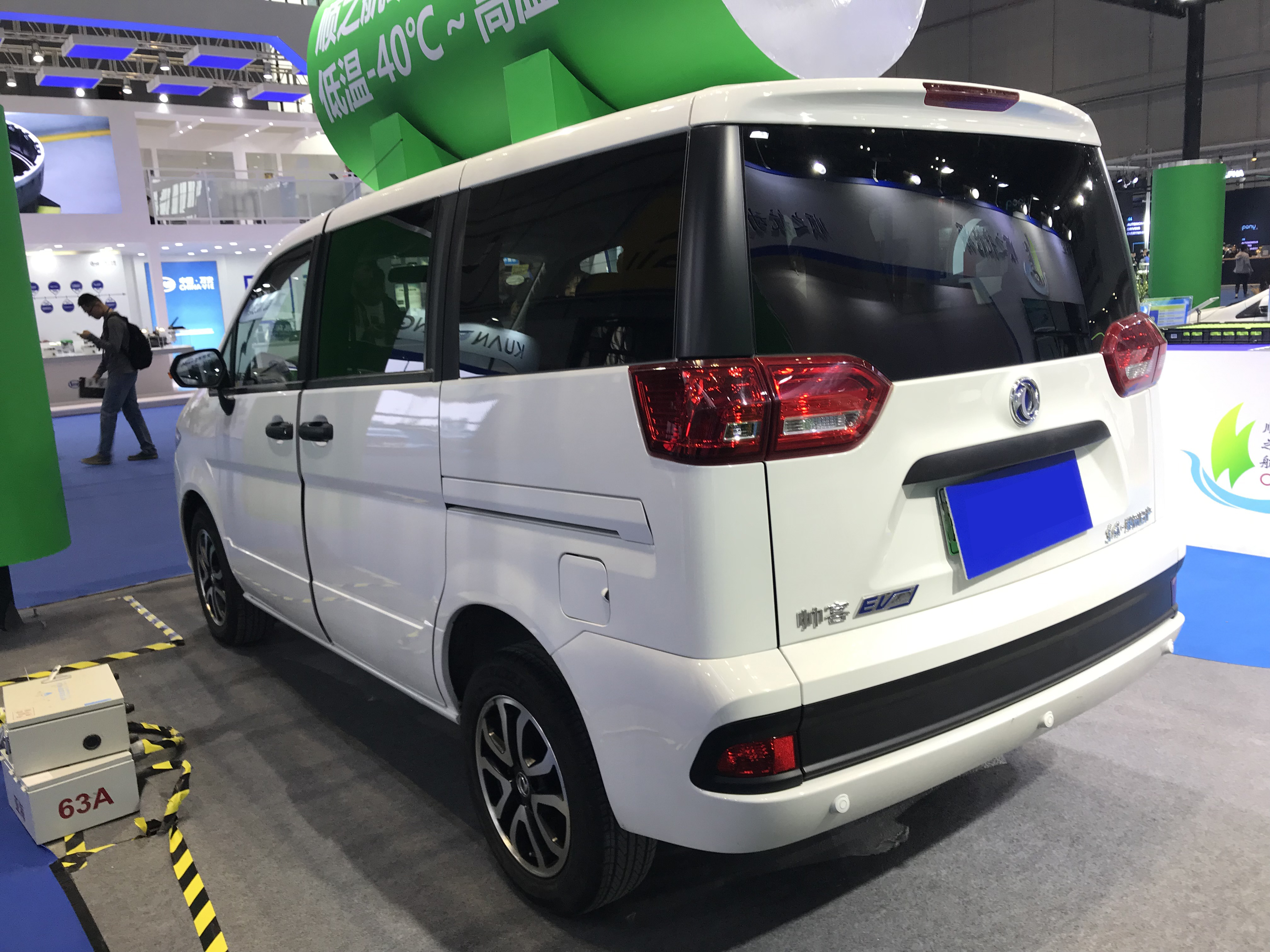
Dongfeng Succe EV rear
