= Fangchengbao Formula S =

Battery electric full-size liftback sedan and station wagon

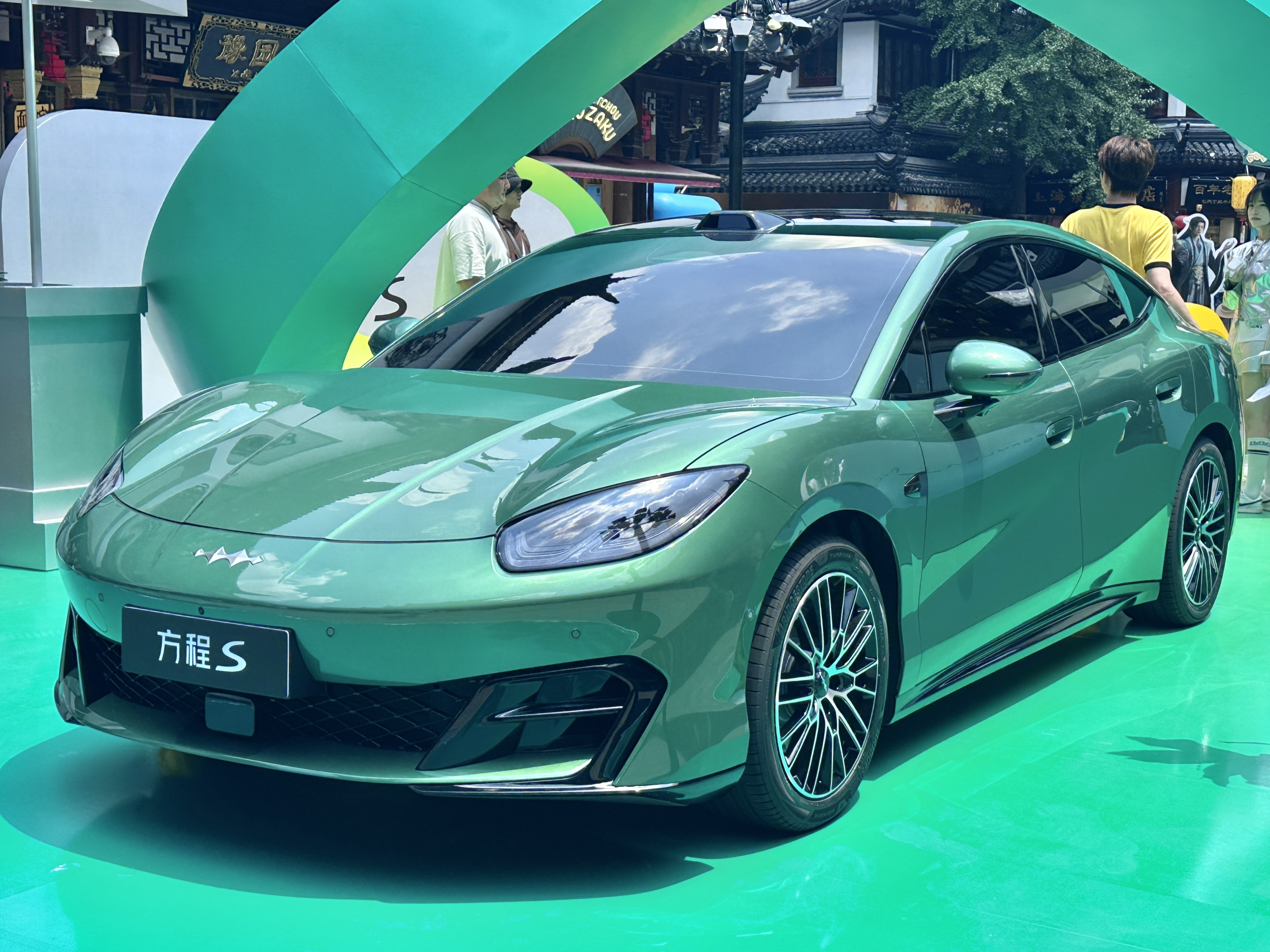

Overview
- Manufacturer: BYD Auto
- Production: 2026–present
- Assembly: China: Shenzhen, Guangdong
- Designer: Under the lead of Wolfgang Egger

Body and chassis
- Class: Full-size car (E)
- Body style: 5-door liftback sedan; 5-door station wagon (GT)
- Layout: Rear-motor, rear-wheel-drive; Dual-motors, all-wheel-drive
- Related: Denza Z9S

Powertrain
- Electric motor: AC permanent magnet synchronous
- Power output: 245–490 kW (333–666 PS; 329–657 hp)
- Battery: 76.744 kWh BYD Blade 2.0 LFP; 92.903 kWh Blade 2.0 LFP
- Electric range: 730–900 km (454–559 mi) (CLTC); 730–850 km (454–528 mi) (GT, CLTC)

Dimensions
- Wheelbase: 2,960 mm (116.5 in)
- Length: 5,060 mm (199.2 in); 5,025 mm (197.8 in) (GT)
- Width: 1,967 mm (77.4 in)
- Height: 1,483 mm (58.4 in)
- Curb weight: 1,999–2,250 kg (4,407–4,960 lb)

The Fangchengbao Formula S (Chinese: 方程豹 方程S) is a battery electric full-size liftback sedan and station wagon manufactured by BYD Auto under the Fangchengbao brand. Following of the four SUV models, it is the first sedan for the brand.

== Overview ==
The Formula S and Formula S GT were first shown at the 2026 Beijing Auto Show. Technical specifications were revealed through China's MIIT regulatory filings on 11 June 2026.

The Formula S carries the design language set by earlier concept cars and the Denza Z, which was initially developed as a Fangchengbao model. Design elements include narrow polygonal headlights, a wide lower intake and smoked quad taillights. The GT variant is a station wagon with the same wheelbase but 35 mm (1.4 in) shorter overall length.

The Formula S has a drag coefficient of 0.22Cd and the Formula S GT wagon is 0.25Cd.

The interior features a 17.3-inch floating central display. It uses BYD's "smart ecosystem 2.0" that combines PIN ports, magnetic accessories and threaded connectors to allow for customization. The sedan version has 600 L (21.2 cu ft) of rear cargo space expanding to 1,638 L (57.8 cu ft) with the rear seats folded down, while GT variants have 537 L (19.0 cu ft) expanding to 1,671 L (59.0 cu ft); either version is supplemented by a 151-litre (5.3 cu ft) frunk which can be opened with a double knock. The rear seats have access to a 9.3-litre (0.33 cu ft) under-seat storage drawer and a 6.9-litre (0.24 cu ft) refrigerator in the center console.

Two suspension systems can be chosen for the Formula S – DiSus-M and DiSus-A. DiSus-M is a newly developed magnetorheological suspension system that debuted on the Formula S, utilizing magnetorheological fluid to adjust damping within milliseconds; while DiSus-A uses dual-chamber air suspension combined with variable-damping shock absorbers to prioritize comfort. Fangchengbao says that 85.4% of the chassis consists of high strength steel and aluminium, including 2000MPa hot-formed steel integral moldings.

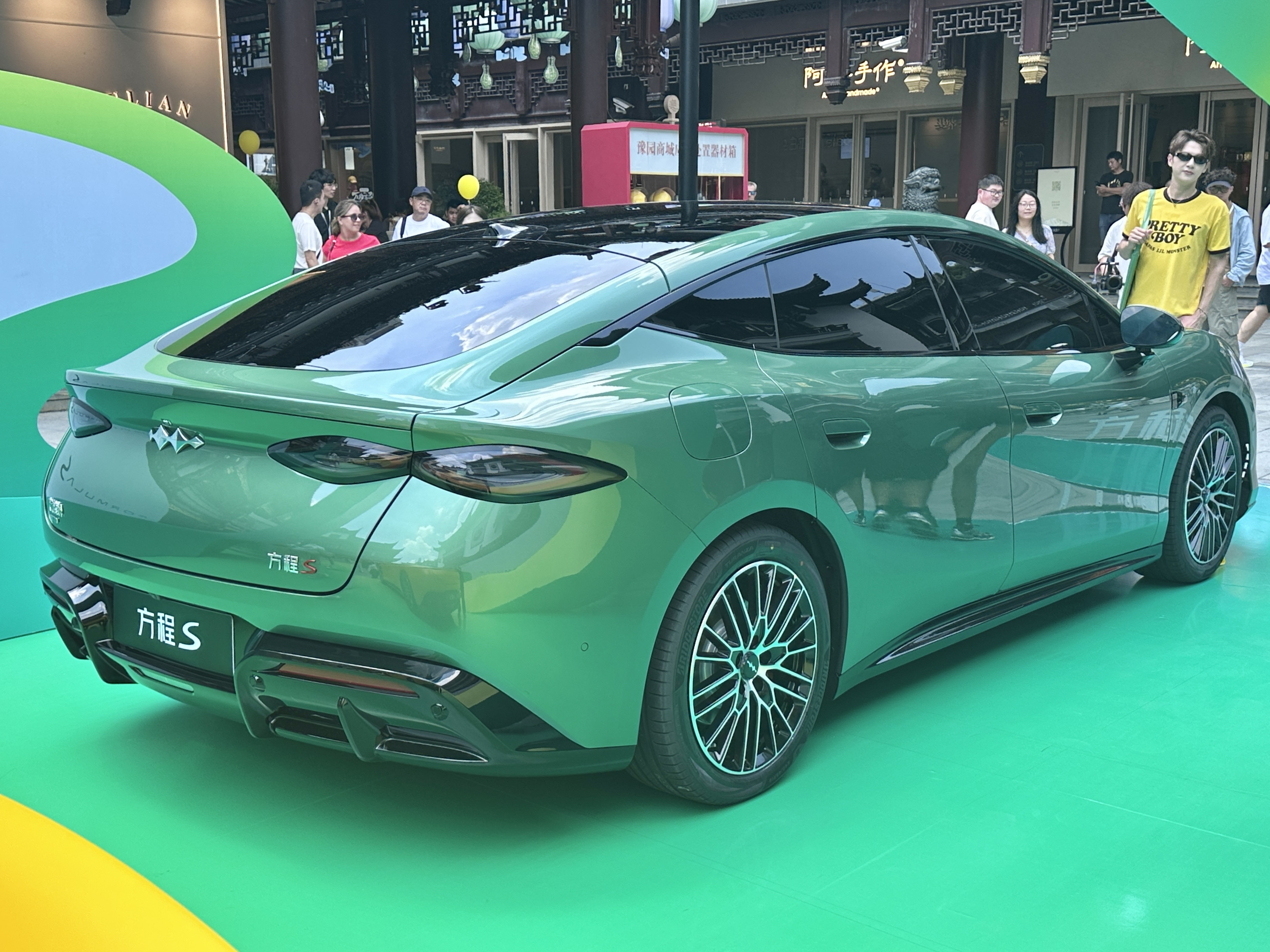
Rear view

Interior

Fangchengbao Formula S GT

Rear view

== Powertrain ==
The Formula S is available three powertrain options: rear-wheel-drive single motor variants producing either 245 kW (329 hp) or 300 kW (400 hp), and an all-wheel-drive dual motor variant producing 490 kW (660 hp). The single motor variants have 720 km (450 mi) and 830–900 km (520–560 mi) of CLTC range respectively.

Two powertrain options are available for the S GT: a single motor variant with 300 kW (400 hp) and 800–850 km (500–530 mi) of CLTC range, and a dual motor variant with 490 kW (660 hp) and 720 km (450 mi) of CLTC range. All models use BYD's second-generation "Blade" LFP battery.

Specifications
Battery		Motor		Power	Range	0–100 km/h (62 mph)	Top speed	Kerb weight
Type	Weight	Front	Rear	Power	CLTC	0–100 km/h (62 mph)	Top speed	Kerb weight
Sedan
76.744 kWh Blade 2.0 LFP	539 kg (1,188 lb)	—	245 kW TZ205QYS PMSM	328 hp (245 kW; 333 PS)	730 km (454 mi)	5.8 sec	240 km/h (149 mph)	1,999 kg (4,407 lb)
92.093 kWh Blade 2.0 LFP	644 kg (1,420 lb)	—	300 kW TZ205QYD PMSM	402 hp (300 kW; 408 PS)	900 km (559 mi)	5.8 sec	240 km/h (149 mph)	2,140 kg (4,718 lb)
92.093 kWh Blade 2.0 LFP	644 kg (1,420 lb)	190 kW YS230XYF induction	300 kW TZ205QYD PMSM	657 hp (490 kW; 666 PS)	750 km (466 mi)	3.6 sec	240 km/h (149 mph)	2,250 kg (4,960 lb)
GT
92.093 kWh Blade 2.0 LFP	644 kg (1,420 lb)	—	300 kW TZ205QYD PMSM	402 hp (300 kW; 408 PS)	850 km (528 mi)	5.8 sec	240 km/h (149 mph)	2,170 kg (4,784 lb)
92.093 kWh Blade 2.0 LFP	644 kg (1,420 lb)	190 kW YS230XYF induction	300 kW TZ205QYD PMSM	657 hp (490 kW; 666 PS)	730 km (454 mi)	3.6 sec	240 km/h (149 mph)	2,280 kg (5,027 lb)
