= Auto China =

Auto show in China

- Native name: 北京国际汽车展览会
- English name: Beijing Auto Show
- Time: 1990; 36 years ago
- Website: http://www.autochinashow.org/

Beijing International Automotive Exhibition (Chinese: 北京国际汽车展览会), Beijing Motor Show (Chinese: 北京车展) or Auto China is an auto show held biennially in Beijing, China since 1990.

== 2026 ==
The 2026 Auto China show dates are scheduled for 24 April - 3 May 2026 at the New China International Exhibition Centre.

=== Production cars ===
- 212 T10
- 212 Expedition Platform X
- Aion N60
- Aistaland GT7
- AITO M6
- AITO M9 (facelift)
  - AITO M9 Ultimate (facelift)
- Arcfox S3
- Arcfox Wendao V9
- Audi A6L (redesign)
- Audi A6L e-tron
- AUDI E7X
- Beijing 81VJ
- Beijing CityHunter
- BMW 7 Series (G70) (facelift)
- BMW i3 (NA0) (LWB)
- BMW i7 (facelift)
- BMW iX3 (LWB)
- Buick Electra E7
- BYD Datang
- BYD Seal 08
- BYD Sealion 08
- BYD Yuan Plus (redesign)
- Chery Arrizo S
- Chery Fulwin A9L GT
- Chery Fulwin A9 Wagon
- Chery Tiggo V
- Chery Tiggo X
- Denza D9 (facelift)
- Denza Z Convertible
- Epicland X9
- Exeed EX7
- Fangchengbao Formula S
  - Fangchengbao Formula S GT
  - Fangchengbao Formula SL
- Forthing Xinghai V6
- Geely Galaxy A7 EV
- Geely Galaxy Starship 7 EV
- Geely Galaxy Starshine 7
- Geely Galaxy M7
- Hongqi H7 (redesign)
- Hongqi H9 (redesign)
- Hongqi Global SUV
- Hongqi G919 (P567)
- Huajing S
- Hyptec S600
- Hyundai Ioniq V
- Jetour Freedom 7 Plus
- Jetour Freedom 7X
- Jetour Huanyouzhe
- Jetour Shanghai L10
- Jetour Traveller 8
- Jetour Traveller Plus
- Jetour Zongheng F700
- Jetta M6 (prototype)
- Leapmotor D99
- Li L9 Livis
- Luxeed V9
- Mercedes-Benz GLC Electric (LWB)
- Mercedes-Benz S-Class (W223) (facelift)
- Nio ES9
- Onvo L90 (facelift)
- SAIC Z7
  - SAIC Z7T
- Smart #6 EHD
- Trumpchi Xiangwang E8
- Trumpchi Yue 7
- Volkswagen ID. Aura T6
- Volkswagen ID. Era 9X
- Volkswagen ID. Unyx 07
- Volkswagen ID. Unyx 08
- Volkswagen ID. Unyx 09
- Volkswagen Passat ePro
- Volkswagen Tiguan L ePro
- Voyah Taishan X8
- Wey V9X
- Wuling Starlight L
- Xiaomi SU7 (facelift)
- Xiaomi YU7 GT (teaser)
- XPeng GX

=== Concept cars ===
- BYD Ocean-V
- Chery Arrizo X
- Citroën ELO
- Dongfeng EQ-Reborn
- Exeed EX9
- Exeed EX Vision
- Exeed X-Concept
- Fangchengbao Formula X
- Geely Eva Cab
- Geely Galaxy Light 2nd
- Hongqi S-Concept
- Hyundai Earth
- Hyundai Venus
- iCar Robox
- Jetta X
- Lynk & Co GT
- Nissan Terrano PHEV concept
- Nissan Urban PHEV concept
- Peugeot Concept 6 Shirui
- Peugeot Concept 8 Luming
- Peugeot Polygon
- Roewe Jiayue 07
- Smart #2
- Xiaomi Vision Gran Turismo

== 2024 ==
The 2024 Auto China show dates are scheduled for 25 April - 4 May 2024 at the New China International Exhibition Centre.

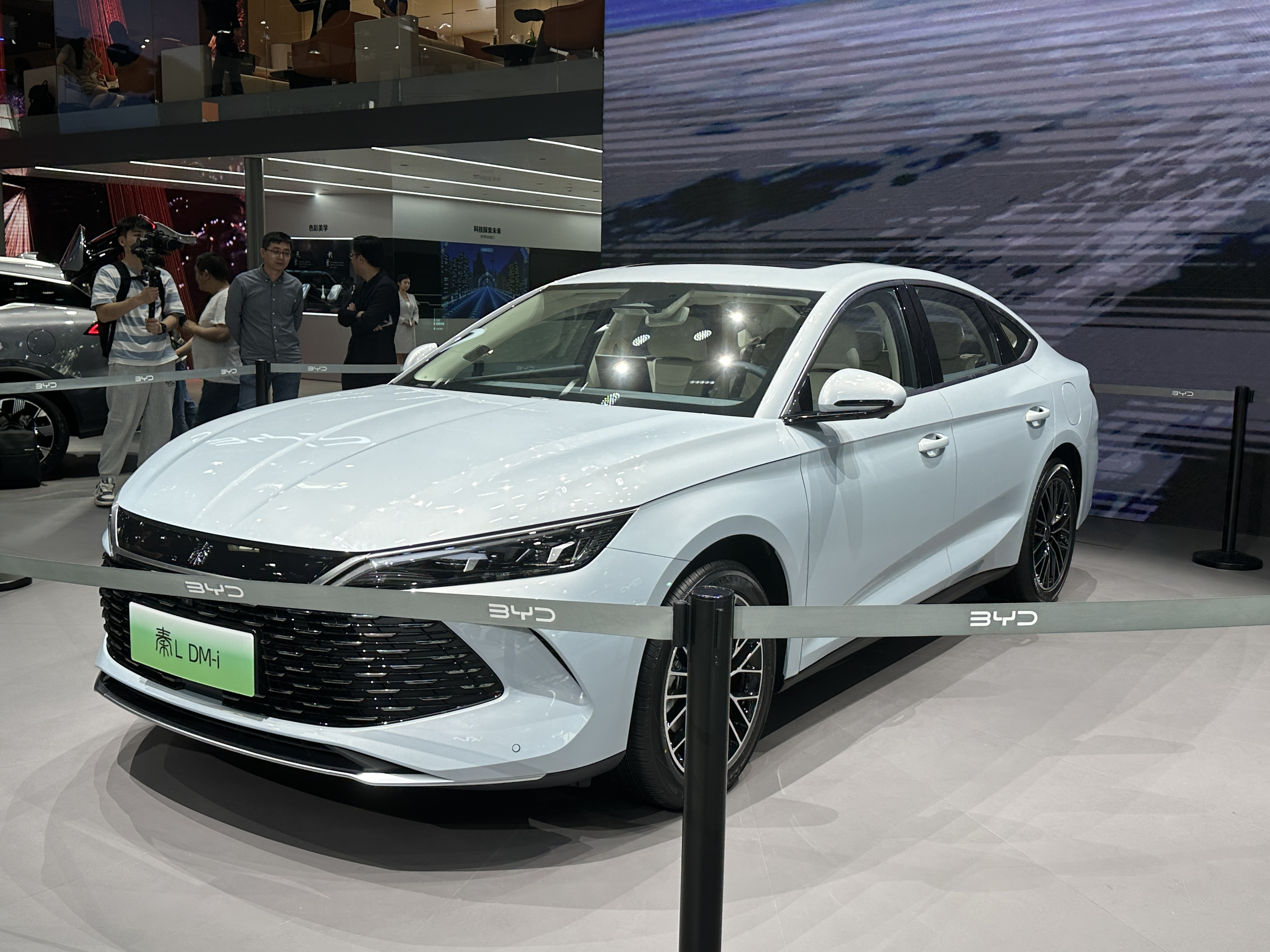
BYD Qin L DM-i

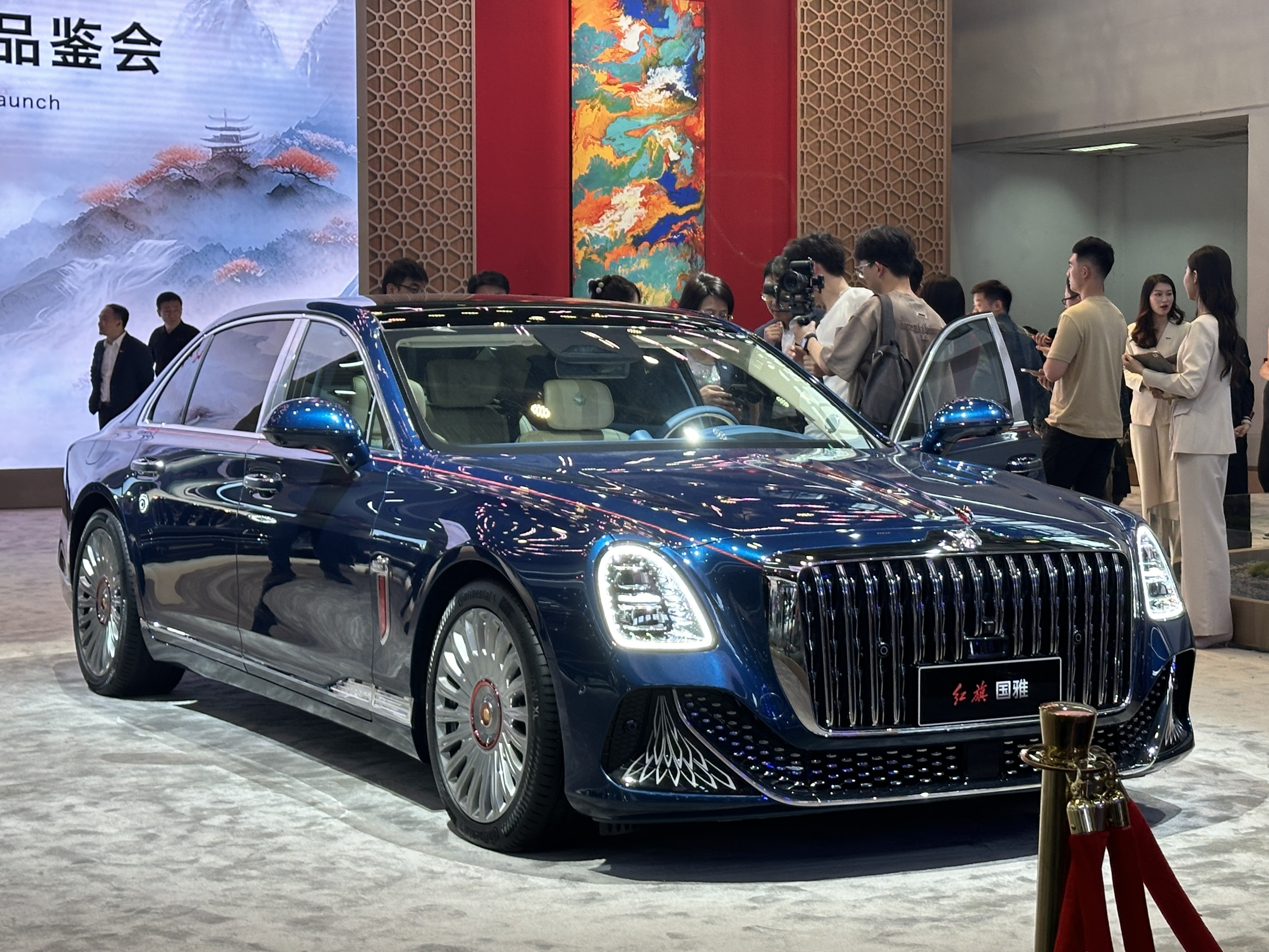
Hongqi Guoya

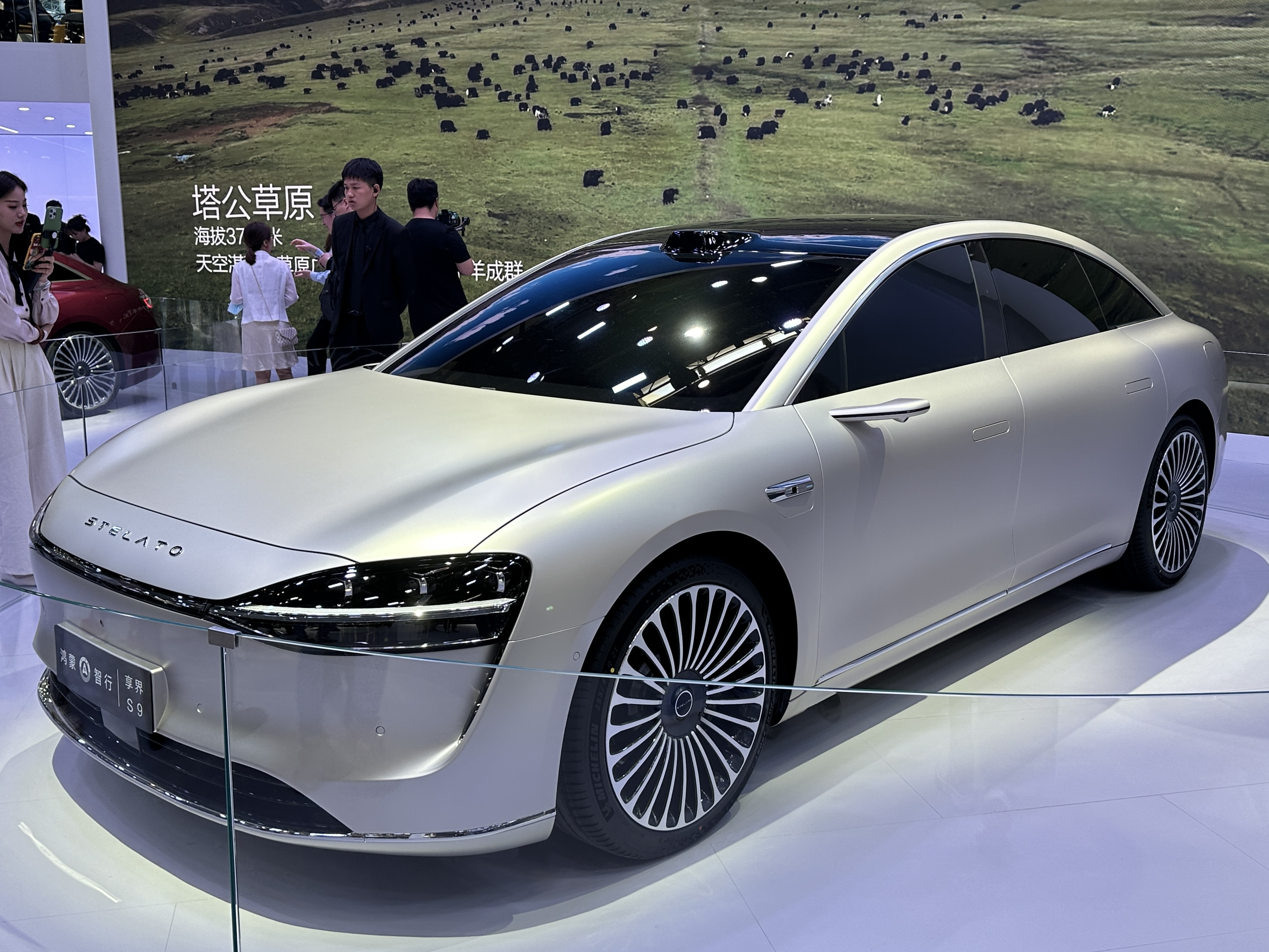
Stelato S9

=== Production cars ===
- Audi Q6L e-tron
- Aeolus L7
- Aion V (redesign)
- Bentley Mulliner Batur
- BMW 4 Series Gran Coupe (facelift)
- BMW i4 (facelift)
- Buick GL8 PHEV
- BYD Qin L
- BYD Seal 06 DM-i
- BYD Sealion 07 EV
- Cadillac Optiq
- Chery Fulwin T9
- Chery Fulwin T10
- Chery Tiggo 8 (facelift)
- Chery Tiggo 9 (global)
- Chevrolet Equinox EV
- Changan Hunter
- Changan Nevo E07
- Changan UNI-Z
- Deepal G318
- Denza Z9 GT
- Dongfeng eπ 008
- Forthing Xinghai S7
- Fangchengbao Bao 8
- Haval H6 (facelift)
- Haval H9 (redesign)
- Honda Ye P7
- Honda Ye S7
- Honda e:NP2
- Honda e:NS2
- Hongqi Guoli
- Hongqi Guoya
- Hongqi H9 (facelift)
- Hongqi HQ9 PHEV
- Hongqi Guoyao
- Hongqi EH7
- Hongqi EHS7
- IM L6
- iCar V23
- Ji Yue 07
- Jetour Shanhai T7
- Jetour Shanhai L6
- Jetour Shanhai L7
- Jetour Shanhai P5
- Jetour Shanhai T1
- Jaecoo J7 PHEV (global)
- Jaecoo J8 PHEV (global)
- Kia Sonet (facelift)
- Lamborghini Urus SE
- Leapmotor C16
- Li Mega
- Li L6
- Lingxi L
- Lynk & Co 07
- Mercedes-Benz G-Class Electric
- Mercedes-AMG GT 63 S E Performance
- Mercedes-Benz EQS (facelift)
- M-Hero M-Hunter
- M-Hero 917 Jiaolongzhanjia
- Mini Aceman
- Mazda EZ-6
- Neta L
- Omoda E5 (global)
- Porsche Macan EV
- Stelato S9
- Toyota bZ3X
- Toyota bZ3C
- Toyota GR Yaris (facelift)
- Volkswagen Tiguan L Pro
- Volkswagen Magotan (redesign)
- Volkswagen ID.UNYX
- Volvo EX30
- Wuling Binguo SUV
- Xiaomi SU7
- Yangwang U7
- Zeekr 009 Grand
- Zeekr Mix

=== Concept cars ===
- BMW Vision Neue Klasse Concept
- BYD OCEAN-M
- Buick Electra-LT
- Buick Electra-L
- Chery Fulwin E06
- Dongfeng eπ2024
- Exeed E08 Concept
- Fangchengbao Super 3
- Fangchengbao Super 9
- Geely Galaxy Starship
- Genesis G80 EV Magma
- Honda Ye GT Concept
- Hongqi Golden sunflower Concept
- Hongqi E007
- Hongqi E009
- Hongqi E702
- iCar X25
- Jetour Shanhai T5 (entered production as the Jetour Zongheng G700)
- MG EXE181
- Mercedes-Benz Concept CLA Class
- Mazda Arata
- Nissan Era
- Nissan Epoch
- Nissan Evo
- Nissan Epic
- Nissan Hyper Force
- Smart Concept #5
- Toyota bZ SatisfiedSpace Concept
- Volkswagen ID.Code

== 2022 ==
The 2022 Auto China show was scheduled to be held between April 21–30, 2022, but was cancelled due to continuing concerns of Coronavirus.

== 2020 ==
The 2020 Auto China show was due to open on 21 April but has been postponed due to health concerns relating to the Coronavirus. The new dates for 2020 were 26 September to 5 October.

=== Production cars ===
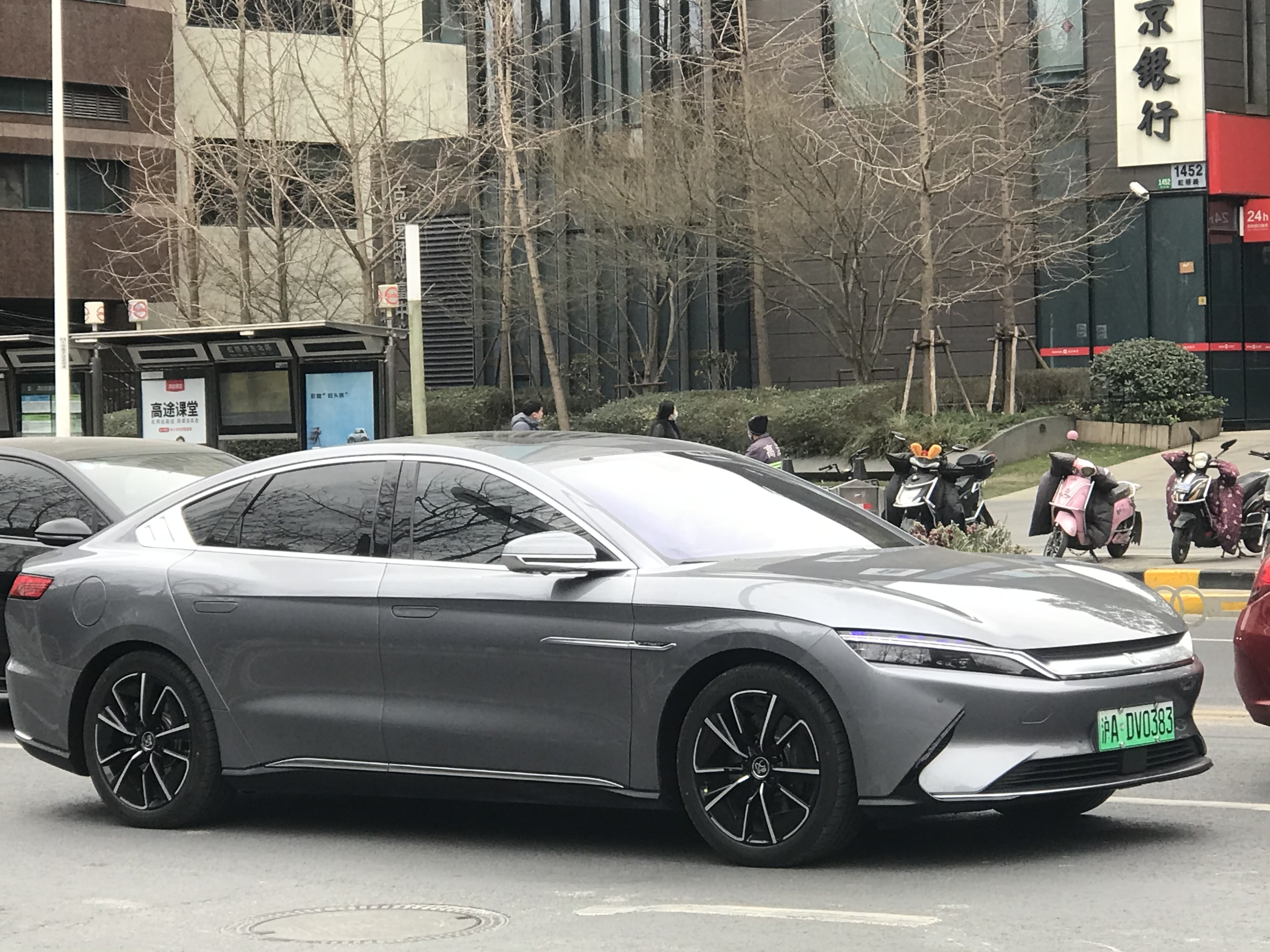
BYD Han EV

- Audi A6 (facelift)
- Aston Martin DB5 GT-R Zagato
- Aston Martin Vantage GT3
- BAIC Arcfox Alpha T
- Baojun RC-5W
- BMW 4 Series (G22) (redesign)
- BYD Han
- BYD Han EV
- Hongqi E115
- Hyundai Santa Fe (facelift)
- Hyundai Tucson (redesign)
- Maserati Ghibli Hybrid
- Maserati MC20
- Mercedes-Benz S-Class (redesign)
- Mercedes-Benz EQA
- Mercedes-AMG GT Black Series
- MG 5
- Neta EP12
- Nio Formula E 2020–2021
- Nio EC6
- Nio ET5
- Nio ET7
- Nissan Ariya
- Rolls-Royce Ghost (redesign)
- Rimac C Two
- Polestar 3
- Soueast EX6
- Volkswagen ID.4
- Wuling Victory

=== Concept cars ===
- Audi AI:YOU
- Leap Motors C-Culture
- Lynk & Co Zero
- Maxus XJC
- MG Cyberster
- Hyundai Prophecy EV
- Hozon Eureka 03
- Roewe R-Aura
- Volkswagen ID Rockezz

== 2018 ==
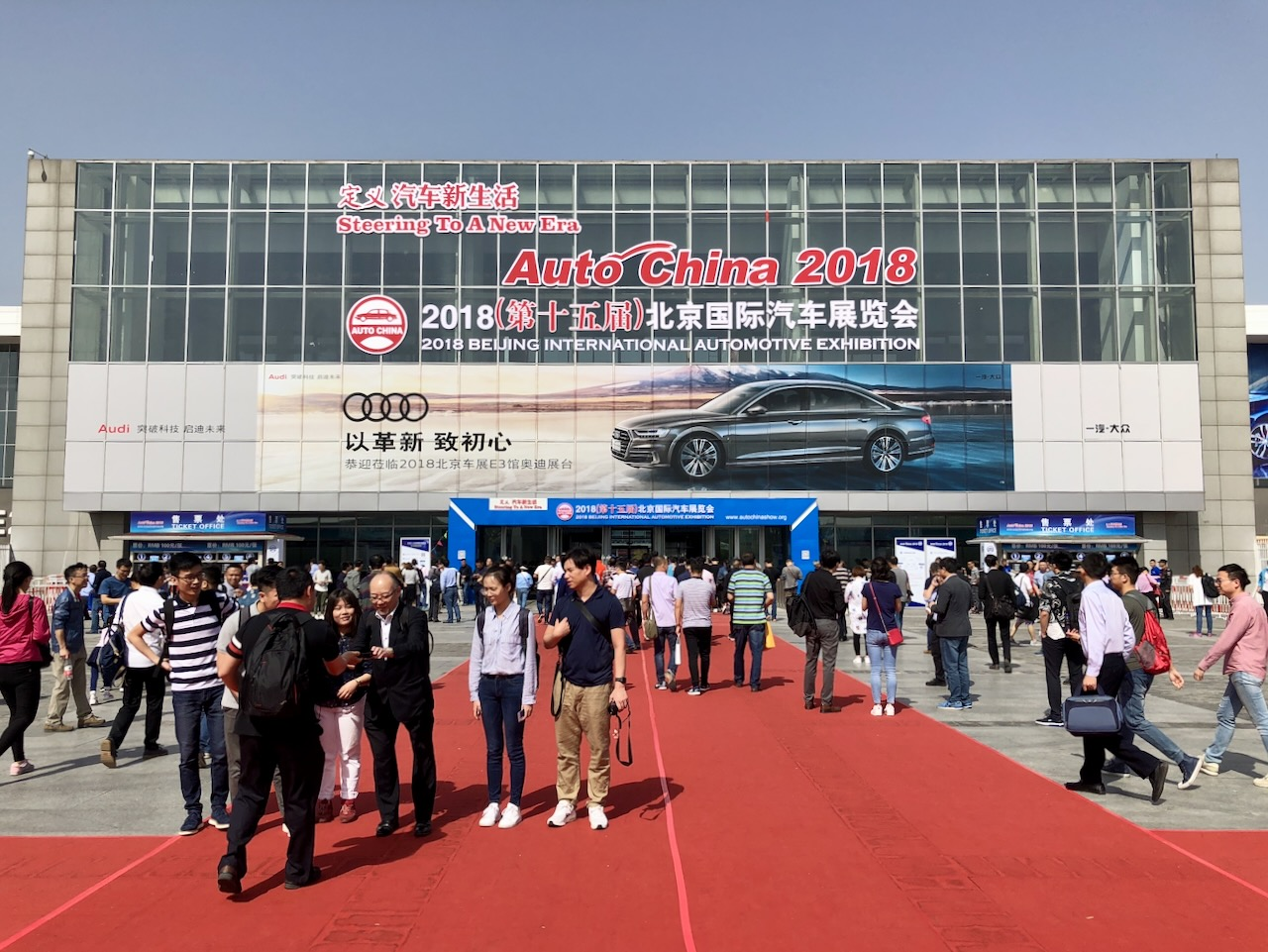
Entrance to Auto China 2018

=== Production cars ===
- Mercedes-Benz A-Class (long-wheelbase saloon)
- BMW M2 Competition
- Lexus ES
- Škoda Kamiq
- Volkswagen Touareg

=== Concept cars ===
- BMW iX3
- DS X E-Tense
- Mercedes-Maybach Ultimate Luxury SUV Concept
- MG X-Motion
- Pininfarina K350 Concept
- Pininfarina H500 Concept

== 2016 ==
=== Production cars ===
- Acura CDX
- Audi TT RS Coupe
- Bentley Mulsanne
- BMW X1 LWB
- BMW M4 GTS
- BMW M760Li xDrive
- Citroën C6
- DS 4S
- Ferrari GTC4Lusso (Asian debut)
- Geely Emgrand GS
- Jaguar XF L
- Lexus IS (facelift)
- Mazda CX-4
- Mercedes-Benz E-Class LWB
- Nissan Tiida
- Porsche 718 Cayman S
- Renault Koleos

=== Concept cars ===
- BAIC Arcfox-7 Concept
- BMW Concept Compact Sedan
- Chery FV2030 Concept
- Infiniti QX Sport Inspiration Concept
- LeEco LeSee Concept
- Volkswagen T-Prime Concept GTE
- Dongfeng Fengshen S30 PHEV concept

== 2014 ==
Auto China 2014 was held at New China International Exhibition Center from April 20 to April 29.

=== Production cars ===
- Baojun 730
- Bugatti Veyron Grand Sport Vitesse Black Bess
- DS 6WR
- Kia K3S
- Koenigsegg One:1 (Asian debut)
- Lamborghini Aventador Nazionale
- Mercedes-Benz C-Class LWB
- Rolls-Royce Phantom Pinnacle Travel
- Soueast V6 Lingshi Cross

=== Concept cars ===
- Audi TT Allroad Concept

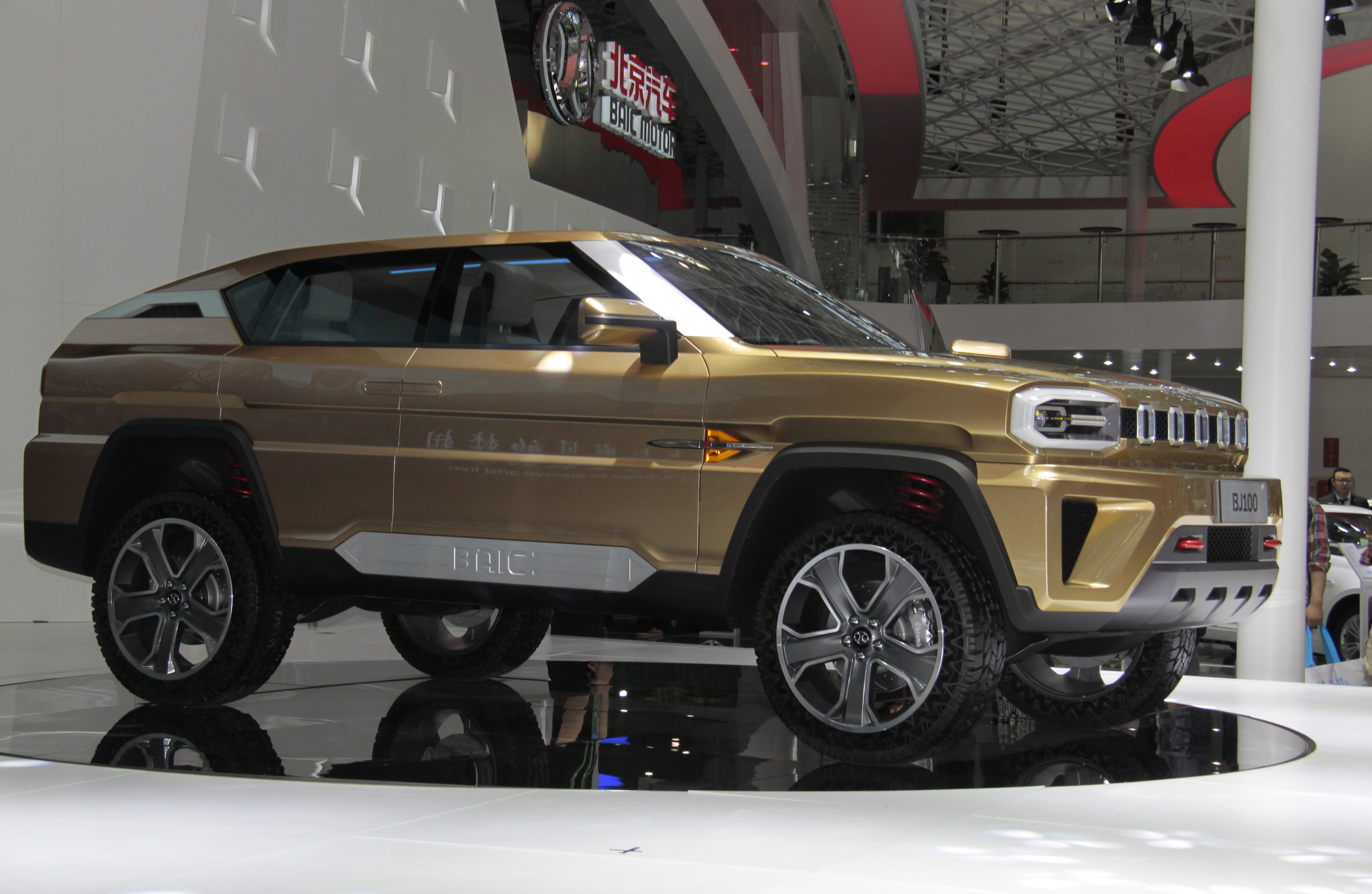
BAIC BJ100 at Auto China 2014

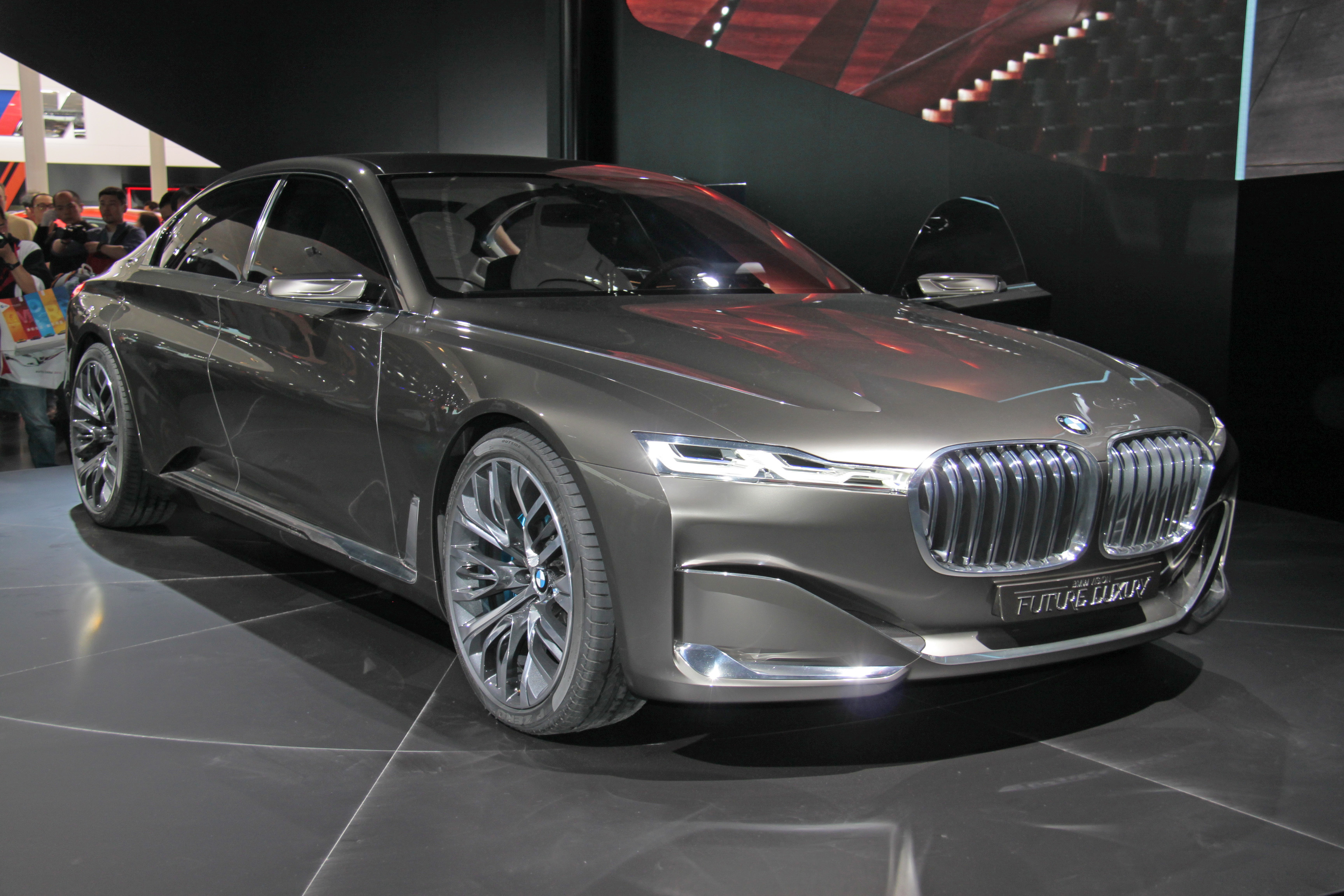
BMW Vision Future Luxury at Auto China 2014

- BAIC BJ100
- BMW Vision Future Luxury Sedan
- Chery Concept Alpha
- Chery Beta 5 Concept
- FAW Besturn Pi
- Ford Everest Concept
- GAC Trumpchi E-Jet
- GAC Trumpchi GA6 Concept
- Geely Emgrand Cross PHEV
- Honda Spirior Concept
- Hyundai ix25 Concept
- JAC SC-9 Concept
- Lincoln MKX Concept
- Mercedes-Benz Concept Coupé SUV
- Volkswagen Golf R 400 Concept

== 2012 ==
=== Production cars ===
- Aston Martin Dragon 88 Editions
- Bentley Mulsanne Diamond Jubilee Edition
- BMW 328Li and 335Li
- BMW 7 Series Facelift
- Bugatti Veyron Grand Sport Wei Long
- Ferrari 458 Year Of The Dragon Edition
- Infiniti M35hL
- Jaguar XJ Ultimate
- Land Rover Evoque Special Edition With Victoria Beckham
- Lotus Evora GTE China Limited Edition
- Mercedes-Benz G63 & G65 AMG
- Nissan Sylphy
- Porsche Cayenne GTS
- Roewe 950
- Rolls-Royce Phantom Series II Extended Wheelbase
- Subaru Outback sedan
- Volkswagen E-Bugster Cabrio
- Volkswagen Lavida

=== Concept cars ===
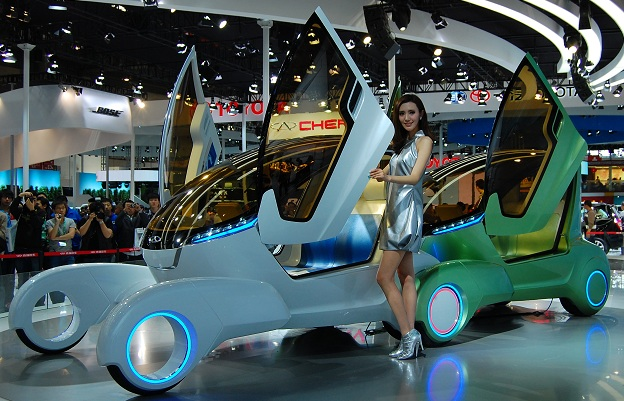
Chery @Ant at Auto China 2012

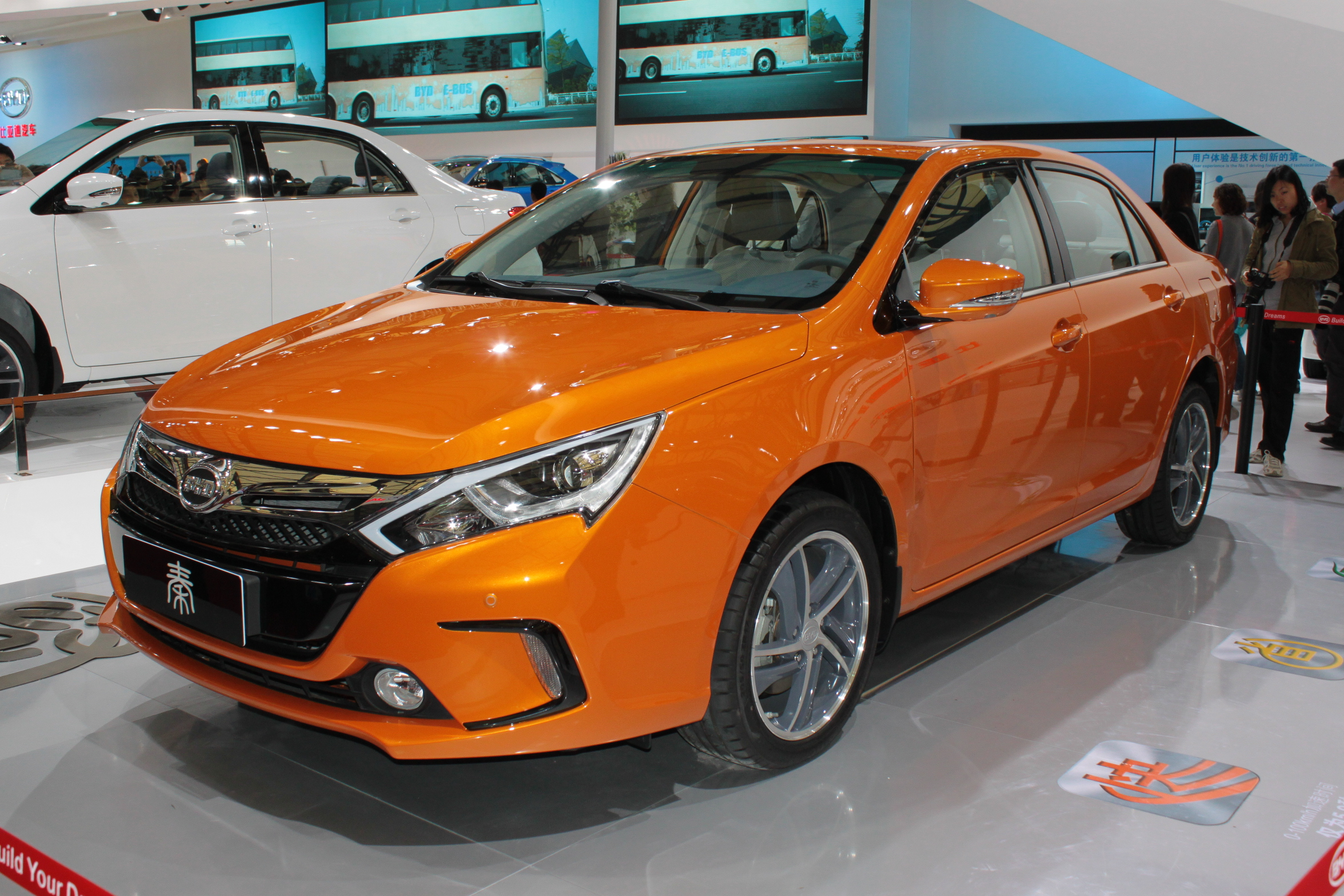
BYD Qin

- Audi A6L e-tron
- Audi Q3 Jinlong Yufeng
- Audi RS Q3
- BMW i8 Spyder plug-in hybrid
- Chery @Ant
- Chrysler 300 Ruyi Design
- Citroen Numero 9
- Fiat Viaggio
- Honda Concept C
- Honda Concept S
- Jeep Wrangler Dragon Design
- Mercedes-Benz Concept Style Coupe
- Lamborghini Urus
- BYD Qin (pronounced “Chin”) plug-in hybrid
- Rolls-Royce Ghost Six Senses
- SEAT Ibiza Cupra
- Škoda Rapid
- Toyota Dear Qin Hatchback and Sedan
- Toyota Yundong Shuangqing

== 2010 ==
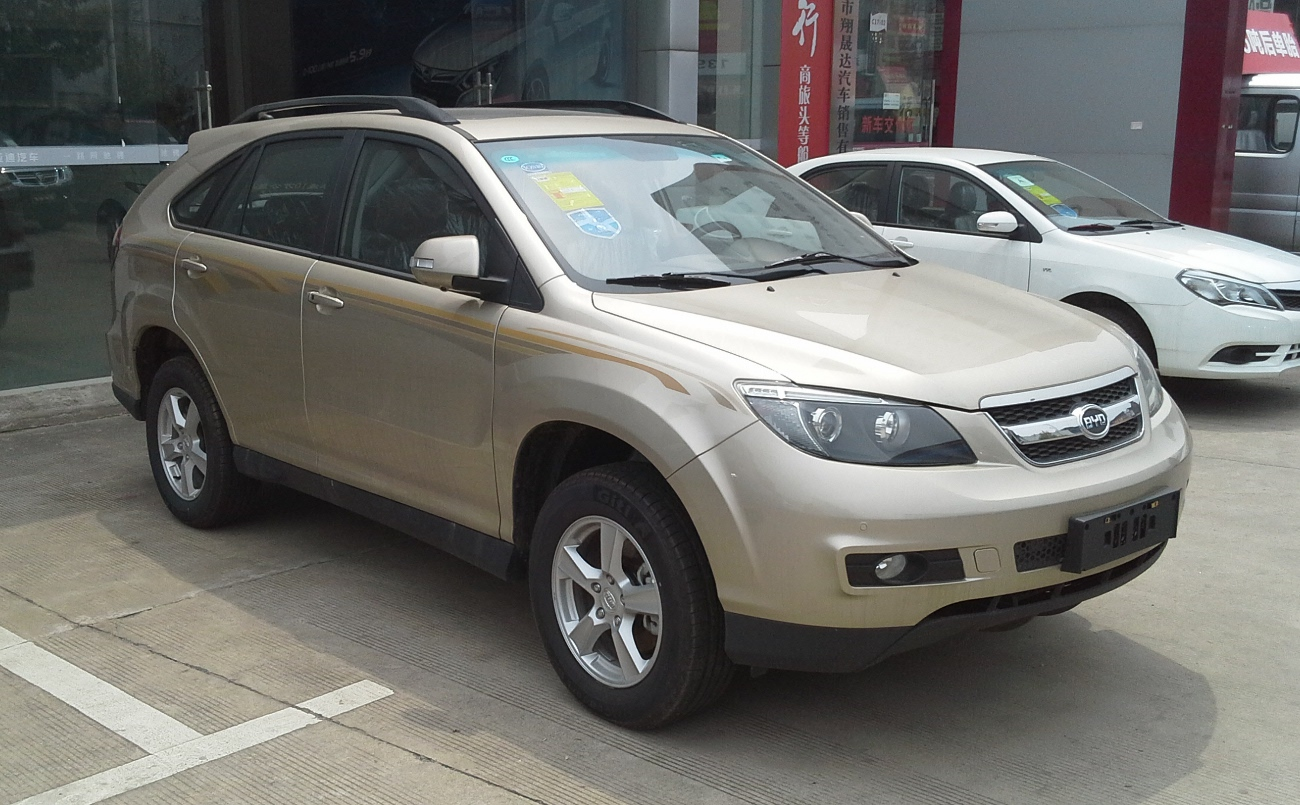
BYD S6 is China's "SUV of the Year" according to the Annual Ranking of Chinese Automobiles – the highest honor in the China Automotive Industry.

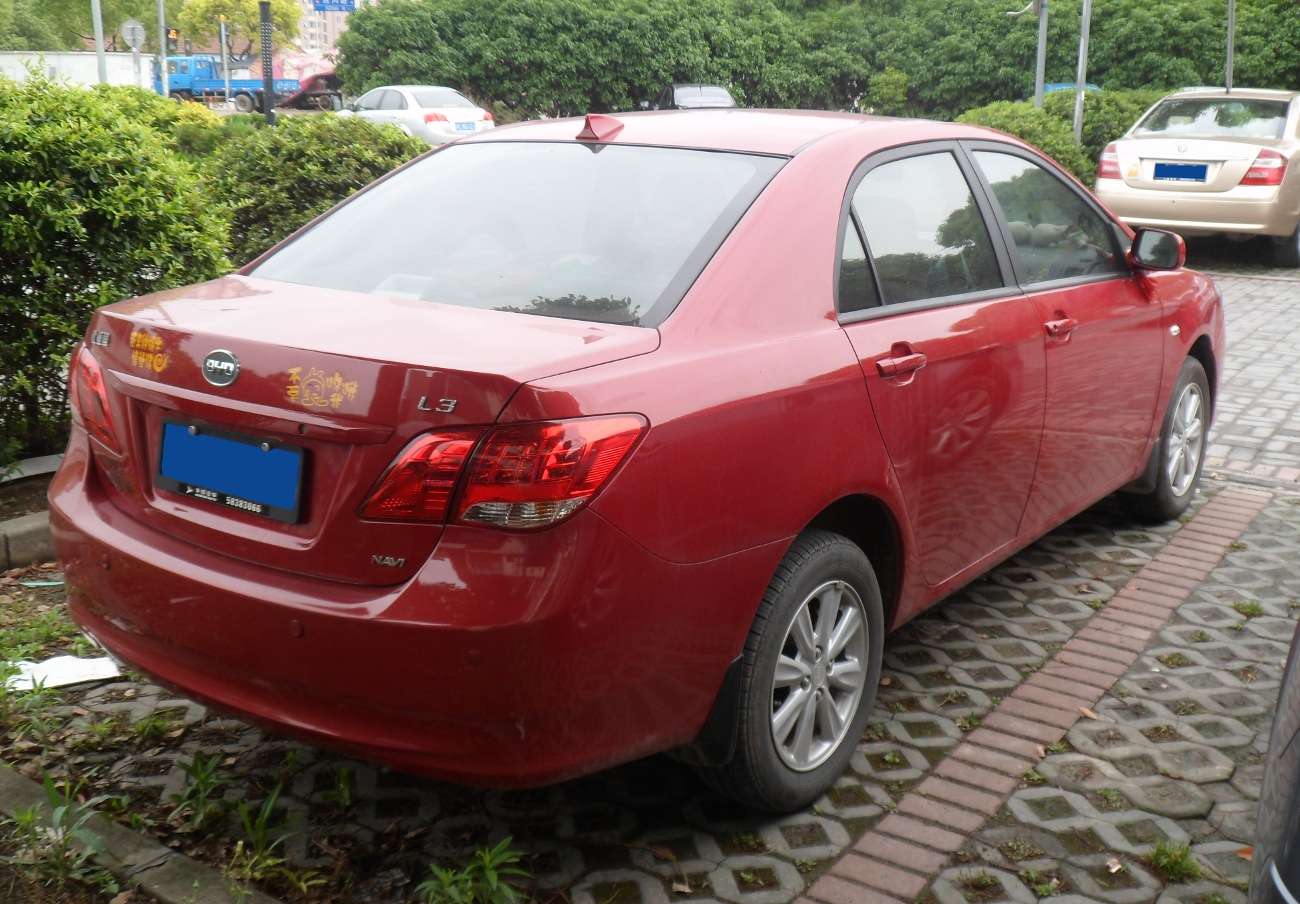
BYD L3

Auto China 2010 was held at China International Exhibition Center from April 23 to May 2.

The following major introductions were presented at the 2010 show:

=== Production cars ===
- Audi A8 L & W12
- Audi A8 Hybrid (Chinese Introduction)
- Beijing Automobile Works 007
- BMW 5 series LWB
- Bentley Continental GT Design Series China special edition
- Bentley Continental Flying Spur Speed China special edition
- Brilliance BS4 facelift
- Brilliance FSV
- Brilliance Jinbei H2L
- BYD I6
- BYD L3
- BYD S6
- Chery Rely X5
- Chery Riich G3
- Chery Riich G6
- Chery Riich M1
- Chery Riich X1
- Chevrolet Sail 5-door hatchback
- Chevrolet Spark (Chinese Introduction)
- Dongfeng Fengshan H30 Cross
- Dongfeng Fengshan S30 BSG Hybrid
- Ferrari 599 GTO
- Ford Edge (Chinese Introduction)
- Ford Focus (Chinese Introduction)
- Great Wall Haval H6
- Great Wall Haval M3
- Great Wall Haval SC60
- Great Wall Voleex C50
- Great Wall Voleex C70
- Hawtai B11
- Hawtai B35
- Honda Crosstour (Chinese Introduction)
- Hongqi HQE
- Hyundai Verna
- Infiniti QX56 (Chinese Introduction)
- Kia SL (Chinese Introduction)
- Lamborghini Murciélago LP 670-4 SuperVeloce China Limited Edition
- Lifan SUV
- Maybach 57/62 facelift
- Mazda 8 (Chinese Introduction)
- Mercedes-Benz E-Class LWB
- Mercedes-Benz SLS AMG (Chinese Introduction)
- Mini Countryman (Chinese Introduction)
- Mitsubishi ASX (Chinese Introduction)
- Nissan Leaf (Chinese Introduction)
- Nissan March (Chinese Introduction)
- Nissan NV200 (Chinese Introduction)
- Porsche Cayenne (Chinese Introduction)
- Porsche Panamera V6
- Roewe 350
- Roewe 550 XT
- Roewe 750 Hybrid
- Škoda Octavia facelift (Chinese Introduction)
- Suzuki Kizashi (Chinese Introduction)
- Volkswagen CC (Chinese Introduction)
- Volkswagen Phaeton facelift
- Volkswagen Sharan (Chinese Introduction)
- Volkswagen Touareg Hybrid (Chinese Introduction)
- Volvo S60 (Chinese Introduction)
- Wuling Hong Guang
- Youngman Europestar Lotus L5
- ZAP Electric Taxi
- Zotye Lang Jie
- Zotye Lang Jun
- Zotye Multiplan

=== Concept cars ===
- BAIC B40
- BAIC B61
- BAIC B90 Hybrid
- BAIC C60 (based on Saab 9-3)
- BAIC C70 EV Concept
- BAIC C71 & C71 EV (based on Saab 9-5)
- BAIC EV Concept
- BMW Concept Gran Coupe
- BMW Megacity Concept
- Brilliance EV Concept
- Cadillac Converj Concept (Chinese Introduction)
- Cadillac XTS Platinum Concept (Chinese Introduction)
- Chang'an Mermaid Concept
- Chang'an Green-i Concept
- Chevrolet Aveo RS Concept (Chinese Introduction)
- Chevrolet Volt MPV5 Concept
- FAW E-COO Concept
- FAW E-wing Concept
- Ford Start Concept
- GAC Trumpche
- Geely Emgrand GE
- Geely Emgrand GT
- Geely Englon TXN Taxi
- Geely Gleagle GS
- IAT eTAXI Concept
- IAT Wufeng 2 Concept
- IAT Zhufeng Concept
- JAC Vision IV
- Li Nian Everus Concept
- Mercedes-Benz Shooting Break Concept
- MG Zero Concept
- Mitsubishi Concept PX-MiEV (Chinese Introduction)
- Porsche 918 Spyder Concept (Chinese Introduction)
- Roewe E1 Concept
- SAIC Leaf Concept
- Toyota FT-86 Concept (Chinese Introduction)
- Volkswagen E-Lavida EV Concept
- Youngman Europestar Lotus L3 EV

== See also ==
- Automobile industry in China
- Auto Shanghai
- Auto Guangzhou
