= Fangchengbao =

Chinese electric car brand by BYD Auto

- Type: Division
- Industry: Automotive
- Founded: 2023; 3 years ago
- Area served: China
- Key people: Xiong Tianbo (general manager)
- Products: Automobiles
- Owner: BYD Auto

Chinese name
- Simplified Chinese: 方程豹
- Traditional Chinese: 方程豹
- Literal meaning: Formula Leopard
Transcriptions
Standard Mandarin
- Hanyu Pinyin: Fāngchéng bào
- Website: fangchengbao.com

Fangchengbao (Chinese: 方程豹; lit. 'formula leopard'), also known as Formula Bao or FCB, is a Chinese electric car brand owned by BYD Auto. The brand was introduced in June 2023, and mainly produces performance-oriented SUVs aimed at the off-road and track-focused segments.

The Fangchengbao brand is not marketed outside China, instead Fangchengbao models are exported with Denza or BYD branding.

== History ==
In 2023, BYD Auto launched two new brands: Yangwang, a line of advanced vehicles introduced in January, while Fangchengbao was announced on June 9, 2023. "Fangchengbao" translates to "formula leopard," and the logo reflects this mathematical concept.

On August 16, 2023, Fangchengbao released its first model, the Bao 5. It debuted at the Chengdu Auto Show and based on a Fangchengbao-specific body-on-frame platform called DMO (Dual Mode Off-road). The brand also revealed a prototype of its upcoming flagship, the Super 8 SUV, which is set for release in 2024 as the Bao 8. Production of the Bao 5 began in September, with the official market debut in China following in November. Within three days of the launch, the company reported 10,000 orders for the model.

At the Beijing Auto Show in April 2024, Fangchengbao revealed its expansion plans by announcing the flagship Bao 8 model, the compact Super 3 (previewing the upcoming Ti3), and the Super 9 sports car prototype. During the event, general manager Xiong Tianbo confirmed the brand's initial success, reporting 20,000 cars sold in China within six months. In June 2024, Fangchengbao introduced the Bao 3, a battery electric SUV that will be the most affordable model in its lineup.

Initially, the brand established its own directly-operated sales stores, in contrast with BYD that relies on a dealership network. In June 2024, Fangchengbao started recruiting dealerships to increase its reach. The first batch of dealer recruitment was open to China's 22 provinces, four municipalities and five autonomous regions.

In July 2024, Fangchengbao lowered the price of the Bao 5 model by 50,000 yuan in China to improve its competitiveness against Great Wall Motor's popular Tank series. This price cut led to dissatisfaction among early buyers, some of whom organized protests at Fangchengbao dealerships. Protesters displayed banners with statements such as, "I waited 3 months for car delivery, then Fangchengbao cuts 50,000 yuan in one day. I should have bought a Tank instead."

== Products ==
=== Bao Series ===
- Fangchengbao Bao 5 (2023–present), mid-size SUV, PHEV
- Fangchengbao Bao 8 (2024–present), full-size SUV, PHEV
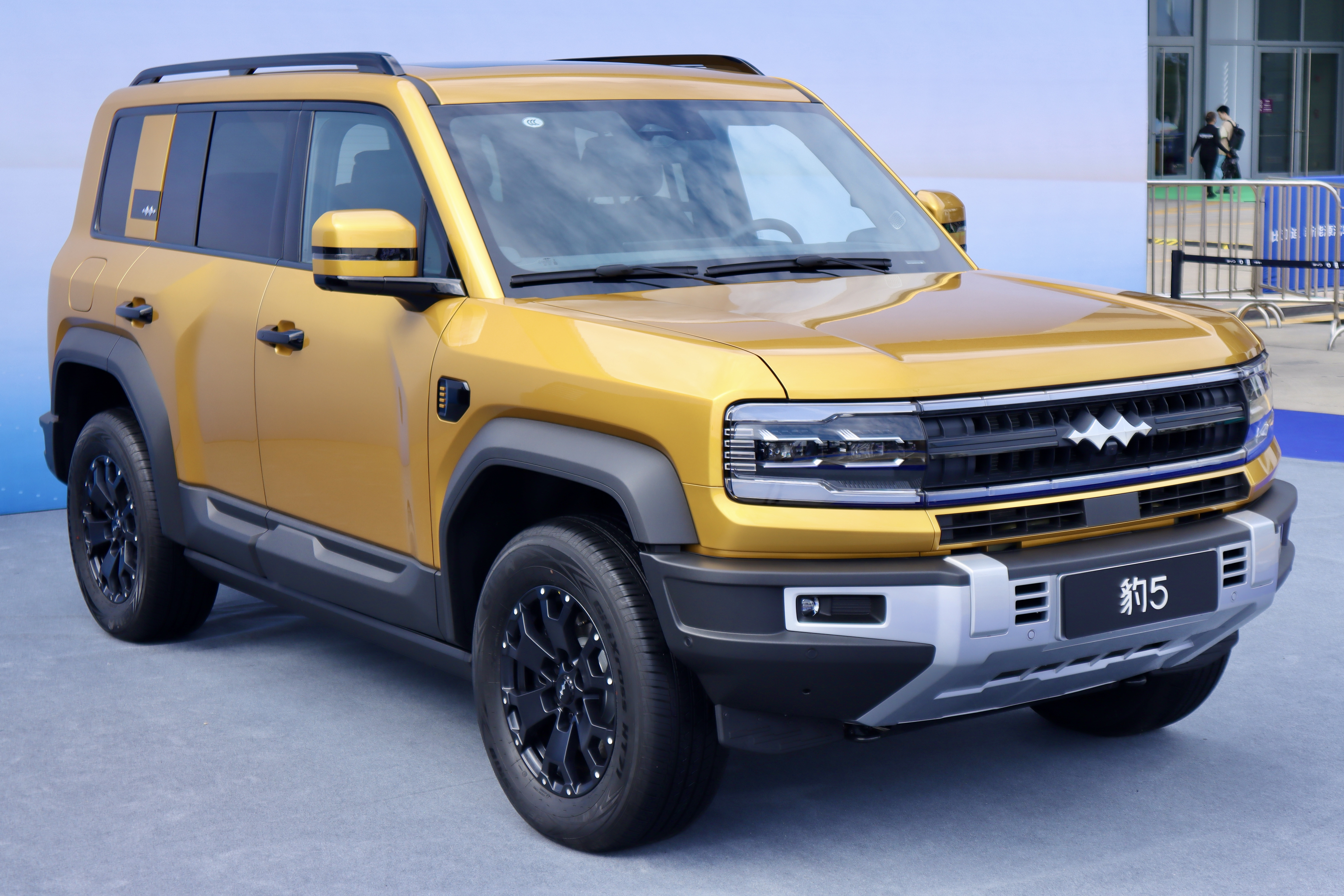
Fangchengbao Bao 5

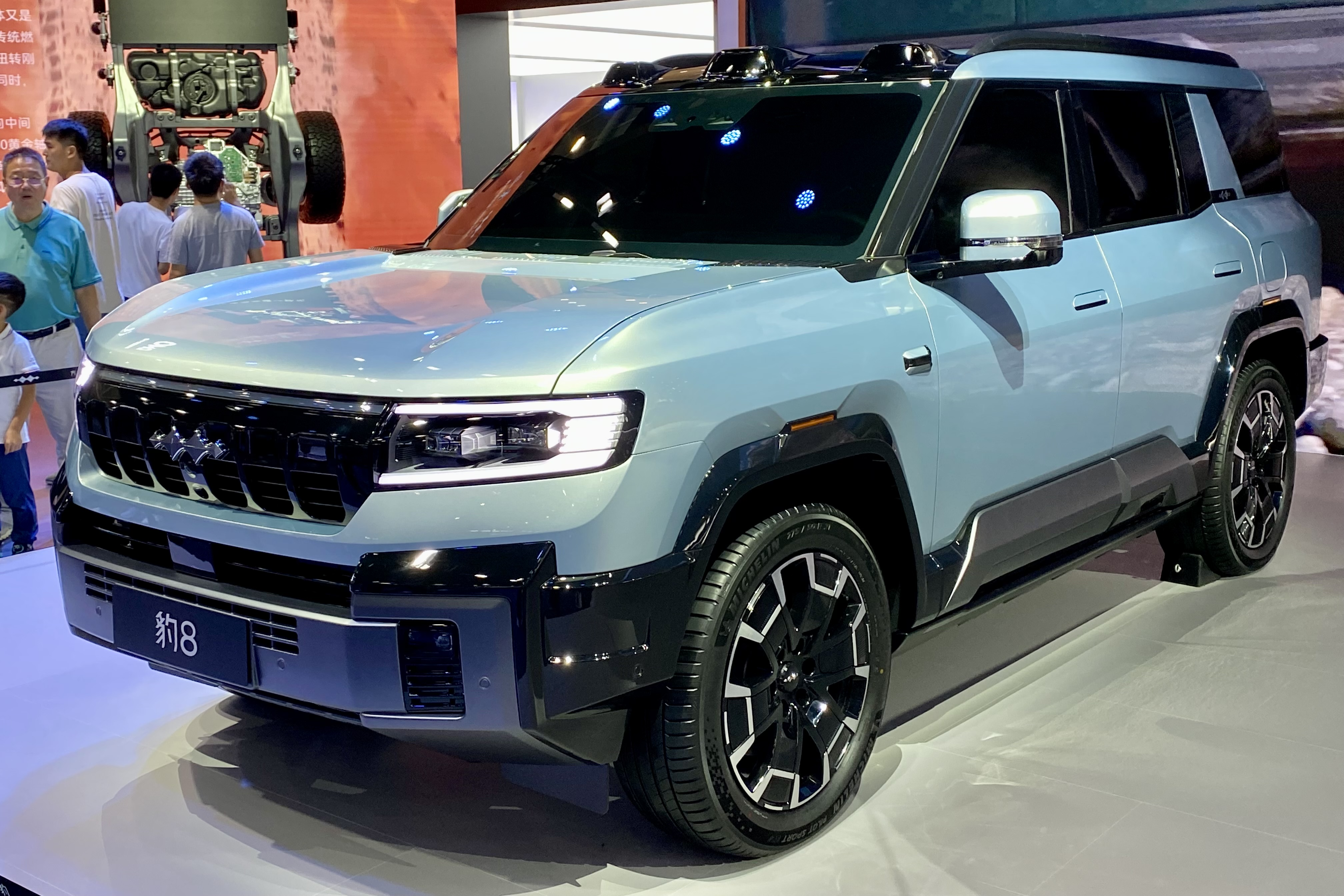
Fangchengbao Bao 8

=== Tai/Ti Series ===
- Fangchengbao Tai 3 (2025–present), compact SUV, BEV
- Fangchengbao Ti7 (2025–present), mid-size SUV, PHEV/BEV
- Fangchengbao Ti9 (2026–present), full-size SUV, PHEV
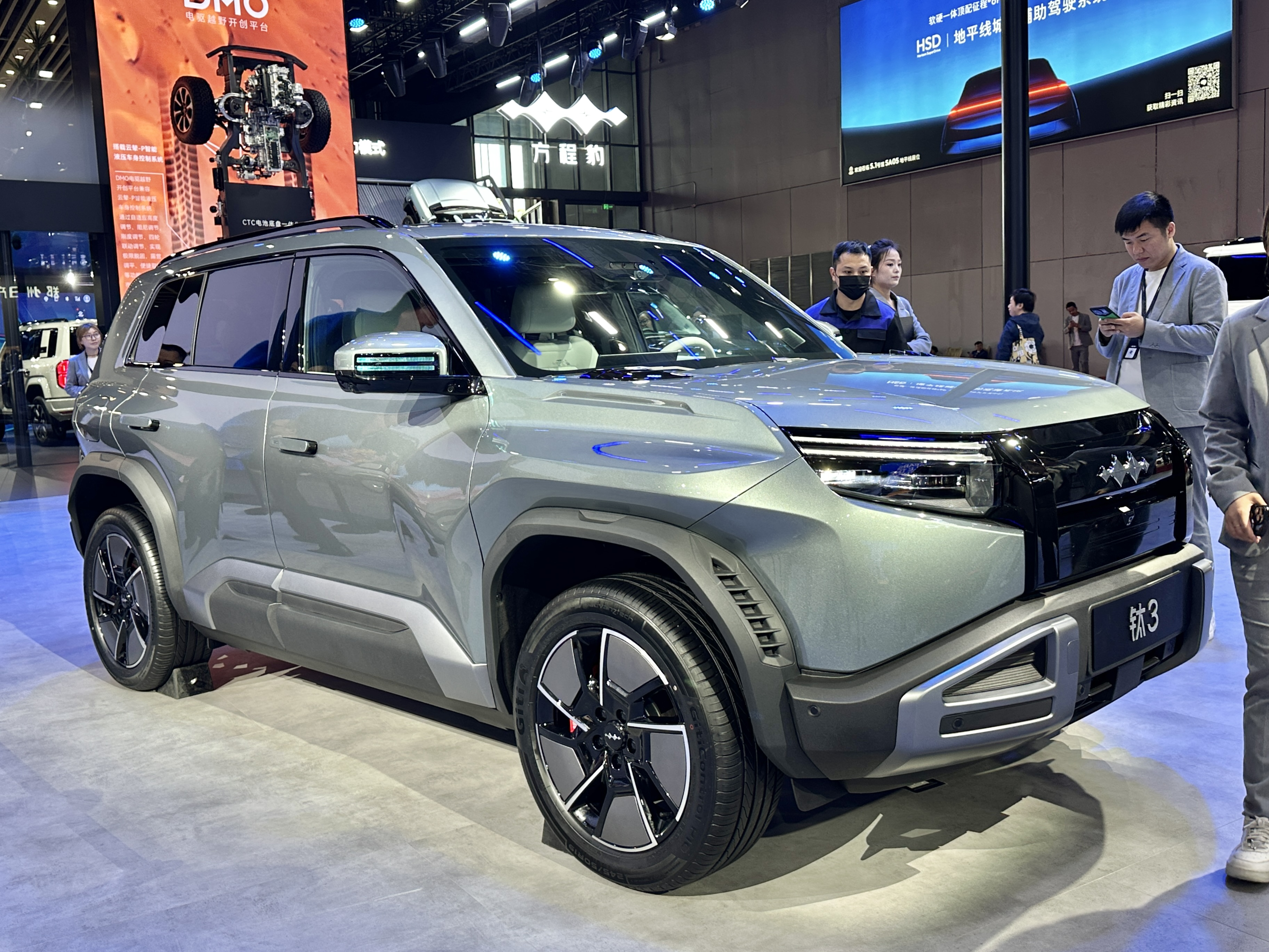
Fangchengbao Tai 3

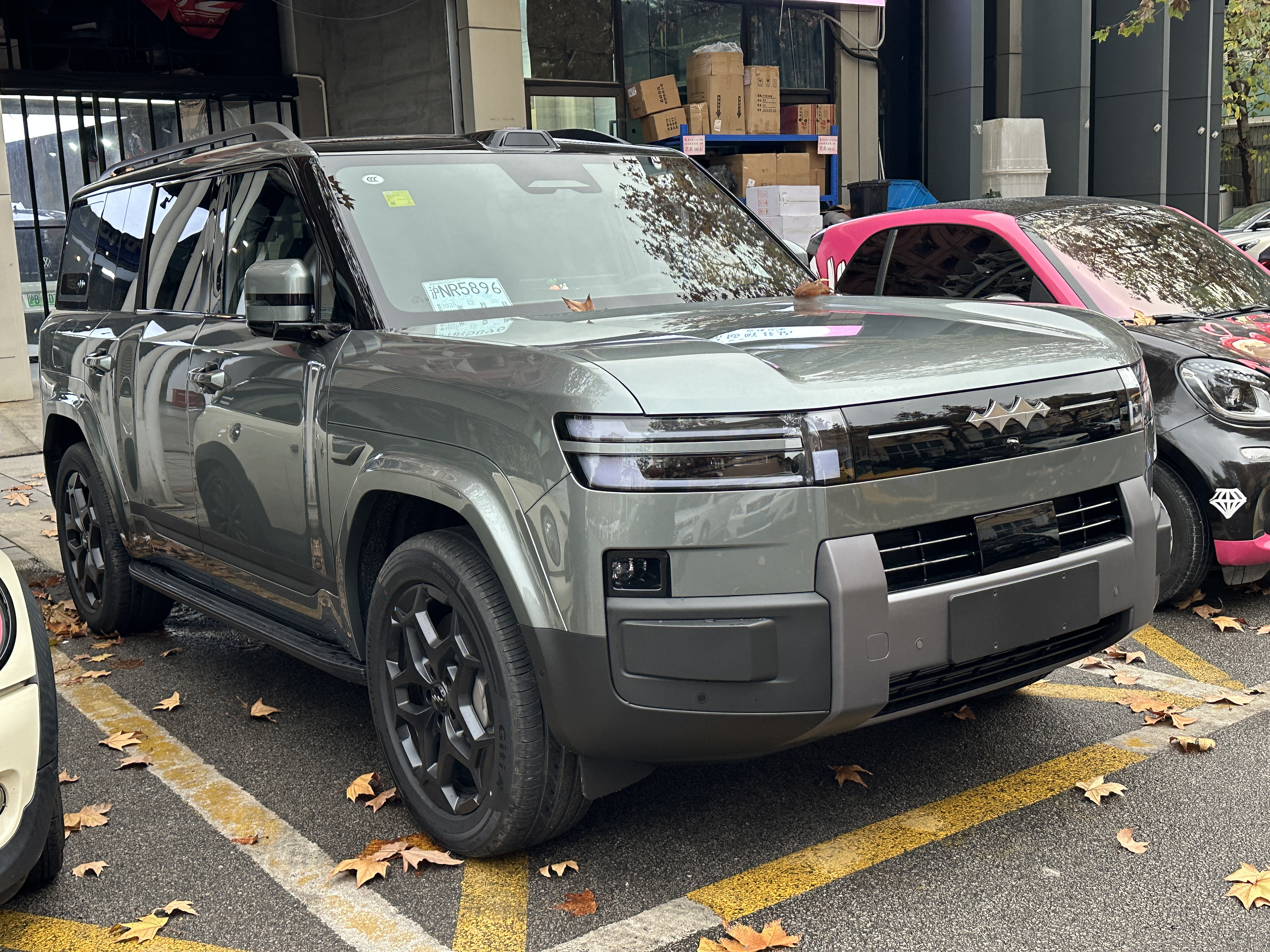
Fangchengbao Ti7

Fangchengbao Ti9

=== Formula Series ===
- Fangchengbao Formula S (2026–present), full-size sedan, BEV
- Fangchengbao Formula S GT (2026–present), full-size shooting brake, BEV
- Fangchengbao Formula SL (upcoming), full-size sedan, BEV
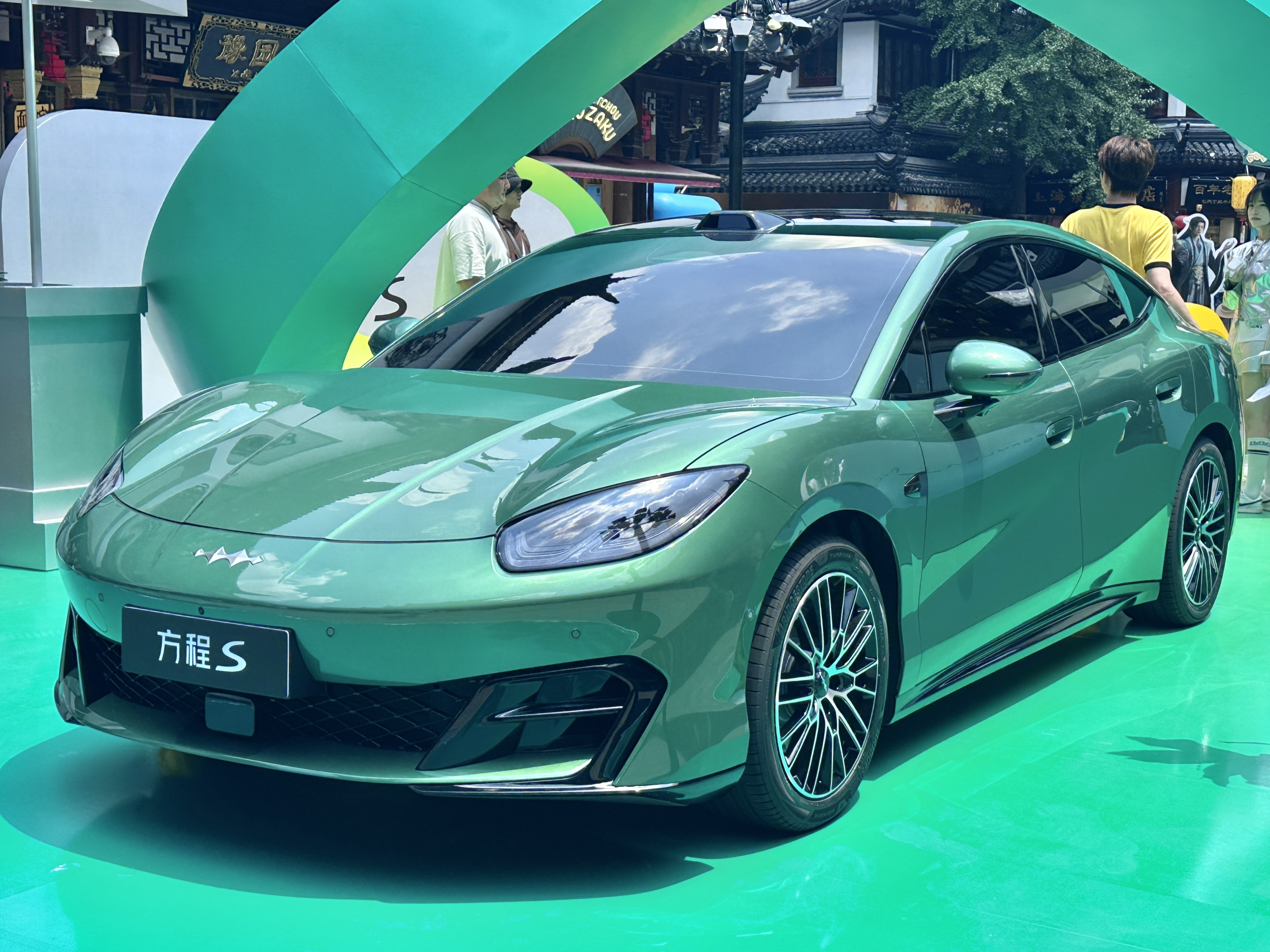
Fangchengbao Formula S

Fangchengbao Formula S GT

=== Other ===
- Fangchengbao Shark (upcoming), mid-size pickup truck, PHEV

=== Concept models ===
- Fangchengbao Super 3 concept, battery electric compact SUV with roof rack-mounted drone hangar, later developed into the production model Tai 3
- Fangchengbao Super 9 concept, battery electric supercar, later developed as the Denza Z
- Fangchengbao Formula X concept, battery electric supercar
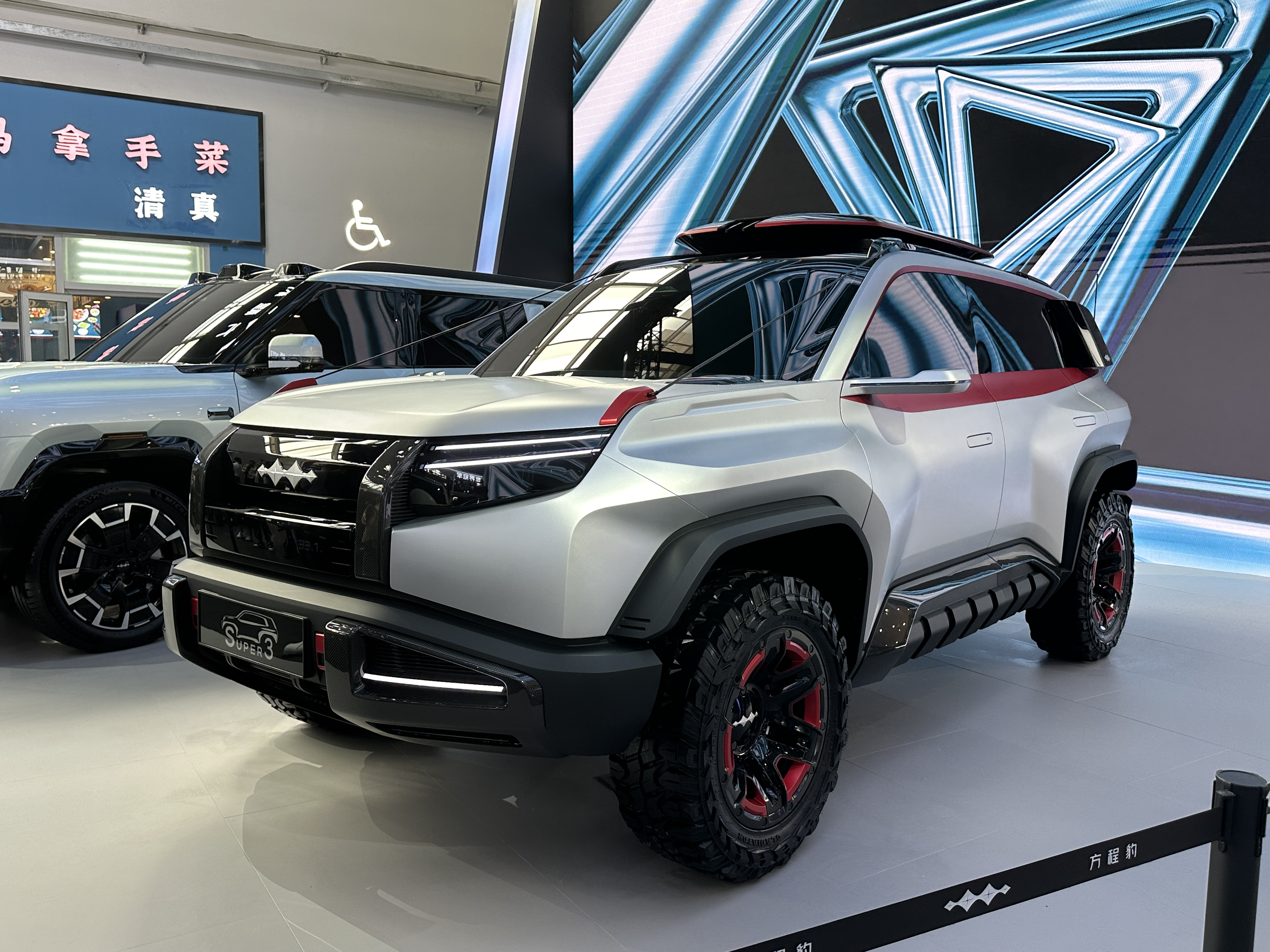
Fangchengbao Super 3

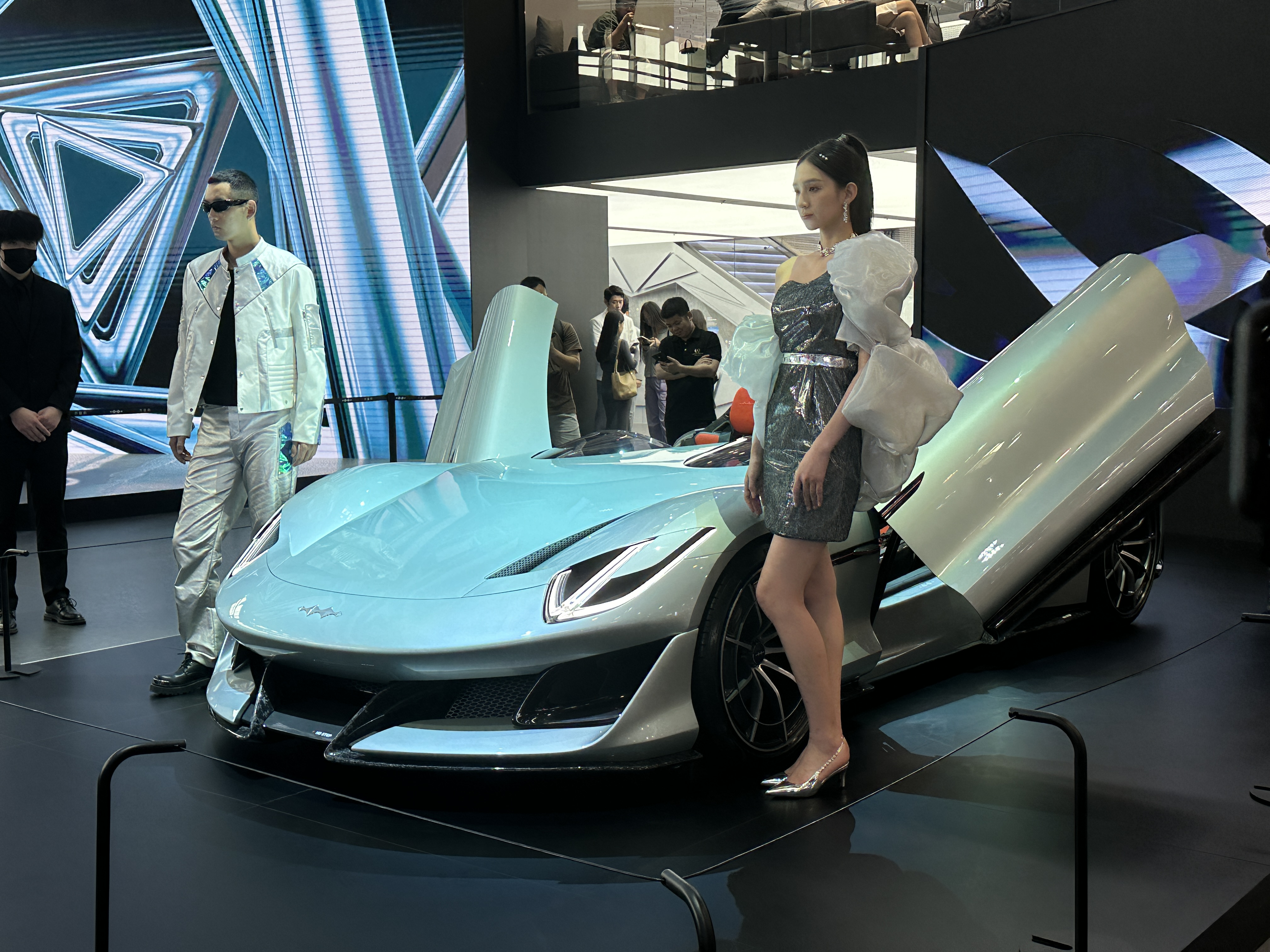
Fangchengbao Super 9

== See also ==
- BYD Auto
- List of BYD Auto vehicles
- Denza
- Yangwang
- Linghui
- Automobile manufacturers and brands of China
- List of automobile manufacturers of China
