= Nissan NX7 =

Range-extended mid-size crossover SUV

Overview
- Manufacturer: Nissan
- Production: 2026 (to commence)
- Assembly: China: Guangzhou (Dongfeng Nissan)

Body and chassis
- Class: Mid-size crossover SUV (D)
- Body style: 5-door SUV
- Layout: Front-engine, front-motor, front-wheel-drive
- Platform: Nissan AI Cloud Engine Hybrid architecture

Powertrain
- Engine: 1.5 L NR15 I4
- Electric motor: 170 kW Permanent Magnet Synchronous Motor (PMSM)
- Transmission: 13-in-1 DHT
- Hybrid drivetrain: Plug-in hybrid (PHEV)
- Battery: 40.95 kWh CATL-Nissan Yundun LFP
- Range: 1,666 km (1,035 mi)
- Electric range: 220–225 km (137–140 mi)

Dimensions
- Wheelbase: 2,815 mm (110.8 in)
- Length: 4,785 mm (188.4 in)
- Width: 1,920–1,932 mm (75.6–76.1 in)
- Height: 1,660 mm (65.4 in)
- Curb weight: 1,915–2,000 kg (4,222–4,409 lb)

The Nissan NX7 (Chinese: 日产NX7; pinyin: Rìchǎn NX7) is a plug-in hybrid mid-size crossover SUV produced by the Dongfeng Nissan joint venture and sold under the Nissan brand. Following the larger NX8, it is the second SUV in Nissan's China-exclusive N series vehicles.

== Overview ==
The NX7 was previewed by the Urban SUV PHEV Concept at the 2026 Beijing Auto Show. It was officially teased by Nissan on 6 August 2026, one day before officially unveiling its design.

Its exterior design features split headlights similar to other vehicles in the N series, faintly recalling the "V-motion" grille. The rear features a full-width taillight unit.

The NX7 pairs a 1.5-liter naturally aspirated inline-four engine codenamed "NR15", which produces 73 kW (98 hp) of power, with an electric motor producing 170 kW (230 hp). It uses a 40.95 kWh lithium iron phosphate (LFP) battery supplied by CATL, providing an electric-only CLTC range of 220–225 km (137–140 mi).
