= Denza Z =

Battery electric sports car

Overview
- Manufacturer: BYD Auto
- Model code: EXE
- Production: 2026–present
- Assembly: China: Shenzhen, Guangdong
- Designer: Under the lead of Wolfgang Egger

Body and chassis
- Class: Sports car (S)
- Body style: 2-door coupé; 2-door convertible
- Layout: Tri-motor, all-wheel-drive
- Platform: e^{3} Platform
- Related: Denza N8L; Denza N9; Denza Z9

Powertrain
- Electric motor: 3× permanent magnet synchronus motors (1× front and 2× rears)
- Power output: 1,000 hp (750 kW; 1,000 PS) (targeted); 1,180 kW (1,600 PS; 1,580 hp) (production)
- Battery: 76 kWh BYD Blade 2.0 LFP

Dimensions
- Wheelbase: 2,780 mm (109.4 in)
- Length: 4,780 mm (188.2 in); 4,870 mm (191.7 in) (Racing)
- Width: 1,990 mm (78.3 in)
- Height: 1,350 mm (53.1 in)
- Curb weight: 2,250 kg (4,960 lb); 2,230 kg (4,916 lb) (Racing)

The Denza Z (Chinese: 腾势Z; pinyin: Téngshì Z) is a battery electric sports car produced by BYD Auto and sold under its Denza marque since 2026.

== Denza Z Concept (2025) ==
During of the 2025 Shanghai Auto Show on 23 April 2025, the Denza presented the Z as a concept car. It is designed by Wolfgang Egger, the current head designer of the BYD group and former lead designer for Audi, Lamborghini, and Alfa Romeo. It shares design cues with the Fangchengbao Super 9 concept which preceded it, such as the headlights and double diamond taillights.

It has a large spoiler alongside a front splitter and rear diffuser. It will also have a roll cage. The mirrors are positioned on the doors, with integrated side-view cameras. The windows are frameless, with the door handles using a hidden design. The interior features a fold-away steering wheel that utilizes a steer-by-wire system.

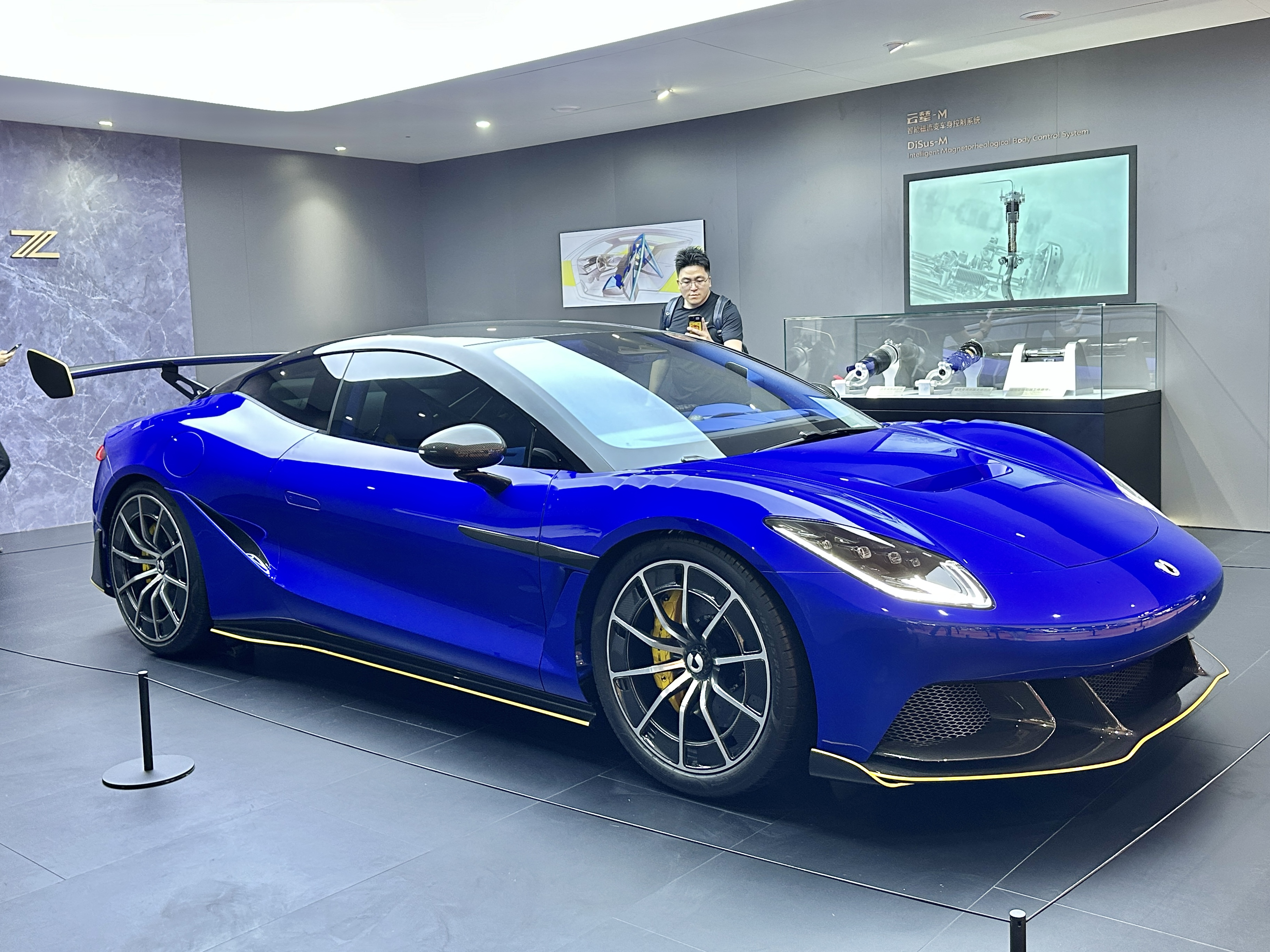
The Denza Z was previewed by the concept of the same name at the 2025 Shanghai Auto Show.

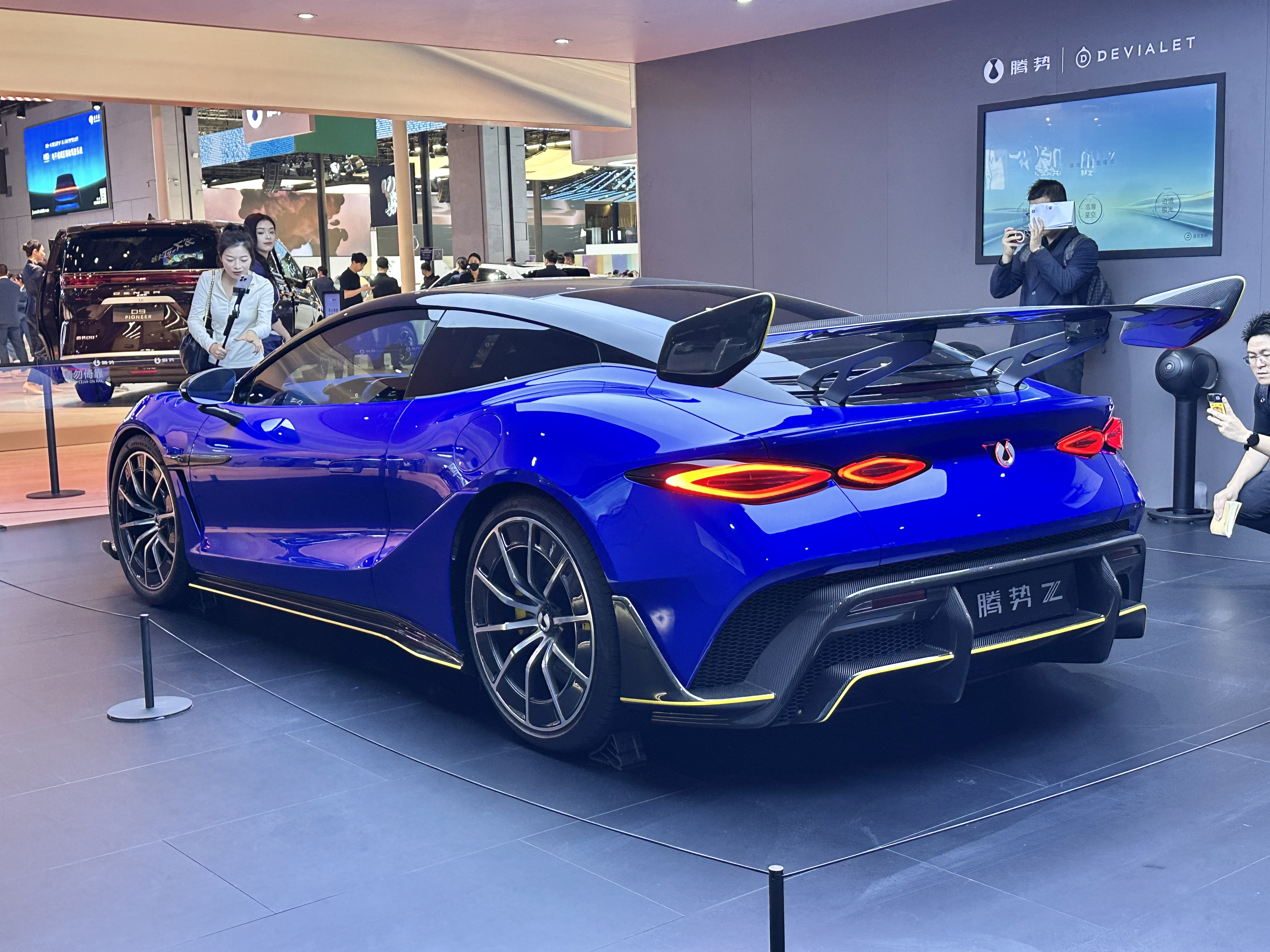
Rear view

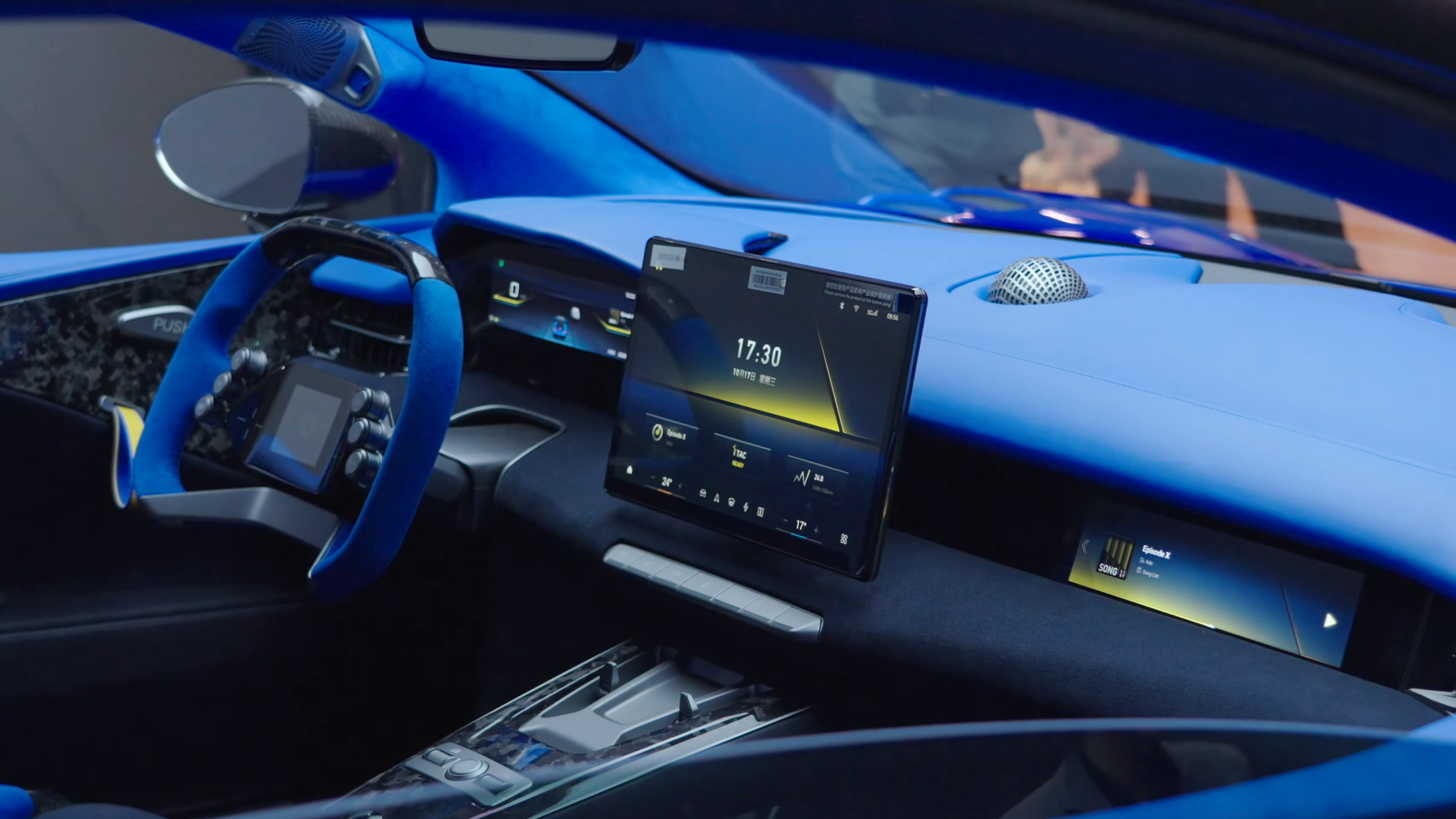
Interior

The first spyshots of the Z showed up on June 6, 2025. A prototype was also spotted with missing bodywork and foam on the body on the 16th of the same month.

In late June 2025, spyshots were released of a convertible version of the Z. This confirmed that the Z would also offer a convertible version.

On 22 October 2025, photos surfaced of a prototype Z being tested on the Nürburgring in Germany. The prototype used also had tires supplied by Giti Tire. The following month, it was confirmed that the United Kingdom would be the first country the Z would be exported to.

A naming contest for the Z opened on March 23, 2026. The contest is limited to submitting suffixes for the model, as the naming contest will be used to decide the names for the Z's three versions: hardtop coupe, convertible, and track versions.

The English actor Daniel Craig, who has played the character James Bond for 5 films in the franchise between 2006 and 2021, will be part of the marketing for the Z. It was announced in late March 2026. The Z will officially make its debut at the 2026 Goodwood Festival of Speed.

== Overview ==
The Z was officially unveiled at the 2026 Beijing Auto Show on 24 April 2026, first in "Spider" (convertible) form.

Rear view

Interior

=== Design ===
The Z retains the exterior design of the 2025 Z Concept with several minor redesigned elements. The headlights and "double diamond" taillights have been largely carried over. The front fascia also features large air intakes. Its cabin becomes narrower from the B-pillar onwards. Flush door handles are also utilized, though they are mechanical and do not pop out to comply with the latest Chinese safety standards.

== Powertrain and chassis ==
There is no specific power output confirmed for the Z. It is rumored to produce at least 1,000 horsepower (750 kW; 1,000 PS), and it also shares the e^{3} (YiSanFang) platform with the Denza Z9. however it was also said to use the same electric motors as the Tang L and the Han L, meaning the power output is expected to be no less than 778 horsepower (580 kW; 789 PS). At some point it was also expected to produce 536 horsepower (400 kW; 543 PS) and use a dual-motor layout.

The front suspension uses a double wishbone setup. It will also debut BYD's Disus-M body control system.
