= Epicland X9 =

Battery electric and range-extended full-size luxury SUV

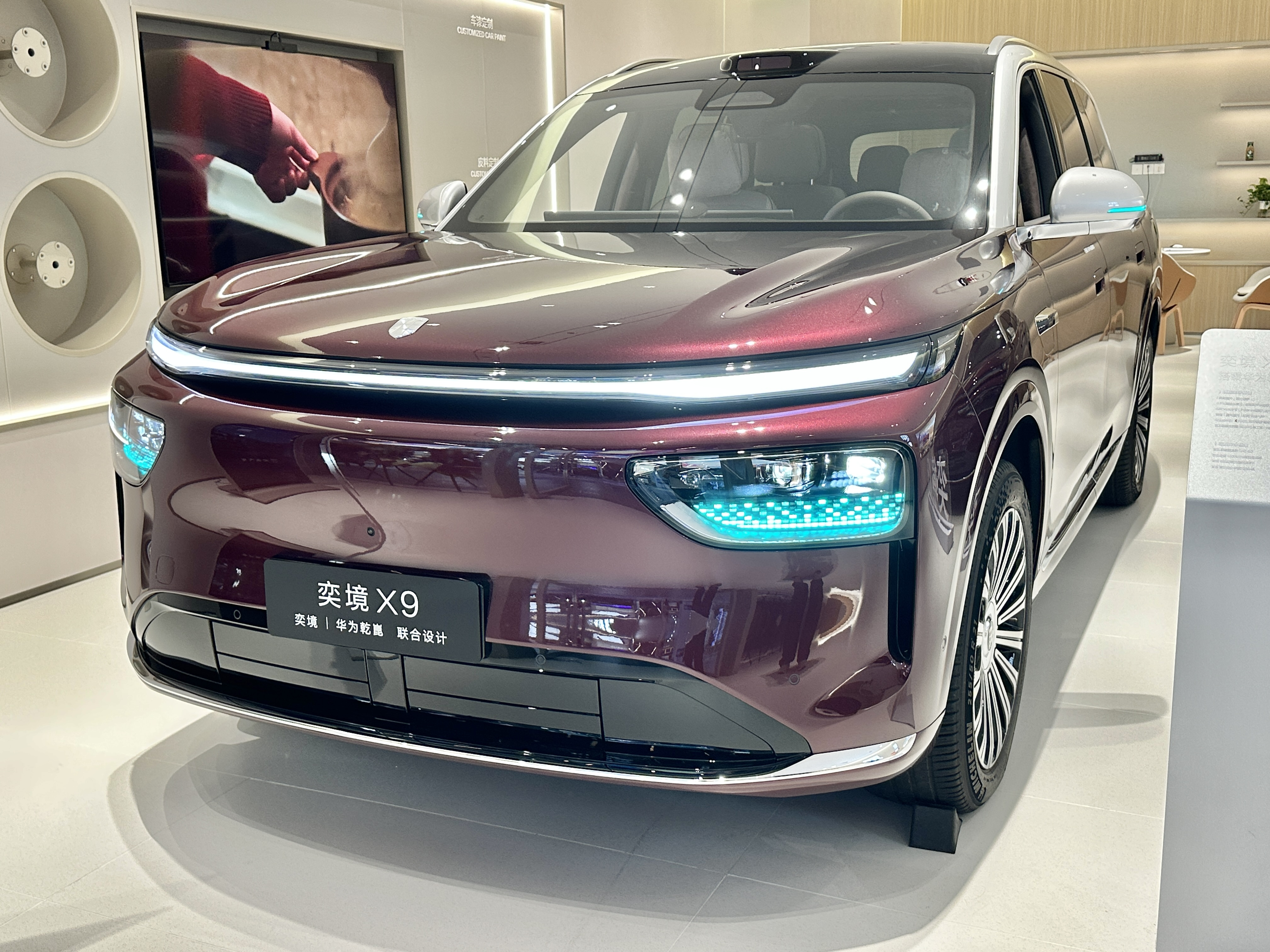

Overview
- Manufacturer: Epicland
- Production: July 2026 – present
- Assembly: China: Chengdu

Body and chassis
- Class: Full-size luxury SUV (F)
- Body style: 5-door SUV
- Layout: Front-engine, rear-motor, rear-wheel-drive; Front-engine, dual-motor, four-wheel-drive

Powertrain
- Engine: Gasoline range extender: 1.5 L DFMC15TPE turbo I4
- Hybrid drivetrain: Series (EREV); Single motor Rear-wheel drive Battery electric vehicle (BEV); Dual motor All-wheel drive Battery electric vehicle (BEV)
- Battery: 51.46 kWh LFP CATL; 74.29 kWh LFP CATL
- Range: 1,270–1,410 km (789–876 mi) (WLTP)
- Electric range: 217–350 km (135–217 mi) (WLTP); 280–465 km (174–289 mi) (CLTC)
- Plug-in charging: 20–80%: 18 minutes (DC)

Dimensions
- Wheelbase: 3,120 mm (122.8 in)
- Length: 5,301 mm (208.7 in)
- Width: 2,000 mm (78.7 in)
- Height: 2,015 mm (79.3 in)
- Curb weight: 2,770–2,962 kg (6,107–6,530 lb)

The Epicland X9 (Chinese: 奕境X9; pinyin: Yìjìng X9) is a battery electric and range-extended full-size luxury SUV produced by the Dongfeng Motor Corporation and sold under the Epicland marque created in collaboration with Huawei.

== Overview ==
On November 20, 2025, the Huawei announced two new car brands under its Qiankun ecosystem in partnership with the GAC Group and the Dongfeng Motor Corporation, being Qijing, which later became Aistaland, and Yijing, which later became Epicland. The announcement was made just before the 2025 Guangzhou Auto Show.

The first prototype rolled off the assembly line on December 22, 2025.

The first spyshots of the X9 appeared on January 18, 2026. Winter testing took place in Mohe City and Hulunbuir and concluded on January 23, 2026. The first official images were also shown around the same time.

The official name was revealed to be the X9 on April 20, 2026. It is reported that the English name of Yijing would be Epicland as the trademark for the name was previously applied with the China National Intellectual Property Administration. It made its debut at the Huawei Automotive Technology Conference on April 23, 2026. It was publicly unveiled at the Beijing Auto Show on April 26, 2026.

Pre-sales opened on August 18, 2026, with a starting price of ¥299,800 ($41,100).

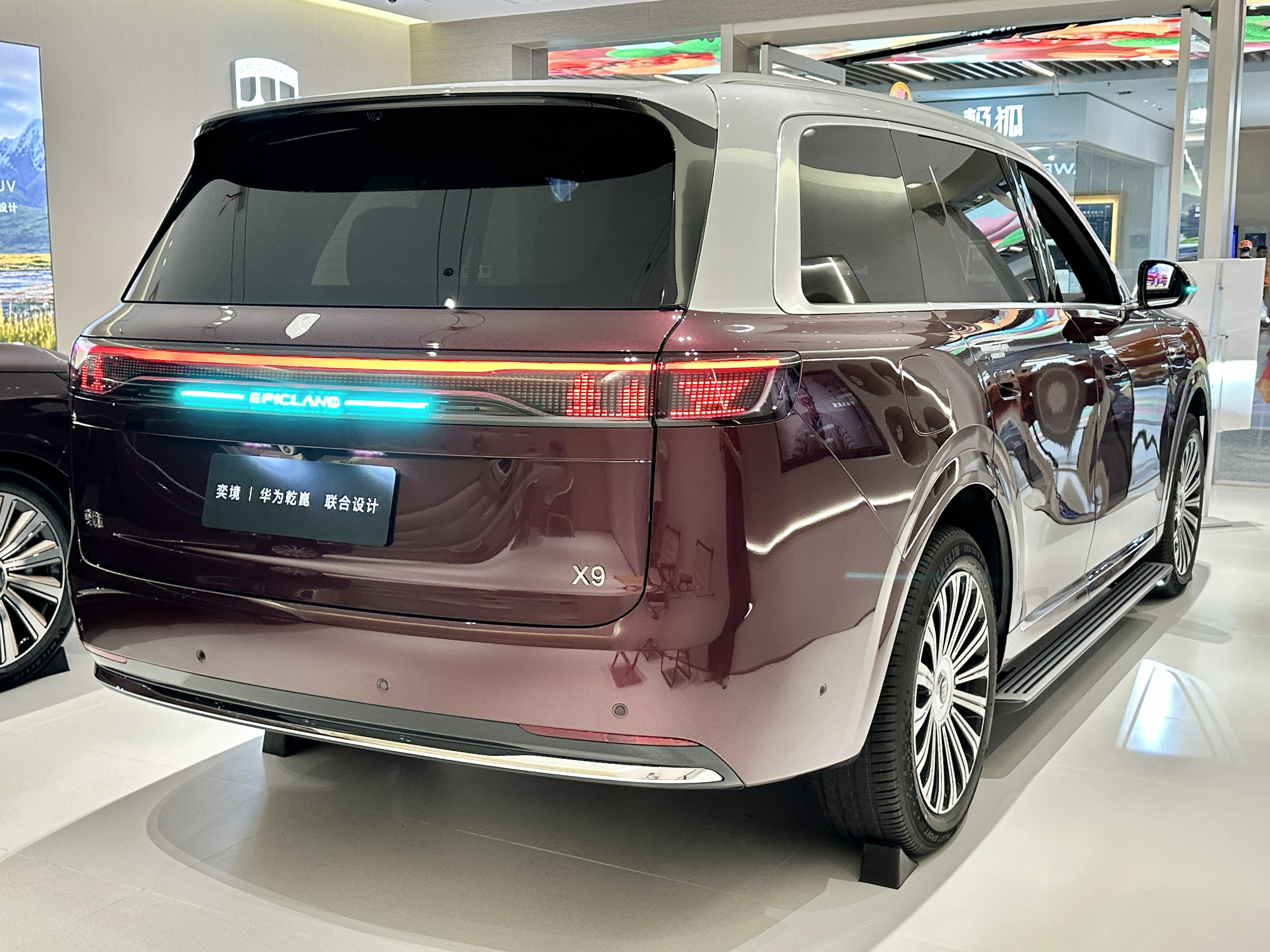
Rear view

Interior

=== Design ===
The X9 uses a split headlight setup, with a daytime running light strip placed above the headlights. It uses a flat roof line with a high belt line, stretched rear doors, and slanted D-pillars. The design of the taillights are expected to mirror that of the headlights.

=== Features ===
The X9 will adopt Huawei's Qiankun ADS 4.1 advanced driver-assistance system and HarmonyOS for its infotainment system. It will also use Huawei's 896-line LiDAR sensor. Compared to previous cars that utilized Huawei's technology, the X9 will have Huawei's technology fully integrated.

It is also the first vehicle co-developed with Huawei to offer the brand's latest full-stack technology.

The interior uses dual 17-inch 3.4K central touchscreens that can operate independently and also come with an eye protection mode. The light bar at the rear measures 72.05 inches (1,830.1 mm) and has 1,172 individual light beads.

== Powertrain and chassis ==
The X9 would be offered as a range-extended EV at launch, with a battery electric version being added later.

The X9 was first offered as a range-extended EV. It uses a 1.5 liter turbocharged inline 4 gasoline engine codenamed DFMC15TPE producing 127 horsepower (95 kW; 129 PS) as a generator. All-wheel-drive models produce 563 horsepower (420 kW; 571 PS), with no power figure available for the rear-wheel-drive model. The X9 comes with two battery options: a 51.46 kWh battery and a 74.3 kWh battery, with the 74.29 kWh battery being a lithium iron phosphate battery courtesy of CATL. The 51.46 kWh battery gets a range of 217 kilometres (135 mi) in all-wheel-drive models, with the rear-wheel-drive version getting 229 kilometres (142 mi) when equipped with the same battery. Models equipped with the 74.29 kWh battery get a range of up to 465 kilometres (289 mi).

The battery electric variant was introduced during the 2026 Guangzhou Auto Show in the fourth quarter of 2026. The single motor variant produces 300kW, while the duo motor variant has a front and rear motor producing 150kW and 300kW respectively resulting in a combined output of 450kW.

Specifications
Battery		Motor		Power	Torque	Electric range		20–80% charge	0–100 km/h (62 mph)	Top speed	Kerb weight
Type	Weight	Front	Rear	Power	Torque	WLTP	CLTC	20–80% charge	0–100 km/h (62 mph)	Top speed	Kerb weight
51.46 kWh LFP CATL	360 kg (794 lb)	135 kW DY42YS225135 induction	215 kW TZ225XYH02 PMSM	469 hp (350 kW; 476 PS)	640 N⋅m (472 lb⋅ft)	217 km (135 mi)	280 km (174 mi)	18 min	5.3 s	190 km/h (118 mph)	2,770 kg (6,107 lb)
74.29 kWh LFP CATL	505 kg (1,113 lb)	—	300 kW YY70TZ225001 PMSM	402 hp (300 kW; 408 PS)	400 N⋅m (295 lb⋅ft)	350 km (217 mi)	465 km (289 mi)	18 min	7.8 s	200 km/h (124 mph)	2,795 kg (6,162 lb)
74.29 kWh LFP CATL	505 kg (1,113 lb)	150 kW DY42YS225135 induction	300 kW YY70TZ225001 PMSM	603 hp (450 kW; 611 PS)	700 N⋅m (516 lb⋅ft)	326 km (203 mi)	432 km (268 mi)	18 min	4.8 s	200 km/h (124 mph)	2,912–2,962 kg (6,420–6,530 lb)

== Sales ==
The X9 received 21,000 pre-orders in 24 hours after pre-sales opened on August 19, 2026. Since deliveries began on 18 October 2026, 3,612 X9s were delivered in the month of October 2026.

== Collision investigation ==
On October 28, 2026, footage appeared online of an X9 lit on fire on a highway in Taizhou, Zhejiang. Later in the same day, Zeng Qinglin, Epicland's General Manager, responded on Weibo that the fire was by a speeding dump truck rear-ending the X9 while at a complete stop. After the incident, Epicland was able to contact the X9's owner through its E-Call system. A later investigation revealed that the fire began from the X9's fuel system. None of the 3 passengers were injured in the accident.

Epicland gained attention after revealing the battery remained intact. No-fire batteries were made mandatory in July 2026.
