= GT7 =

GT7 may refer to:

- Gran Turismo 7, a racing video game, which referred to as GT7
- Aistaland GT7 or Qijing GT7, a shooting brake by GAC and Huawei
- Denel GT-7, a South African tank cannon
