= Aistaland GX7 =

Range extender mid-size crossover SUV

Overview
- Manufacturer: Aistaland
- Production: September 2026 – present
- Assembly: China: Guangzhou (GAC Aion)

Body and chassis
- Class: Mid-size crossover SUV (D)
- Body style: 5-door SUV
- Layout: Rear-motor, rear-wheel-drive; Dual-motor, all-wheel-drive; Front-engine, tri-motor, all-wheel-drive
- Related: Aistaland GT7

Powertrain
- Engine: Petrol range extender: 1.5 L 4A15J4 turbo I4
- Hybrid drivetrain: Series range-extender
- Battery: 51.898 kWh Freevoy LFP CATL; 67.1584 kWh Freevoy NMC CATL
- Electric range: 260–305 km (162–190 mi) (WLTP); 325–285 km (202–177 mi) (CLTC)

Dimensions
- Wheelbase: 3,070 mm (120.9 in)
- Length: 5,099 mm (200.7 in)
- Width: 2,006 mm (79.0 in)
- Height: 1,750 mm (68.9 in)
- Curb weight: 2,488–2,720 kg (5,485–5,997 lb)

The Aistaland GX7 (Chinese: 启境GX7; pinyin: Qǐjìng GX7) is a range-extended mid-size crossover SUV produced by GAC Group under its Aistaland marque. It is the second model under the Aistaland brand, which is co-developed by GAC Group and Huawei.

== Overview ==
The GX7 was first revealed on 26 June 2026 at the launch event for the Aistaland GT7. It was launched with pre-orders opening on 4 September 2026, with deliveries expected to begin within 2026.

The GX7 is a mid-size 2-row 5-seater crossover SUV. It is equipped with several Huawei technologies.

Aistaland says that 90.3% of the chassis consists of high strength steel and aluminium alloy, with 2200MPa reinforcement beams and door rings formed by a single large casting. It has continuous damping control as standard and optional dual-chamber air suspension. It is equipped with Continental four-piston brake calipers as standard. It uses the Huawei XMC digital chassis system, which integrates steering, braking, powertrain control, suspension control, powertrain thermal management, and stability control into a unified interconnected system.

The GX7 has soft-close doors and a heat pump HVAC system supporting standard 3-zone climate control.

The interior features an 8.8-inch digital instrument cluster supplemented by a 88-inch AR-HUD and the dashboard contains a 15.6-inch central infotainment touchscreen paired with a 15.6-inch passenger entertainment display, all running Huawei's HarmonySpace 6 operating system. The center console contains a 10-litre (0.35 cu ft) refrigerator with a temperature range of −6–50 °C (21–122 °F).

The GX7 features a unique one-touch bed mode, which can fold the second row seats and legrests into a fully flat 2.65 m (8 ft 8 in) continuous surface within 20 seconds. This is achieved by using a multilink seat bottom lift mechanism, legrests integrated into the seat bottom with a continuous piece of upholstery, side bolsters fixed to the vehicle's pillars rather than the reclining seatback, and a full-width headrest. With the front row headrests removed, the front row seats can also fold flat and can accommodate a large inflatable mattress accessory stretching from the dashboard to the rear hatch. All seats have heating, cooling, massaging, and 'zero-gravity' recline functions, including when the seats are configured in bed mode.

The GX7 is equipped with a Huawei XSCENE 2K-resolution laser projector with a 2000:1 contrast ratio and 98% DCI-P3 color gamut coverage. It can project onto a 32-inch ceiling-mounted screen located behind the front row or a 46-inch screen hanging from the opened tailgate. Additionally, the Huawei XPIXEL headlights are capable of projecting images with a resolution of 1 megapixel.

The GX7 has 896 L (31.6 cu ft) of space in the rear cargo area supplemented by a 138-litre (4.9 cu ft) underfloor storage area, which expands to 2,155 L (76.1 cu ft) with the rear seats folded down.

The GX7 is equipped with the Huawei Qiankun ADS 5 ADAS system, which has a sensor suite consisting of one roof-mounted 896-line long-range LiDAR, three solid-state wide-angle LiDARs, 5 mmWave radars, 11 cameras, and 12 ultrasonic sensors, and is capable of urban and highway L2 assisted driving.

Rear view

Interior

== Powertrain ==
The GX7 is available exclusively with a range extender powertrain.

It uses a 1.5-liter turbocharged direct-injected inline-4 petrol engine outputting 161 hp (120 kW; 163 PS) (167 hp (125 kW; 169 PS) gross) at 5,500 rpm and 245 N⋅m (181 lb⋅ft) of torque from 2,500–4,000 rpm.

The standard single-motor variant uses a 268 hp (200 kW; 272 PS) rear motor paired with a 51.898 kWh LFP CATL Freevoy battery which provides 270 kilometres (168 mi) of WLTP electric range. It uses 400-volt class power electronics and can recharge from 30–80% in 15 minutes. The dual-motor all-wheel drive variant adds a 188 hp (140 kW; 191 PS) front motor for a total of 456 hp (340 kW; 462 PS) and has a 260 kilometres (162 mi) WLTP electric range rating using the same battery.

The triple-motor all-wheel drive variant uses a 201 hp (150 kW; 204 PS) front axle motor and individual 268 hp (200 kW; 272 PS) motors for each rear wheel for a total of 737 hp (550 kW; 747 PS). It is paired with a 67.1584 kWh NMC CATL Freevoy battery which provides 305 kilometres (190 mi) of WLTP electric range can recharge from 30–80% in 10 minutes with its 800-volt class power electronics.

Specifications
Battery		Motor		Power			Torque			Electric range		30–80% time	0–100 km/h (62 mph)	Top speed	Kerb weight
Type	Weight	Front	Rear	Front	Rear	Total	Front	Rear	Total	WLTP	CLTC	30–80% time	0–100 km/h (62 mph)	Top speed	Kerb weight
52 kWh LFP Freevoy CATL	358 kg (789 lb)	—	QT41TZ210C02 PMSM	—	268 hp (200 kW; 272 PS)	268 hp (200 kW; 272 PS)	—	320 N⋅m (236 lb⋅ft)	320 N⋅m (236 lb⋅ft)	270 km (168 mi)	340 km (211 mi)	15 min	7.6 s	210 km/h (130 mph)	2,488 kg (5,485 lb)
52 kWh LFP Freevoy CATL	358 kg (789 lb)	YS210XYYG31 induction	QT41TZ210C02 PMSM	188 hp (140 kW; 191 PS)	268 hp (200 kW; 272 PS)	456 hp (340 kW; 462 PS)	230 N⋅m (170 lb⋅ft)	320 N⋅m (236 lb⋅ft)	550 N⋅m (406 lb⋅ft)	260 km (162 mi)	325 km (202 mi)	15 min	4.9 s	210 km/h (130 mph)	2,599 kg (5,730 lb)
67 kWh NMC Freevoy CATL	400 kg (882 lb)	YS210XYYG34 induction	2×TZ220XYF031 PMSM	201 hp (150 kW; 204 PS)	536 hp (400 kW; 543 PS)	737 hp (550 kW; 747 PS)	230 N⋅m (170 lb⋅ft)	624 N⋅m (460 lb⋅ft)	854 N⋅m (630 lb⋅ft)	305 km (190 mi)	385 km (239 mi)	10 min	3.9 s	210 km/h (130 mph)	2,720 kg (5,997 lb)

== Sales ==
Within 18 hours of its launch on 4 September 2026, the GX7 received over 20,000 pre-orders.
