= Audi Shooting Brake =

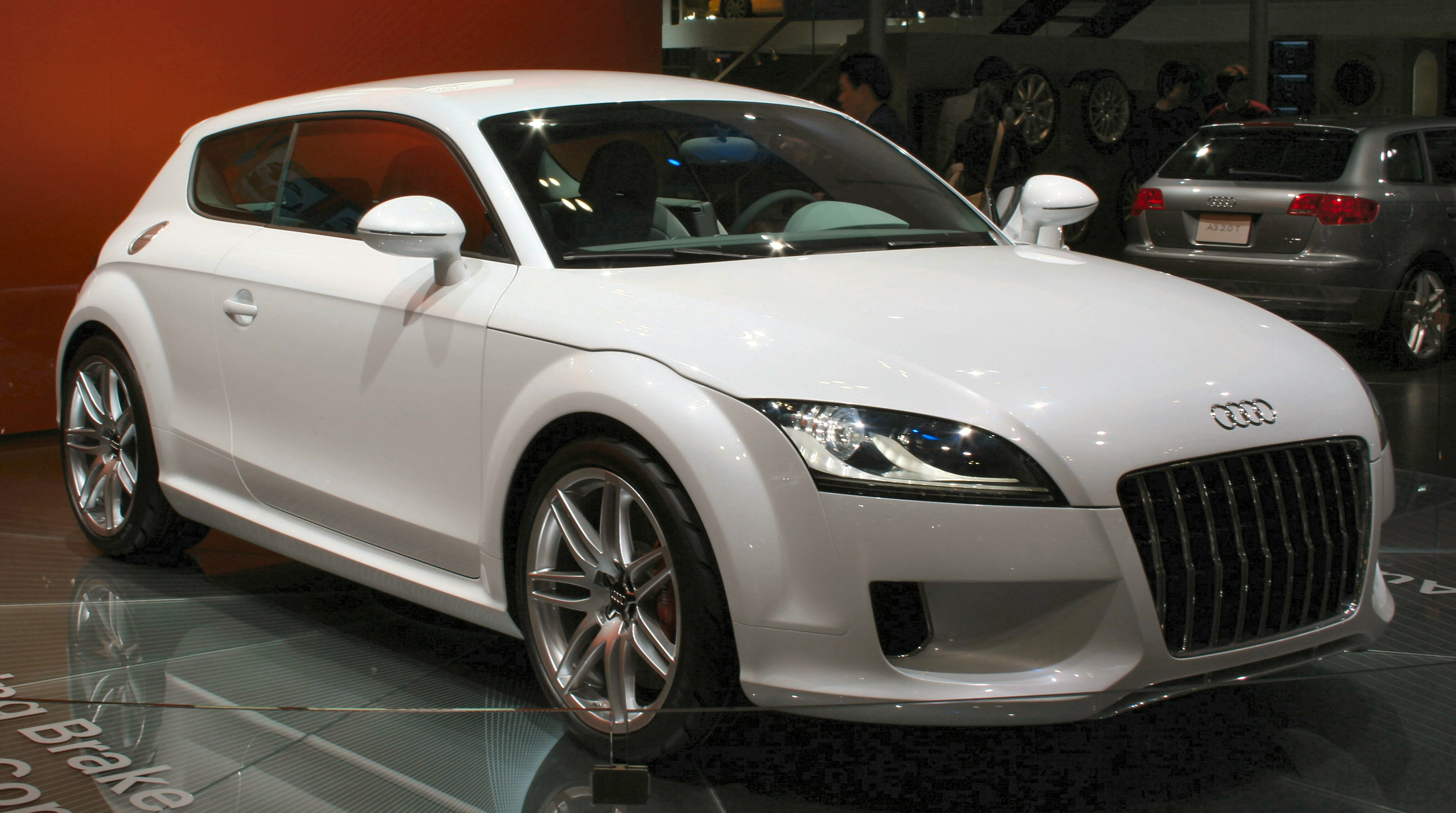
- Audi Shooting Brake at the 2005 Tokyo Motor Show

Overview
- Manufacturer: Audi AG
- Also called: Audi TT Shooting Brake
- Production: 2005

Body and chassis
- Class: Concept car
- Body style: 2-door compact hatchback
- Layout: Front engine, quattro on-demand four-wheel drive
- Platform: A5 (PQ35)

Powertrain
- Engine: 3.2 L VR6

The Audi Shooting Brake was a concept car developed by Audi and officially unveiled at the 2005 Tokyo Motor Show. It was a study of a sporty two-door compact shooting brake hatchback.

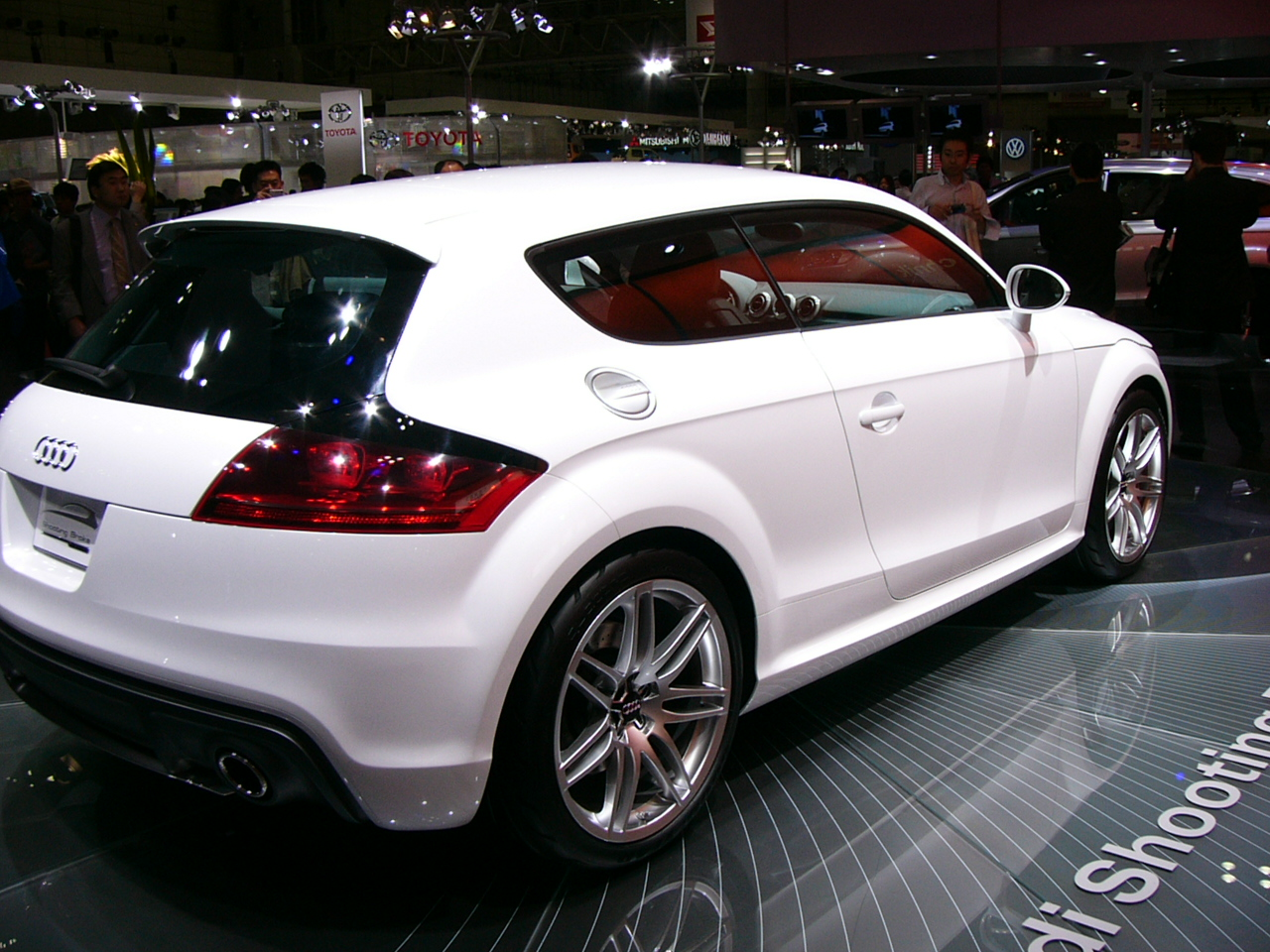
Rear view

The concept vehicle was based on the second-generation Audi TT and provided, to some extent, a preview of the new TT, which was yet to be launched. It was powered by a 3.2 litre VR6 engine, developing a maximum output of 250 PS (184 kW; 247 hp) at 6200 rpm, with torque peaking at 35.0 kg⋅m (343 N⋅m; 253 lb⋅ft) between 2500 and 3000 rpm. The engine, already in some of the Audi's production models, such as the second generation Audi A3, and the Audi TT sports car, accelerated the Shooting Brake from 0 to 100 km/h (0–62 mph) in 6 seconds, reaching an electronically limited top speed of 250 km/h (155 mph). The vehicle also had Audi's quattro four wheel drive system.

The exterior appearance was dominated by a massive single frame front grille, characteristic to the newest Audi models, as well as clear-glass headlights with new LED technology and 19-inch double-spoke wheels from quattro GmbH. The interior put the emphasis on sporty design and is dominated by materials like aluminium and leather. A notable interior feature was an evolutionary version of navigation system with touch screen monitor and character recognition.

In 2007, an Audi executive said that the car would not be produced.
