= Aistaland GT7 =

Full-size shooting brake

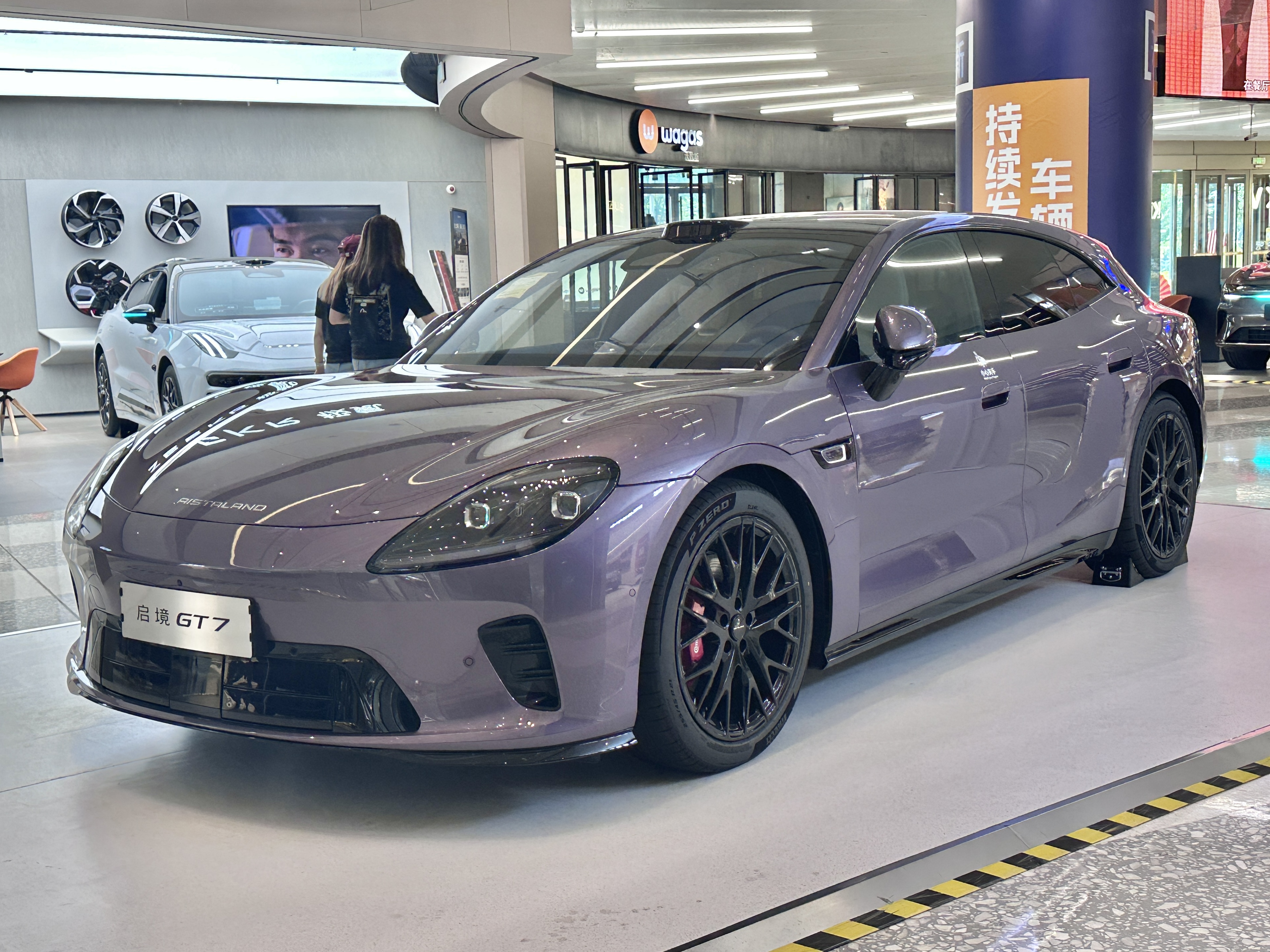

Overview
- Manufacturer: Aistaland
- Model code: F03
- Production: June 2026 – present
- Assembly: China: Guangzhou (GAC Aion)

Body and chassis
- Class: Full-size car (E)
- Body style: 5-door shooting brake
- Layout: Rear-motor, rear-wheel-drive (EV); Tri-motor, all-wheel-drive (EV); Front-engine, rear-motor, rear-wheel-drive (EREV); Front-engine, tri-motor, all-wheel-drive (EREV)
- Related: Aistaland GX7

Powertrain
- Engine: Petrol range extender: 1.5 L 4A15J4 turbo I4
- Power output: 250–565 kW (340–768 PS; 335–758 hp)
- Hybrid drivetrain: Series range-extender (EREV)
- Battery: 35.701 kWh Xiaoyao LFP CATL; 86.111 kWh Shenxing LFP CATL; 102.768 kWh Qilin NMC CATL
- Range: 1,300 km (808 mi) (EREV, CLTC)
- Electric range: 670–900 km (416–559 mi) (EV, CLTC); 205 km (127 mi) (EREV, WLTP); 252 km (157 mi) (EREV, CLTC)
- Plug-in charging: DC: 333–613 kW (EV)

Dimensions
- Wheelbase: 3,000 mm (118.1 in)
- Length: 5,050 mm (198.8 in)
- Width: 1,980 mm (78.0 in)
- Height: 1,470 mm (57.9 in)
- Curb weight: 2,230–2,450 kg (4,916–5,401 lb)

The Aistaland GT7 (Chinese: 启境GT7; pinyin: Qǐjìng GT7) is a battery electric and range-extended full-size shooting brake produced by GAC Group under its Aistaland marque. It is the first model under the Aistaland brand, which is co-developed by GAC Group and Huawei.

== History ==
The Aistaland marque was announced on September 19, 2025, marking GAC's intensified entry into China's premium electric vehicle market. Unlike Huawei's other automotive partnerships, Aistaland is not part of the Harmony Intelligent Mobility Alliance (HIMA). Former GAC executive Liu Jiaming was appointed as chief executive of the new brand on September 25, 2025.

On January 30, 2026, the first images of a camouflaged prototype were released. On March 8, 2026, the vehicle was named the Qijing GT7. The GT7 was officially unveiled on March 17, 2026, alongside the English name of the marque, Aistaland, which is derived from the phrase "AI Start New Land". Blind orders opened on the same day.

The GT7 was displayed at the 2026 Beijing Auto Show in April 2026. The interior was unveiled in mid-May 2026, and pre-sales opened on May 29, 2026, attracting over 10,000 orders within the first five hours. The GT7 was officially launched on June 26, 2026, with deliveries commencing in July 2026.

It has a double wishbone front and H-arm multi-link independent rear suspension geometries, and is equipped with dual-chamber air suspension.

=== Design ===
The GT7 adopts a low-slung, wide-body shooting brake silhouette with 14 aerodynamic enhancements, including active grille shutters and a clamshell aluminium hood. The front fascia uses a closed grille design with slim, elongated LED headlights and Huawei's XPixel smart projection headlights, capable of projecting a 120-inch image. Streamlined semi-concealed door handles are integrated into the body. The rear features a full-width LED light bar.

The interior is available in three colour schemes: Daybreak Red, Starry Night Black, and Moonlight Beige. Display systems include a full LCD instrument cluster, a 15.6-inch central touchscreen, and an augmented reality head-up display with an 88-inch projection area. The steering wheel is a three-spoke unit with dedicated buttons for intelligent driving modes. A 21-speaker Huawei Sound 7.1.4 audio system is fitted. It has 647 litres (22.8 cu ft) of rear cargo space which expands to 1,606 litres (56.7 cu ft) with the rear seats folded down, and the electric version features a 215-litre (7.6 cu ft) frunk.

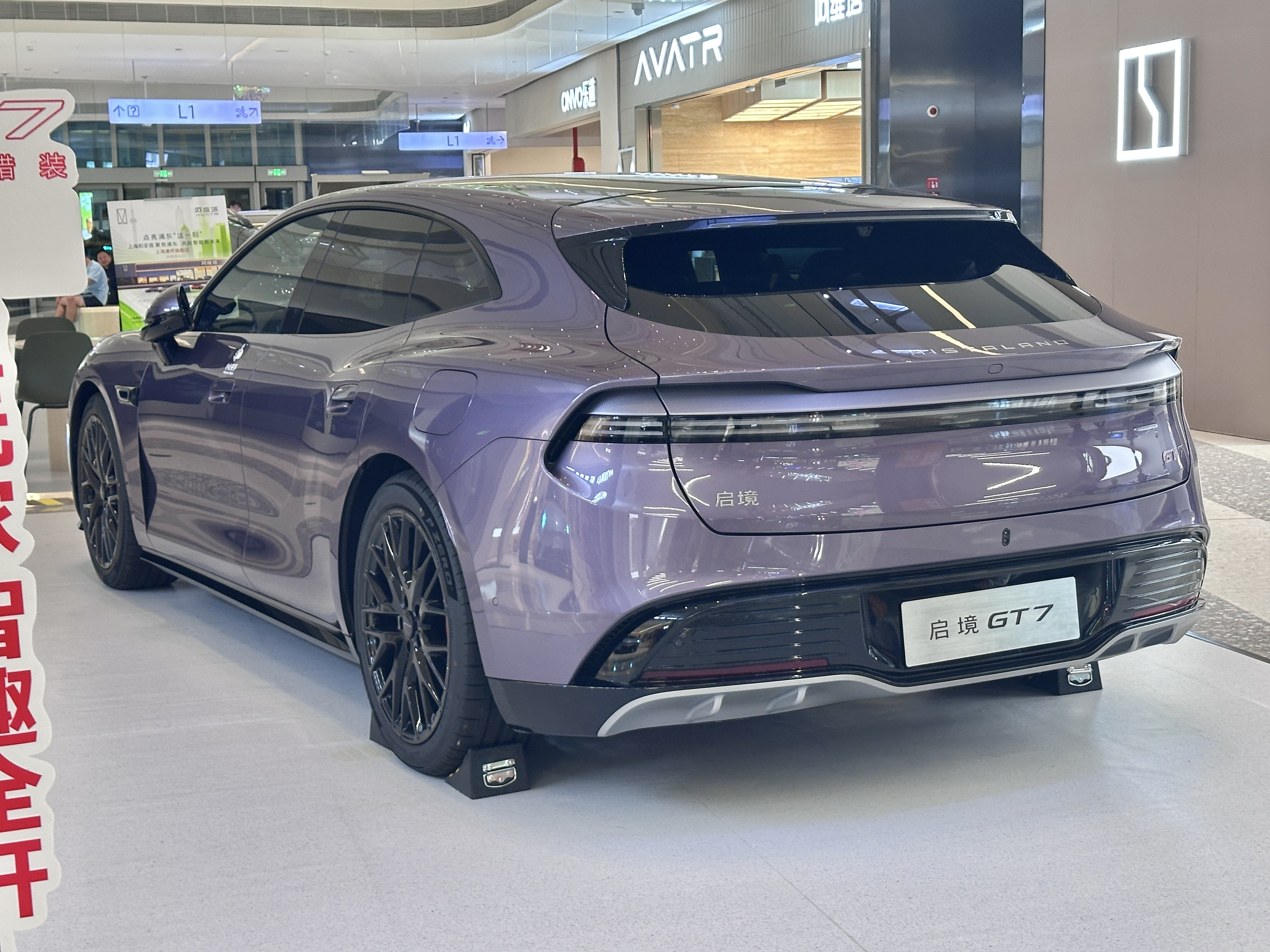
Rear view

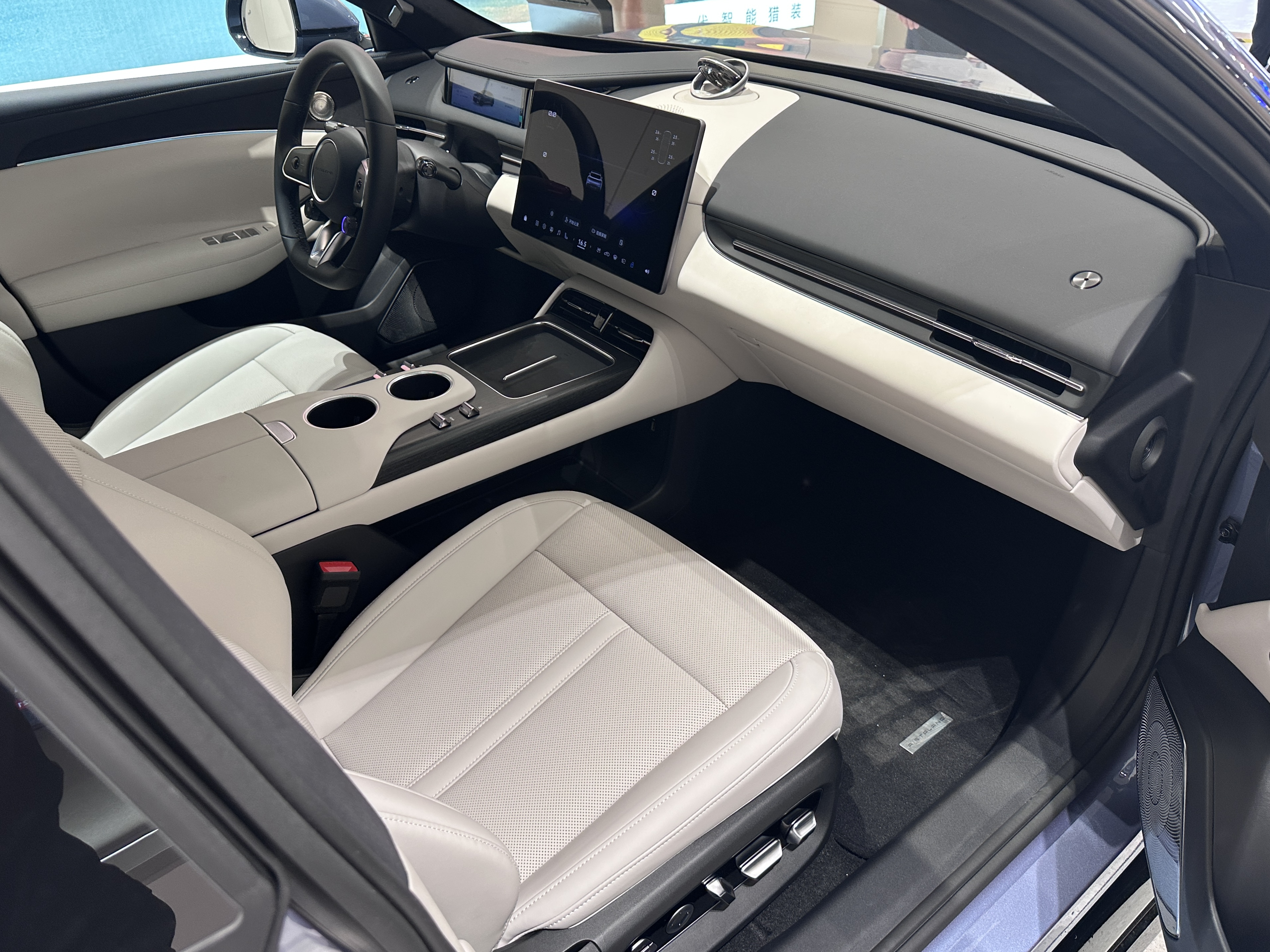
Interior

=== Technology ===
The GT7 is the first production vehicle to feature Huawei's Qiankun ADS 5.0 Ultra autonomous driving system. The sensor suite on higher trims comprises 36 units, including a next-generation 896-channel dual-path imaging lidar along with a second LiDAR and 5 distributed 4D millimetre-wave radars; standard models use the ADS 5.0 Pro system which uses a single Limera in-cabin LiDAR and 3 mmWave radars. The vehicle obtained permits for L3 autonomous driving road testing in Guangzhou and completed 200,000 km (124,000 mi) of real-world L3-level testing prior to launch. It also features Huawei's XMC Smart Chassis system and the HarmonySpace 6 cockpit software platform.

== Powertrain ==
The GT7 is offered in five trim levels across battery electric and range-extended electric configurations, built on an 800-volt high-voltage architecture.

=== Range extender ===
The range extender variant went on sale on 13 November 2026.

The range extender variant uses a GAC-supplied 1.5-liter turbocharged inline-4 petrol engine outputting 161 hp (120 kW; 163 PS), and uses a rear motor outputting 308 hp (230 kW; 312 PS) and 396 N⋅m (292 lb⋅ft). It uses a 35 kWh LFP CATL Freevoy (Xiaoyao) battery pack which provides 205 kilometres (127 mi) of WLTP range and can recharge 10–80% in 17 minutes. It is equipped with 400-volt power electronics.

=== Battery electric ===
The battery electric variants all use an 800-volt powertrain architecture.

The rear-wheel drive battery electric variants use a permanent magnet synchronous motor outputting and of torque. It is either equipped with a 86 kWh LFP CATL Shenxing battery pack providing 770 kilometres (478 mi) of range and recharging 10–80% in 20 minutes, or a 102.8 kWh NMC CATL Qilin pack providing 900 kilometres (559 mi) of range and recharging 10–80% in 12 minutes.

The tri-motor all-wheel drive variant uses an induction front motor outputting 221 hp (165 kW; 224 PS) and 287 N⋅m (212 lb⋅ft) of torque, and two permanent magnet motors each outputting 268 hp (200 kW; 272 PS) and 314 N⋅m (232 lb⋅ft) of torque which independently drive each rear wheel, for a combined output of 758 hp (565 kW; 769 PS) and 915 N⋅m (675 lb⋅ft) of torque. It is only available with the 102.8 kWh NMC battery pack which provides 710 kilometres (441 mi) of CLTC range. It is capable of a 0–100 km/h (62 mph) acceleration time of 2.98 seconds and a top speed of 210 km/h (130 mph).

Specifications
Battery		Motor		Power	Torque	Electric range		DC charging		0–100 km/h (62 mph)	Top speed	Kerb weight
Type	Weight	Front	Rear	Power	Torque	WLTP	CLTC	Peak	10–80%	0–100 km/h (62 mph)	Top speed	Kerb weight
EREV
35.701 kWh Freevoy LFP CATL	285 kg (628 lb)	—	230 kW PMSM	308 hp (230 kW; 312 PS)	396 N⋅m (292 lb⋅ft)	205 km (127 mi)	252 km (157 mi)		17 min	6.1 s	190 km/h (118 mph)	2,230 kg (4,916 lb)
EV
86.111 kWh Shenxing LFP CATL	600 kg (1,323 lb)	—	250 kW TZ220XYF0501 PMSM	335 hp (250 kW; 340 PS)	430 N⋅m (317 lb⋅ft)		770 km (478 mi)	333 kW	20 min	5.9 s	200 km/h (124 mph)	2,295 kg (5,060 lb)
102.768 kWh Qilin NMC CATL	587 kg (1,294 lb)	—	250 kW TZ220XYF0501 PMSM	335 hp (250 kW; 340 PS)	430 N⋅m (317 lb⋅ft)		900 km (559 mi)	618 kW	12 min	5.8 s	200 km/h (124 mph)	2,295 kg (5,060 lb)
102.768 kWh Qilin NMC CATL	587 kg (1,294 lb)	165 kW YS220QY234 induction	2×200 kW TZ220XYF031 PMSM	758 hp (565 kW; 769 PS)	915 N⋅m (675 lb⋅ft)		710 km (441 mi)	618 kW	12 min	2.98 s	210 km/h (130 mph)	2,450 kg (5,401 lb)
