= Epicland =

Chinese premium electric vehicle brand

- Product type: Automobile brand
- Current owner: Dongfeng Motor Corporation; Huawei (Yinwang)
- Country: China
- Introduced: 2026
- Markets: China
- Website: epicland.com.cn

Epicland (Chinese: 奕境; pinyin: Yìjìng) is a Chinese premium new energy vehicle brand co-created by Dongfeng Motor Corporation and Huawei through its Yinwang intelligent automotive solutions unit. Based in Wuhan, it was established in November 2025 and launched publicly in April 2026. The brand is positioned in the premium mid-to-high market tier, occupying the space between Dongfeng's mass-market eπ brand and its higher-end Voyah marque. It is part of Huawei's "Jing" series of co-created automotive brands, alongside Aistaland, which was developed with GAC Group.

Like Aistaland, Epicland is not part of Huawei's Harmony Intelligent Mobility Alliance (HIMA), but instead operates under a distinct "full-stack native co-creation" model in which Huawei's Qiankun unit co-defines, co-develops, and co-operates the brand alongside Dongfeng across the entire vehicle lifecycle, from product definition and design to supply chain and marketing.

== History ==
Cooperation between Dongfeng Motor and Huawei dates to 2018, when the two parties signed a strategic agreement covering intelligent connectivity and electrification. The collaboration deepened over subsequent years, producing models such as the M-Hero M817 and the Voyah Taishan.

On 20 November 2025, at the Huawei Qiankun Ecosystem Conference held just ahead of the 2025 Guangzhou Auto Show, Huawei simultaneously announced two new co-created automotive brands: Qijing (Chinese: 启境), developed with GAC Group and later launched internationally as Aistaland, and Yijing (Chinese: 奕境), developed with Dongfeng. The joint venture was internally referred to by the codename DH during development. The first engineering prototype of the brand's inaugural model rolled off the assembly line on 22 December 2025, and winter testing took place in Mohe City and Hulunbuir in January 2026.

The official name of the debut model was confirmed as the X9 on 20 April 2026 by Wang Junjun, Chairman of Epicland. The Epicland brand and the Epicland X9 were formally launched at the Huawei Qiankun Ecosystem Technology Conference on 23 April 2026, with a global premiere the following day at the 2026 Beijing Auto Show.

To support the brand at launch, Epicland established a sales and service network across 80 cities, with plans to open more than 300 "Epicland's Home" experience centres. Around 80% of the outlet locations were converted from former dealerships of German premium brands, and 60% of dealer partners rank among China's top 100 dealership groups by volume. Epicland has stated plans to launch five models over three years.

== Products ==
- Epicland X9 (2026–present), full-size SUV, BEV/EREV
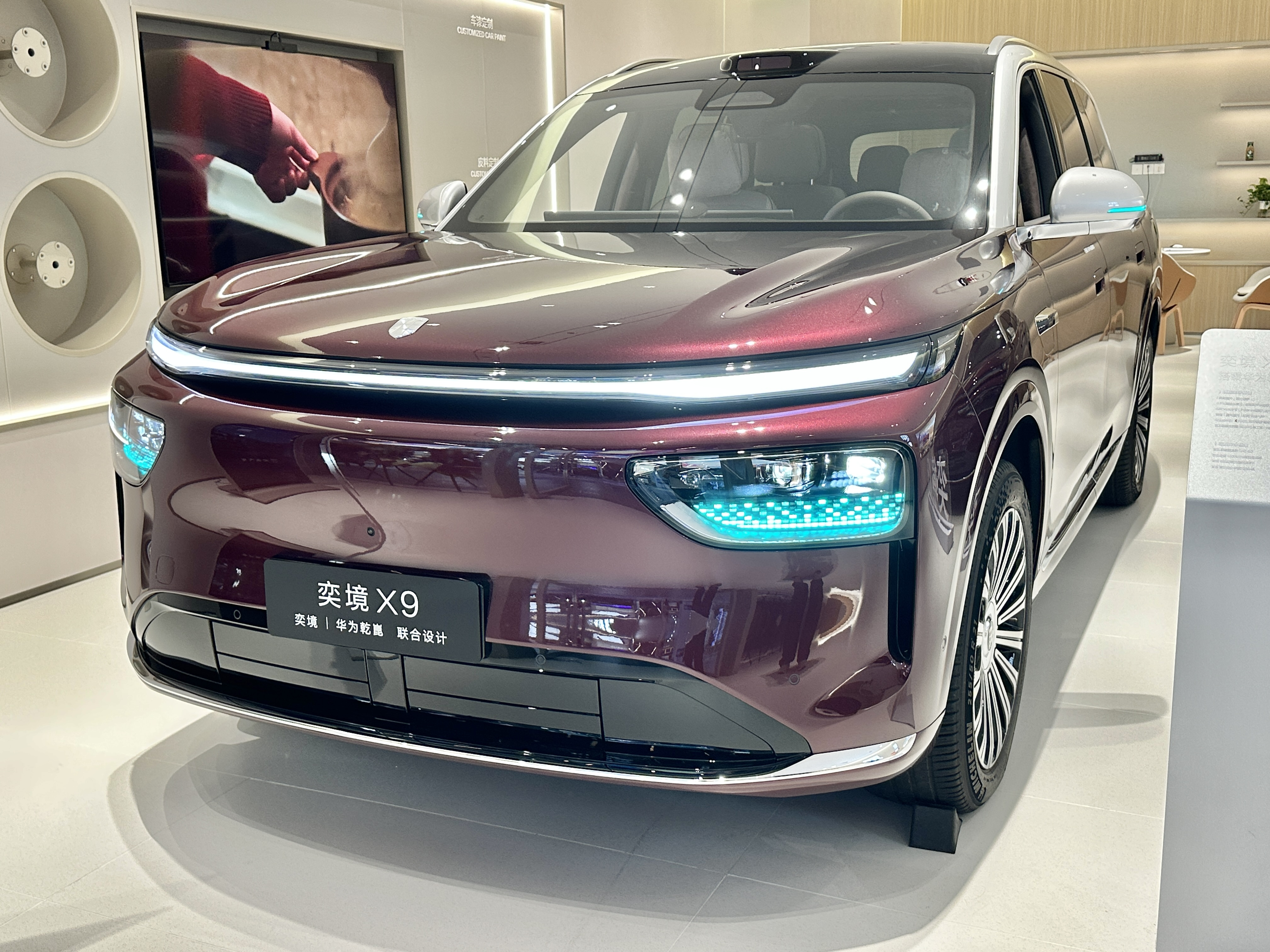
Epicland X9

== See also ==
- Aistaland
