= Renault Altica =

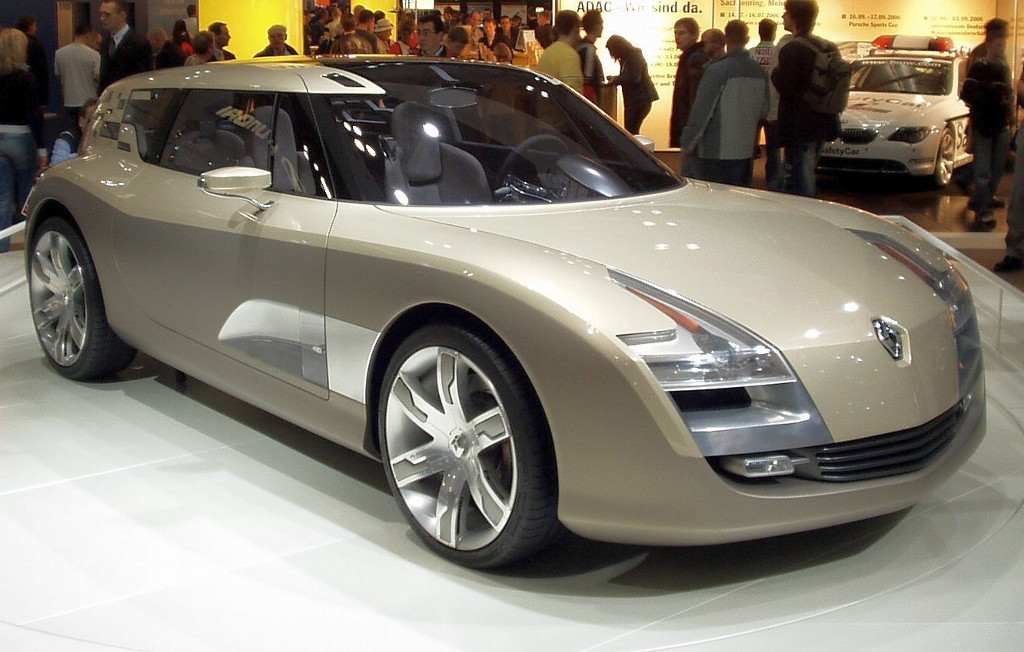

Overview
- Manufacturer: Renault
- Production: 2006 (Concept car)
- Designer: Patrick Le Quément

Body and chassis
- Class: Grand tourer (S)
- Body style: 3-door shooting-brake
- Doors: Butterfly

Powertrain
- Engine: 2.0 litre Diesel dCi
- Transmission: 6-speed manual

Dimensions
- Length: 4,271 mm (168.1 in)
- Width: 1,831 mm (72.1 in)
- Height: 1,350 mm (53.1 in)
- Curb weight: 1,300 kg (2,866 lb)

The Renault Altica is a concept car made by Renault and was debuted at the 2006 Geneva Motor Show. The design of the car is a 3-door 4-seater shooting-brake. The Altica has a luggage capacity of 1,300 litres and four seats, and also features butterfly doors.

== Performance ==
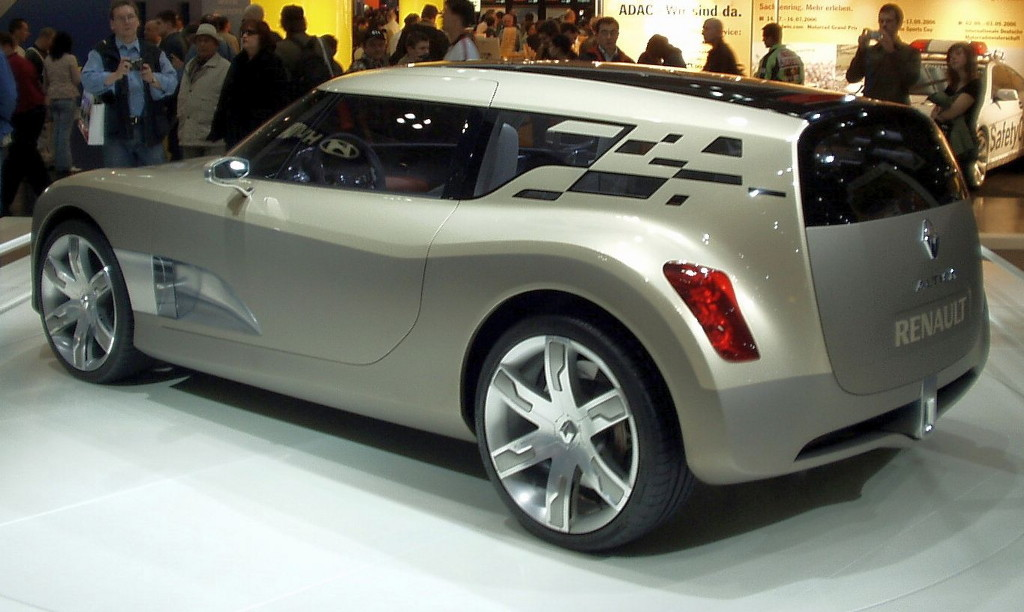
Renault Altica rear

Although the car emits a low 140 kg/km CO_{2} emissions for its class (also due to its aerodynamics and a rear feature called "Synthetic Jet"), the Renault Altica is able to accelerate from 0-60 mph (97 km/h) in 7.5 seconds and its 2.0 litre diesel produces 177 bhp (132 kW; 179 PS) and 380 N⋅m (280 lb⋅ft) of torque.

The Synthetic Jet is a patented aerodynamic device that consists of a 2 mm wide slot located at the extreme rear of the roof. Through this slot air is alternately sucked and blown to control the separation of air depending on the Altica's speed. At 80 mph (128.7 km/h) it is claimed that the Synthetic Jet reduces the Altica's C_{d} by 15% resulting in improved fuel economy.
