= Aistaland =

Chinese premium electric vehicle brand

- Product type: Automobile brand
- Current owner: GAC Group and Huawei (Yinwang)
- Country: China
- Introduced: 2026
- Markets: China
- Website: aistalandauto.com

Aistaland (Chinese: 启境; pinyin: Qǐjìng) is a Chinese premium electric vehicle brand co-created by GAC Group and technology conglomerate Huawei, operating since 2026 and based in Guangzhou. The brand name is derived from the phrase "AI Start New Land", reflecting an ambition to use artificial intelligence to pioneer a new domain of automotive mobility. It is not part of Huawei's Harmony Intelligent Mobility Alliance (HIMA), but instead operates under a distinct cooperation model in which Huawei's Qiankun unit provides a full-stack software and intelligent driving technology package while GAC Group retains responsibility for vehicle manufacturing.

== History ==
In September 2025, GAC Group announced a cooperation with Huawei through its Yinwang unit to establish a new premium electric vehicle brand. The initiative was described as Huawei Qiankun's benchmark project for fully empowering a Greater Bay Area automaker, with Huawei stationing a team of several hundred personnel in Guangzhou to work alongside GAC. Former GAC executive Liu Jiaming was appointed chief executive of the new brand on 25 September 2025.

On 30 January 2026, the first images of a camouflaged prototype of the brand's debut model were released. On 8 March 2026, the Chinese name of the brand was revealed as Qijing (Chinese: 启境). On 17 March 2026, the brand was formally launched under its English name Aistaland alongside the world debut of its first model, the Aistaland GT7.

Following the launch, Aistaland completed a capital increase of approximately 1.099 billion yuan. CATL invested 300 million yuan through its investment arm, taking an 8.28% stake; Bosch participated through Boyuan Capital with an 80 million yuan investment, taking a 2.21% stake; and investment entities from the Shenzhen and Guangzhou municipal governments also participated. Following the funding round, GAC Group retained a combined direct and indirect controlling stake of approximately 69.65%.

== Products ==
- Aistaland GT7 (2026–present), full-size shooting brake, BEV/EREV
- Aistaland GX7 (upcoming), mid-size SUV BEV/EREV
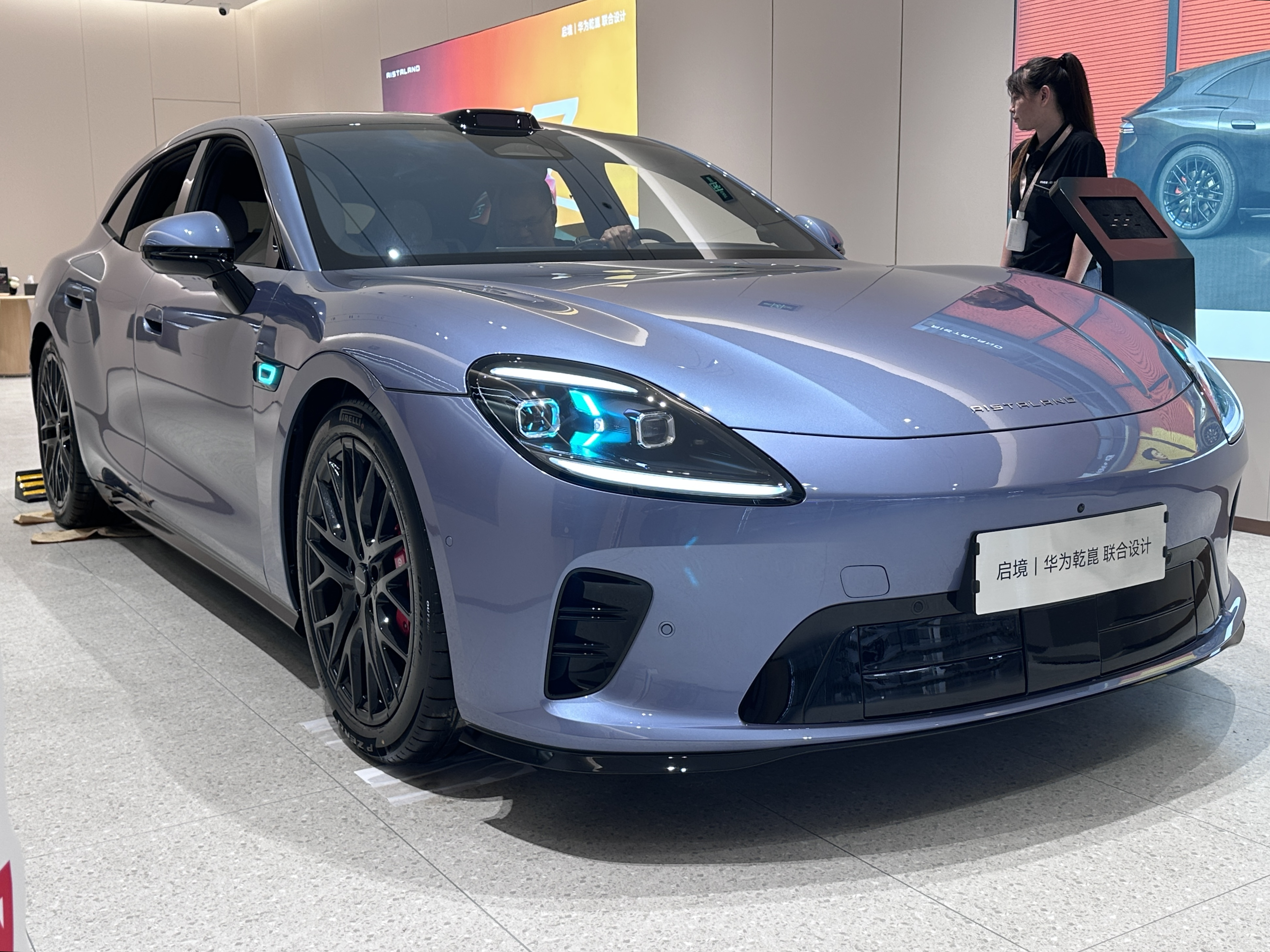
Aistaland GT7

Aistaland GX7

== Sales network ==
Aistaland operates a sales network in China exclusively, with over 300 stores across more than 90 cities under a dual-format retail model as of June 2026.

== See also ==
- Epicland
