= Shooting brake =

Car body style

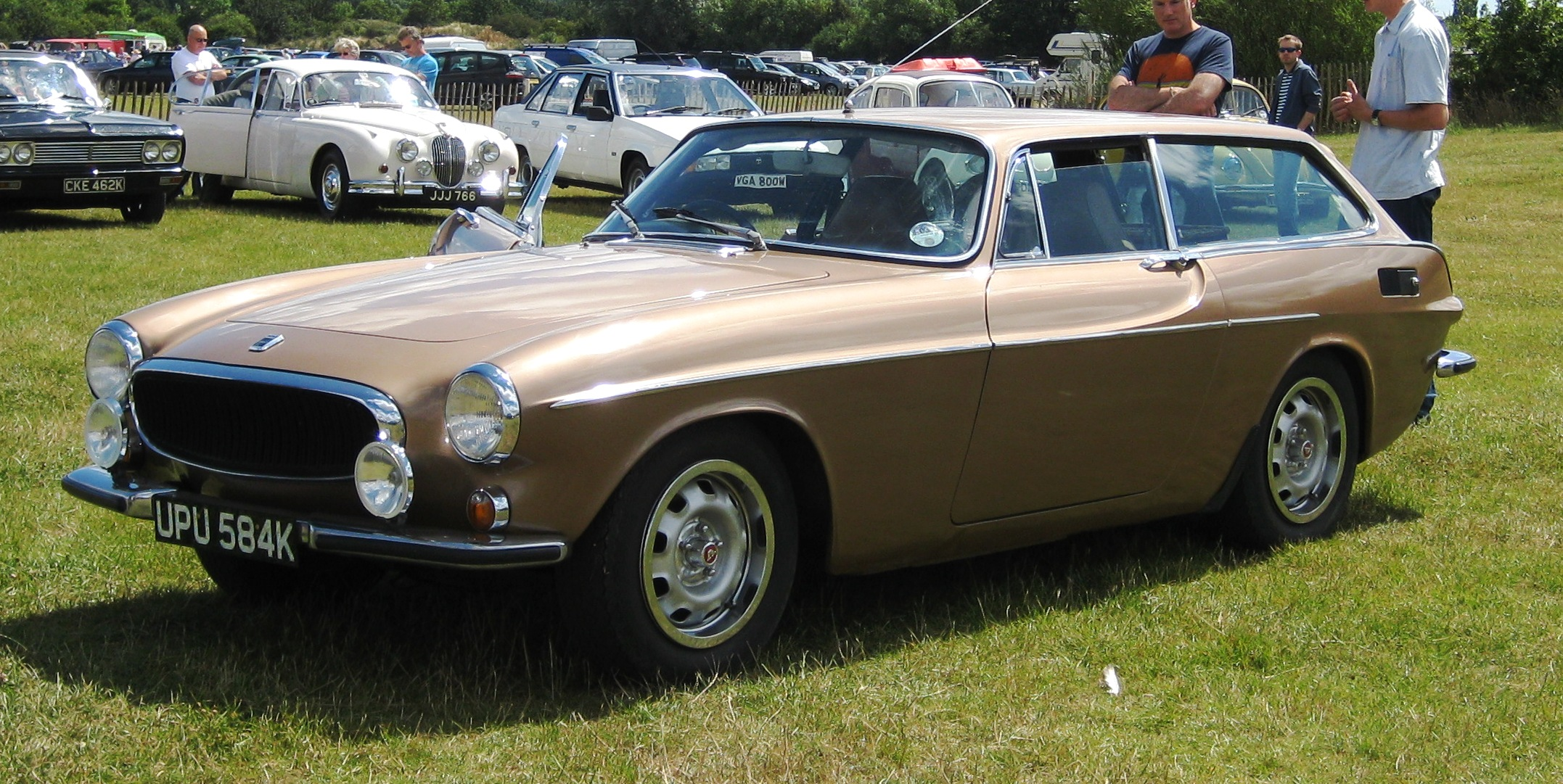
Volvo 1800ES (1972–1973)

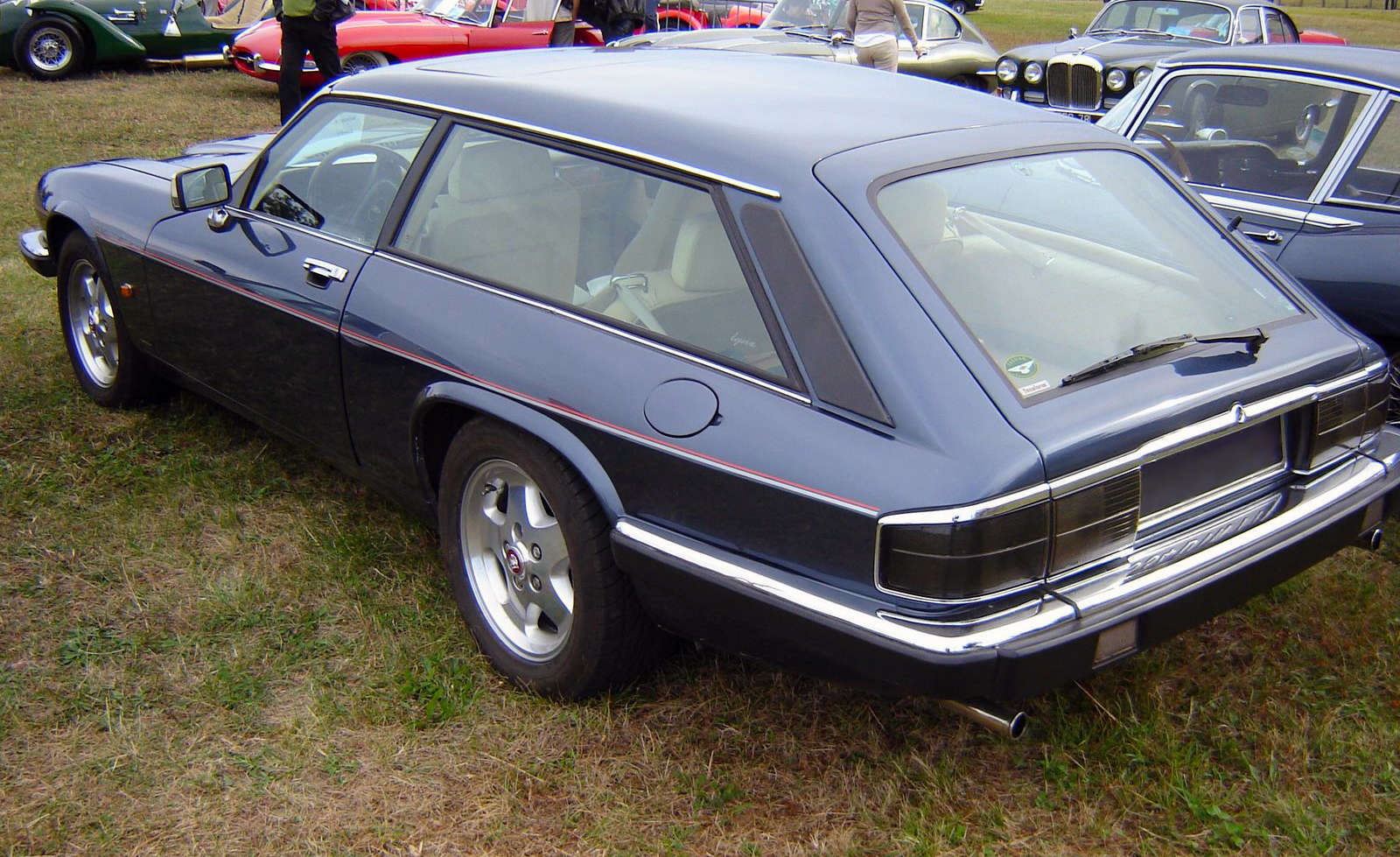
Jaguar XJ-S-based Lynx Eventer

Shooting-brake (alternatively: shooting break) is a term describing a car body style, which is used but not clearly defined. The style originated in the 1890s as a horse-drawn wagon for transporting shooting parties along with their equipment and game. The vehicles themselves were manufactured in the early 1900s in the United Kingdom by vehicle manufacturers or coachbuilders.

In the 19th and early 20th centuries, a "brake" (or "break") was a heavy, open carriage with a high driver's seat, used for training or "breaking" young horses. The term shooting break gave rise to the French term break de chasse, again referring to a type of wagon used for hunting.

After the original shooting brake body style became mostly obsolete, that is, the carriage for hunters and their gear, the term itself was used with a succession of other body styles.

In England, during the 1920s and 1930s, the term shooting brake became interchangeable with estate car (i.e., station wagon). In British English, the term gradually fell out of use, though in French the term break became synonymous with the station wagon body style.

Since the 1960s, a definition for term shooting brake has remained open to interpretation. It began being used to describe a sporty combination of station wagon and two-door coupé body styles – – i.e., a more practical variant of a less practical body style. During the 1960s and early 1970s, several high-end European manufacturers began using the term shooting brake to describe a sporty, two-door, wagon-like body style. Following a hiatus from the mid 1970s until the early 2010s, the term shooting-brake entered a resurgence.

== Horse-drawn origins ==
A horse-drawn shooting brake was a variation of the break (also spelled brake). Originally built as a simple but heavy frame for breaking in young horses to drive, over time it became a gentleman-driven vehicle and was popular for shooting parties. Taking the design from the rear-loading horse-drawn sporting vehicle, the body style became known as the "shooting brake".

== Definition ==
The term shooting brake is used variously to describe any number of body styles; typically combining coupé and station wagon elements. Descriptions of the body style associated with the term include:

- "A sleek wagon with two doors and sports-car panache, its image entangled with European aristocracy, fox hunts, and baying hounds".
- "A cross between an estate and a coupé".
- "Essentially a two-door station wagon".
- An interchangeable term for estate car (station wagon). In France, a station wagon is marketed as a break, once having been called a break de chasse, which translates as "hunting break".
- "The shooting brake, however, is a luxury coupe with a squared-off back."
- A vehicle "conceived to take gentlemen on the hunt with their firearms and dogs. While the name has been loosely applied to station wagons in general, the most famous shooting brakes had custom two-door bodies fitted to the chassis of pedigreed cars".

=== 1900s to 1950s ===
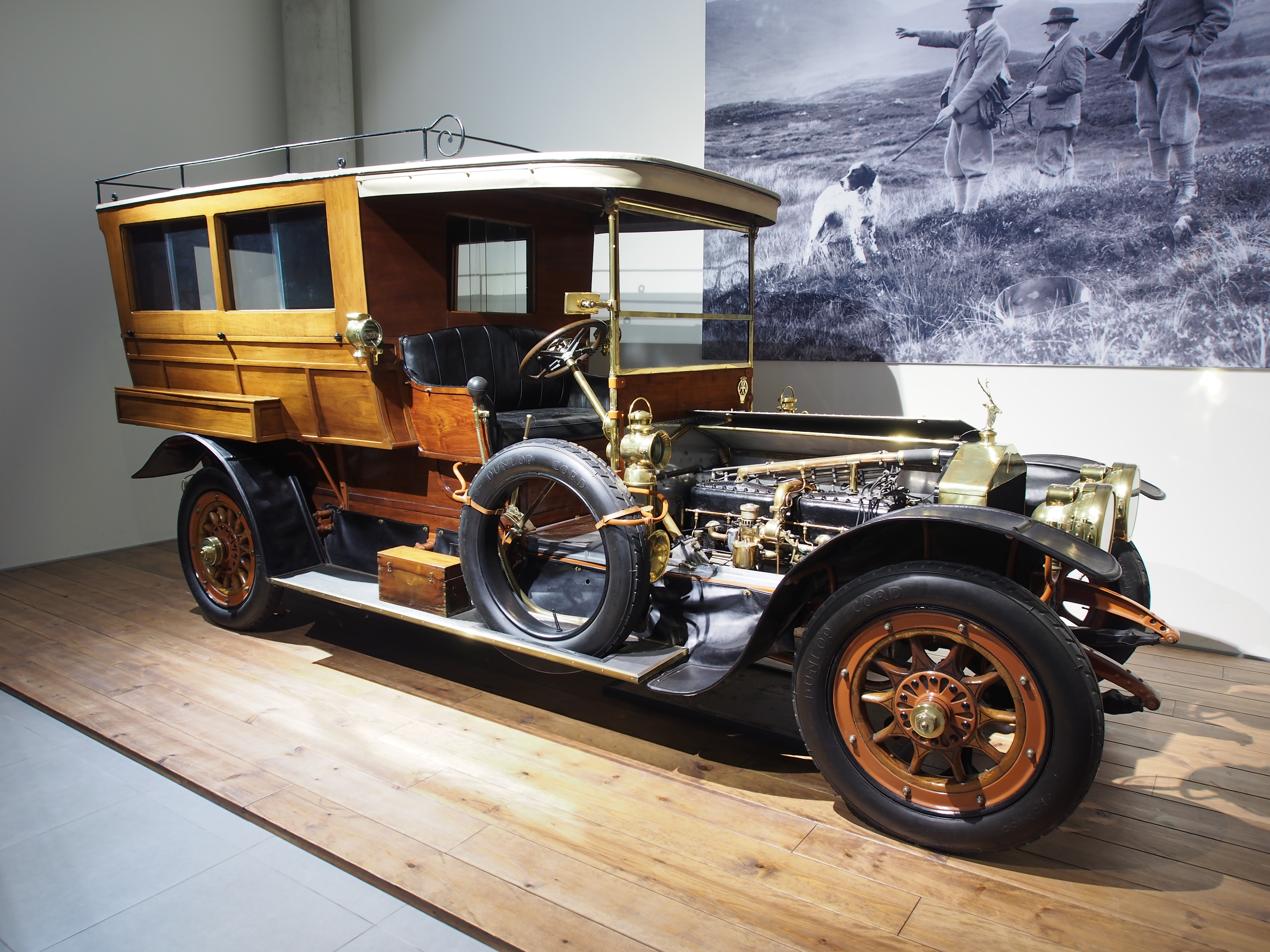
1910 Rolls-Royce Silver Ghost Shooting Brake

In the early 1900s, the Scottish Albion Motors began producing shooting brake models, described in the weekly magazine The Commercial Motor as having "seats for eight persons as well as the driver, whilst four guns and a large supply of cartridges, provisions baskets and a good 'bag' can be carried." The 1912 Hudson Model 33 was described in England as a shooting brake, on the basis that "it was also used to carry the beaters to and from the location of the shoot, and for bringing back the game shot".

Early motorized safari vehicles were described as shooting brakes with no windows or doors. One such description read: "Instead roll-down canvas curtains were buttoned to the roof in the case of bad weather. These cars were heavy and comfortable in good weather and allowed quick and silent exit as no shooting was permitted from the vehicles." During the 1920s and 1930s, shooting brake vehicles were popular in England and were produced as shooting brakes from the factory or converted by coachbuilders. The term "estate car" began to be used instead of shooting brake, as the use of the vehicle expanded from just shooting parties to other domestic uses including ferrying guests and their luggage to and from railway stations.

=== 1960s to 1990s ===
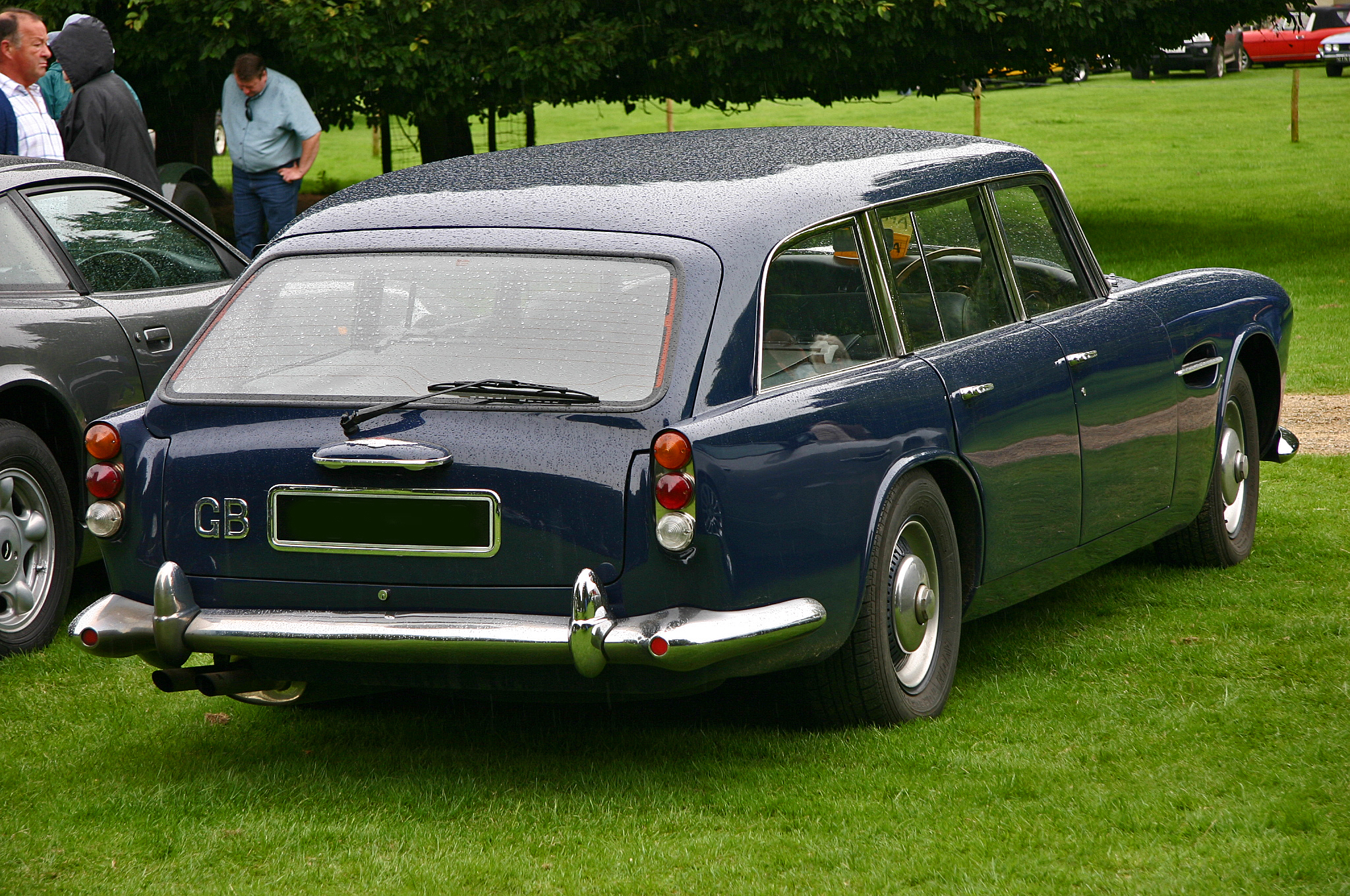
Lagonda Rapide Shooting Brake

During the 1960s and early 1970s, several high-end European manufacturers produced two-door shooting brake versions of their sports cars, including the 1960 Sunbeam Alpine Shooting Brake and 1966 Aston Martin DB5 Shooting Brake. The 1966 Sunbeam Alpine was a limited-production three-door variant of its two-door open sports car with leather interior and walnut trim, selling at a price double its open counterpart and marketed as a shooting brake. The Aston Martin DB5, DB6, and DBS shooting brakes were custom manufactured by coachbuilder Harold Radford from 1965 until 1967.

A prototype DB5 shooting-brake was custom produced by the factory for David Brown, an avid hunter and dog owner, and a further 11–12 coupés were custom modified for Aston Martin by independent coachbuilder Harold Radford. In August 2019 a DB5 sold for a record $1.765m (£1.456m), making it the most valuable Shooting Brake bodied-car of any marque sold at auction. In 1992, Aston Martin manufactured in-house a limited production shooting brake variant of its Virage/Vantage, including a four-door shooting brake.

Other cars combining elements of a wagon and coupé have been described but were never formally marketed as shooting brakes, including the Reliant Scimitar GTE (1968–1975), the Volvo P1800 ES (1972–1973), and the later 480 (1986–1995) – marketed as a coupé, and with a sporty, low nose featuring pop-up headlights, but with a distinctly estate-like rear body. The 1998 BMW Z3 Coupé (plus associated M Coupé model) is also typically referred to as a shooting brake.

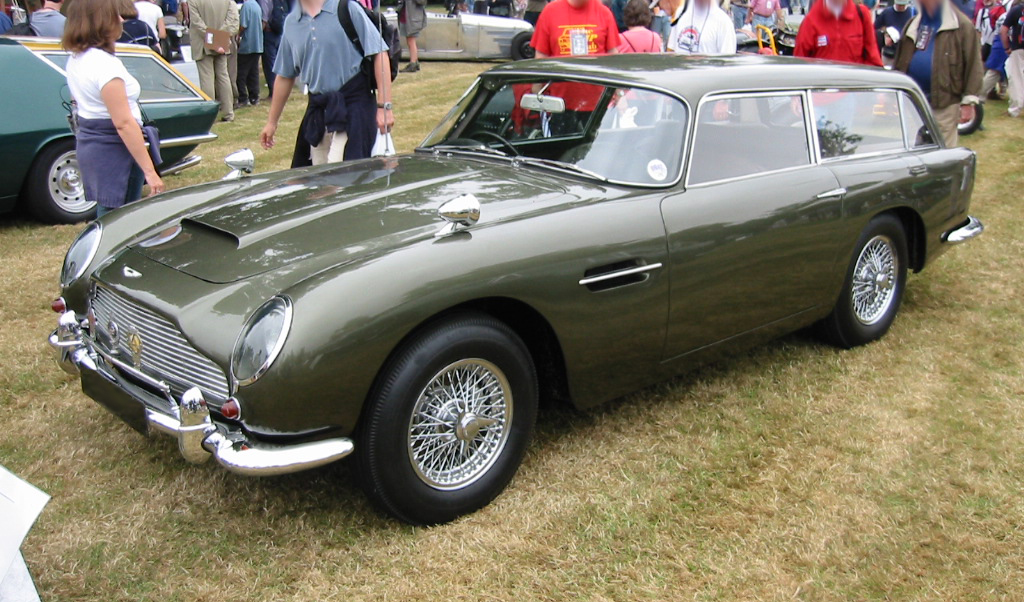
Aston Martin DB5 Shooting Brake (1965–1971)

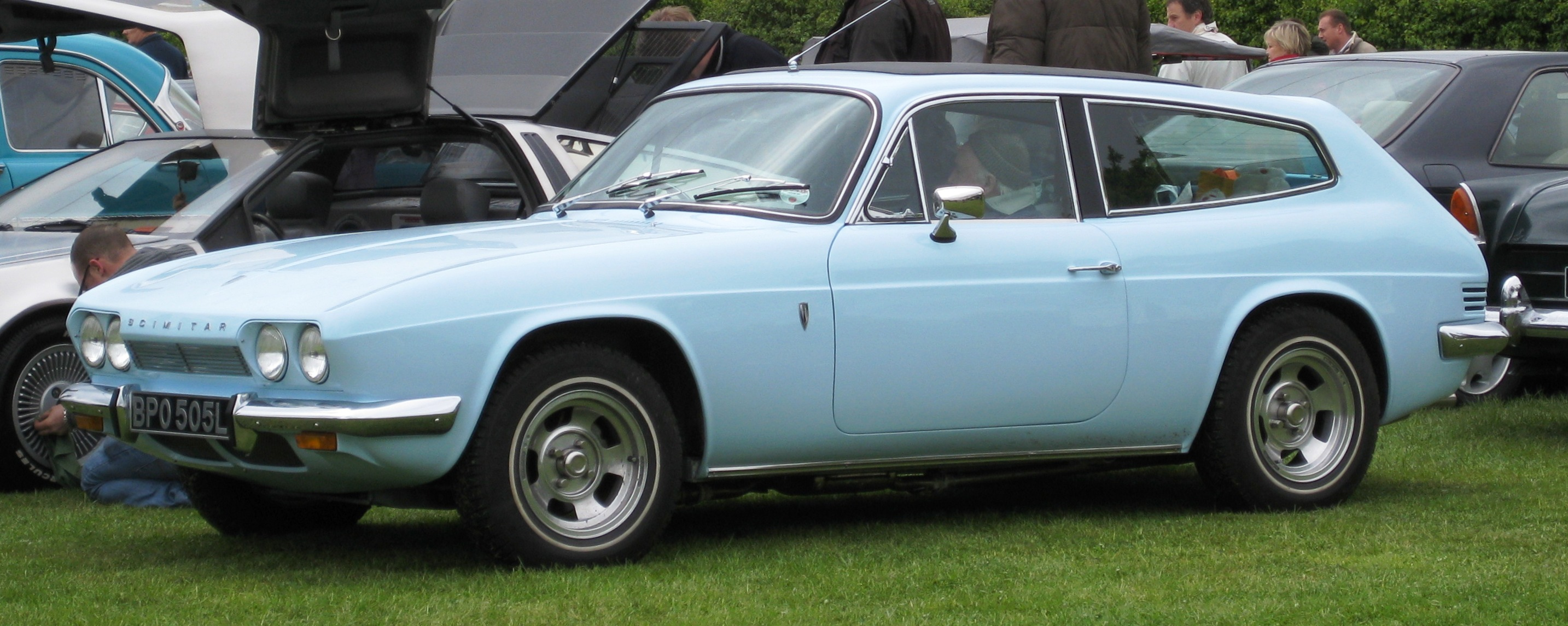
Reliant Scimitar GTE (1968–1975)

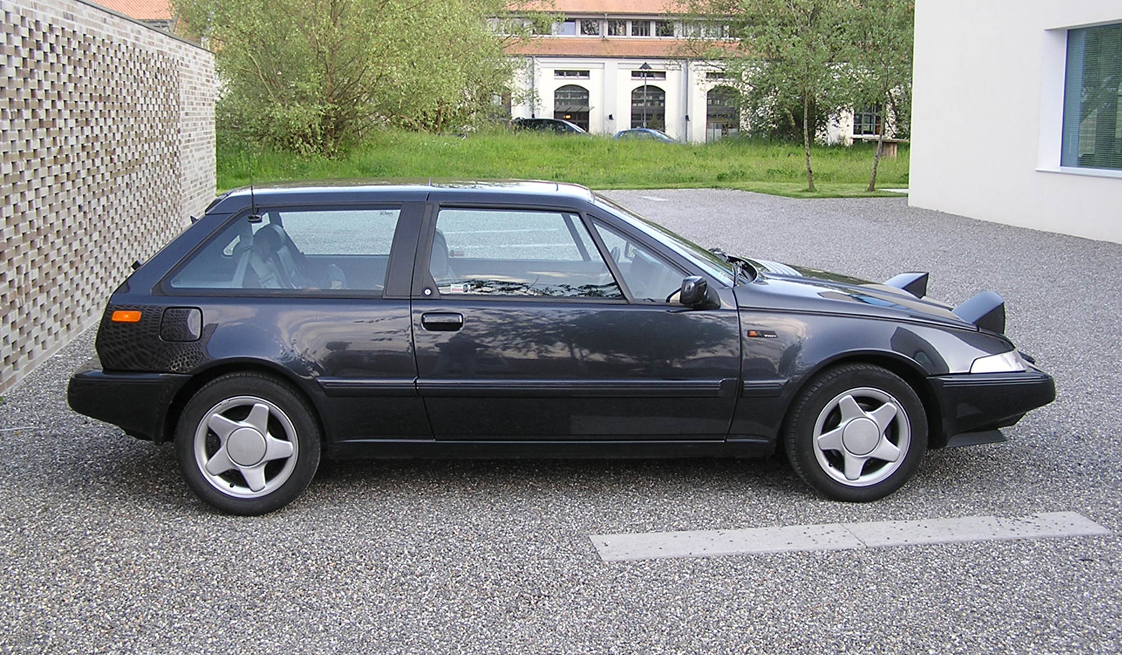
Volvo 480 (1986–1995)

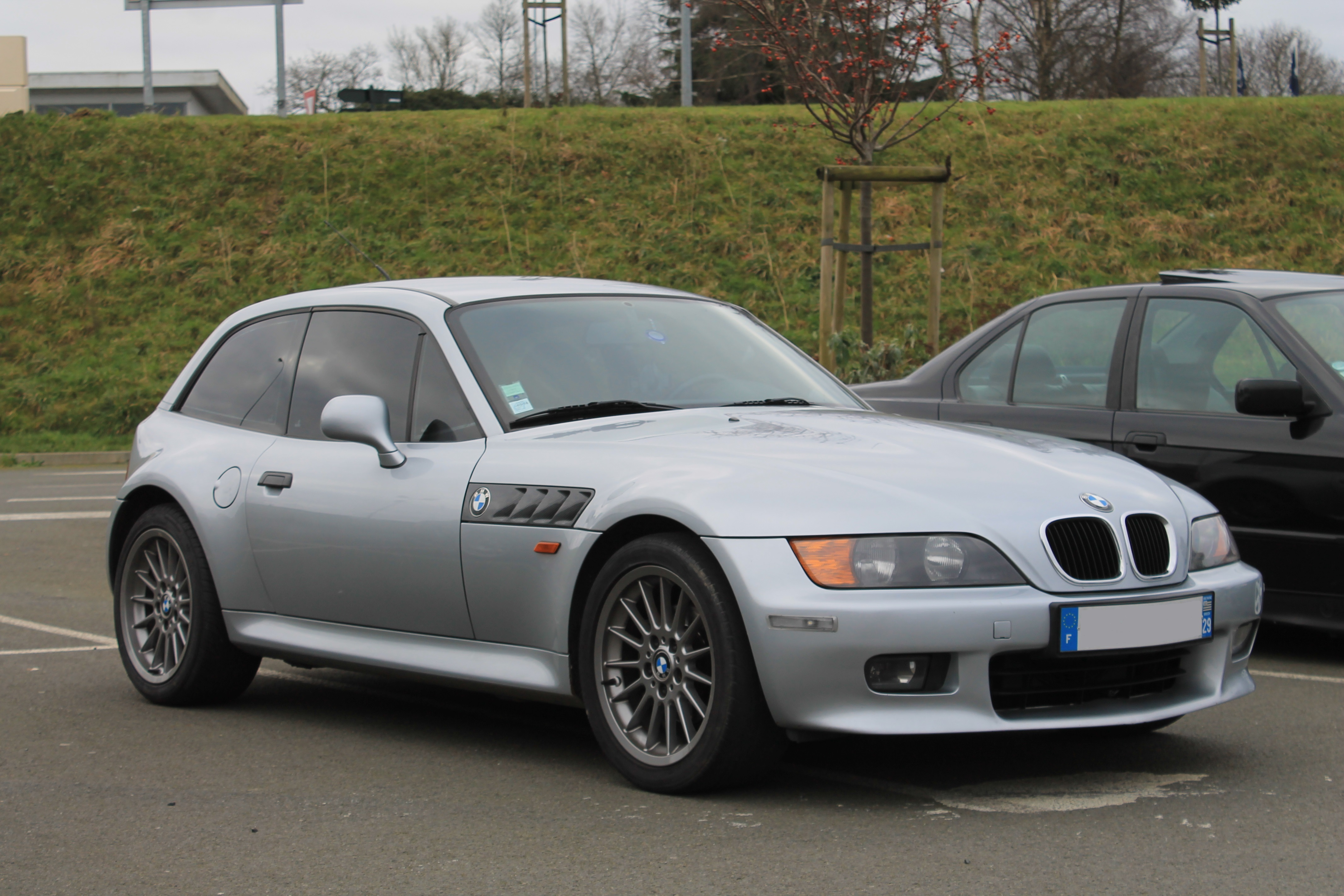
BMW Z3 Coupé (1998-2002)

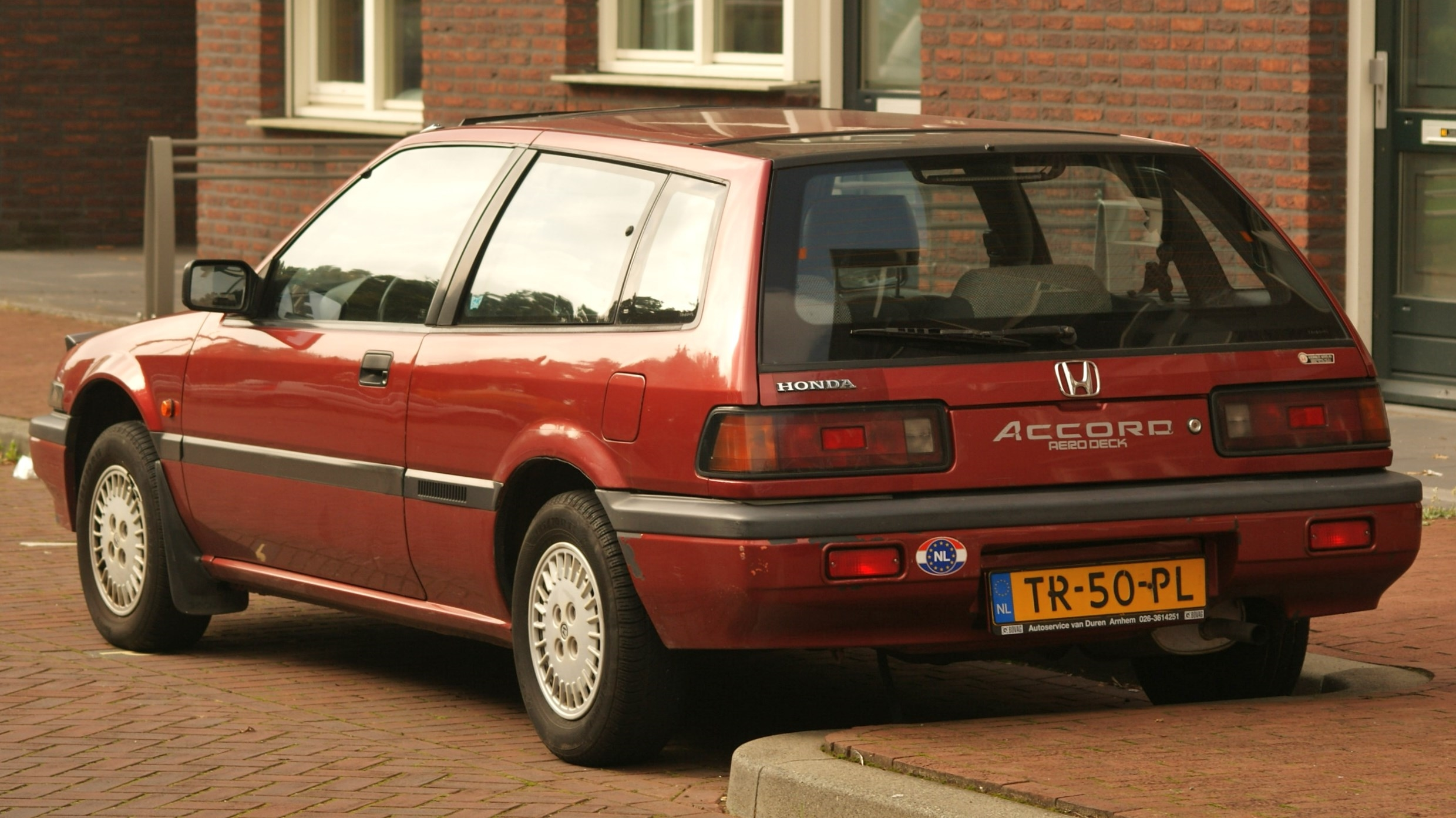
Honda Accord Aerodeck (1986-1989)

=== 2000s to present ===
Mostly dormant since the mid-1970s, the shooting brake term was used in 2004 to describe the Chevrolet Nomad concept car. The following year, the Audi Shooting Brake concept car debuted at the Tokyo Motor Show. In recent years, several other cars, many of which have 4/5 doors have been described by auto marketers and journalists as shooting brakes, including 2005 Dodge Magnum station wagon, 2006 Renault Altica concept car, 2008 Mini Clubman, 2011 Fisker Surf concept car, and the 2011 Ferrari FF. The first production model of the 21st century marketed as a shooting brake was the 2012 Mercedes Benz CLS-Class Shooting Brake (X218), which was previewed as the Shooting Brake concept car at Auto China. This model has four passenger doors, which is at odds with some definitions of a shooting brake as having two doors. In 2015, Mercedes-Benz added the smaller CLA-Class four-door shooting brake to the model range.

The 2018 Porsche Panamera Sport Turismo, along with the Volkswagen Arteon despite the Arteon having five doors, are both described by their manufacturer as shooting brakes. The trend is to associate the shooting brake body style with "performance" while being "more practical" than a coupé. The marketing descriptions have been further blurred between variations of the terms with names such as sports tourer or sportback as a way to differentiate from SUVs and reposition ordinary body styles. BMW unveiled the Concept Touring Coupé based on the Z4 at the Concorso d'Eleganza Villa d'Este in 2023.

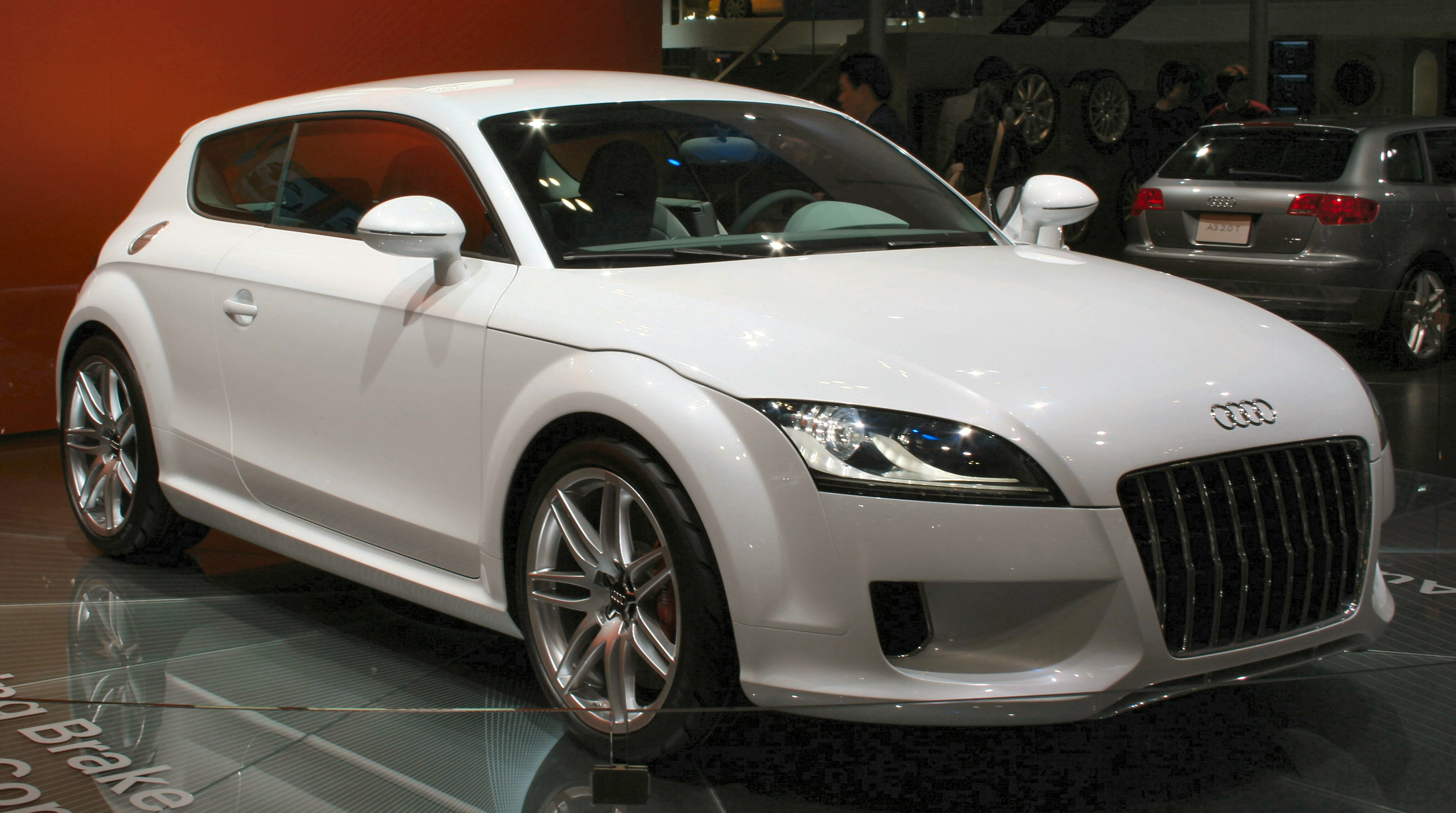
2005 Audi Shooting Brake Concept

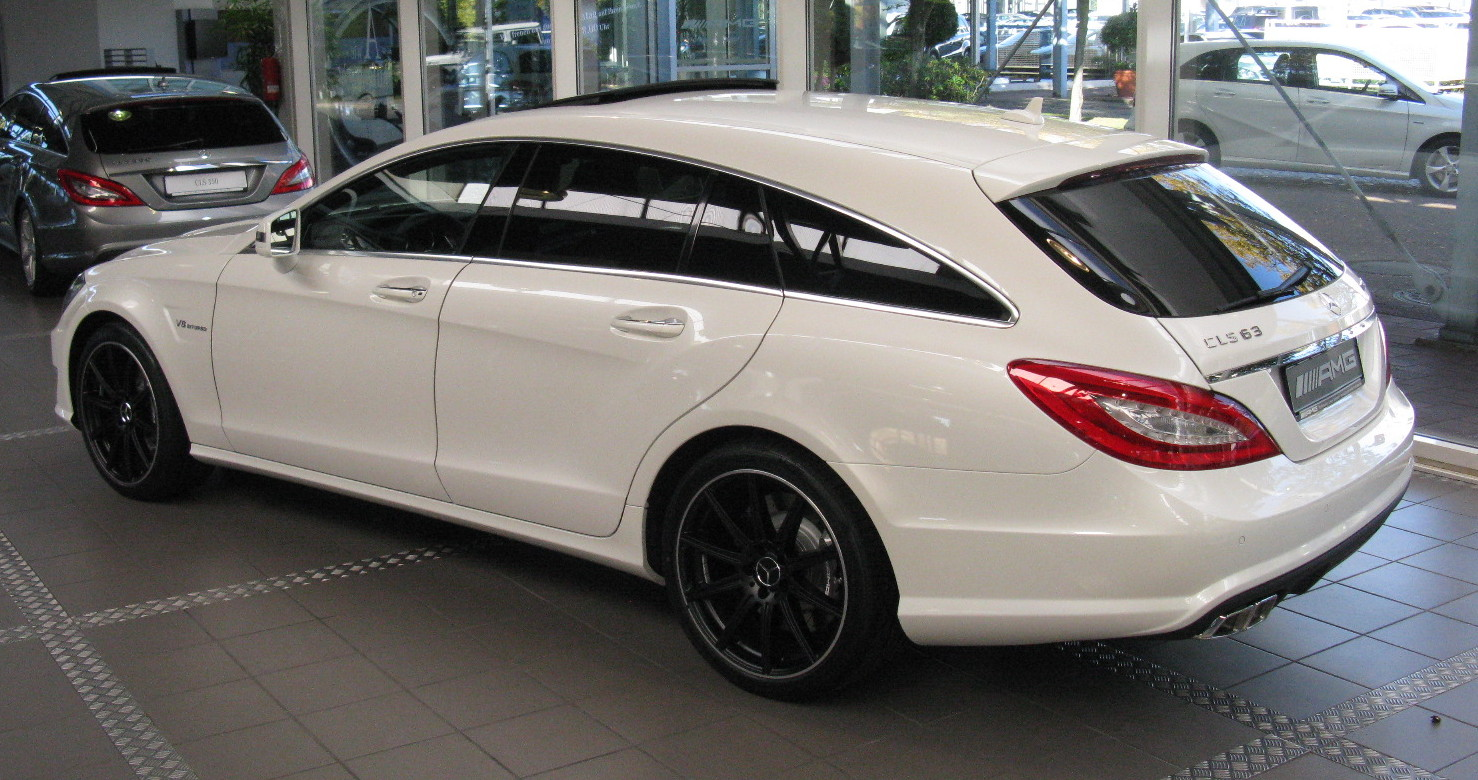
Mercedes-Benz CLS 63 AMG (2012), a five-door station wagon that the manufacturer dubbed shooting brake

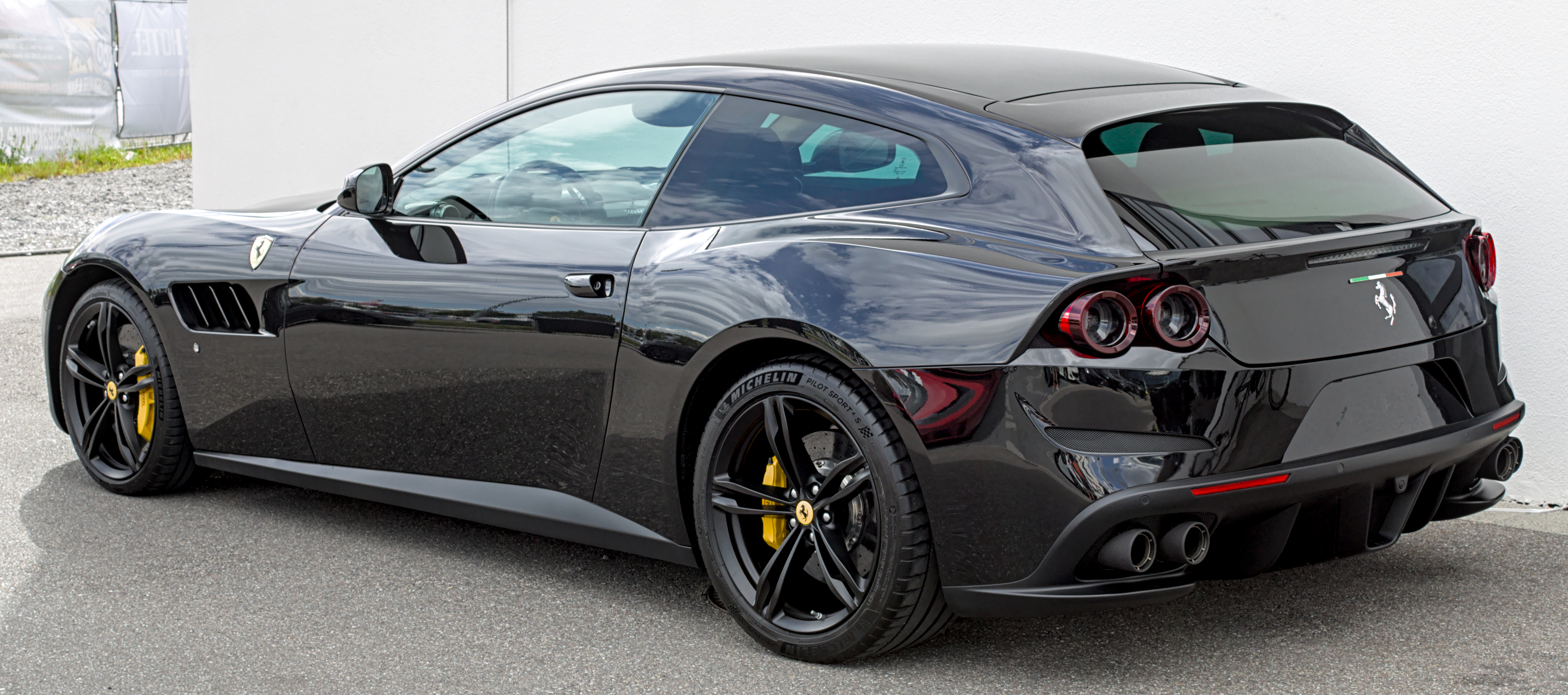
Ferrari GTC4Lusso

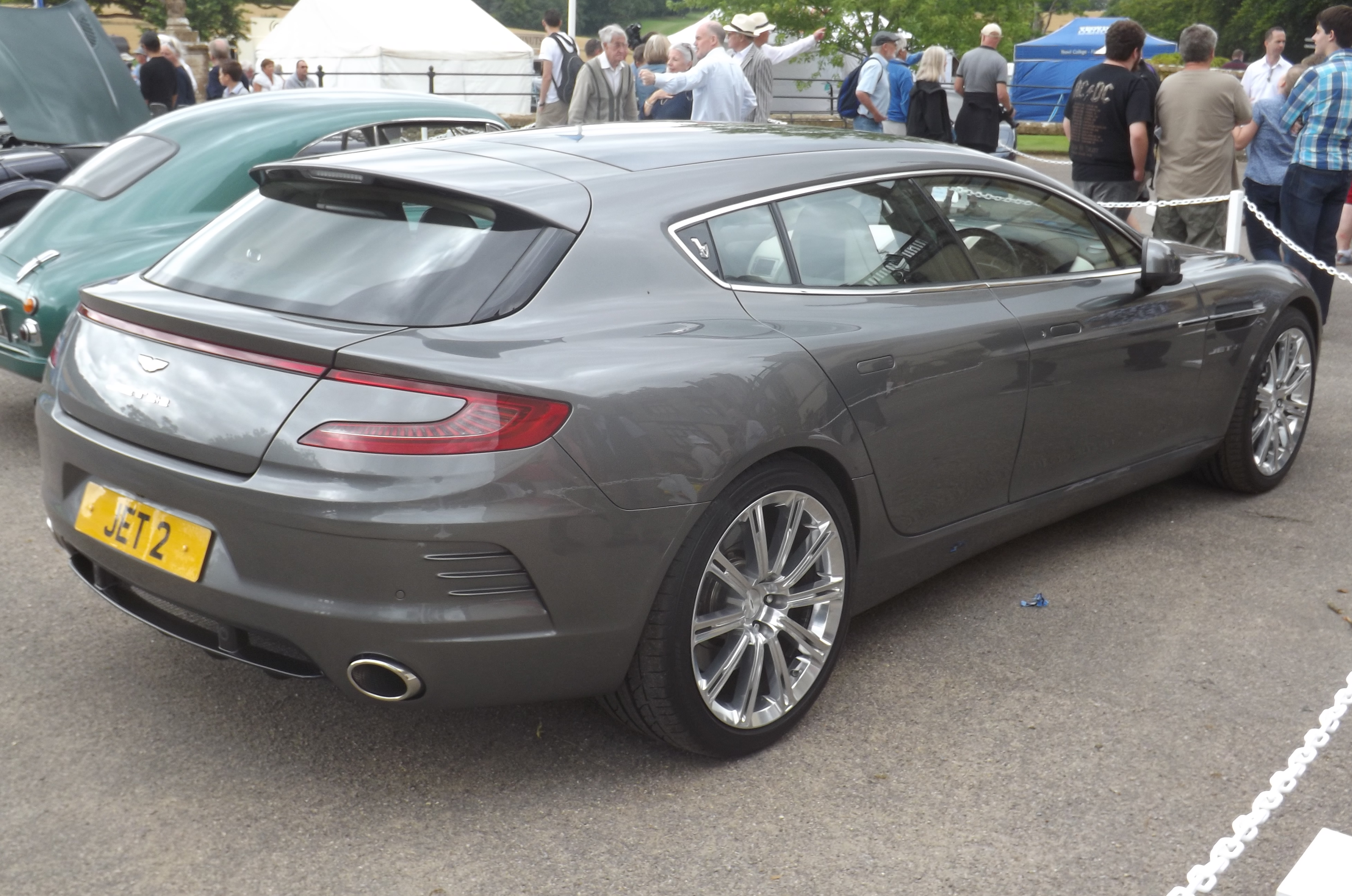
Aston Martin Rapide Bertone Jet 2+2

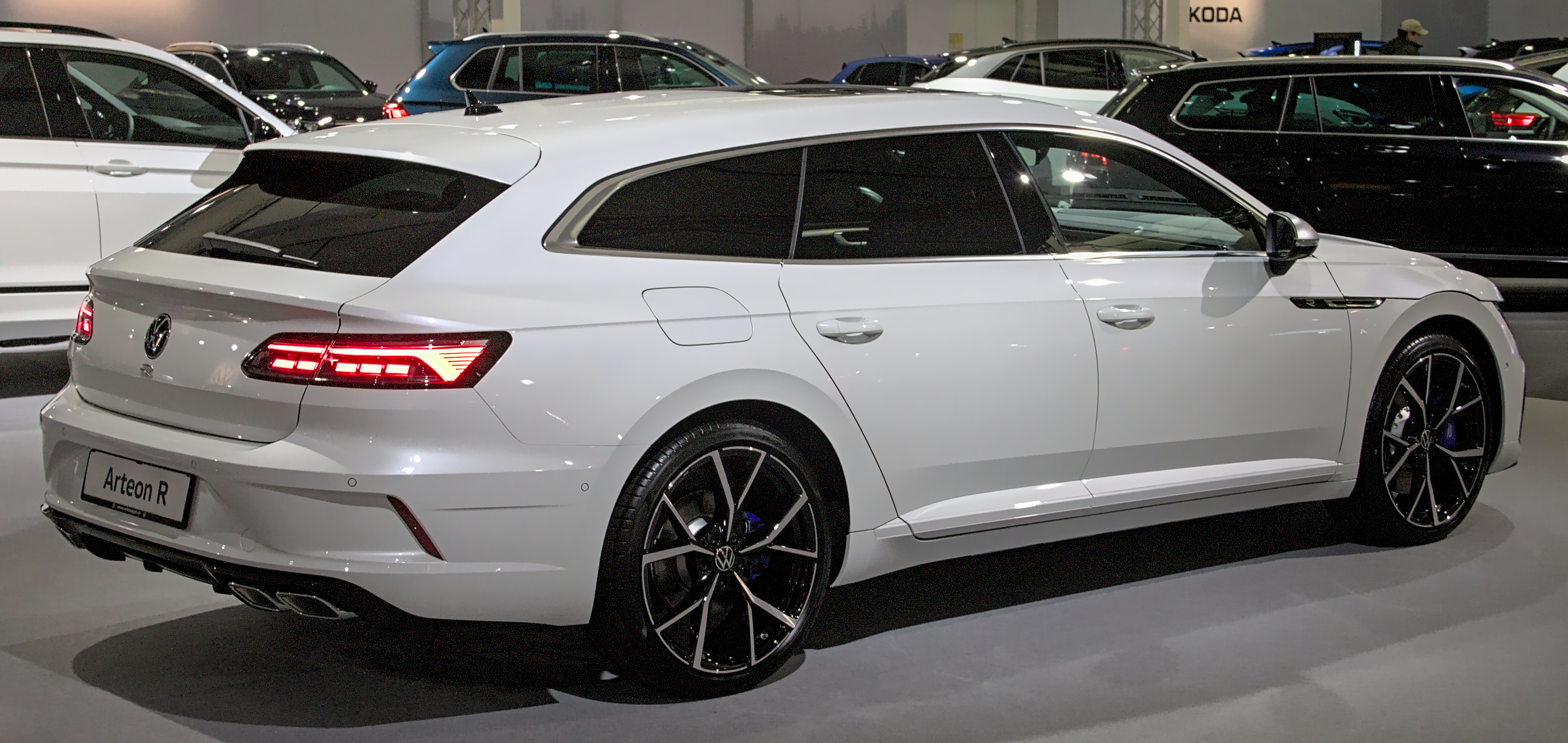
Volkswagen Arteon

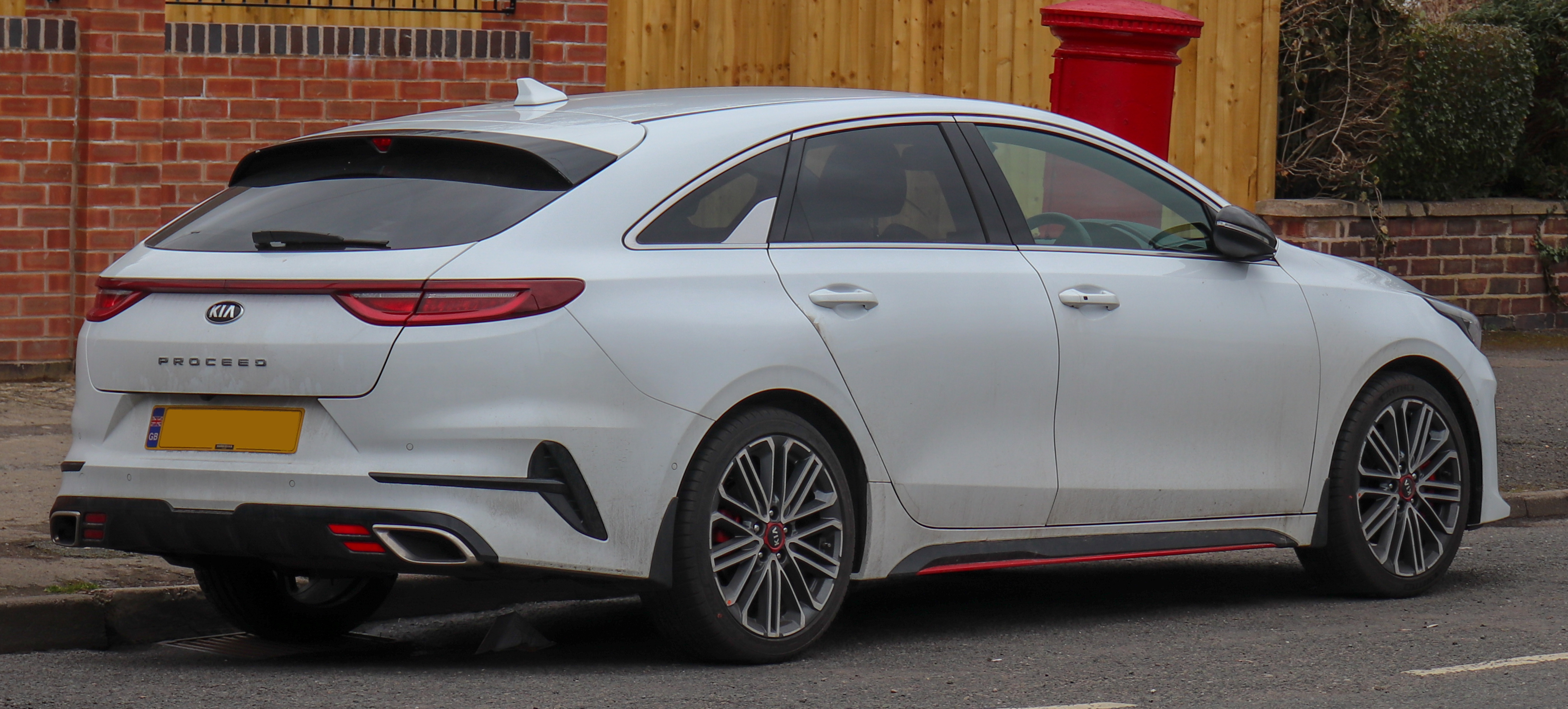
Kia Proceed

== See also ==
- Coupé
- Hatchback
- Station wagon
