= Luxury car =

Marketing term for a highly comfortable vehicle

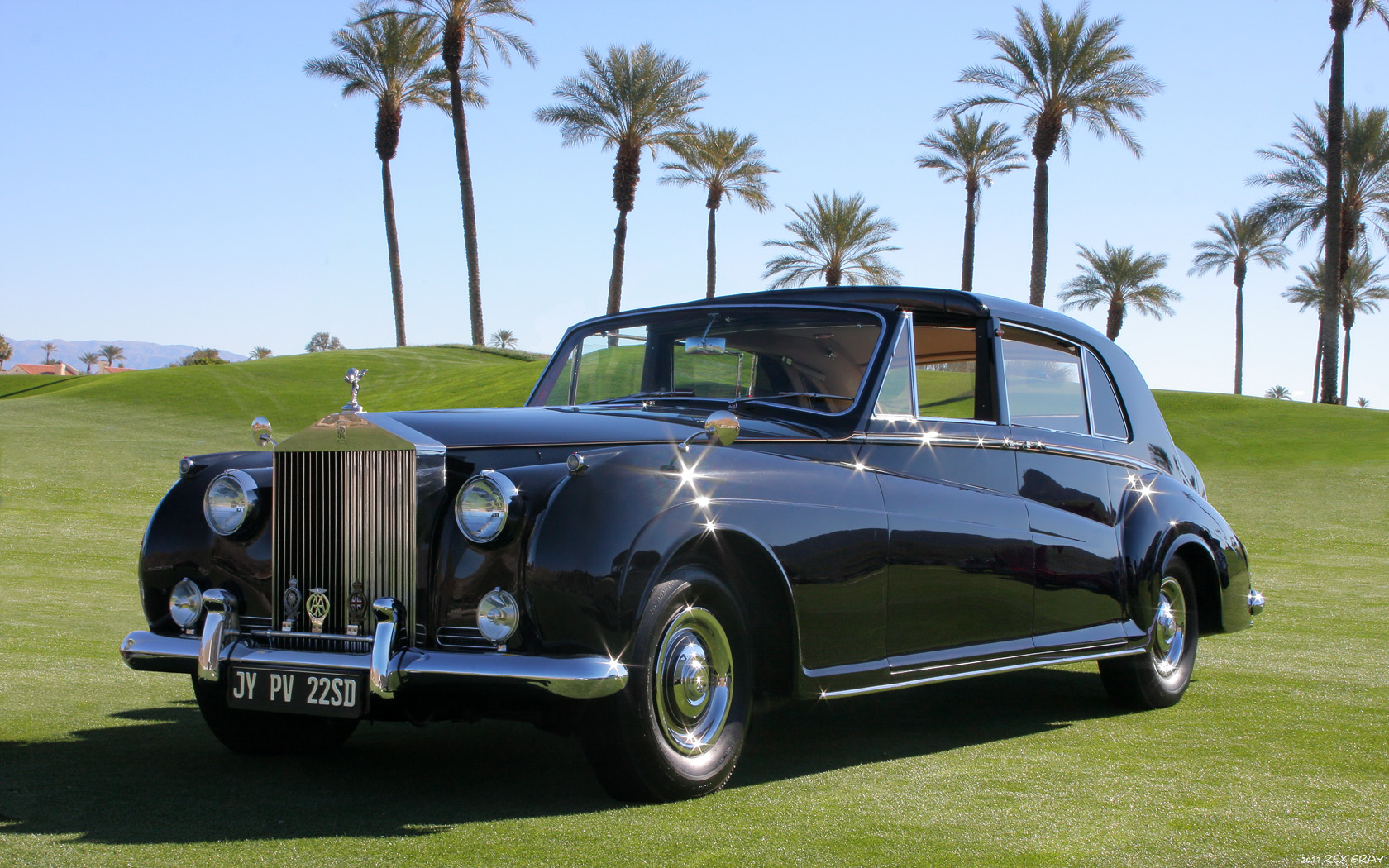
Rolls-Royce Phantom V (1959–1968)

A luxury car is a passenger automobile providing superior comfort levels, features, and equipment. More expensive materials and surface finishes are used, and buyers expect a correspondingly high build quality.

The term is relative and unavoidably subjective, reflecting both objective qualities of a car and the projected and perceived image of the vehicle's marque. Luxury brands rank above premium brands, though there is no clear distinction between the two.

Luxury cars span from sports cars to large saloons and sport utility vehicles. "Compact" luxury vehicles also fill a niche.

== Classification standards ==
Several car classification schemes include a luxury category, such as:

- Australia: Since 2000, the Federal Government's luxury car tax applies to new vehicles over a certain purchase price, with higher thresholds applying for cars classified as fuel-efficient. As of 2019, the thresholds were approximately AU$66,000 (US$50,000) for standard cars and AU$76,000 (US$57,000) for fuel-efficient vehicles.
- Europe: Luxury cars are classified as F-segment vehicles in the European Commission classification scheme.
- Italy: The term "auto di lusso" is used for luxury cars.
- France: The term "voiture de luxe" is used for luxury cars.
- Germany: The term German: Oberklasse (upper class) is used for luxury cars.
- Russia: The term автомобиль представительского класса ("representative class vehicle", also translated as "luxury vehicle") is used for luxury cars.
- Rental cars: The ACRISS Car Classification Code is a system used by many car rental companies to define equivalent vehicles across brands. This system includes "Luxury" and "Luxury Elite" categories (along with "Premium" and "Premium Elite" categories). The criteria for a vehicle to be considered "luxury" are not published.

== Characteristics ==
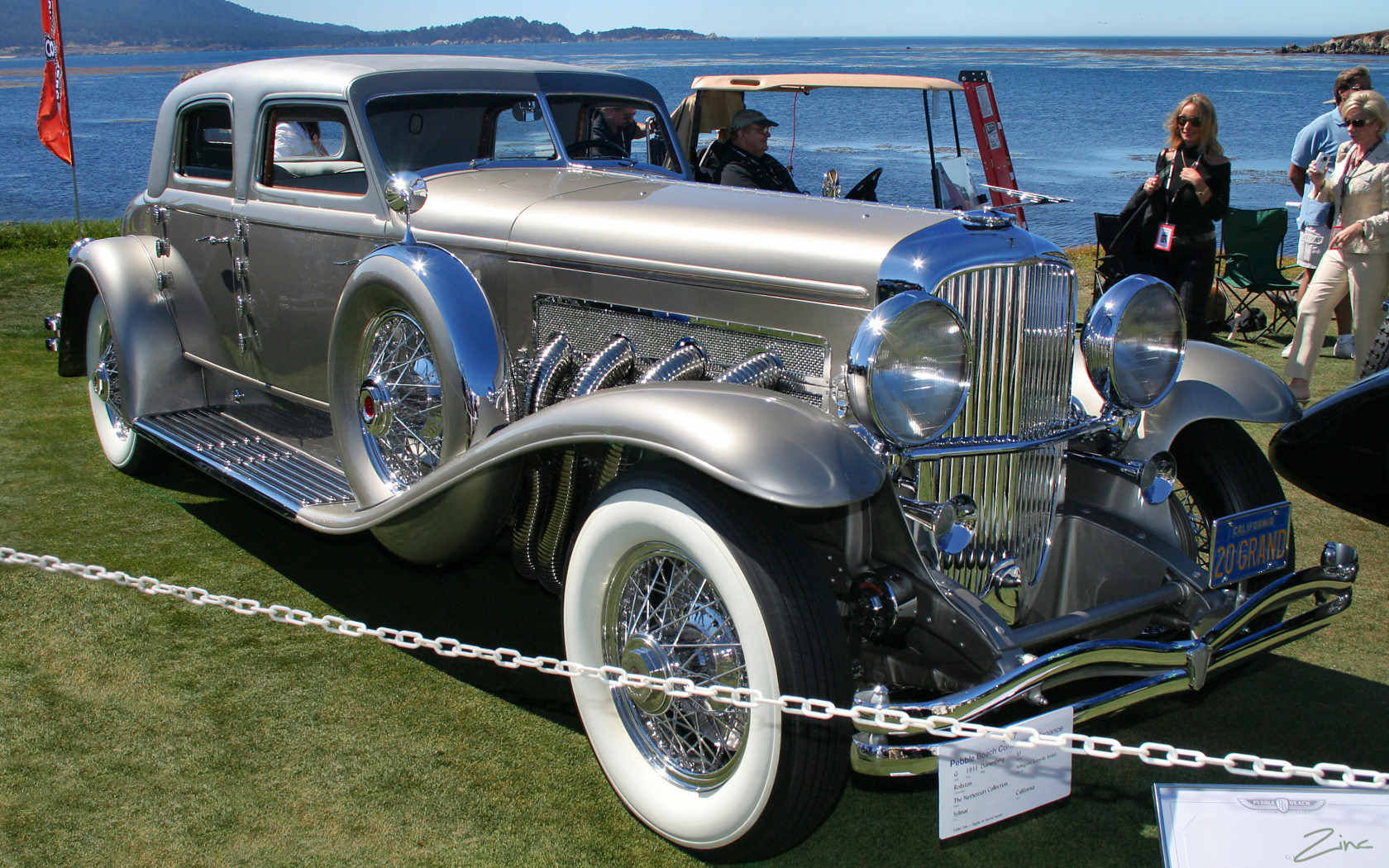
1933 Duesenberg SJ "Twenty Grand"

=== Features ===
Luxury cars have traditionally emphasized higher levels of comfort, performance, and safety. Manufacturers often introduce new safety technologies and comfort amenities on luxury models before they are available on more affordable models. Some brands, like Audi, BMW, and Mercedes-Benz sell lower-priced models under their badge that are smaller or have limited features to expand their market to price-sensitive consumers.

Luxury vehicles can be a status symbol for conspicuous consumption. However, to lessen the theft of the most exotic models in a line, and cater to European luxury car buyers who shy away from being identified with conspicuous consumption, brands offer buyers the option of removing exterior badges that identify the model name or engine size.

The suspension system of most luxury cars is tuned to prioritize ride quality over handling; however, some are marketed as "sports luxury" and have a greater emphasis on handling characteristics, while others seek to strike a balance between the two.

=== Layout and powertrain ===
Modern luxury vehicles increasingly prioritize ride comfort, cabin refinement, and smooth power delivery.

Traditionally, luxury cars have used a front-engine, rear-wheel drive (FR) layout. Due to improvements in technology, the FR layout is more expensive to produce; however, it allows for larger engines (particularly straight-six, V8, and V12) to be used.

Some American luxury cars during the 1970s through the 1990s switched to a front-wheel drive layout with a transverse engine provoked by the Arab Oil Embargo of 1973 and the 1979 oil crisis, which caused automakers to discontinue many FR platforms in favor of the more economical front-wheel drive (FF) layout. From the early 2000s, several of these American luxury cars reverted to FR layouts.

Since the introduction of the Bentley Continental GT in 2003, additional luxury grand tourers have adopted all-wheel drive.

== History ==
=== European manufacturers ===
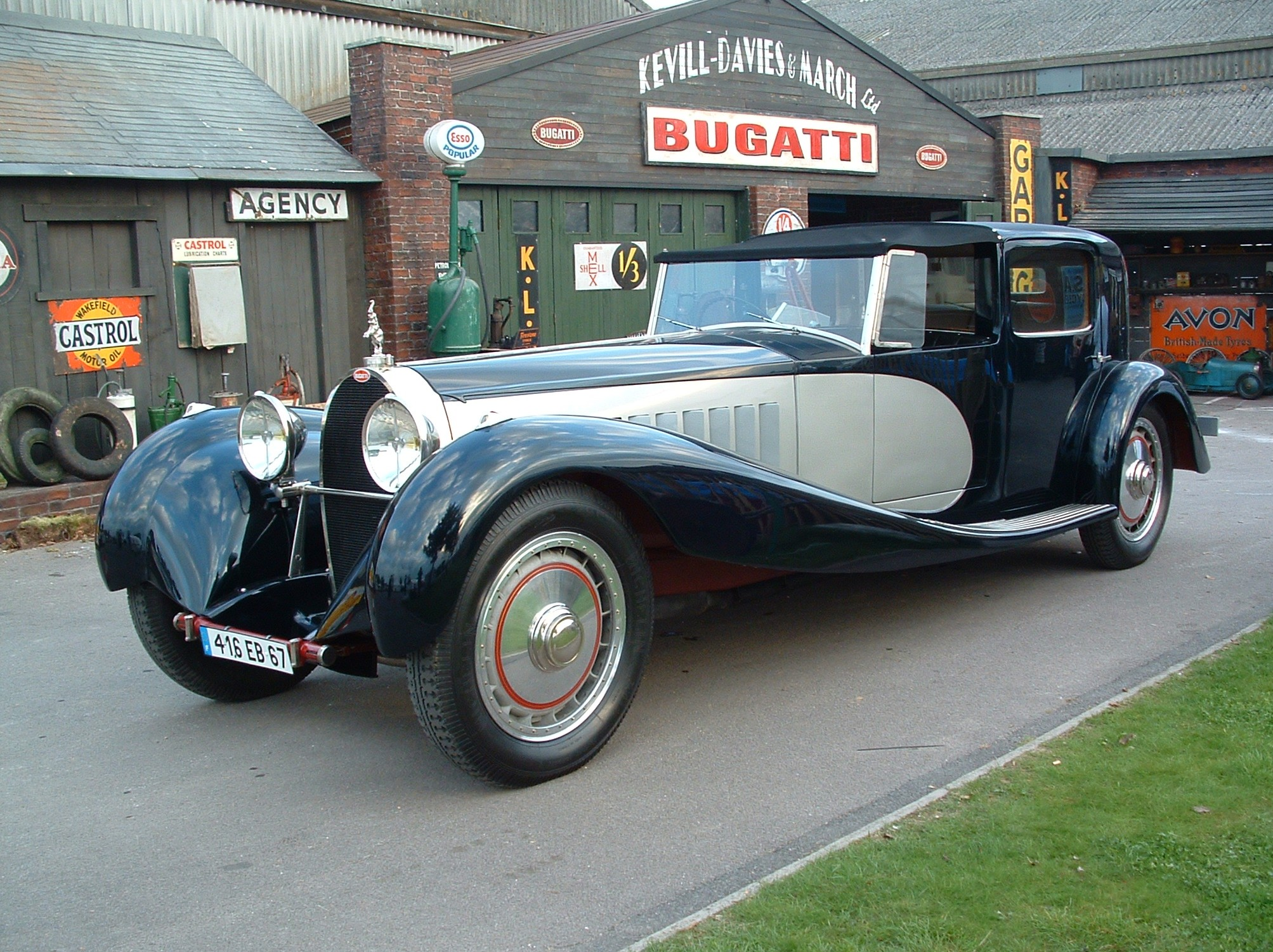
Bugatti Royale (1927–1933)

Before World War II, a wide array of European producers made luxury cars, including Rolls-Royce, Bugatti, Delage, Delahaye, Talbot-Lago, Bentley, Alvis, Avions Voisin, Isotta Fraschini, Horch, Simson, Stoewer, Maybach, Mercedes-Benz, Hispano Suiza, Daimler Company, and Spyker.

France was a leading producer of powerful luxury automobiles before World War II. After World War II, the French government used puissance fiscale tax regulations to encourage manufacturers to build cars with small engines and French motorists to buy them. The Maserati-powered Citroën SM and the Citroën C6 were arguably the last domestic French luxury cars. In the 2010s, some French manufacturers attempted to develop luxury cars; however the lack of a historical legacy hindered these efforts. In 2014, Citroën introduced DS Automobiles sub-brand to market luxury cars.

Pre World War II, intermediate car manufacturers like Renault, Fiat, Opel, Lancia, Škoda, Riley, Praga, Peugeot, Hillman, and Tatra made luxury cars. However, they had to transition to producing economy cars and superminis post-World War II.

Following World War II, Germany emerged as an export powerhouse, building on its success with the Mercedes-Benz brand. Aircraft engine manufacturer BMW began making motorcycles, then assembling small cars, including under license from the Austin Motor Company, and later evolved into the luxury market segment, ultimately acquiring Rolls-Royce Motor Cars in 1998. Volkswagen entered the high-end market by expanding or acquiring additional brands such as Audi, Porsche, Bentley, Lamborghini, and Bugatti.

In the Soviet Union, the manufacturer ZiL (then called Zis) began producing representational limousines in the mid-1930s. In the early 1950s, GAZ joined with the somewhat smaller "Chaika" model range. In 2018, Aurus Motors was established to produce luxury vehicles for the Russian market.

=== North American manufacturers ===
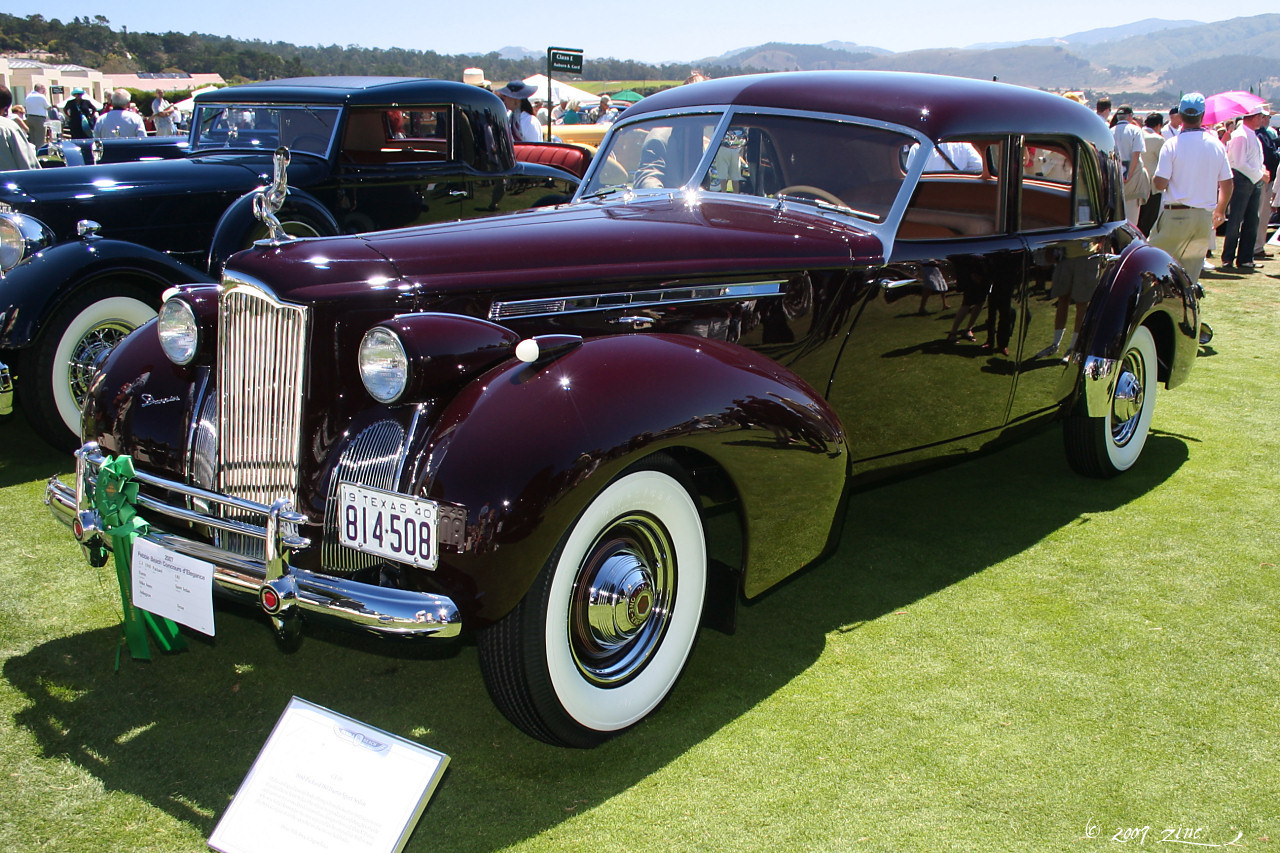
1940 Packard 180 Darrin Sport Sedan

The luxury car phenomenon began at the start of the automobile industry, when the wealthy frequently invested in manufacturing such models to gain social prestige. Emphasis was also placed on custom-built coachwork. The 1920s and 1930s were the apogee of production of these very large luxury automobiles by many manufacturers. Significant North American manufacturers from 1910 until 1940 included Auburn, Buick, Cadillac, Chrysler, Continental, Cord, Daniels, DeSoto, Duesenberg, Franklin, Imperial, LaFayette, LaSalle, Lincoln, Marmon, Packard, Peerless, Pierce Arrow, Ruxton, Stearns-Knight, and Stutz. The Great Depression put many luxury car manufacturers out of business.

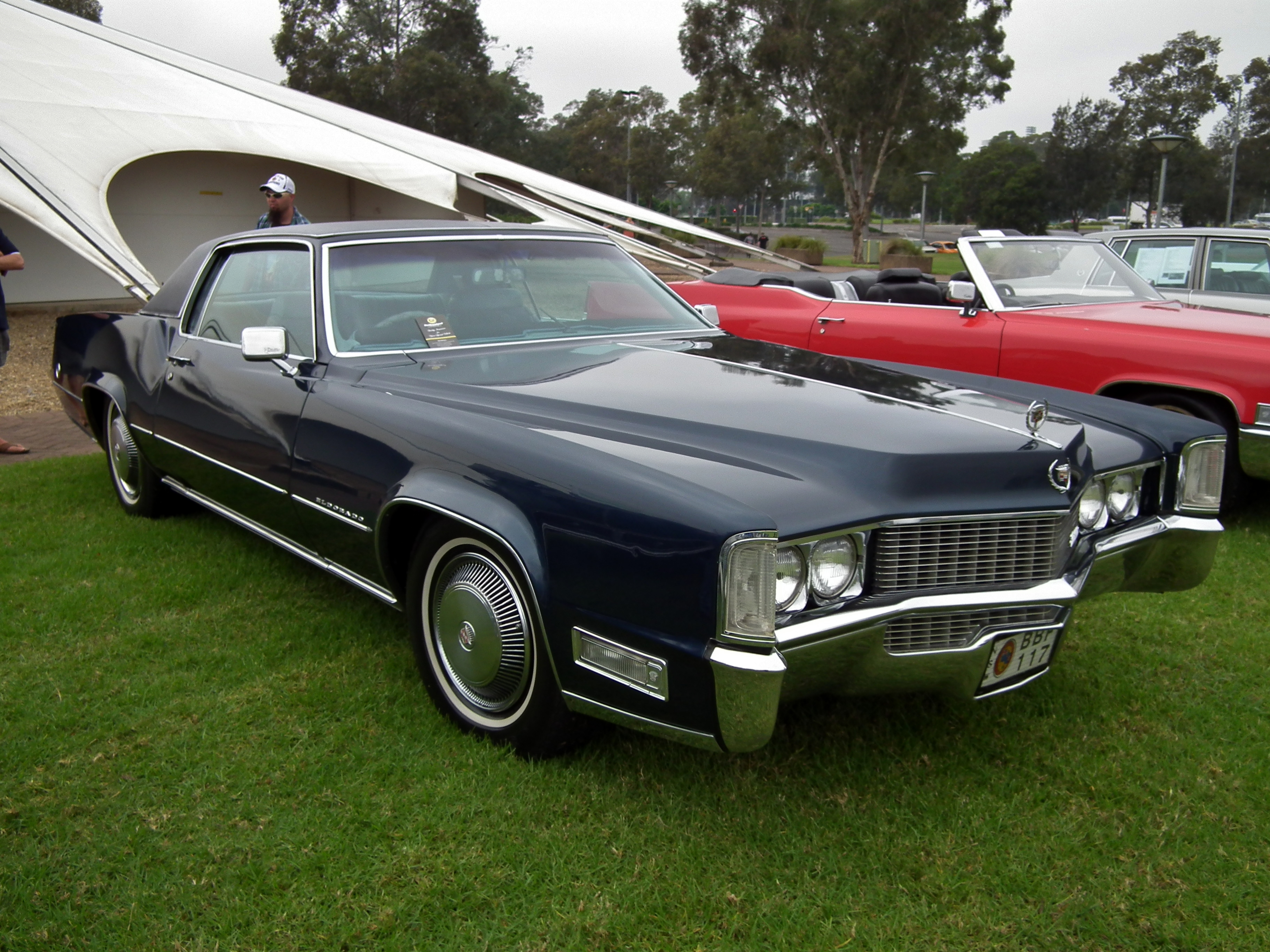
1969 Cadillac Fleetwood Eldorado coupe

From 1946 until the late 1990s, Cadillac was the top-selling brand of luxury cars in the U.S., while Lincoln was second. The most successful and long-running model names during this era were the Cadillac DeVille, Lincoln Continental, and the Chrysler Imperial. The Lincoln Mark Series and Cadillac Eldorado were positioned in the personal luxury category, and competition between them continued into the 1990s.

The personal luxury car emerged into mass popularity and affordability as an America-specific category of popularly-priced cars made from the 1950s by the four domestic manufacturers (GM, Ford, Chrysler, and AMC) that reached peak popularity in the 1970s. The cars were stylized, mass-produced two-door coupés or convertibles, relying on standard components. These distinctively styled cars were targeting the needs of individual customers, not an entire family. The longest running model lines were the 1958-1997 Ford Thunderbird, 1956-1998 Lincoln Mark Series, and the 1967-2002 Cadillac Eldorado.

In 1990, American luxury brands dominated, with Cadillac selling over a quarter of a million cars and Lincoln having its best year ever at 231,660 units. However, the market was changing, with an ever-greater acceptance of smaller, more efficient imported luxury brands. At the same time, the domestic manufacturers were downsizing their models with product decisions that backfired on quality and brand respect.

Since the late 1990s, Japanese and German brands have sold the most luxury-type cars in the United States. However, the Cadillac Escalade has led the luxury SUV segment sales in the United States since its introduction in 1998, with the highest sales for 15 out of its first 20 years on the market.

In the 2000s, both Ford and General Motors produced luxury pickups, including the 2002-2013 Cadillac Escalade EXT, the 2002-2003 Lincoln Blackwood, and the 2006-2014 Lincoln Mark LT. During the late 2000s, the Cadillac CTS and Cadillac DTS led to a resurgence in the brand's luxury sedans. The equivalent sedan from the Ford group, the 2008 Lincoln MKS, was also regarded as a significant improvement over previous models. In 2010, BMW was the best-selling luxury vehicle manufacturer by sales, with Audi and Mercedes-Benz the second and third highest selling luxury brands.

=== East Asian manufacturers ===
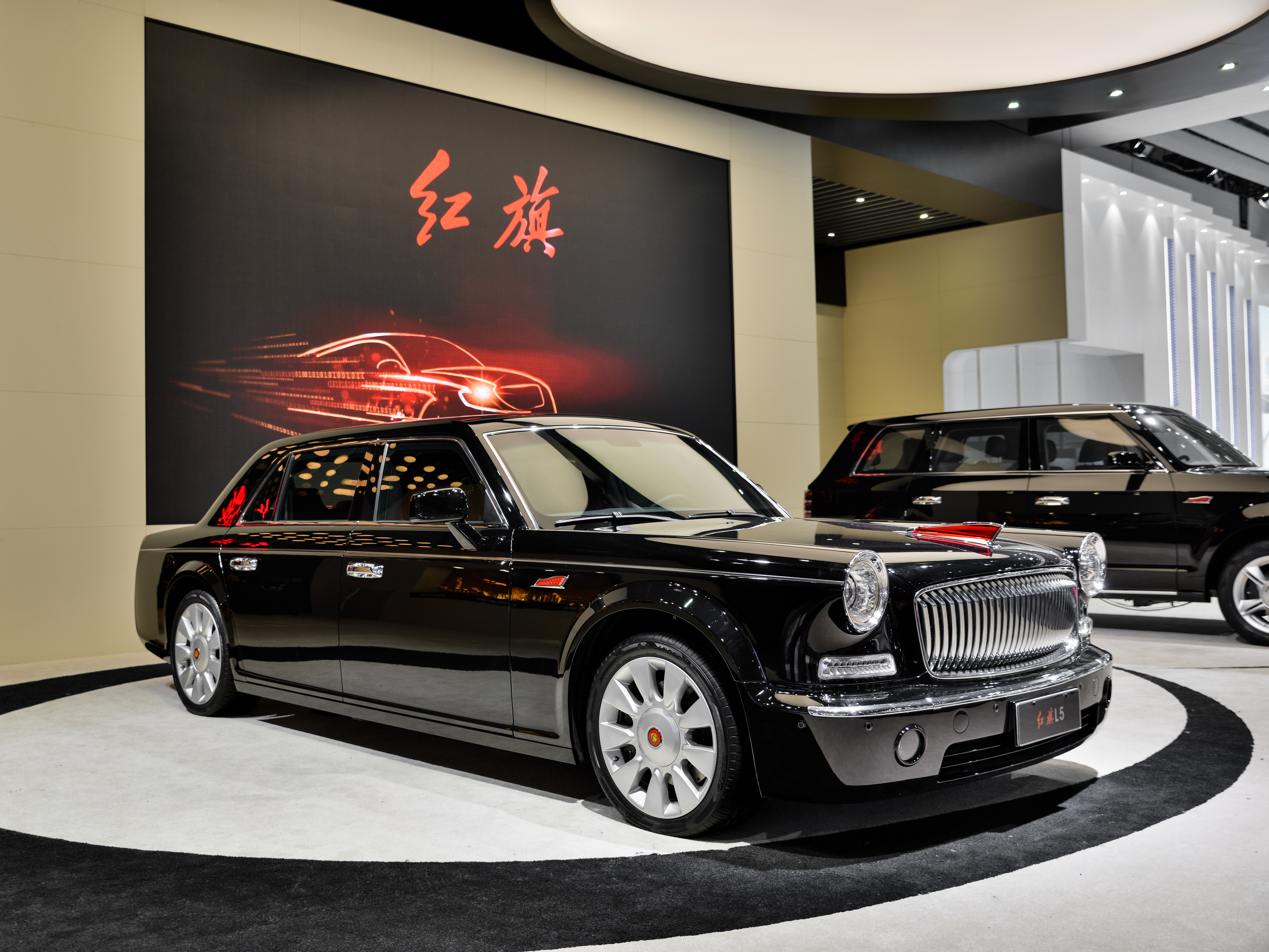
Hongqi L5

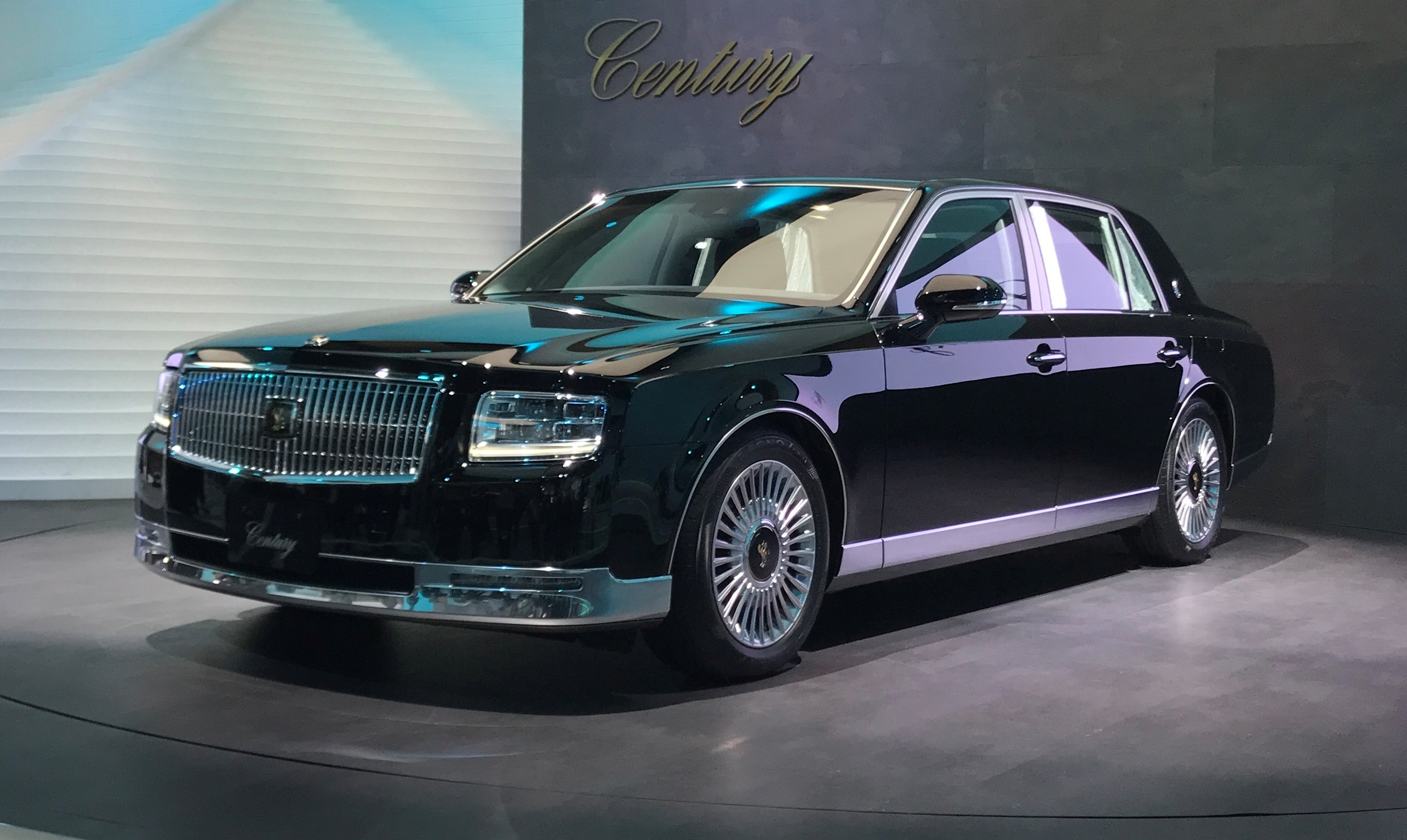
Toyota Century

Chinese manufacturer Hongqi was founded in 1958, making it the oldest Chinese luxury car marque. Later entrants emerged, taking advantage of the rise of electric powertrains, with NEV brands such as Nio in 2014, Lynk & Co in 2016, HiPhi in 2019, Zeekr in 2021, and Yangwang in 2023 producing luxury electric and hybrid vehicles.

Japanese manufacturers have been producing luxury cars since the 1950s, including the Toyota Crown (1955–present), Prince/Nissan Gloria (1959–2004), Nissan Cedric (1960–2015), Mitsubishi Debonair (1964–1998), Nissan President (1965–2010), Toyota Century (1967–present), Mazda Luce/929 (1969–1991), and Honda Legend (1985–2021).

Since the 1980s, overseas sales of Japanese luxury cars have increased, thereby challenging traditional European luxury brands.

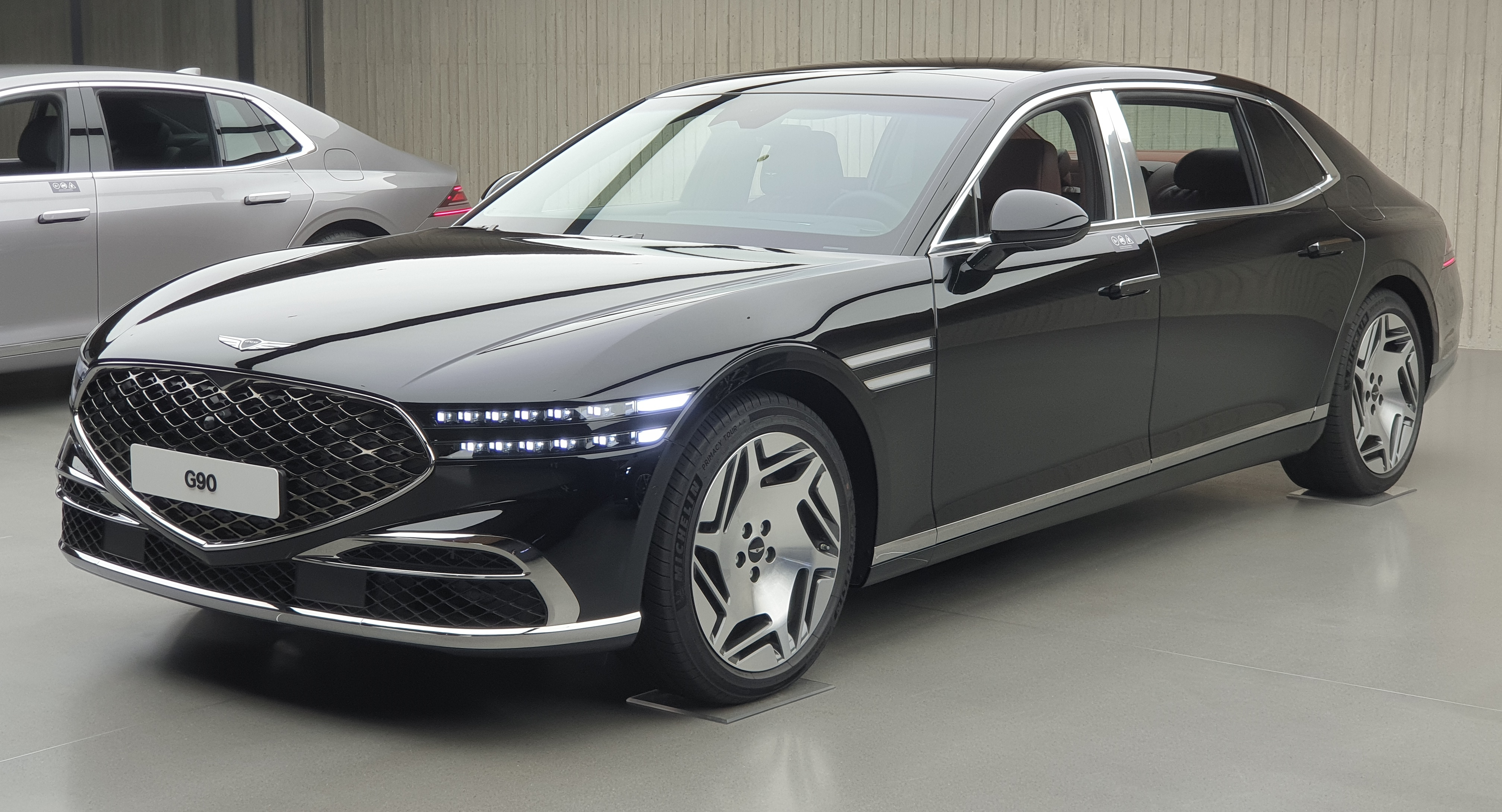
Genesis G90

Several East Asian manufacturers have created sub-brands to market luxury cars. The first of these was the 1986 launch of Acura (a Honda sub-brand), followed by Lexus (Toyota) in 1989, Infiniti (Nissan) in 1989, and Genesis (Hyundai) in 2015.

=== 2008 financial crisis and the Great Recession ===
The 2008 financial crisis and the Great Recession marked the first time since the Great Depression that the luxury car market suffered considerably, something not seen in previous economic downturns. Many such customers saw their net worth decline during this time. For example, some of the steepest drop-offs came at the high end, including the BMW 7 Series and Rolls-Royce Phantom, and in 2010, Mercedes-Benz dropped the price of the W212 E-Class. The unusually sharp decline in luxury car sales has led observers to believe that there is a fundamental shift and reshaping of the luxury automotive market, with one industry official suggesting that the marques no longer command the premiums that they used to and another saying that conspicuous consumption was no longer attractive in poor economic conditions. Additionally, mainstream brands have been able to offer amenities and devices such as leather, wood, and anti-lock brakes, previously found only on luxury cars, as the costs decline.

However, luxury vehicle sales remained relatively high compared to their non-luxury counterparts. This was aided by growing interest in luxury vehicles from emerging markets such as China and Russia.

Sales in the entry-level luxury segment remained strong throughout the GFC, due to prices being lowered to compete with well-equipped non-luxury cars. For example, in Canada, several luxury manufacturers set sales records in August 2009, due mostly to discounted pricing on entry-level luxury vehicles.

== Brands ==
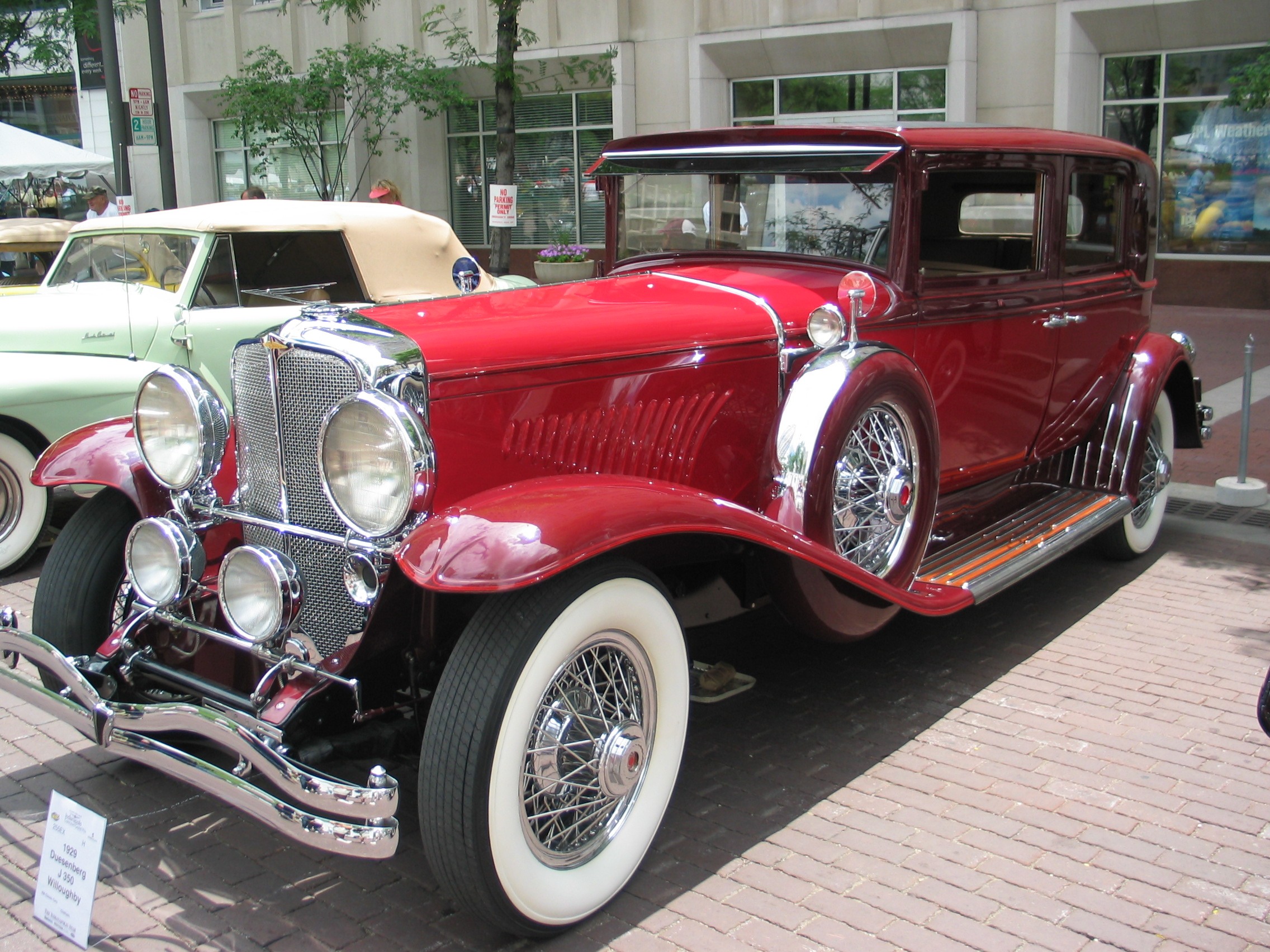
1929 Duesenberg, "one of the great luxury cars" with custom body by Willoughby

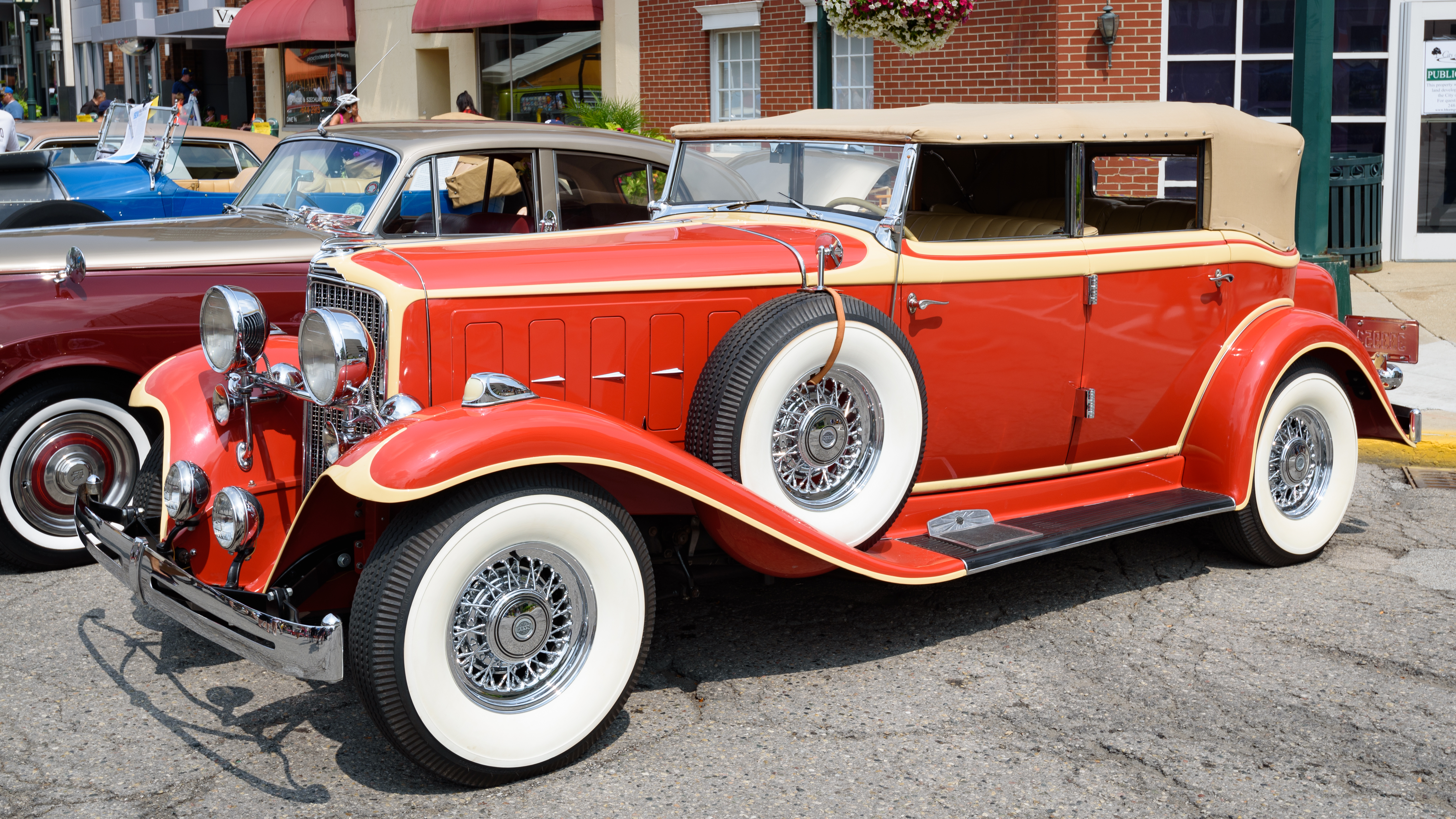
1932 Nash Ambassador 8 Convertible Sedan, characterized as "the Duesenberg from Kenosha"

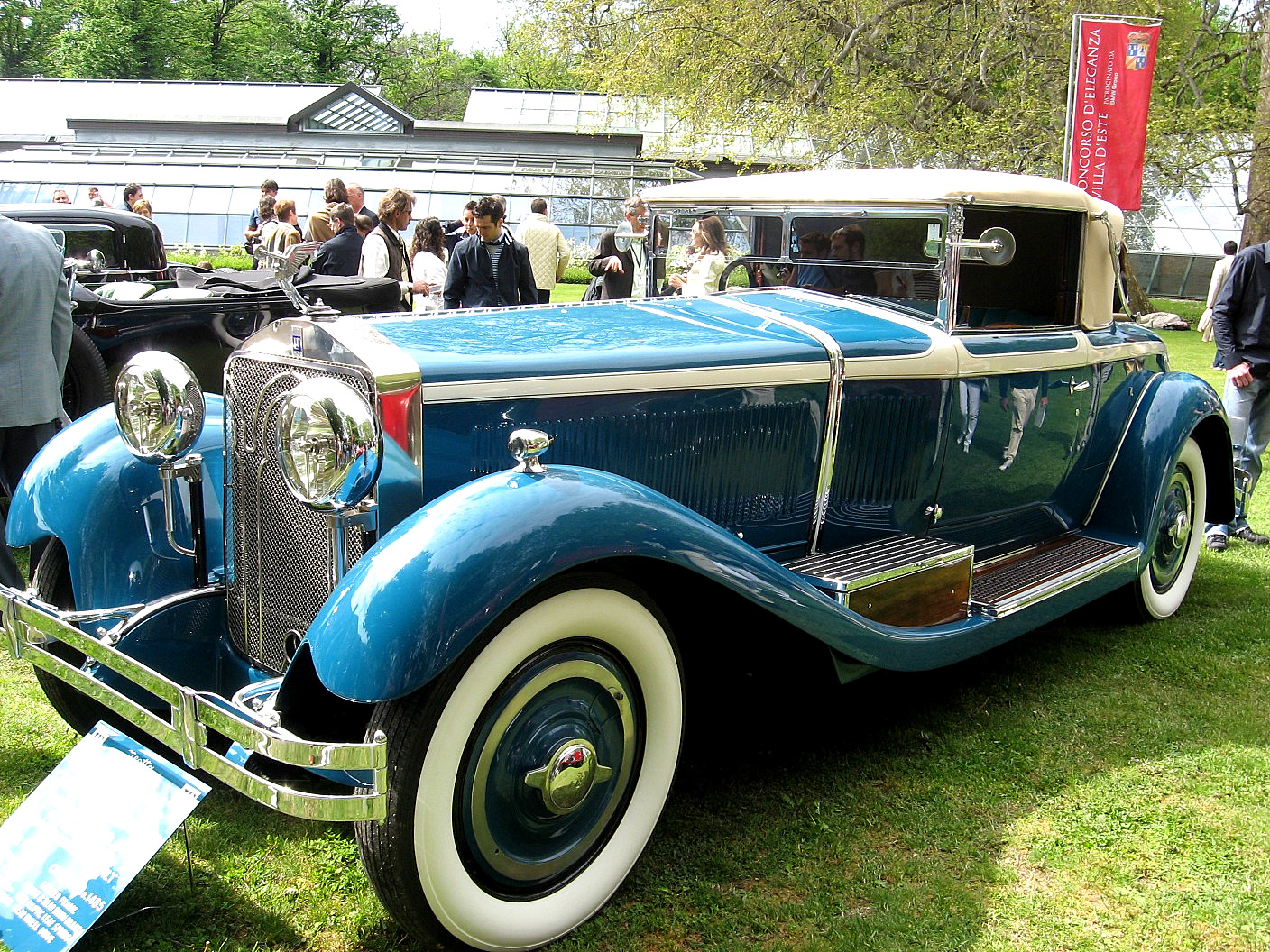
A 1930s Italian Isotta Fraschini Tipo 8A S LeBaron Boattail Roadster

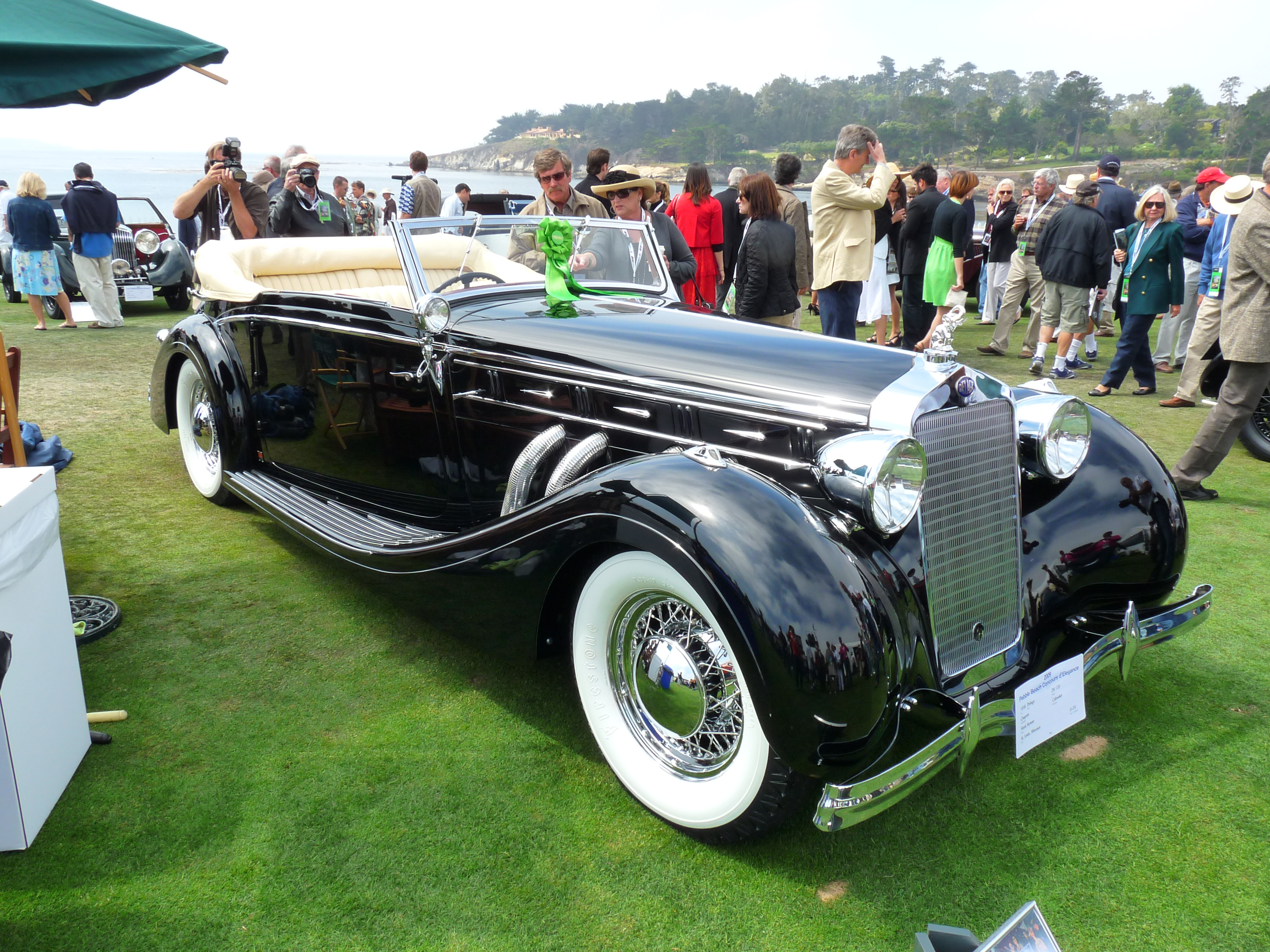
1936 Delage D8 120 Chapron Cabriolet

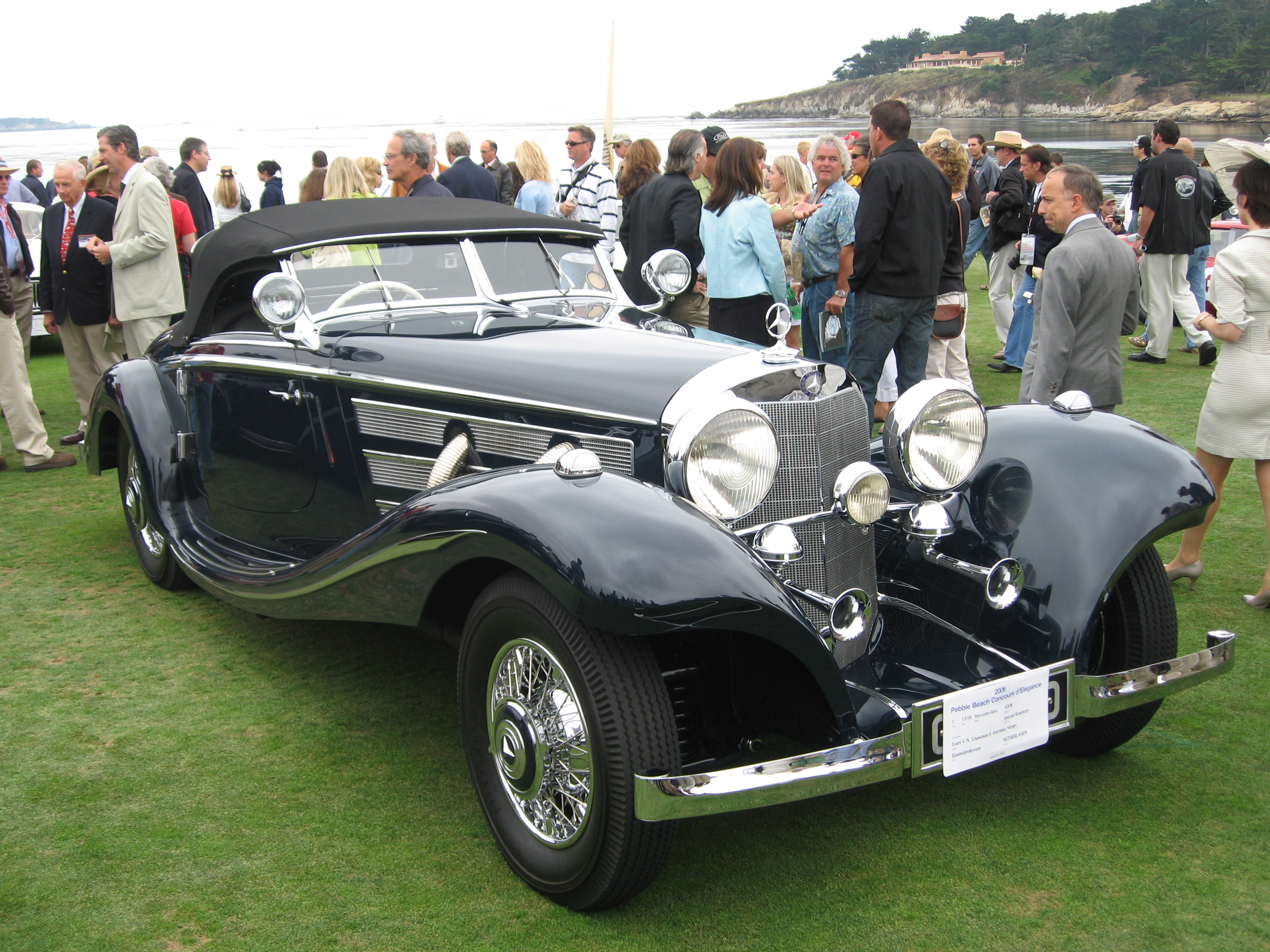
1936 Mercedes-Benz 500K Spezial-Roadster

Some auto manufacturers market their luxury models using the same marque as the rest of their line. Others have created a separate marque (e.g., Lexus, launched by Toyota in 1989) or purchased one (e.g., Bentley, by Volkswagen in 1998).

Occasionally, a luxury car is initially sold under a mainstream marque and is later rebranded under a specific luxury marque (for example, the Hyundai Genesis to Genesis G80 as well as the Citroën DS to DS 5).

For mass-produced luxury cars, sharing platforms or components with other models is common, as is the case in modern automotive industry practice.

Holding company	Luxury vehicle brands
Aston Martin	Aston Martin, Lagonda
Auburn	Duesenberg, Cord, Auburn
BMW	BMW, Rolls-Royce, Alpina
BYD	Denza, Yangwang
Changan	Avatr
Chery	Exeed, Jetour Zongheng, Luxeed
Chrysler Corporation	Imperial, Chrysler, DeSoto, Jeep
Dongfeng Motor Corporation	Voyah, M-Hero (Mengshi)
Dorcen	Dorcen
FAW Group	Hongqi
Ferrari N.V.	Ferrari
Ford Motor Company	Lincoln, Continental, Mercury
GAC Group	Hyptec
Geely	Volvo Cars, Lynk & Co, Polestar, Lotus, Zeekr, Jidu Auto
General Motors	Cadillac, LaSalle, Buick, Oldsmobile
Great Wall Motors	WEY, Tank
Hispano-Suiza	Hispano-Suiza
Honda	Acura
Hudson Motor Company	Greater Eight, Italia
Human Horizons	HiPhi
Hyundai	Genesis Motor
Ideal Team Ventures	Apollo, De Tomaso
JAC Group	Maextro
Kaiser-Frazer	Frazer
Karma Automotive	Karma
Li Auto	Li Auto
Lucid Motors	Lucid Motors
McLaren	McLaren
Mahindra	Automobili Pininfarina
Mercedes-Benz Group	Mercedes-Benz, Maybach
Nash Motor Company	Ambassador, Nash-Healey
NAMI	Aurus
Nio	Nio
Renault–Nissan–Mitsubishi Alliance	Infiniti
Rivian	Rivian
SAIC Motor	IM
Seres	AITO
Stellantis	Maserati, Lancia, DS, Alfa Romeo
Studebaker	Packard
Tata Motors	Jaguar Cars, Land Rover, Daimler, Lanchester
Toyota	Lexus, Century, Crown
TVR Electric Vehicles Limited	TVR
Volkswagen Group	Audi, Bentley, Porsche, Lamborghini
Wanxiang	Karma Automotive
Weltmeister	Weltmeister

== Market categories ==
=== Subcompact executive / premium compact ===
The premium compact class is the category of the smallest luxury cars. It became popular in the mid-2000s, when European manufacturers (such as Audi, Volvo, BMW, and Mercedes-Benz) introduced new entry-level models that were smaller and cheaper than their compact executive models. The premium compact cars are usually based on the platform of a compact car (also known as "small family car" or C-segment). At the same time, some models may be based on a subcompact car (also known as a supermini or B-segment).

Examples include the Mercedes-Benz A-Class and CLA-Class, Audi A3, Volvo S40, BMW 1 Series, and 2 Series. Premium compacts compete with well-equipped mid-size cars, and highly optioned premium compact cars can have pricing and features that overlap models in the compact executive segment.

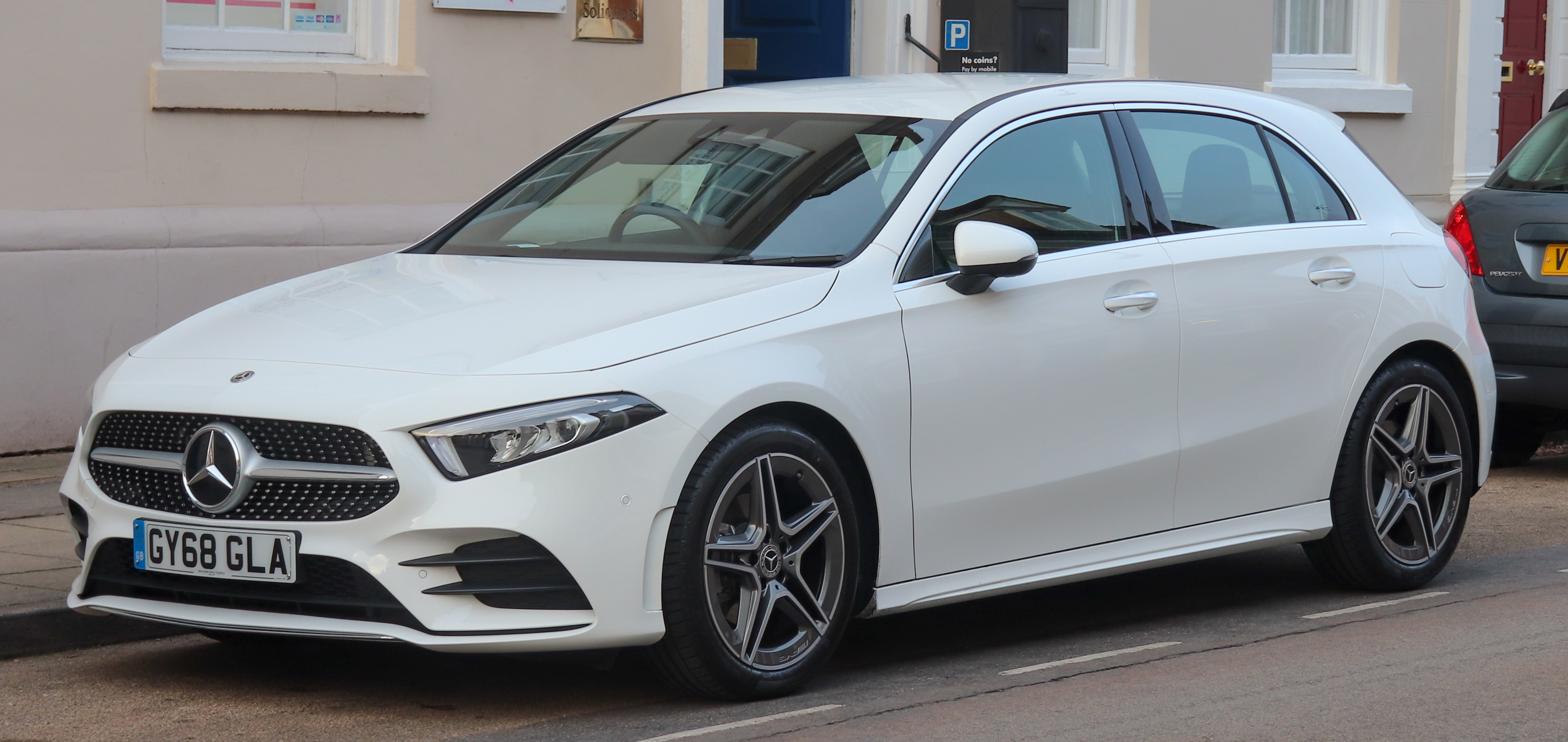
Mercedes-Benz A-Class hatchback (2018–present)

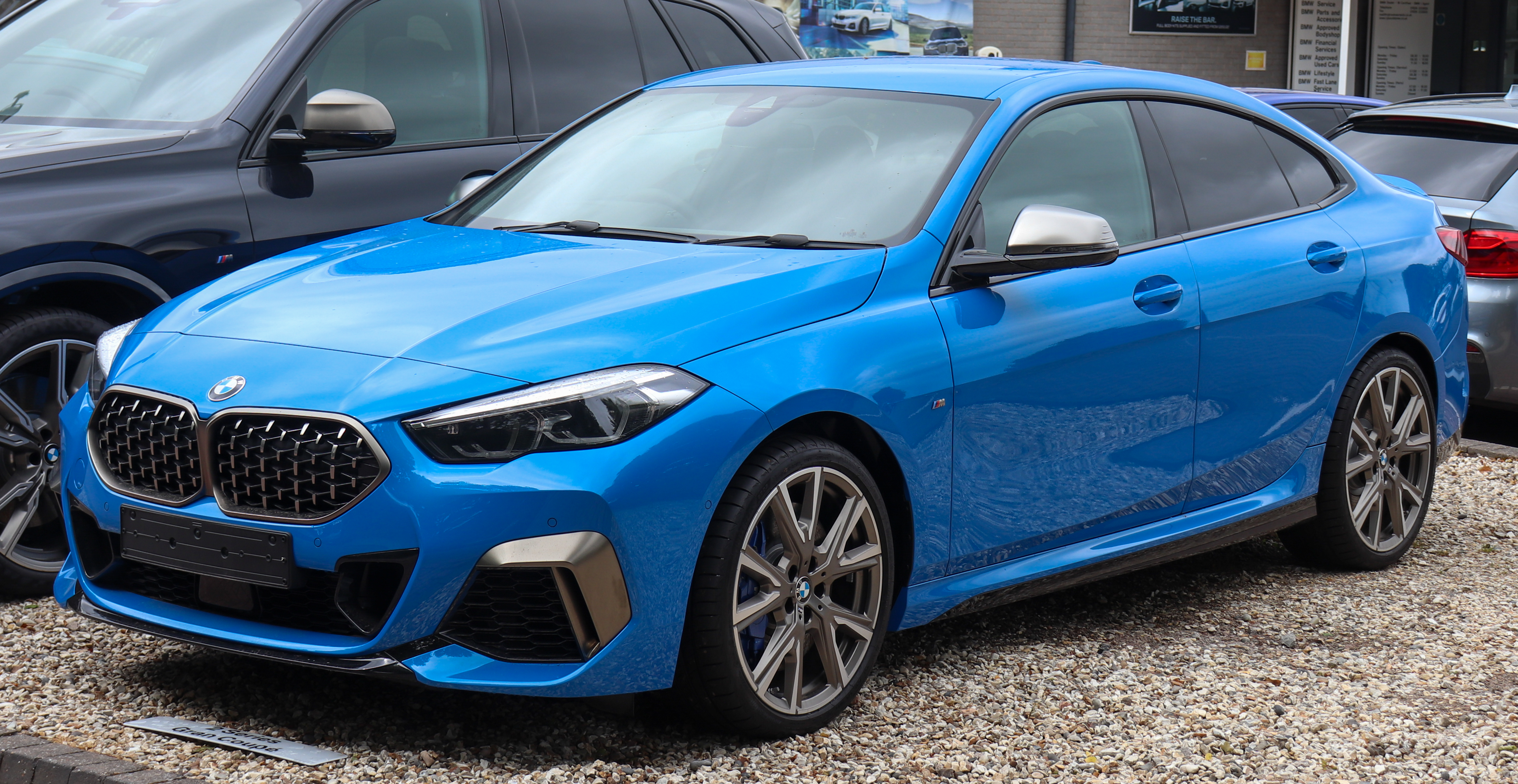
BMW 2 Series Gran Coupé (2019–present)

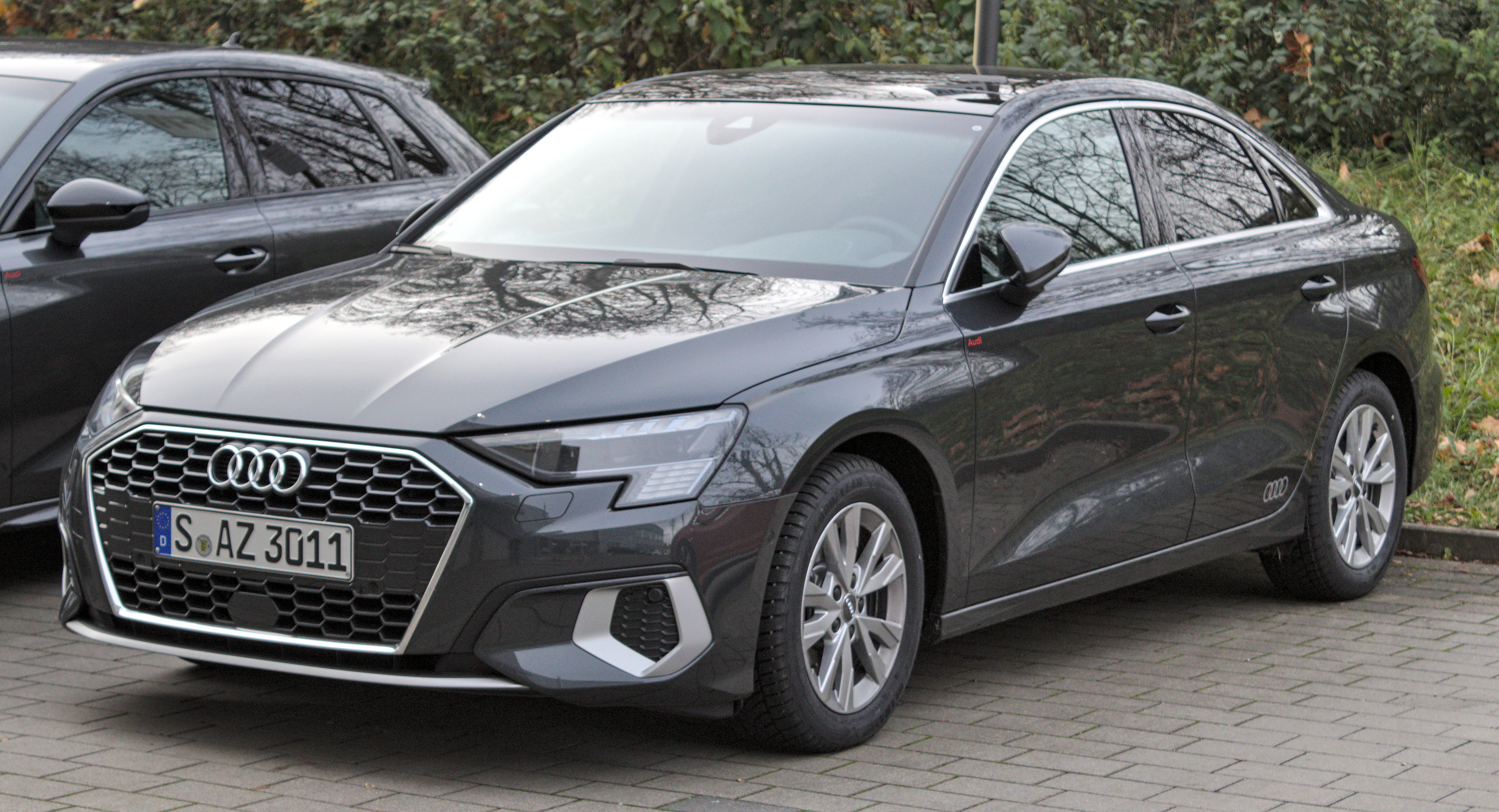
Audi A3 sedan (2020–present)

=== Compact executive / compact luxury ===
A compact executive car or a compact luxury car is a premium car larger than a premium compact and smaller than an executive car. In European classification, compact executive cars are part of the D-segment. In North American terms, close equivalents are "compact premium car", "compact luxury car", "entry-level luxury car" and "near-luxury car". Compact executive cars are usually based on the platform of a mid-size car (also known as large family car or D-segment), while some models may be based on a compact car (also known as small family car or C-segment).

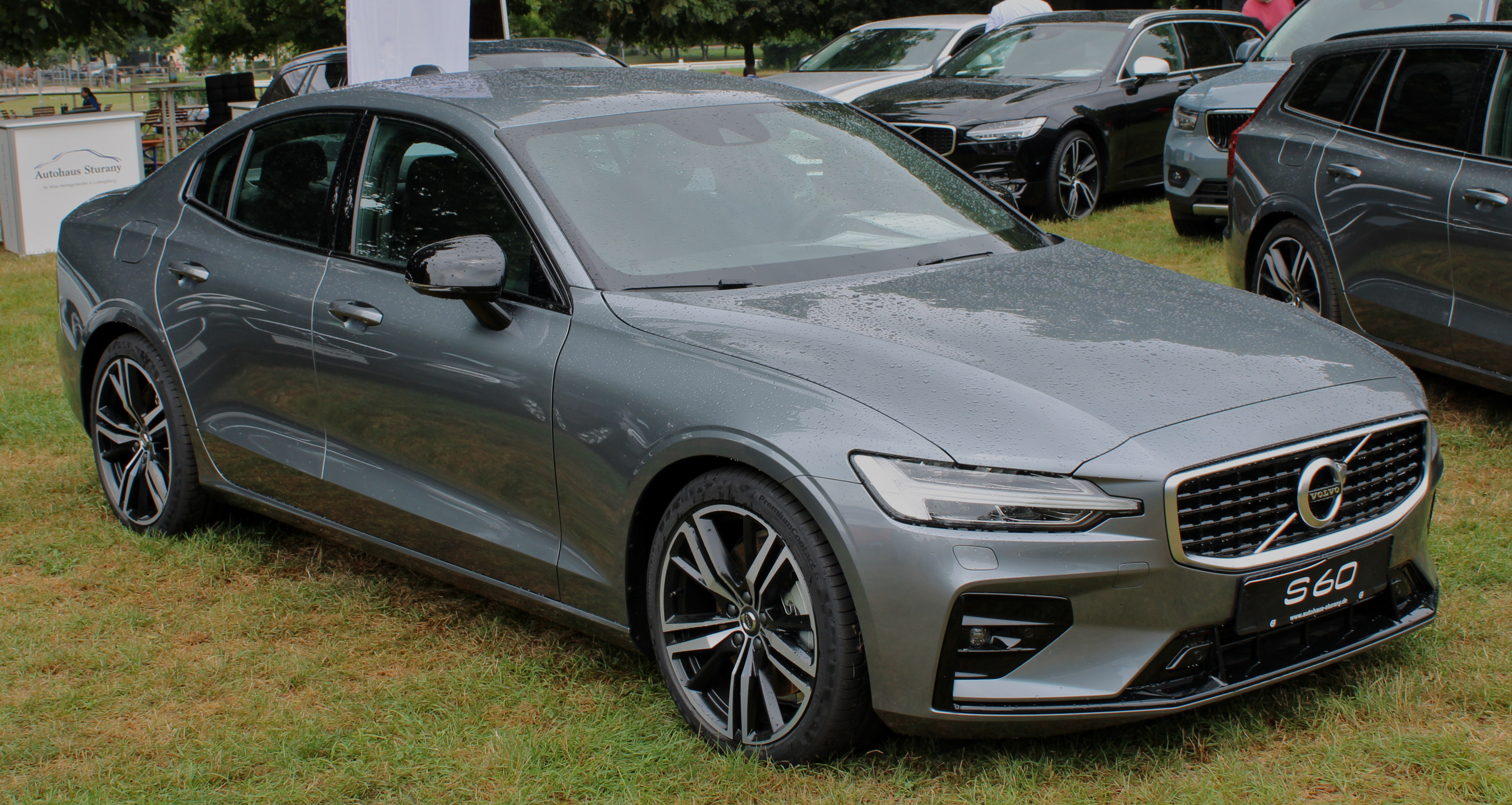
Volvo S60

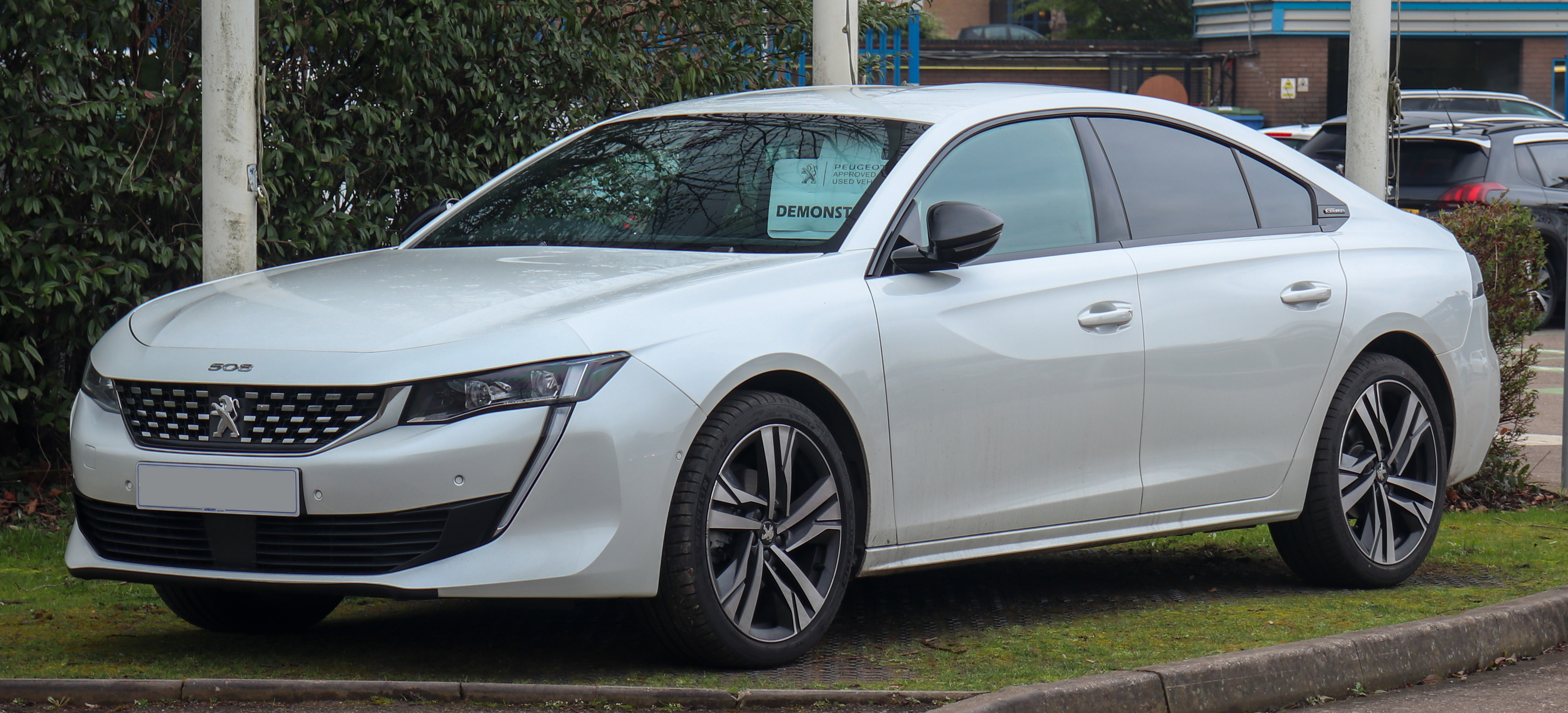
Peugeot 508

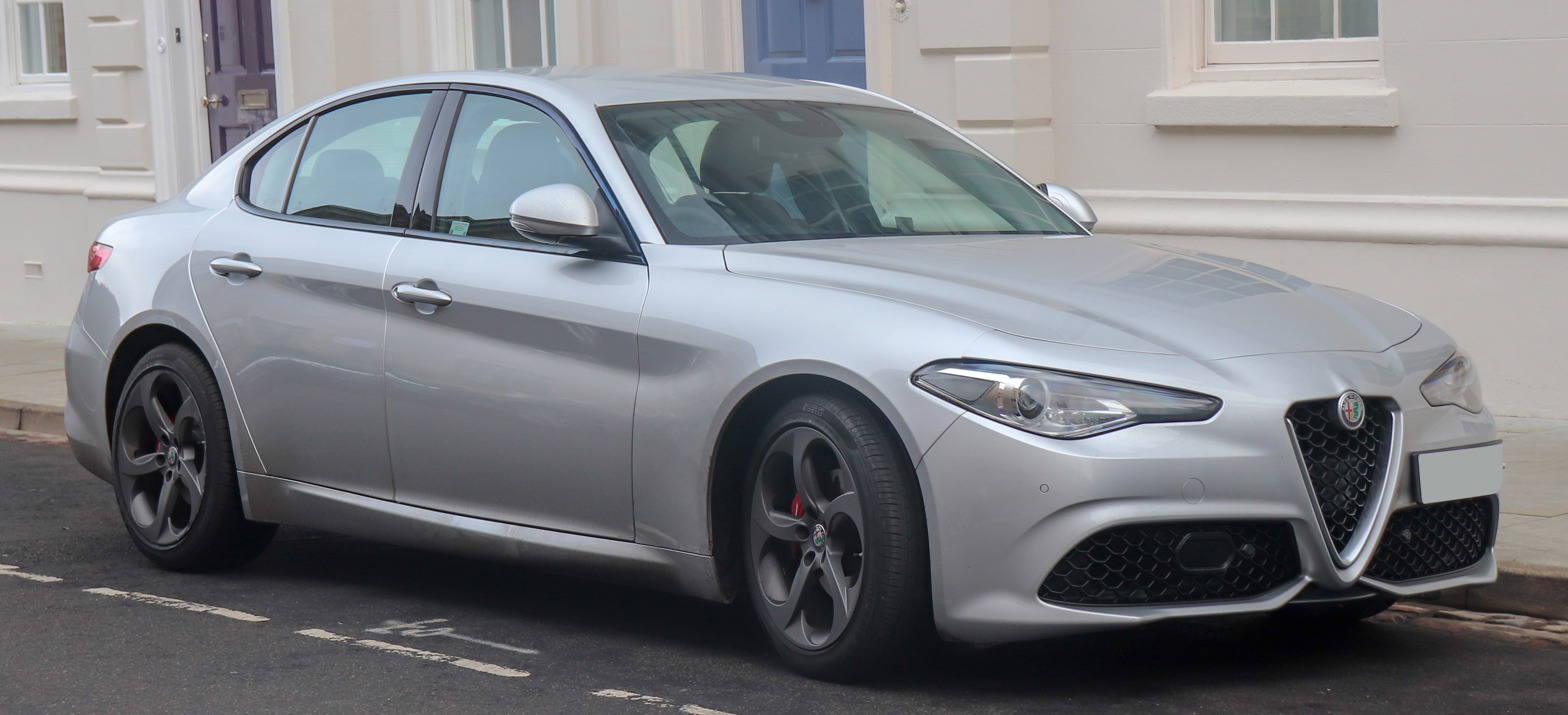
Alfa Romeo Giulia

=== Executive / mid-size luxury ===
Executive car is a British term for an automobile larger than a large family car. In official use, the term is adopted by Euro NCAP, a European organization founded to test for car safety. It is a passenger car classification defined by the European Commission.

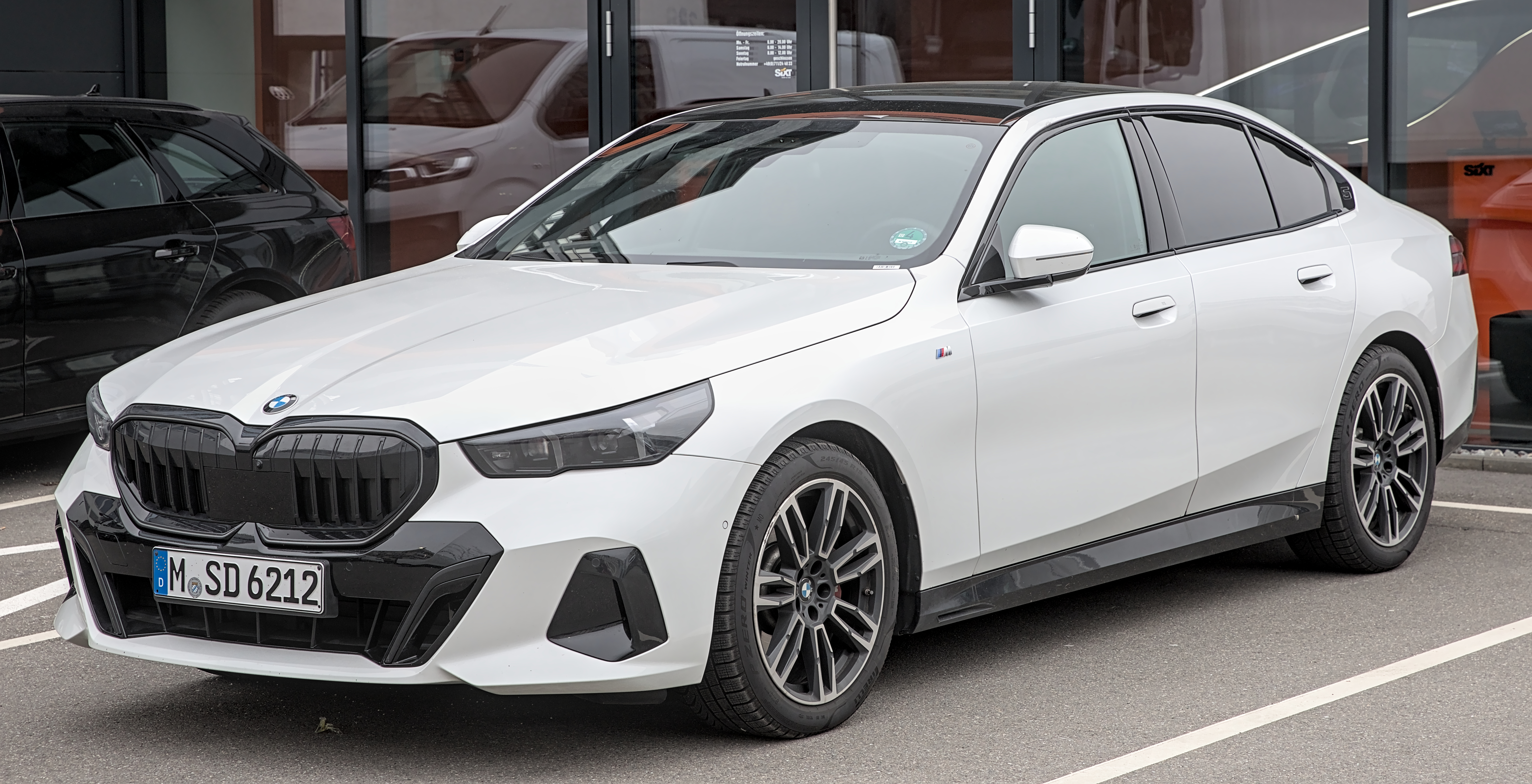
BMW 5 Series

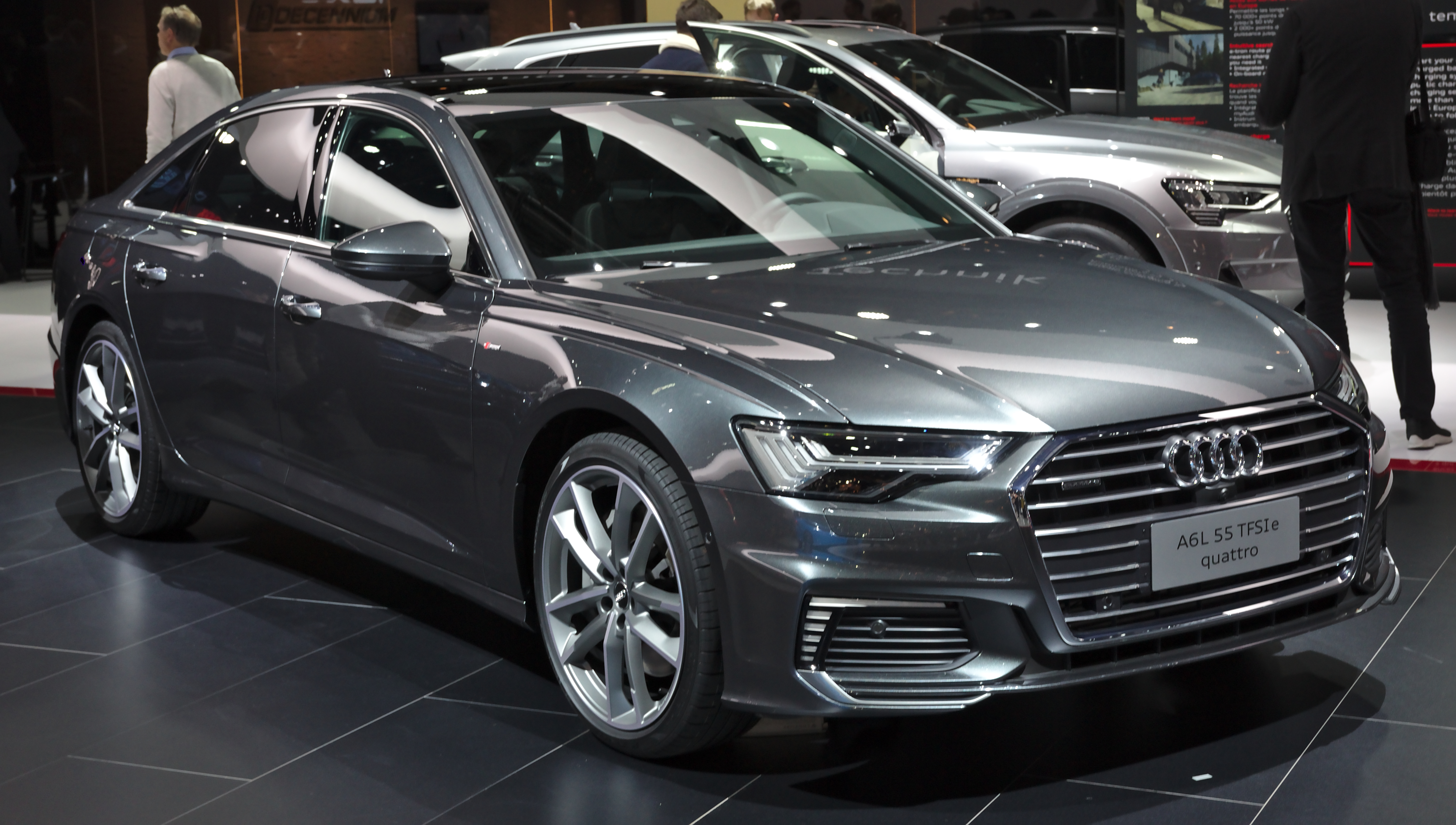
Audi A6

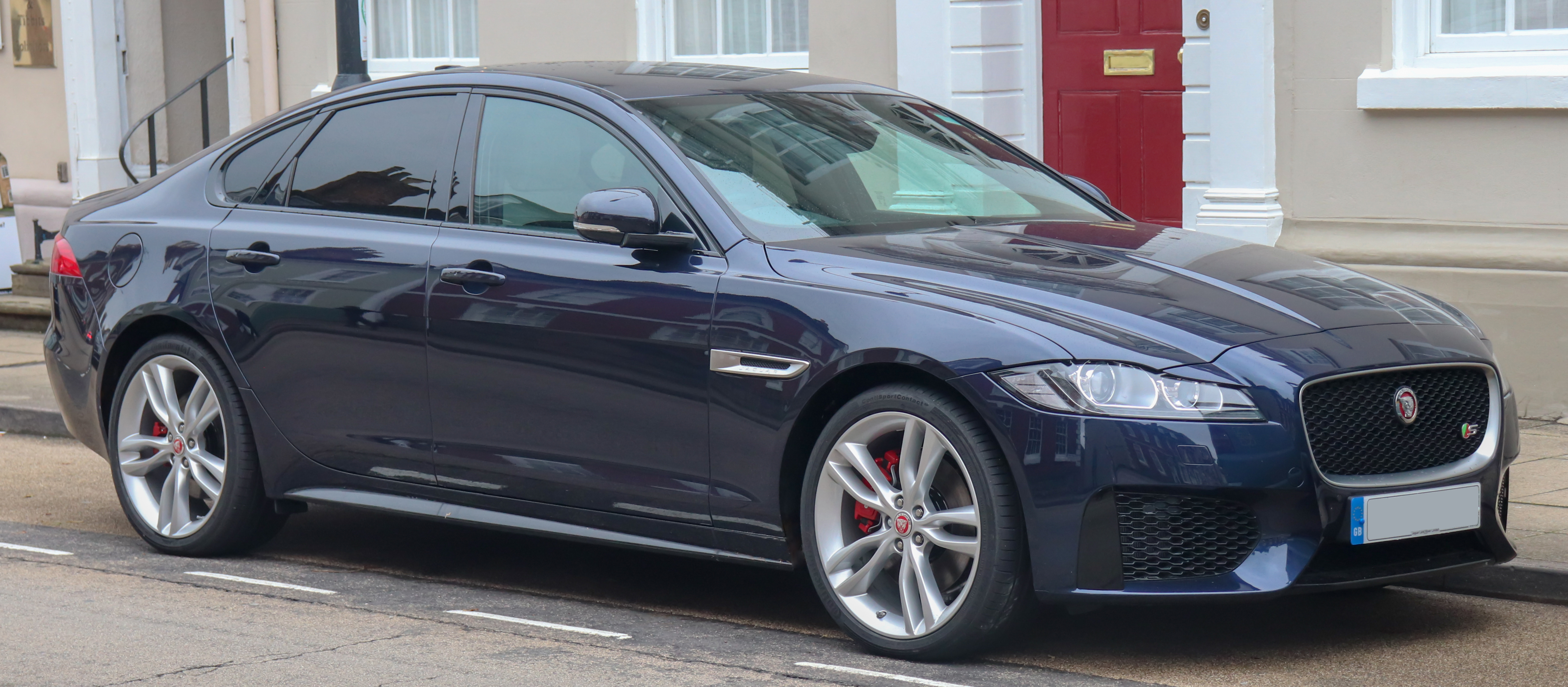
Jaguar XF

=== Luxury saloon / full-size luxury sedan ===
The next category of luxury cars is known in Great Britain as a "luxury saloon" or "luxury limousine," and is known in the United States as a full-size luxury sedan, large luxury sedan, or flagship sedan. It is the equivalent of the European F-segment and the German Oberklasse segment.

Many of these luxury saloons are the flagship for the marque and include the newest automotive technology. Several models are available in long-wheelbase versions, which provide additional rear legroom and may have a higher level of standard features.

Examples of luxury saloons / full-size luxury sedans include the BMW 7 Series, Jaguar XJ, Cadillac CT6, Genesis G90, Audi A8, Mercedes-Benz S-Class, Lexus LS,Hongqi L1, Porsche Panamera, and Maserati Quattroporte.

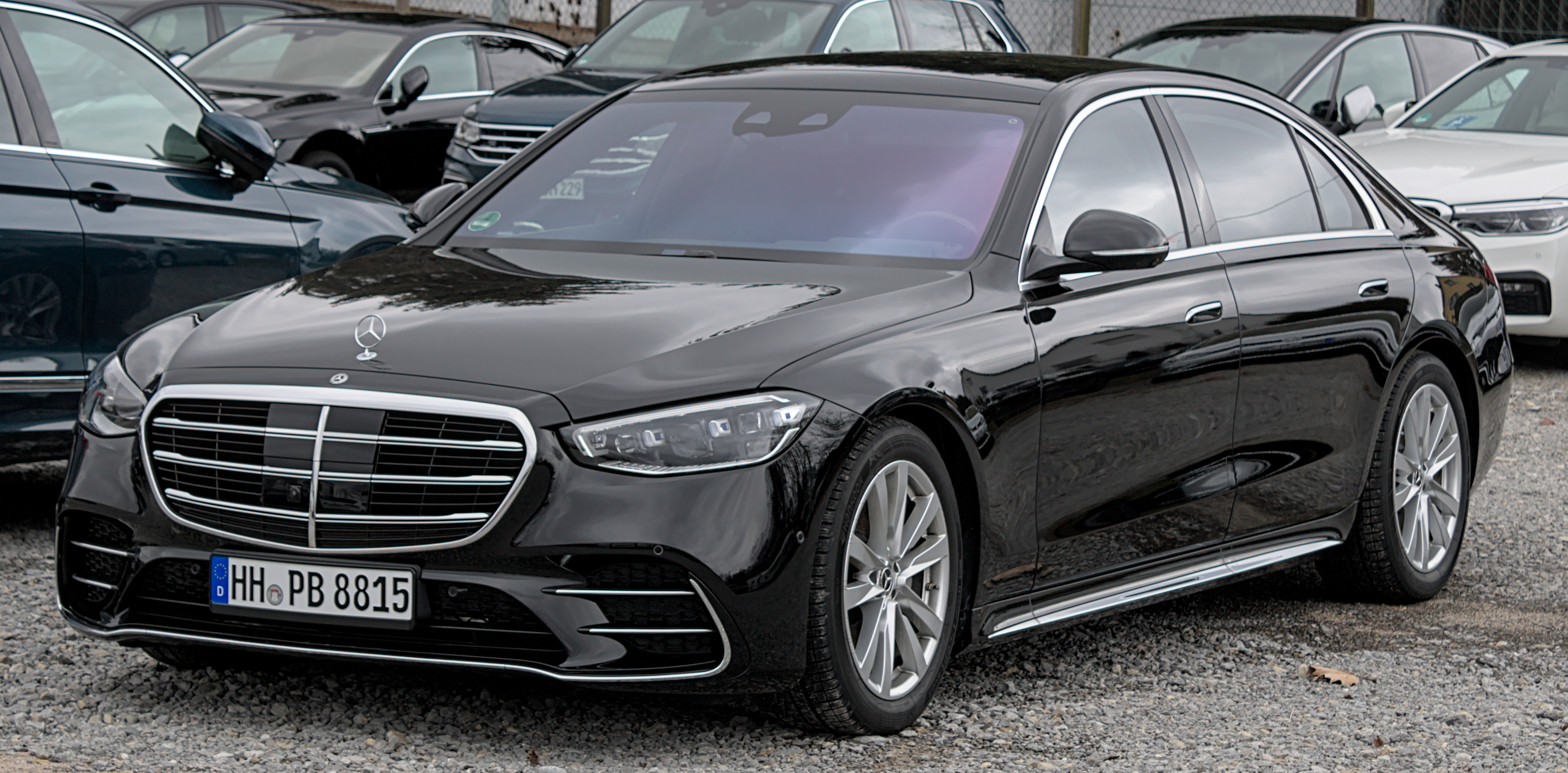
Mercedes-Benz S-Class

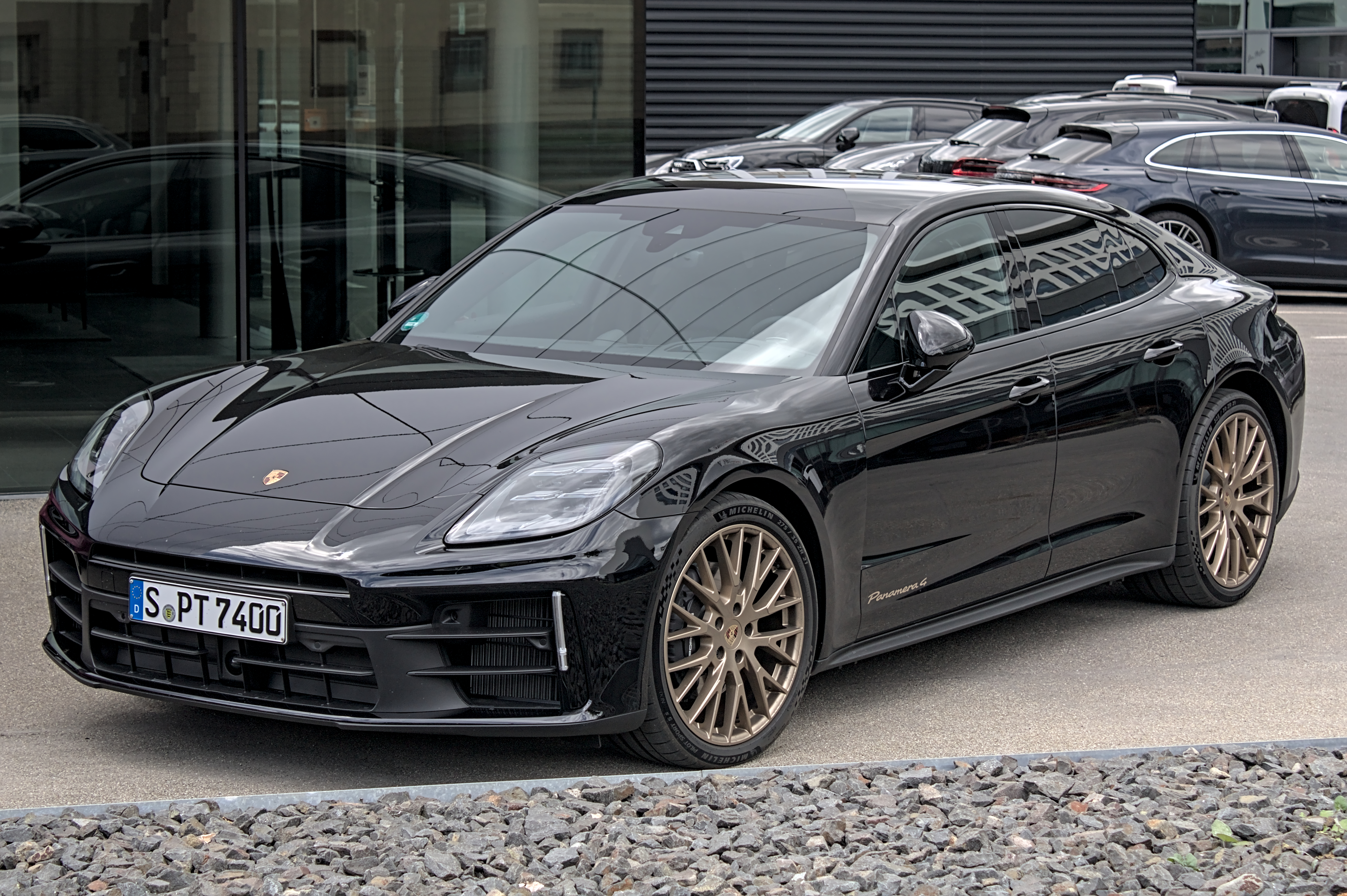
Porsche Panamera

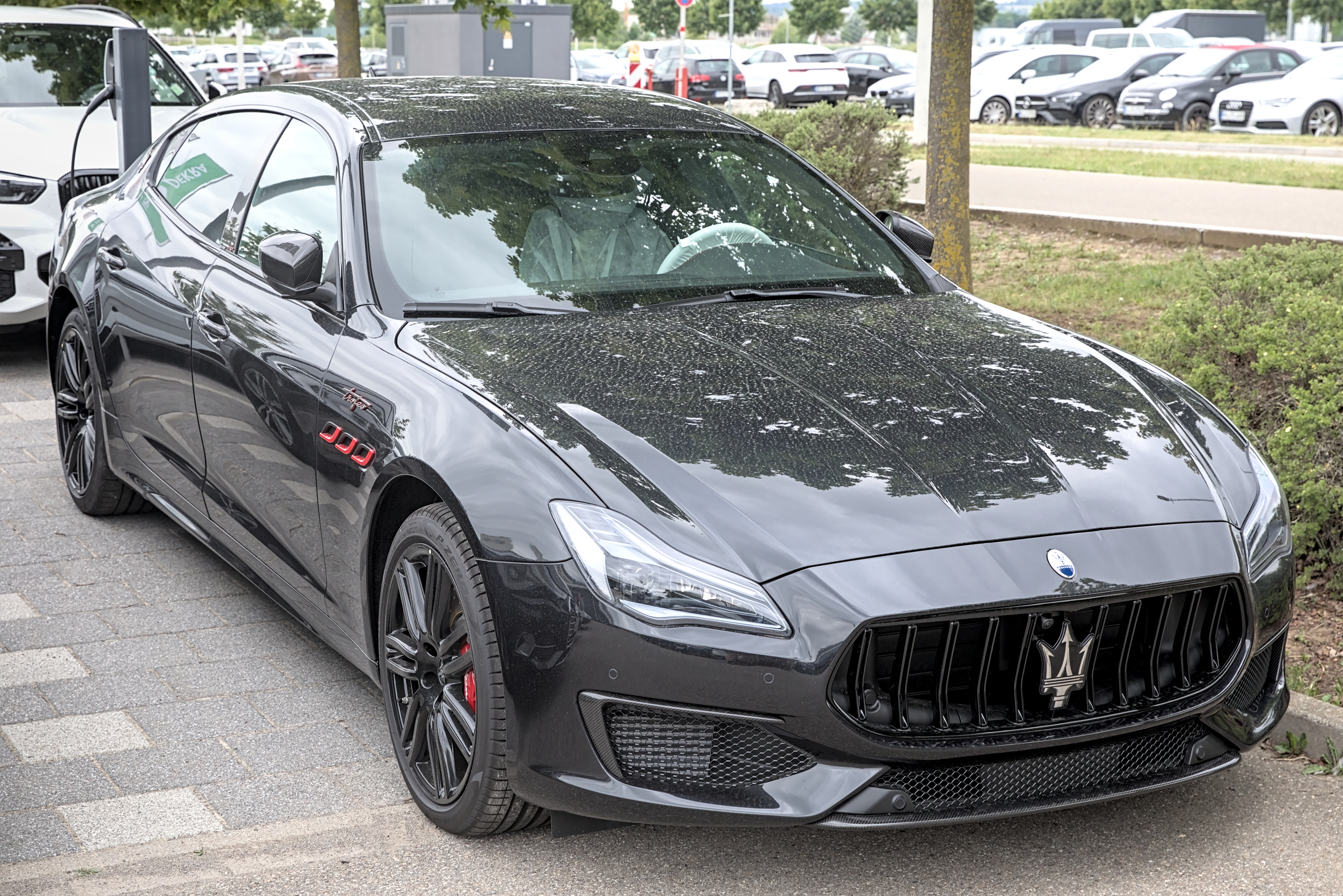
Maserati Quattroporte

=== Grand tourer ===
Grand tourers are essentially high-performance luxury vehicles. These vehicles are generally two-door coupes and are made for long-distance driving, combined with the luxury of an executive car or full-size luxury car.

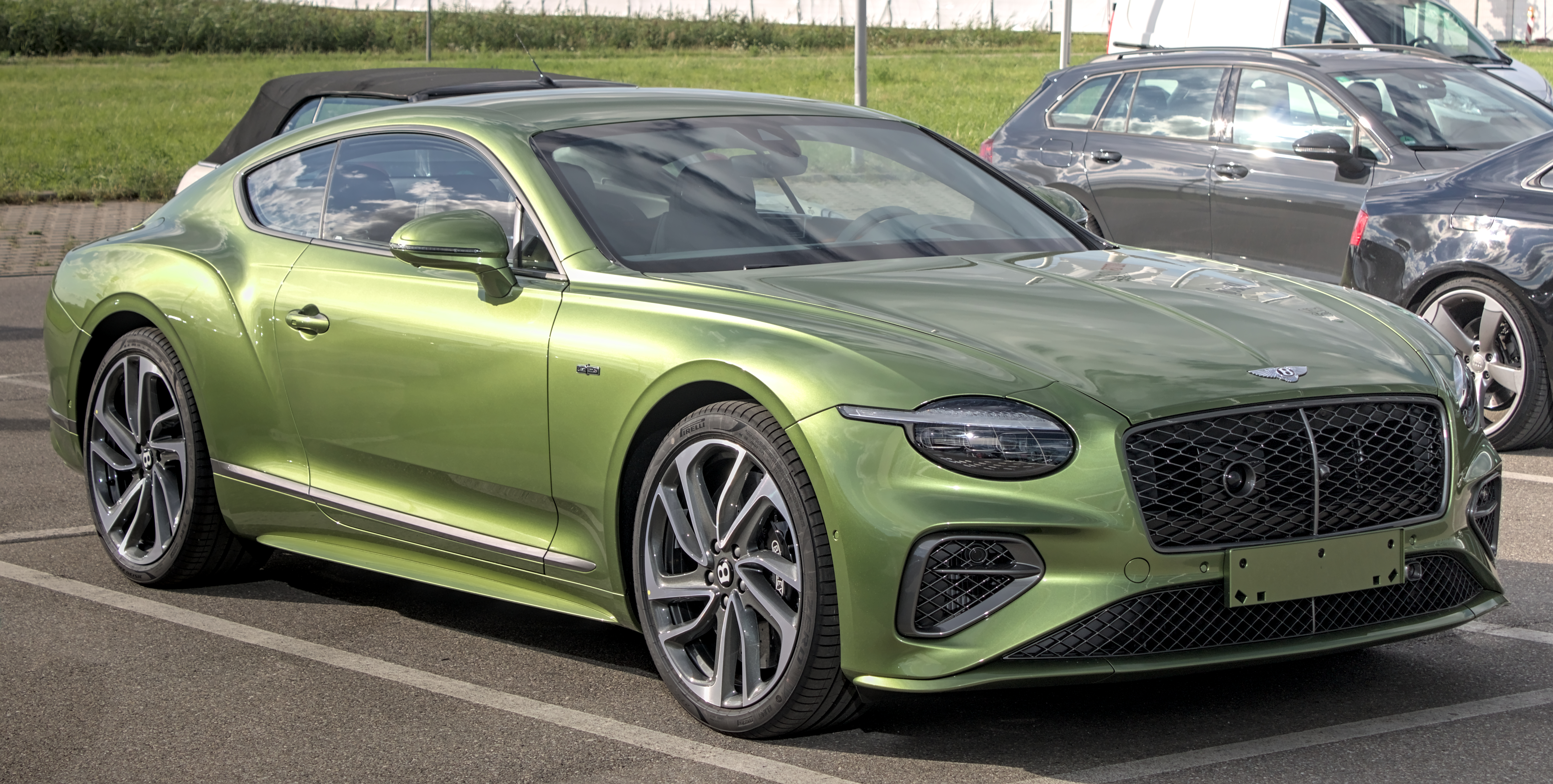
Bentley Continental GT

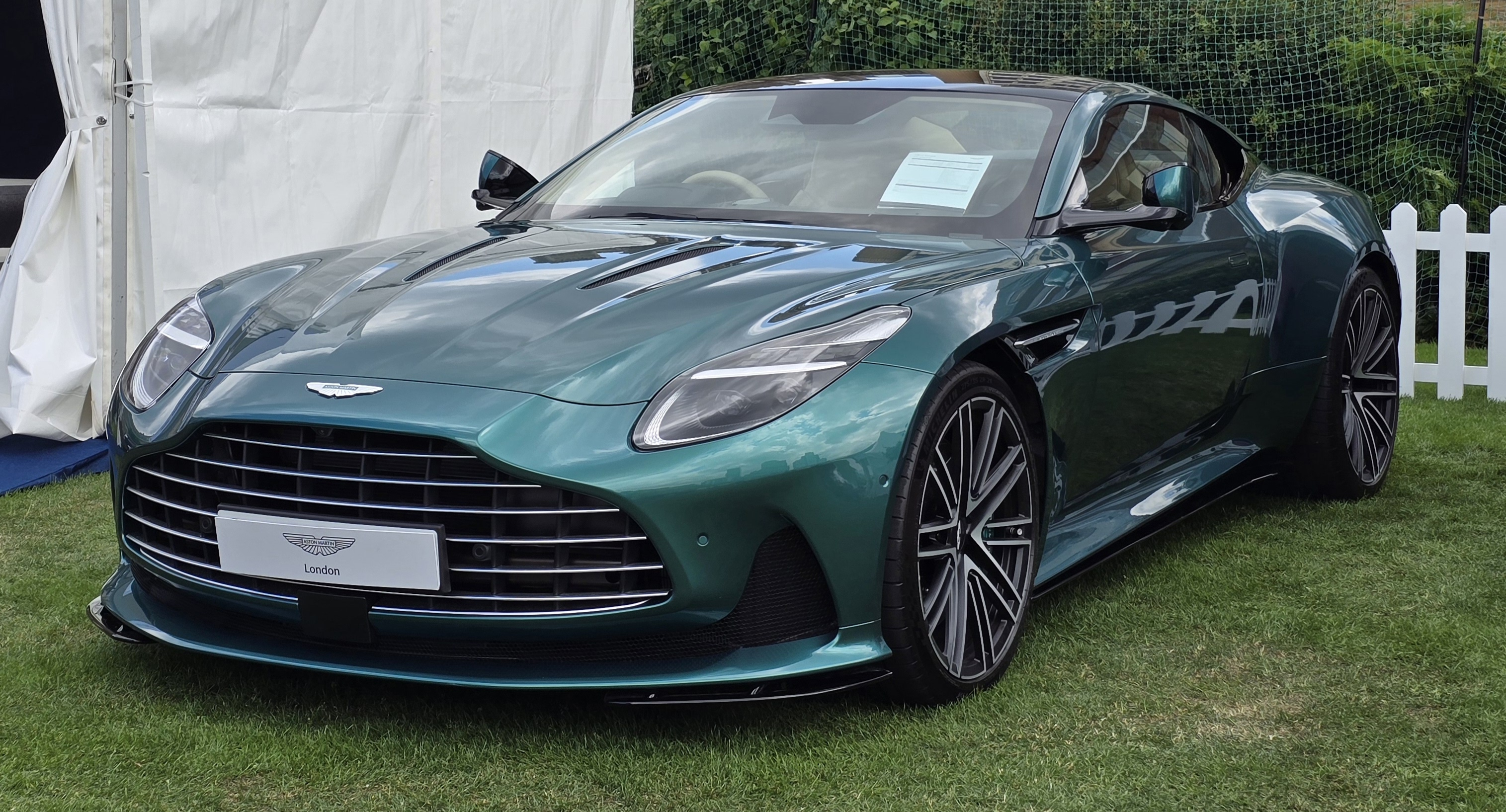
Aston Martin DB12

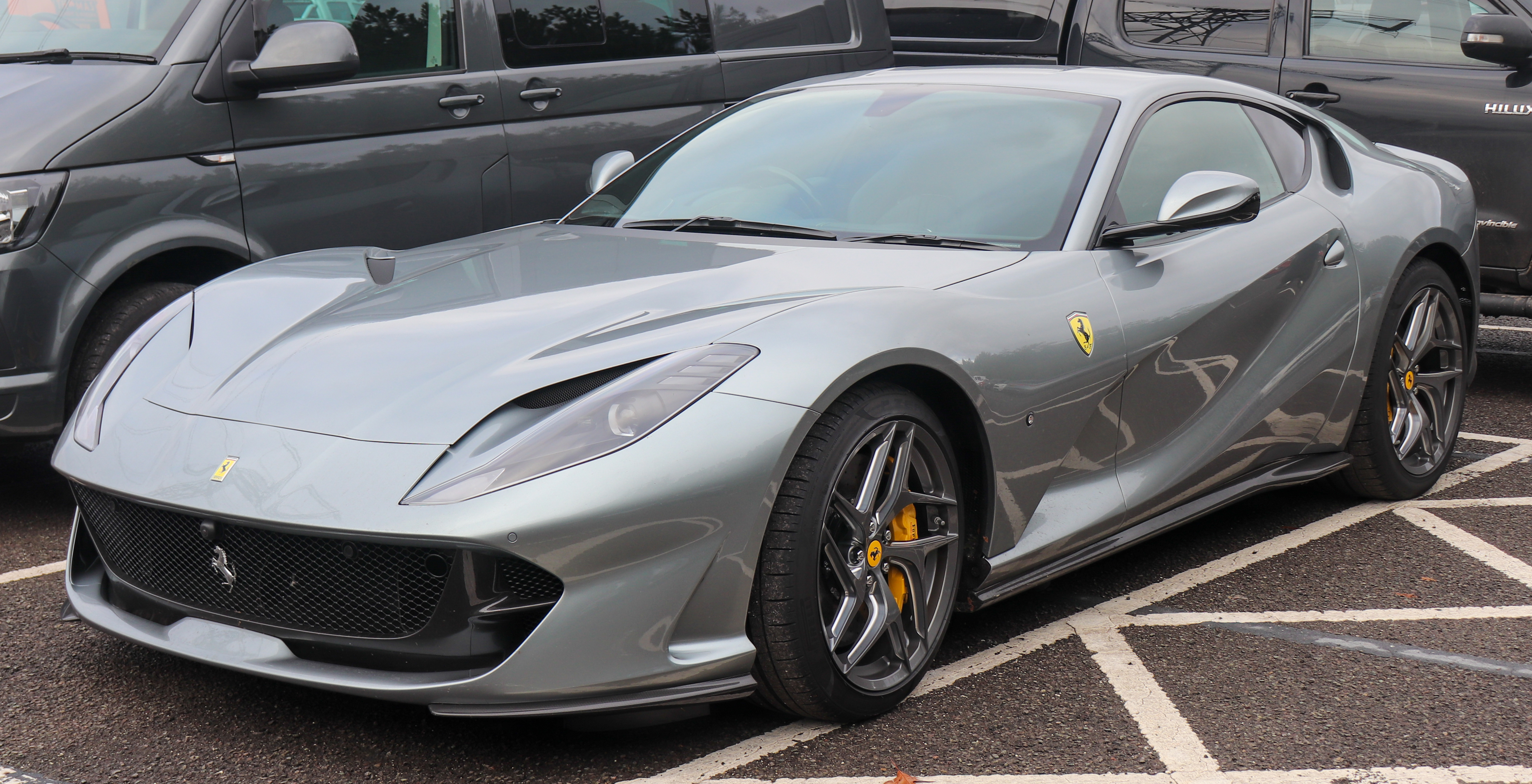
Ferrari 812 Superfast

=== Luxury SUV / Luxury crossover ===
Long before the luxury SUV segment was defined and became popular, the 1966 Jeep Super Wagoneer was marketed at the time as a fully-equipped station wagon. It was the first off-road SUV to offer a V8 engine and automatic transmission along with luxury car trim and equipment. Standard features included bucket seating, a center console, air conditioning, a seven-position tilt steering wheel, a vinyl roof, and gold-colored trim panels on the body sides and tailgate. It became "the most significant vehicle to carve a path for the modern luxury SUV". By the late 1970s, optional equipment included an electric sunroof. The 1978 Jeep Wagoneer Limited was the spiritual successor to the Super Wagoneer and was the first four-wheel drive car to use leather upholstery.

The Range Rover was released in 1970 as a two-door vehicle for off-road durability with few "creature comforts." A four-door version was added in 1981, and the model was pushed upmarket in 1983 by introducing an automatic transmission (Chrysler's A727 TorqueFlite) as an option. The Range Rover had a long-travel coil-spring suspension and a modified, Buick-designed aluminum V8 engine.

In the mid-1990s, the SUV market expanded with new entrants and the entry-level Ford Explorer and upscale Jeep Grand Cherokee became market leaders. The fastest-growing sector of this market was for so-called "luxury SUVs", which included the Jeep Grand Cherokee: "This vehicle is proof you can have a true off-road vehicle without giving up luxuries and amenities."

The SUV models generated higher profit margins than passenger cars, and car manufacturers began introducing new luxury SUVs during the late 1990s. SUVs such as the 1995 Lexus LX, 1997 Mercedes-Benz M-Class, and 1998 Lincoln Navigator were the first SUVs produced by these luxury car brands. Some of these early luxury SUV models used unibody construction, contributing to the trend away from the body-on-frame traditionally used by off-road vehicles.

During the mid-2000s, SUVs from luxury car brands grew by almost 40% in the United States to more than 430,000 vehicles (excluding SUV-only brands like Hummer and Land Rover), while luxury car sales declined 1% and non-luxury SUV sales were flat. By 2004, 30% of major luxury brands' U.S. sales were SUVs. Crossover SUVs became increasingly popular in the mid-2000s, and manufacturers began producing luxury versions. The Lexus RX was the earliest luxury crossover on the market, and it has since been the best-selling luxury vehicle in the US. Some luxury crossovers are built on a platform shared with sedans or hatchbacks. For example, the Infiniti FX is based upon the same platform as the Infiniti G35 sedans and coupes. While early luxury crossovers released in the late 1990s have resembled traditional boxy SUVs, later crossovers, such as the Infiniti FX and BMW X6, have been designed with a sporting appearance.

Despite the increased popularity of crossover models, traditional luxury SUVs remain in production. Examples include the Lexus LX, Infiniti QX80, and Lincoln Navigator.

Research data from the mid-2000s suggested that luxury SUV buyers did not consider traditional luxury cars (e.g., sedans and coupes); therefore, the SUV is becoming the key to bringing new customers into luxury dealerships.

Luxury brands have introduced SUV or crossover models in the 2010s. These include: Mercedes-Maybach GLS, Porsche Cayenne, BMW X7, Audi Q9, Lamborghini Urus, Ferrari Purosangue, Maserati Levante, Rolls-Royce Cullinan, Bentley Bentayga, Aston Martin DBX, Range Rover, Lotus Eletre, Lexus LX, Infiniti QX80, Hongqi LS7, AITO M9, Zeekr 9X, Nio ES9, Yangwang U8, Lincoln Navigator, and Cadillac Escalade.

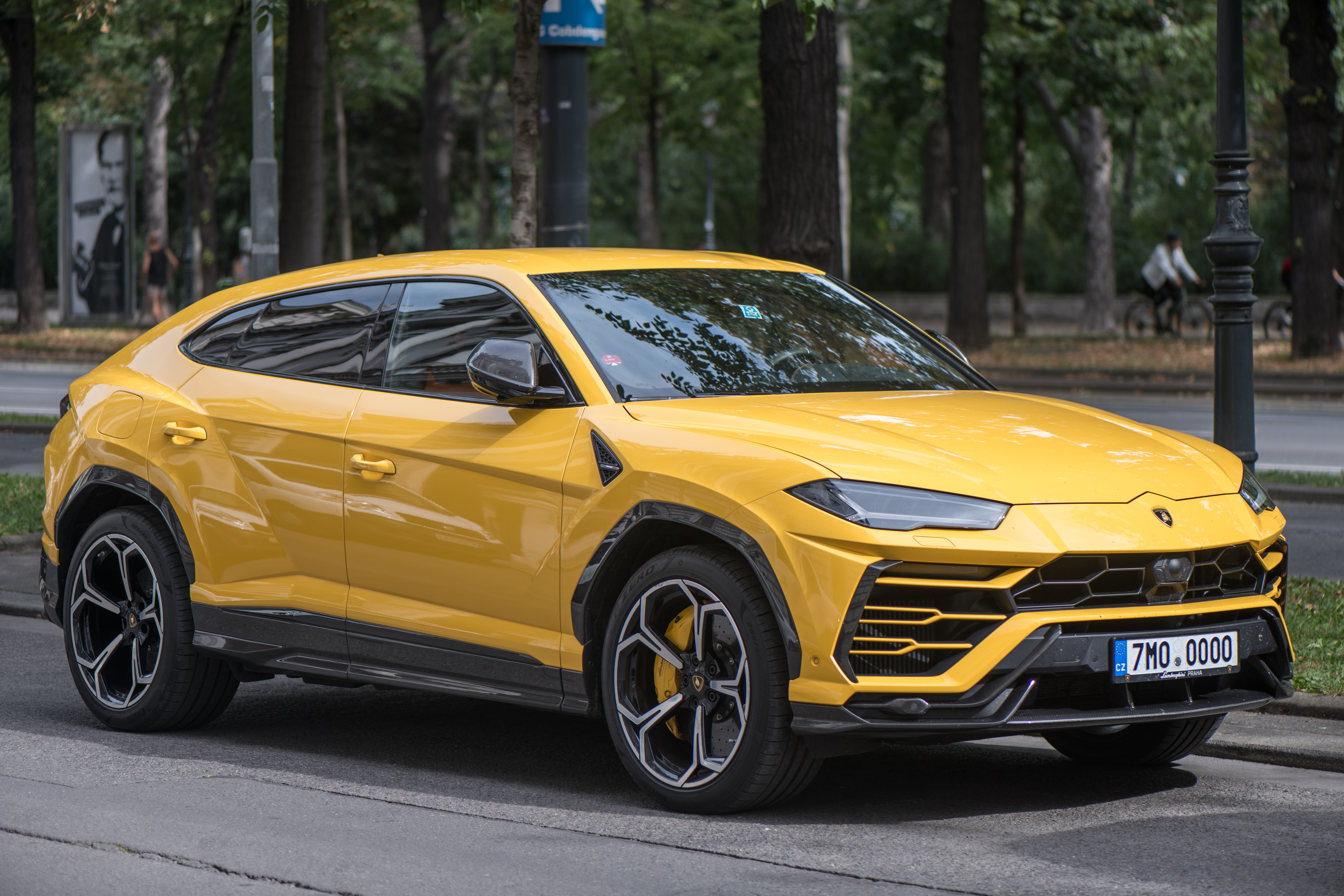
Lamborghini Urus

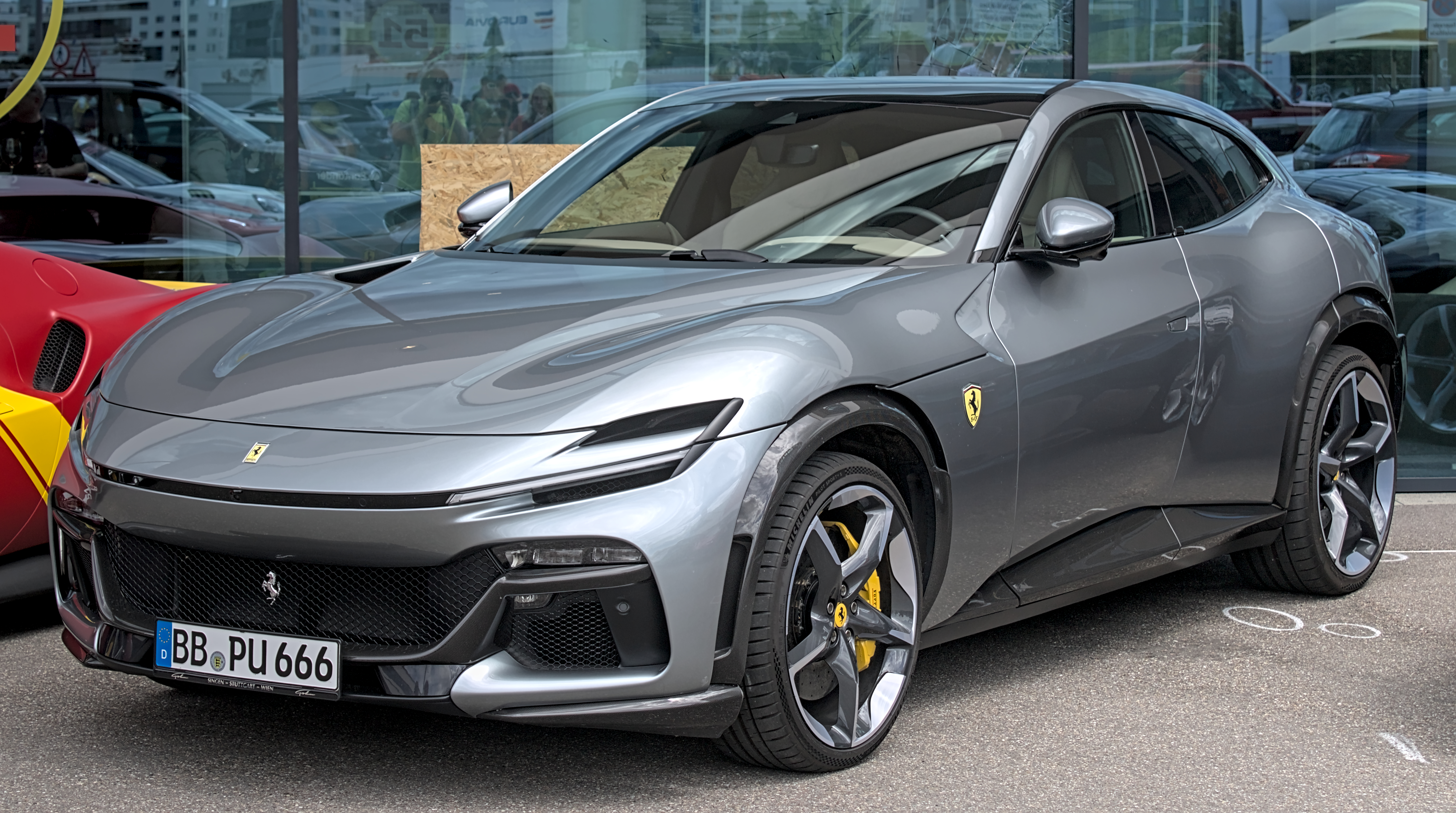
Ferrari Purosangue

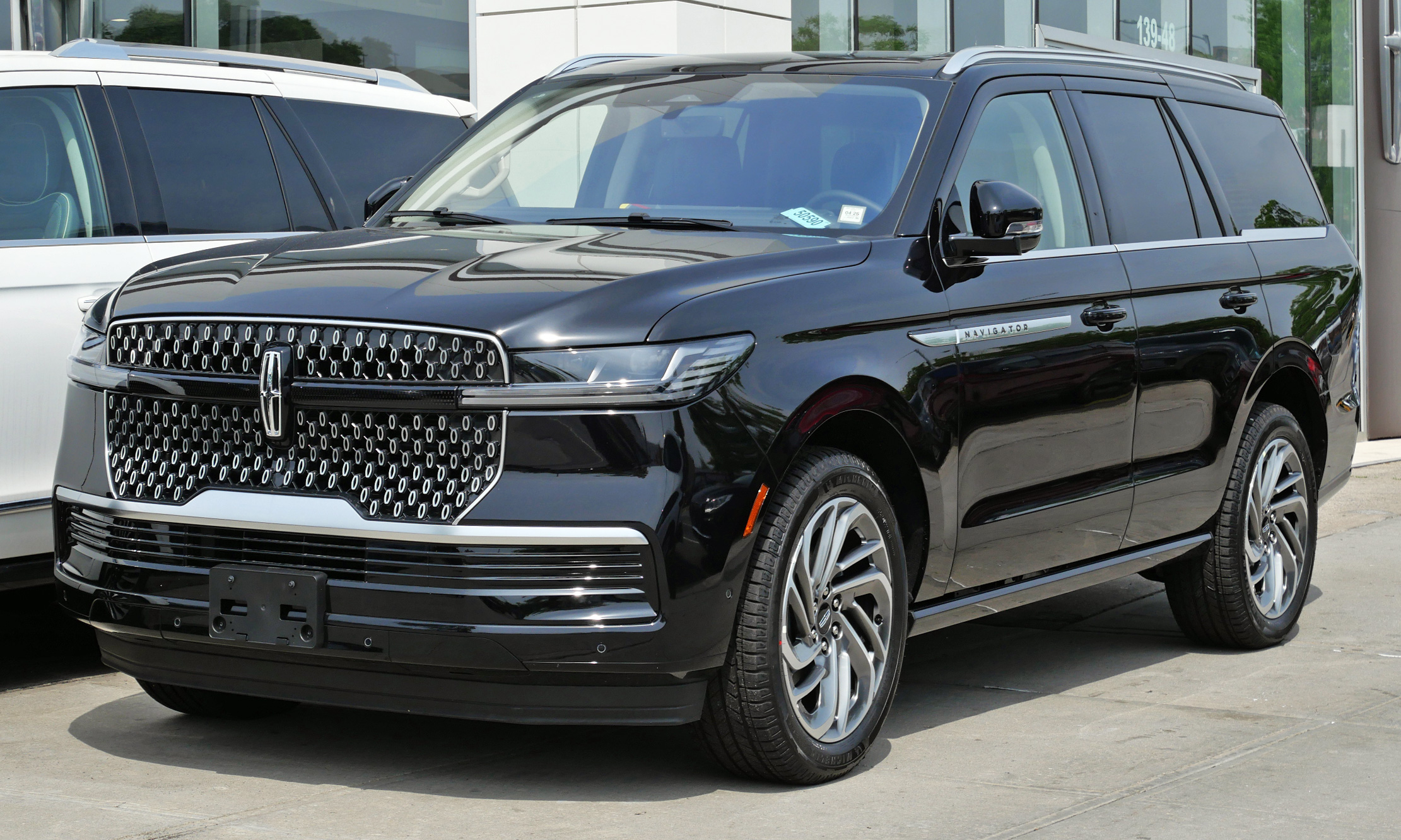
Lincoln Navigator

=== Luxury MPV ===
Manufacturers such as Mercedes-Benz, Toyota, Lexus, Buick, Hongqi, HIMA, Zeekr, and Volvo have marketed upscale luxury MPVs as luxury vehicles, primarily for Asian markets.

Luxury MPVs generally have three rows, offering six or seven seats; however, range-topping flagship models may also offer a two-row option with four seats, which typically have more features than their less expensive counterparts. By the early 2020s, manufacturers have found additional strategies to improve technologies, such as new materials, new systems, and improved exteriors.

Examples of luxury MPV models include Mercedes-Benz VLE, Lexus LM, Buick GL8, Hongqi HQ9, Maextro V800, Toyota Alphard, Volvo EM90, and the Zeekr 009.

Examples of luxury MPVs

Mercedes-Benz VLE

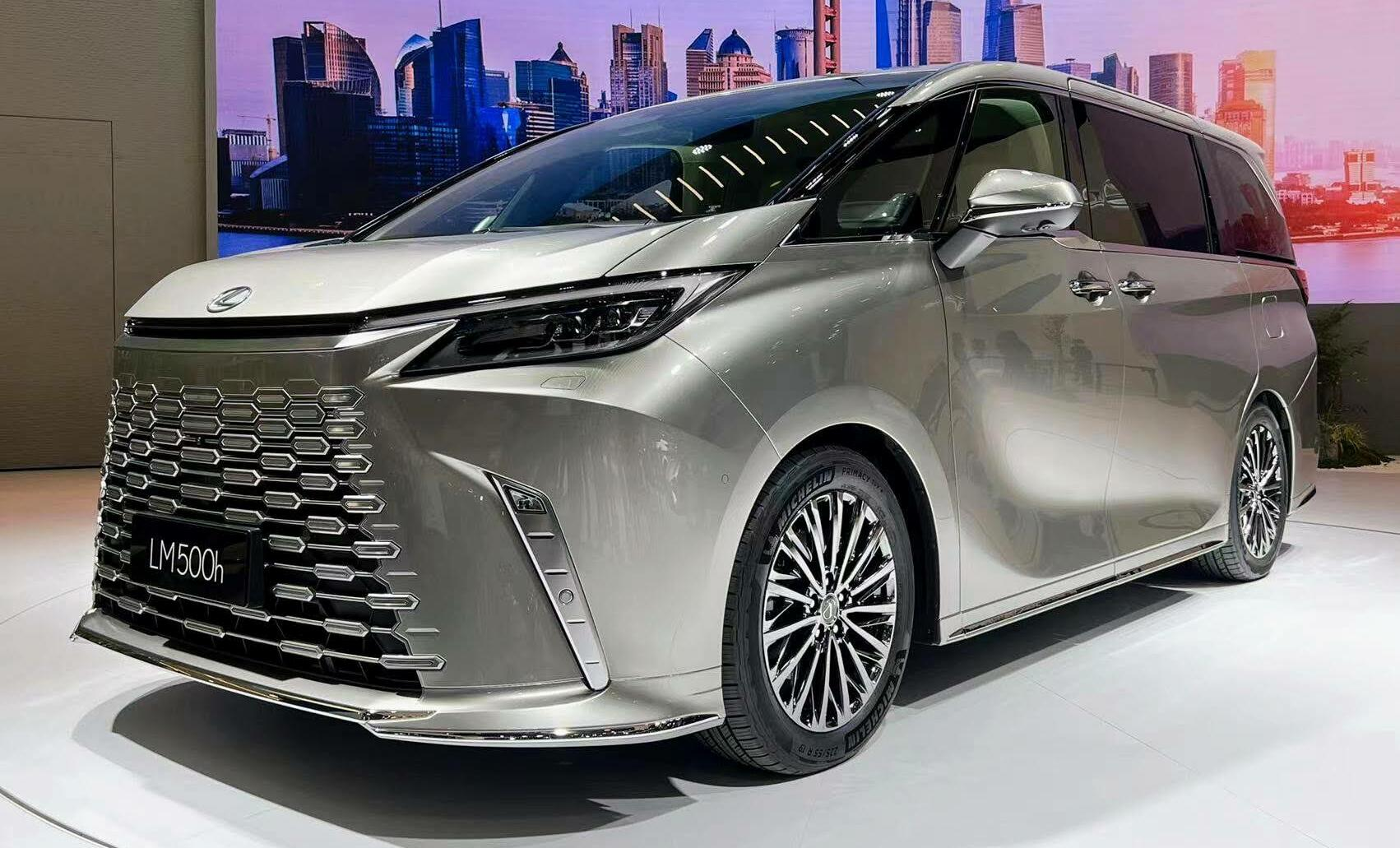
Lexus LM

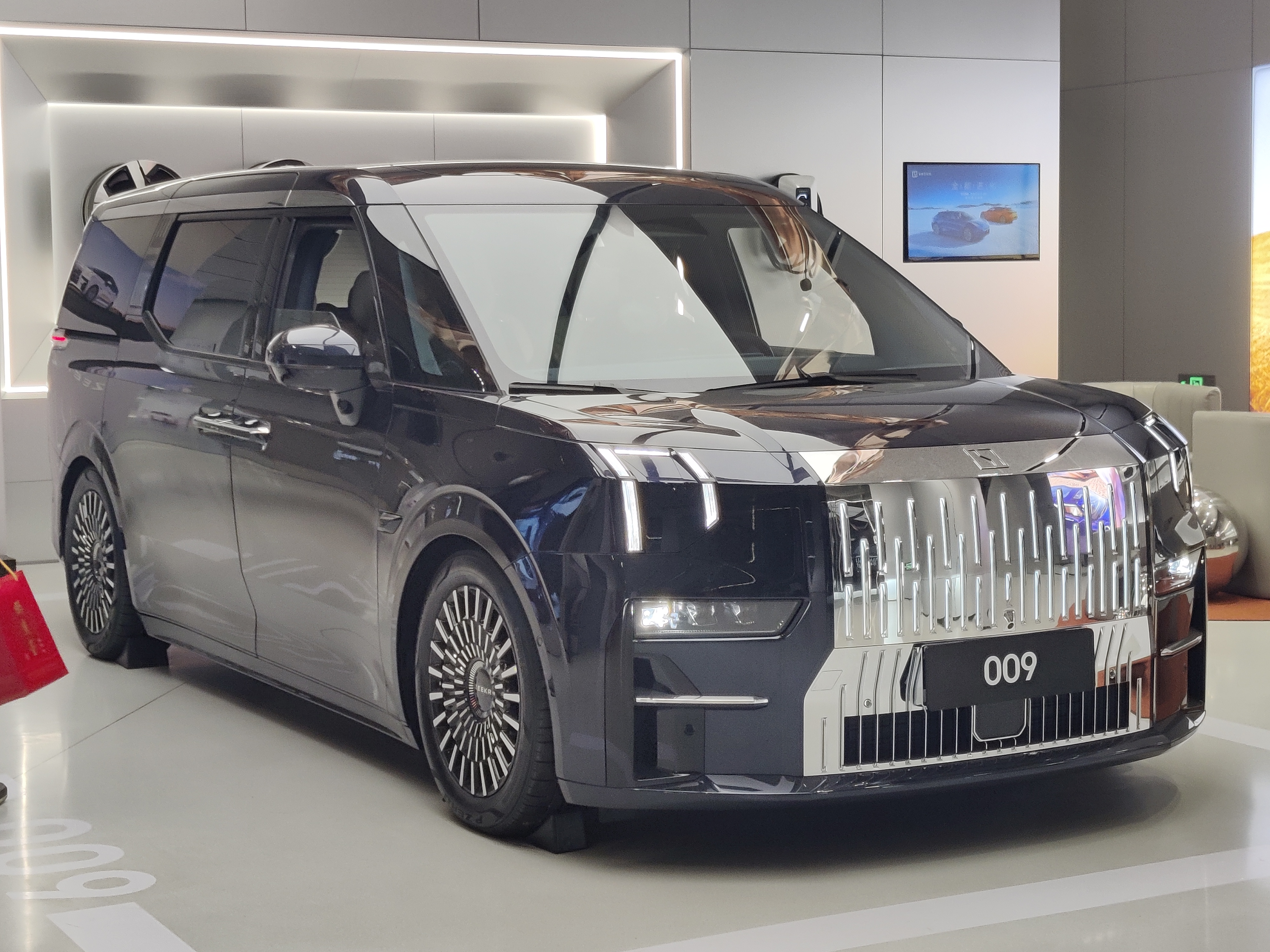
Zeekr 009

=== Ultra-luxury ===
In 2007, luxury cars costing over US$100,000 (equivalent to $155,272 in 2025) without tax, were considered as "ultra-luxury cars". Examples include the Rolls-Royce Phantom, Maybach 57 and 62, Mercedes-Maybach S-Class, Hongqi Guoli, Bentley Mulsanne, Bentley Flying Spur, Cadillac Celestiq, Toyota Century, and Aurus Senat. High-end sports cars which are targeted towards performance rather than luxury are not usually classified as ultra-luxury cars, even when their cost is greater than US$100,000. The history of a brand and the exclusivity of a particular model can result in price premiums compared to luxury cars with similar features from less prestigious manufacturers. Ultra-luxury cars are usually selected as the official state car, often equipped with bulletproof glass and first class travel seats.

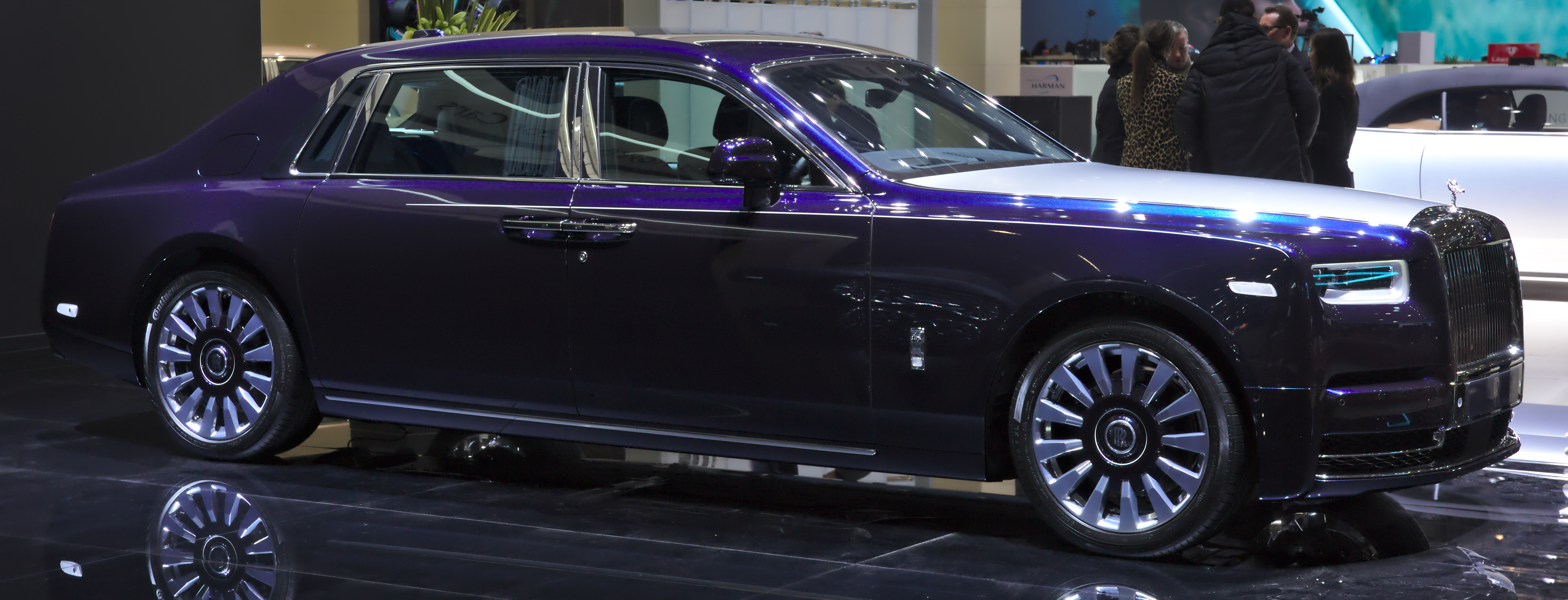
Rolls-Royce Phantom VIII

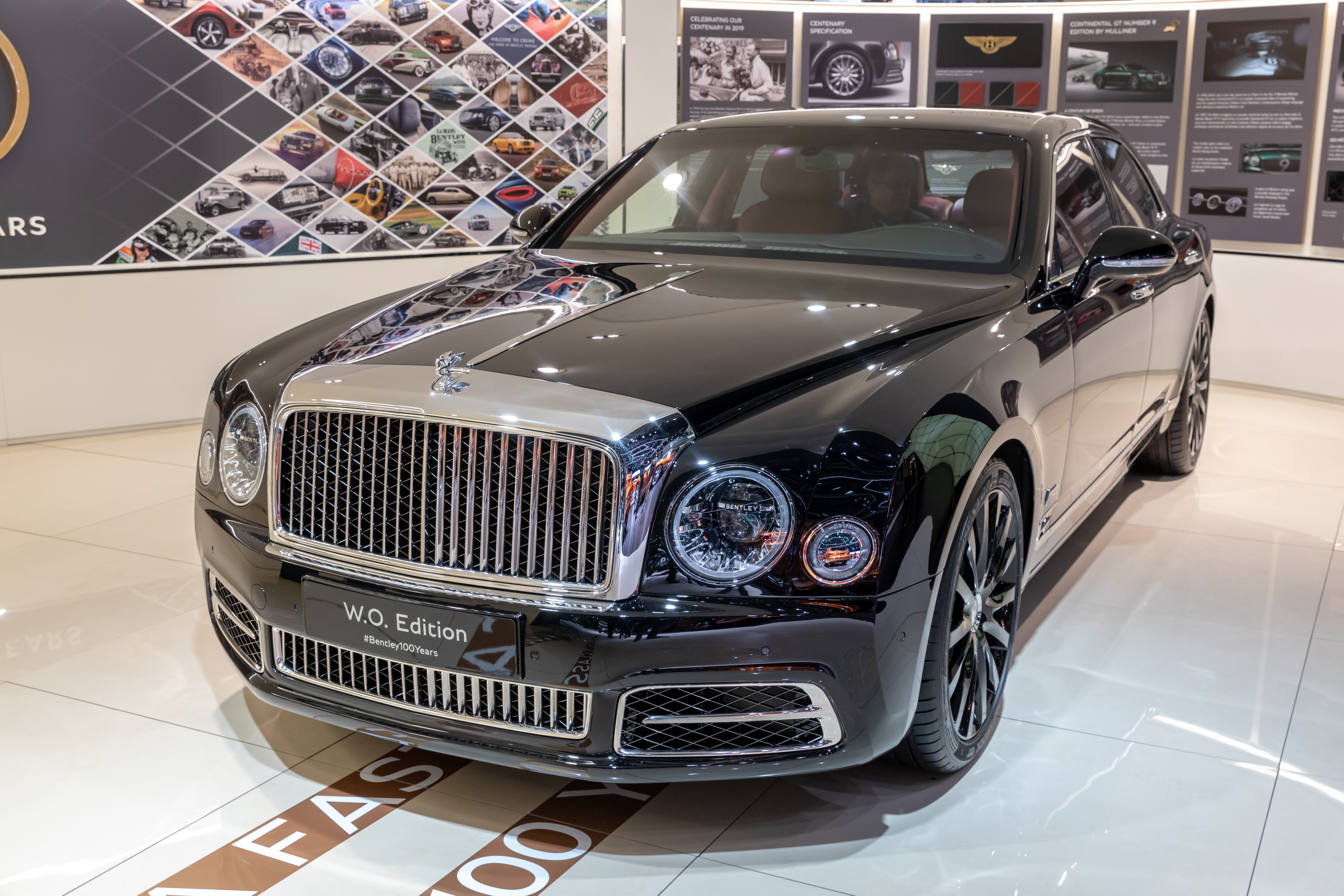
Bentley Mulsanne

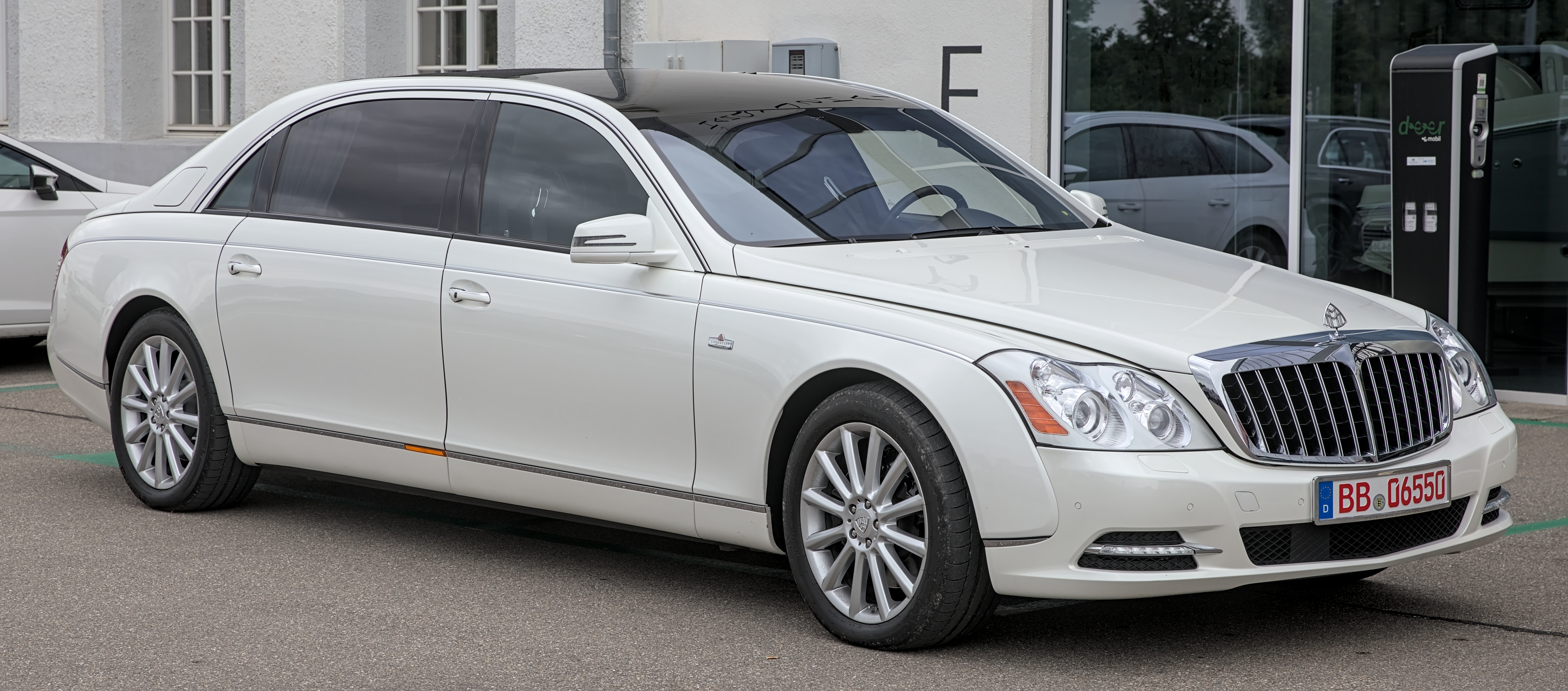
Maybach 62 S

== See also ==
- Car classification
- Luxury MPV
- Luxury goods
- Official state car
