= List of HIMA vehicles =

This is a list of vehicles of Harmony Intelligent Mobility Alliance/HIMA (Chinese: 鸿蒙智行; pinyin: Hóngméng Zhìxíng), an automotive alliance initiated by Chinese multinational technology company Huawei. The members of the alliance include AITO (Seres Group), Luxeed (Chery), Stelato (BAIC BluePark), Maextro (JAC Group), and SAIC (SAIC Motor).

== Current vehicles ==
Image	Name(s)	Chinese name(s)	Introduction (cal. year)	Generation	Description
Sedans
	Luxeed S7	智界S7	2023	First	Mid-size sedan, BEV
	SAIC Z7	尚界Z7	2026	First	Full-size sedan, BEV/EREV
	Stelato S9	享界S9	2024	First	Full-size sedan, BEV/EREV
	Maextro S800	尊界S800	2025	First	Full-size sedan, BEV/EREV
Station wagons/Shooting brake
	SAIC Z7T	尚界Z7T	2026	First	Full-size shooting brake, BEV/EREV
	Stelato S9T	享界S9T	2025	First	Full-size station wagon, BEV/EREV
SUVs
	AITO M5	问界M5	2021	First	Compact SUV, BEV/EREV
	SAIC H5	尚界H5	2025	First	Mid-size SUV, BEV/EREV
	AITO M6	问界M6	2026	First	Mid-size SUV, BEV/EREV
	AITO M7	问界M7	2022	Second	Full-size SUV, BEV/EREV
	Luxeed R7	智界R7	2024	First	Mid-size coupe SUV, BEV/EREV
	Luxeed RX	智界RX	2026	First	Mid-size coupe SUV, BEV
	AITO M8	问界M8	2025	First	Full-size SUV, BEV/EREV
	SAIC Z9	尚界Z9	upcoming	First	Full-size SUV, BEV
	Stelato G9	享界G9	2026	First	Full-size off-road SUV, BEV/EREV
	AITO M9 AITO M9 Ultimate	问界M9 问界M9 Ultimate 领世加长版	2023 2026	Second	Full-size SUV, BEV/EREV LWB version of M9
MPVs
	Stelato V8	享界V8	2026	First	Full-size MPV, BEV/EREV
	Luxeed V9	智界V9	2026	First	Full-size MPV, EREV
	Maextro V800 Maextro V680	尊界V800 尊界V680	2026	First	Full-size MPV, EREV

== See also ==
- Huawei Intelligent Automotive Solution
- List of Huawei products
- Automotive industry in China
