= Maextro =

Chinese ultra-luxury electric vehicle brand

- Product type: Automotive
- Current owner: JAC Group and Huawei
- Produced by: JAC Group
- Country: China
- Introduced: November 2024; 2 years ago
- Related brands: AITO (Seres); Luxeed (Chery); Stelato (BAIC BluePark); SAIC (SAIC Motor)
- Ambassadors: Xiang Xingchu (项兴初, Chairman and President of JAC Group); Yu Chengdong (Chairman of Huawei Consumer BG)
- Website: hima.auto/zunjie

Chinese name
- Simplified Chinese: 尊界
Transcriptions
Standard Mandarin
- Hanyu Pinyin: Zūn jiè

Maextro (Chinese: 尊界汽车; pinyin: Zūnjiè Qìchē) is a Chinese ultra-luxury electric vehicle brand established in 2024 by JAC Group. It is part of Huawei's HIMA multi-brand collaboration model, where Huawei handles product creation and design, provides technologies such as full-stack ADAS solutions and infotainment systems, and provides powertrain components, while JAC is responsible for chassis engineering and manufacturing of vehicles.

== Name ==
The name of the brand, Maextro, comes from the Italian language word maestro. The letter "S" in Maestro is changed to "X", symbolizing the "continuous exploration of the unknown and the creation of countless legends".

== History ==
In July 2024, Yu Chengdong (Richard Yu), Chairman of Huawei Consumer BG and Intelligent Automotive Solutions BU, revealed in an interview that the fourth HIMA brand, developed in collaboration with JAC Group, would be named Zunjie (尊界) in Chinese. In August 2024, during the Stelato S9 and Huawei new product launch event, Huawei officially introduced Maextro, the fourth brand under the HIMA collaboration with JAC.

Maextro's first vehicle, the S800, was initially unveiled at a Huawei Mate brand ceremony on November 26, 2024. Pre-orders opened on the same day. Details about the vehicle, including technologies developed by Huawei specifically for Maextro, were revealed at a technology showcase event on February 20, 2025. The model launched at the 2025 Shenzhen Auto Show on May 30, 2025.

JAC Group and Huawei jointly built a production facility in its home city of Hefei called the Maextro Super Factory, which completed construction on December 16, 2024. It has an annual production capacity of 200,000 units, and the company claims that it has an annual production volume of 100 billion yuan of product. The facility has 86 quality control gates and nearly 1,500 robots used for joining, gluing and painting processes.

=== Maextro–Maserati partnership ===
In November 2026, it was reported that JAC, Huawei, and Maserati will collaborate to manufacture two models, a mid-size electric SUV and a full-size electric GT. The vehicles will be built at JAC's Maextro factory. Maserati will be responsible for exterior design and chassis tuning. The vehicles will be sold under Maextro marque in China, while carry the Maserati badge in oversea market. The mass production planned for the fourth quarter of 2027.

== Products ==
=== Current models ===
- Maextro S800 (2025–present), full-size sedan, BEV/EREV
- Maextro V800 (2026–present), full-size MPV, EREV
  - Maextro V680 (2026–present), full-size MPV, EREV
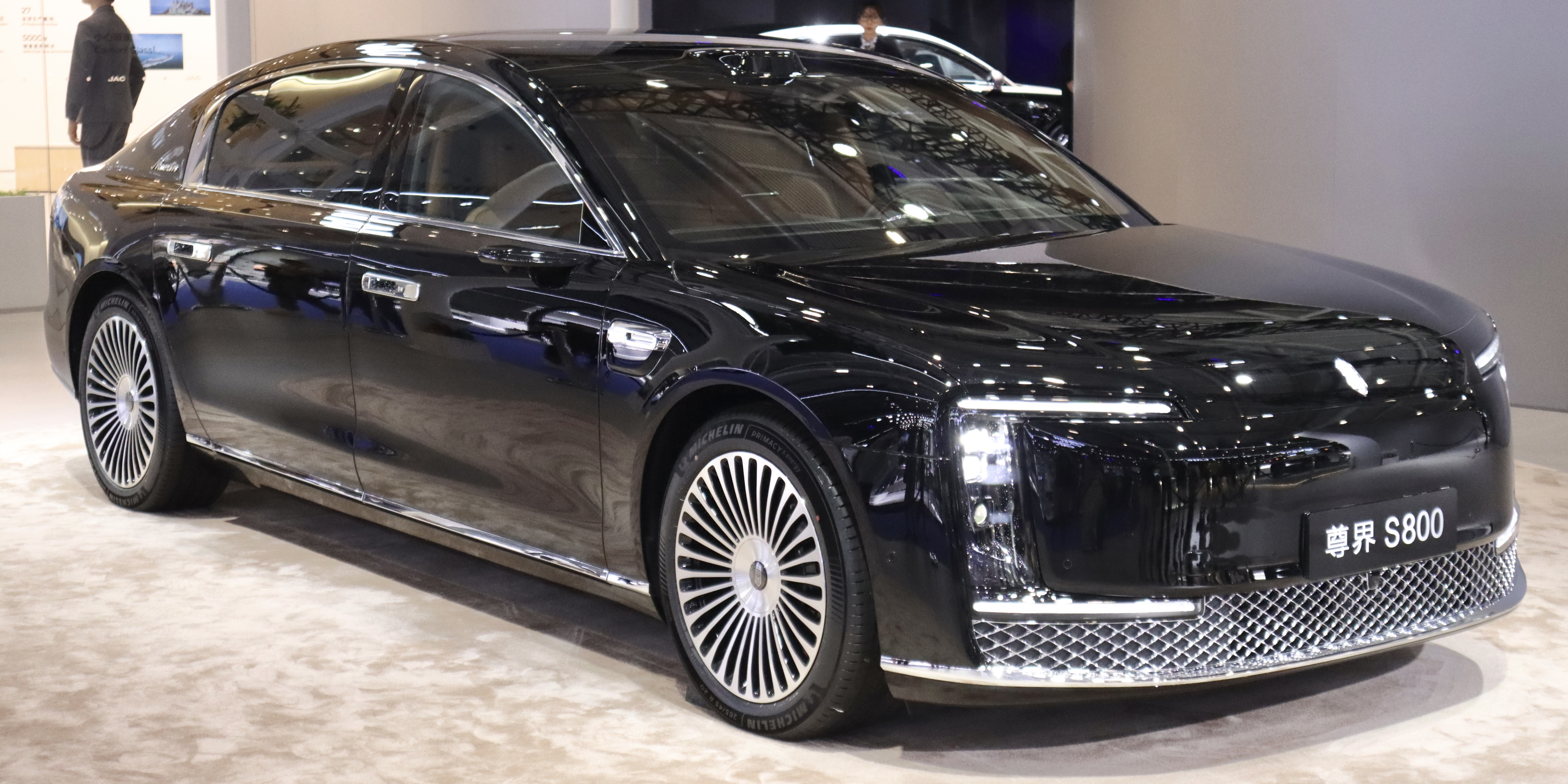
Maextro S800

Maextro V800

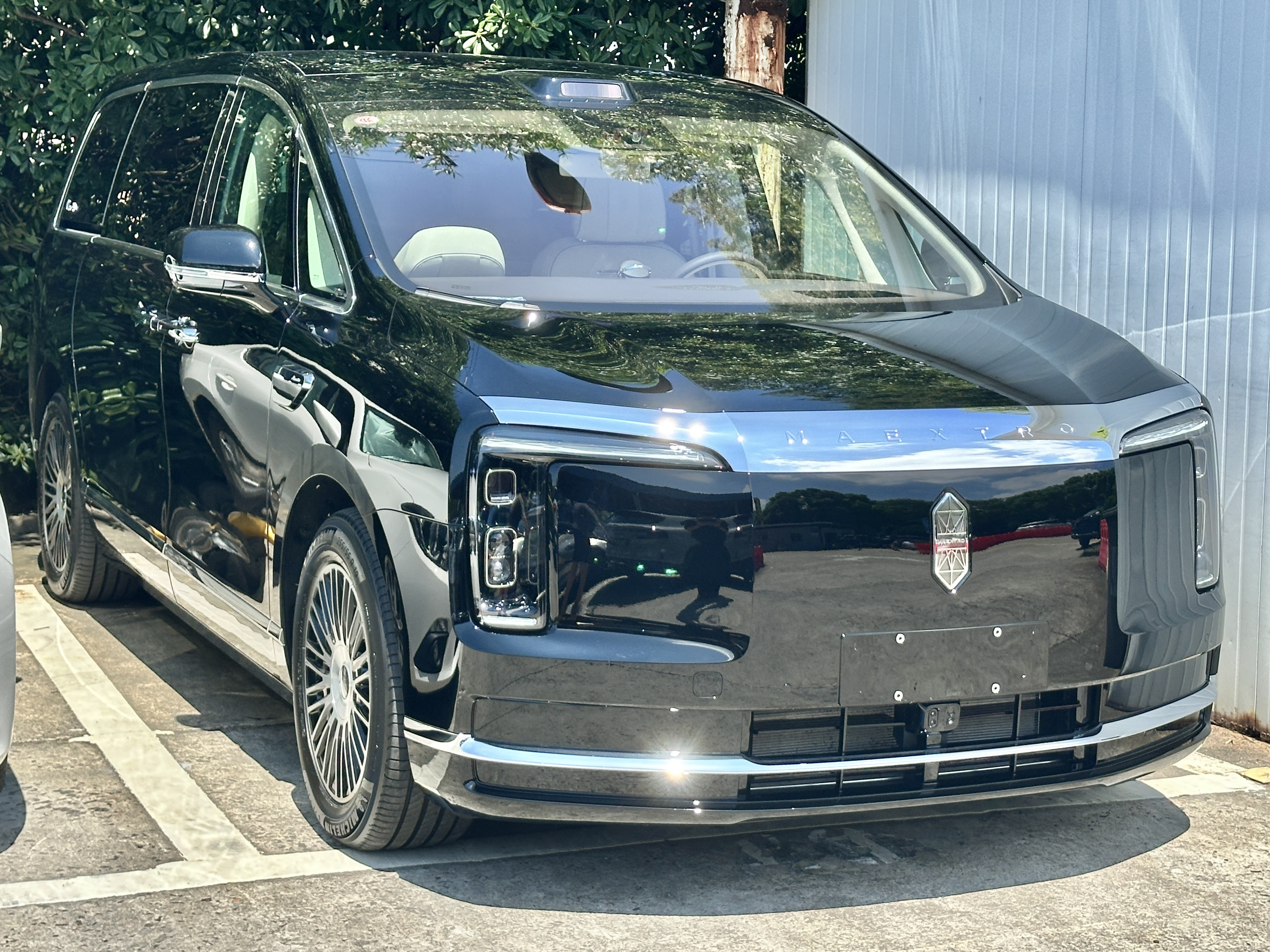
Maextro V680

=== Future vehicles ===
- Unnamed Maextro model, smaller than S800

== See also ==
- Harmony intelligence Mobility Alliance
- JAC Group
- AITO (marque)
- Luxeed
- Stelato
- SAIC (marque)
- Automobile manufacturers and brands of China
- List of automobile manufacturers of China
