= Stelato =

Chinese electric vehicle brand

- Product type: Automotive marque
- Current owner: BAIC BluePark; Huawei (HIMA)
- Country: China
- Introduced: 2024; 2 years ago
- Related brands: AITO (Seres); Luxeed (Chery); Maextro (JAC); SAIC (SAIC Motor)
- Markets: China
- Ambassadors: Zhang Jianyong (Chairman of BAIC Group); Yu Chengdong (Chairman of Huawei Consumer BG)
- Website: hima.auto/xiangjie/

Chinese name
- Simplified Chinese: 享界
- Hanyu Pinyin: Xiǎngjiè

Stelato (Chinese: 享界汽车; pinyin: Xiǎngjiè Qìchē) is a Chinese premium electric vehicle brand established in 2024. The brand operates under Harmony Intelligent Mobility Alliance (HIMA), a collaboration between BAIC BluePark and Huawei.

== History ==
In December 2023, Huawei, through its automotive business Harmony Intelligent Mobility Alliance (HIMA), registered a third car brand named Stelato. This brand was created in collaboration with BAIC Group's subsidiary, BAIC BluePark, which committed to producing a jointly developed model at its Beijing factory.

Stelato made its market debut in March 2024 with the unveiling of the Stelato S9, a battery electric full-size luxury sedan. Although the S9 featured Huawei's software and BAIC's technical capabilities, its design closely resembled the Luxeed S7, a smaller sedan produced since 2023 with Chery. The S9 was officially launched in April 2024 at the Beijing Auto Show.

== Products ==
- Stelato S9 (2024–present), full-size sedan (BEV/EREV)
- Stelato S9T (2025–present), full-size station wagon (BEV/EREV)
- Stelato G9 (2026–present), full-size off-road SUV (BEV/EREV)
- Stelato V8 (2026–present), full-size MPV (BEV/EREV)
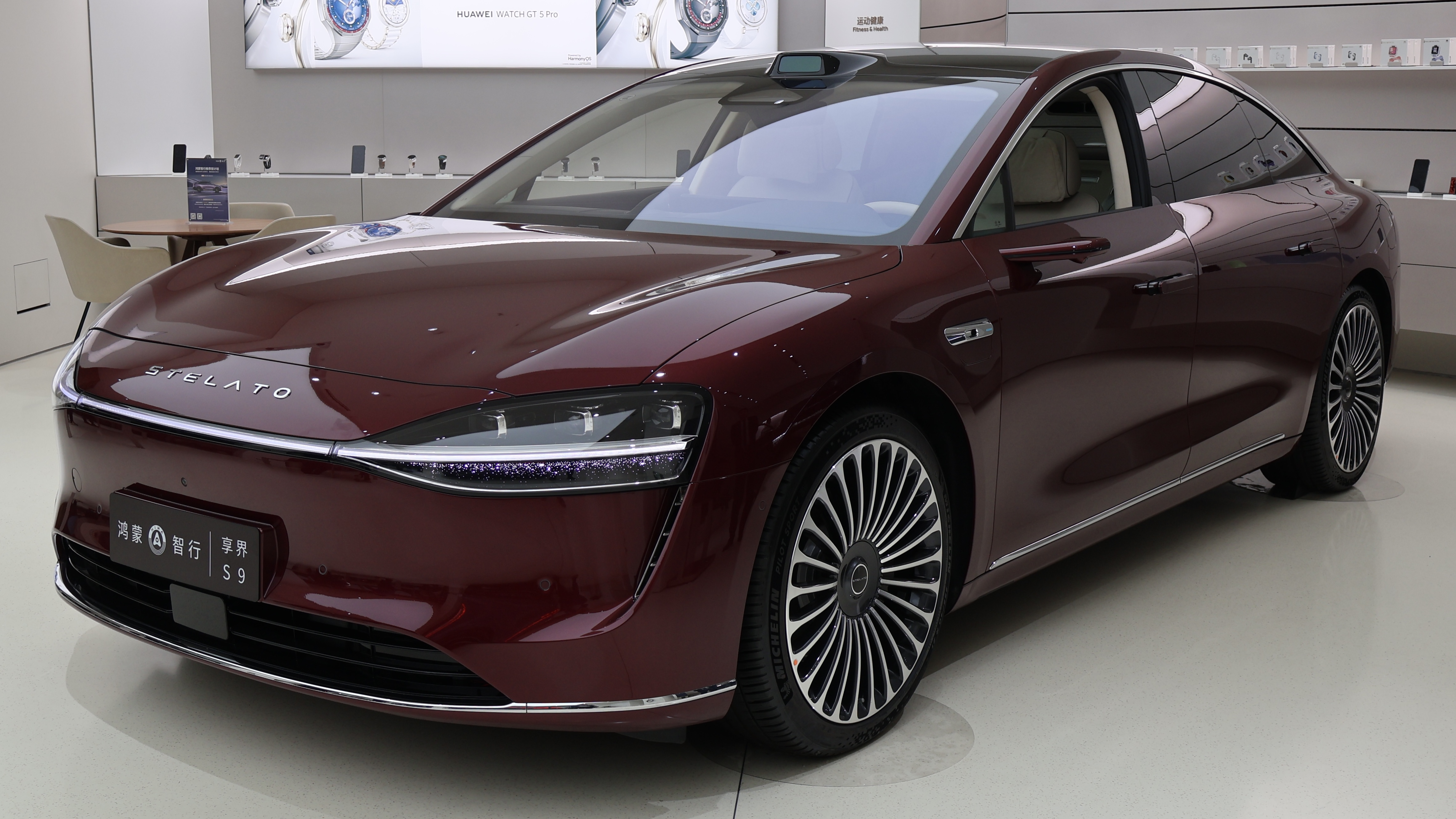
Stelato S9

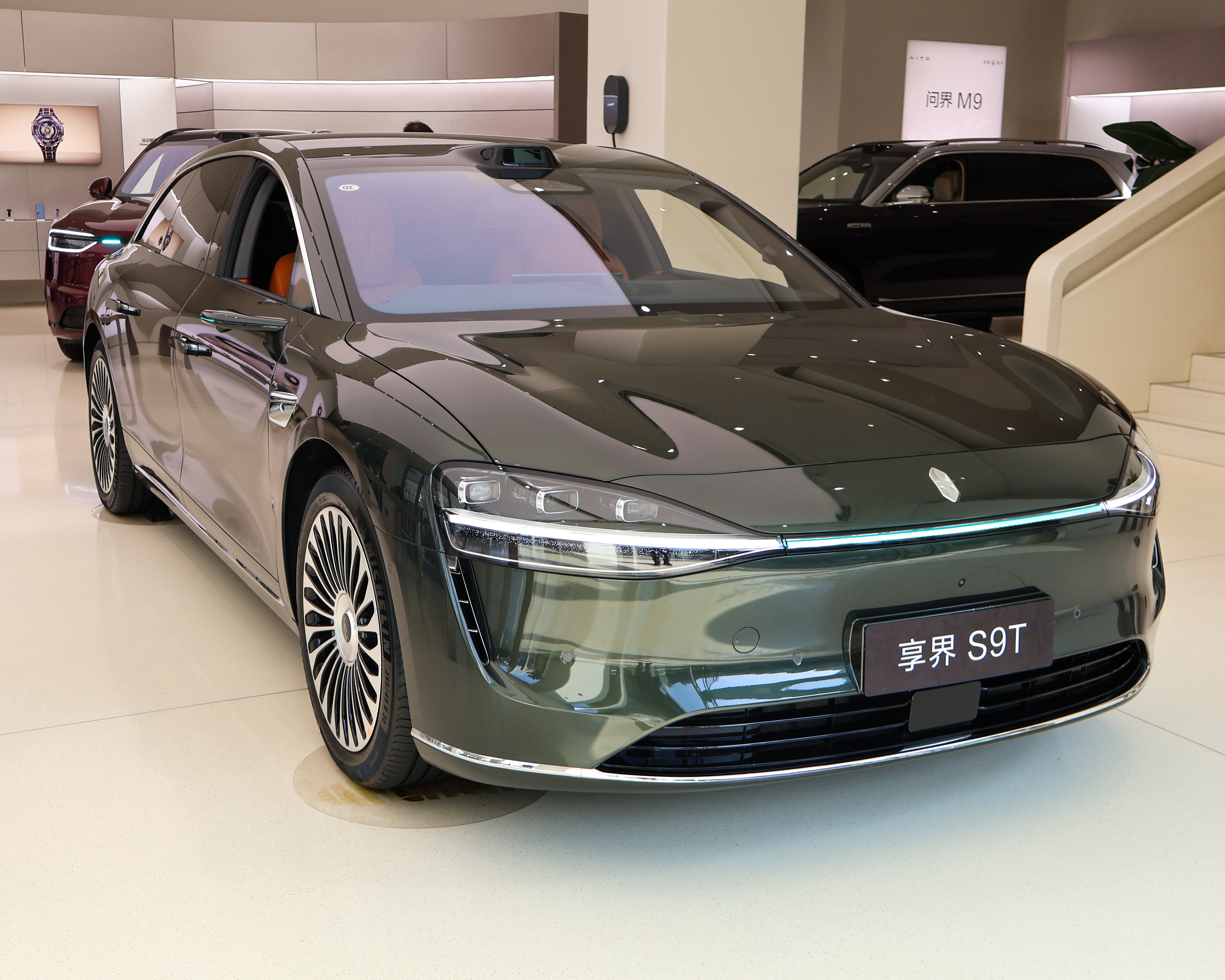
Stelato S9T

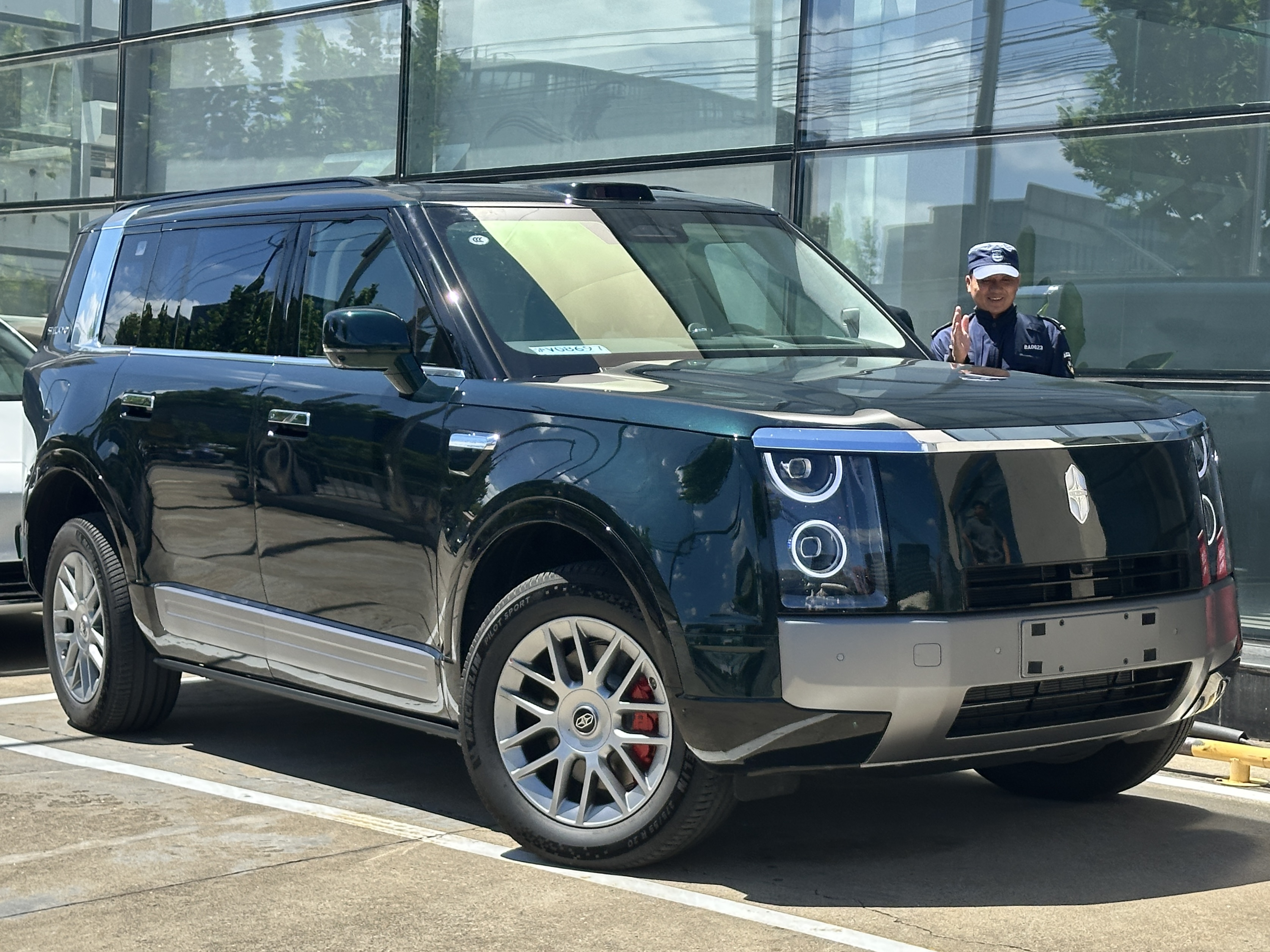
Stelato G9

Stelato V8

== See also ==
- List of automobile manufacturers of China
