= Luxeed RX =

Battery electric mid-size crossover SUV

Overview
- Manufacturer: Luxeed (Chery)
- Model code: EHX
- Also called: Luxeed Stormax (export)
- Production: September 2026 – present
- Designer: Werner Gruber

Body and chassis
- Class: Mid-size SUV
- Body style: 5-door coupe SUV
- Layout: Rear-motor, rear-wheel-drive; Dual-motors, four-wheel-drive
- Platform: Chery E0X platform
- Related: Luxeed S7; Luxeed R7; Luxeed V9

Powertrain
- Electric motor: HUAWEI DriveOne AC induction (front); HUAWEI DriveOne PMSM (rear)
- Power output: 277 kW (377 PS; 371 hp) (RWD); 437 kW (594 PS; 586 hp) (AWD)
- Battery: 81.1 kWh CATL × HUAWEI "Giant Whale" LFP; 100 kWh CATL × HUAWEI "Giant Whale" NMC
- Electric range: 702–852 km (436–529 mi) (CLTC)

Dimensions
- Wheelbase: 3,000 mm (118.1 in)
- Length: 5,020 mm (197.6 in)
- Width: 2,007 mm (79.0 in)
- Height: 1,585 mm (62.4 in)
- Curb weight: 2,250–2,400 kg (4,960–5,291 lb)

The Luxeed RX (Chinese: 智界RX; pinyin: Zhìjiè RX) is a battery electric mid-size coupe SUV produced by Chinese automobile manufacturer Luxeed, a premium brand of Chery in collaboration with HIMA, Huawei's multi-brand automotive alliance and sales network.

== Overview ==
Rear view

Interior

The RX was first teased through a video released on the social media platform Weibo on June 10, 2026.

The RX exterior design and some specifications were officially revealed on 11 June 2026. Luxeed markets the RX to be an FUV, a "fashion utility vehicle". Pre-sales for the RX opened at the 2026 Chengdu Auto Show on 20 August 2026, ahead of its official launch on 28 September, after which deliveries commenced on 25 October 2026.

The top Ultra+ variant features an active diffuser and a rear wing. It has optional power-opening front doors. The headlights adaptive headlights can act as a charging indicator and can illuminate to indicate the activation of the exterior voice command system.

The RX has aluminium double wishbone virtual-kingpin front and five-link multilink rear suspension geometry, with optional dual-valve active dampers and dual-chamber air suspension. It has 255 mm (10.0 in) section tires on both axles as standard, with an optional 275 mm (10.8 in) rear wheel package available, and uses a torque vectoring system. Luxeed says 90.5% of the chassis consists of high-strength steel and aluminium and has a tortional rigidity of 51,040 N·m/deg. The front doors have 2,400 MPa (350 ksi) steel reinforcements, while the B-pillar and rear door reinforcements use 2,200 MPa (320 ksi) hot-formed steel. Luxeed says the rear subframe consists of a one-piece die-casting covering the rear floor, motors and axle mounts, and suspension towers, which Luxeed claims increases strength by 55%. Additionally, the front uses a single casting consisting of the suspension towers, strut brace, and triangular reinforcement to increase stiffness to improve handling. It is equipped with front six-piston front brake calipers and ventilated FNC rotors, which allows for a claimed stopping distance from 100 km/h (62 mph) of 32.4 m (106.3 ft).

The dashboard features a 16.1-inch central infotainment touchscreen, an 8.88-inch digital instrument cluster supplemented by a 26-inch heads-up display, and a 8.88-inch passenger entertainment display. The front-row seats have a 'zero-gravity' recline mode and have active side bolsters. The physical exterior rearview mirrors can be supplemented by digital rearview mirror displays mounted on the doors. It has a 7.7-litre (0.27 cu ft) refrigerator in the center console, a panoramic sunroof with power sunshade, and the front seats have a 'zero-gravity' recline mode and active side bolsters with 15 mm (0.59 in) of adjustment.

The RX has 622 litres (22.0 cu ft) of rear cargo space with a 30-litre (1.1 cu ft) underfloor compartment.

The RX is available with two versions of Huawei's Qiankun ADS 5 ADAS system. The standard version is ADS 5 Max, which is equipped with a single roof-mounted LiDAR and 3 mmWave radars and is capable of assisted driving in highway and urban conditions. The higher end Ultra system uses Huawei's latest 896-line LiDAR and adds 3 wide angle LiDARs to the side and rear, two additional mmWave radars. Additionally, it features double compute chip, power supplies, braking systems, steering controllers, vehicle positioning, and network antennas to achieve full ADAS component redundancy, which Luxeed says makes the vehicle L3 ready.

== Powertrain ==
The RX sees the debut of Huawei's latest generation induction motor module, which is equipped as a front motor on dual-motor all-wheel drive models, which outputs 215 hp (160 kW; 218 PS) and has a top speed of 21,000 rpm and can achieve 251 km/h (156 mph). The rear motor has a peak efficiency of 98.2% and Luxeed says it has a response time of 1 millisecond or lower. The battery in the Ultra+ model is the first to feature Huawei's black box redundancy system.

Specifications
Model	Battery		Motor		Power	Range	30–80% charge	0–100 km/h (62 mph)	Top speed	Kerb weight
Model	Type	Weight	Front	Rear	Power	CLTC	30–80% charge	0–100 km/h (62 mph)	Top speed	Kerb weight
	81.1 kWh LFP	575 kg (1,268 lb)	—	277 kW YY67-TZ210A05 PMSM	372 hp (277 kW; 377 PS)	672–702 km (418–436 mi)	15 min	5.6 s	251 km/h (156 mph)	2,285 kg (5,038 lb)
Max	100.256 kWh NMC	518 kg (1,142 lb)	—	277 kW YY67-TZ210A05 PMSM	372 hp (277 kW; 377 PS)	822 km (511 mi)	15 min	5.6 s	251 km/h (156 mph)	2,250 kg (4,960 lb)
Ultra	100.424 kWh NMC	529 kg (1,166 lb)	—	277 kW YY67-TZ210A05 PMSM	372 hp (277 kW; 377 PS)	852 km (529 mi)	15 min	5.6 s	251 km/h (156 mph)	2,280 kg (5,027 lb)
Ultra AWD	100.424 kWh NMC	531 kg (1,171 lb)	160 kW YY67-YS210A06 induction	277 kW YY67-TZ210A05 PMSM	586 hp (437 kW; 594 PS)	753 km (468 mi)	15 min	3.6 s	251 km/h (156 mph)	2,370 kg (5,225 lb)
Ultra+	100.424 kWh NMC	531 kg (1,171 lb)	160 kW YY67-YS210A06 induction	277 kW YY67-TZ210A05 PMSM	586 hp (437 kW; 594 PS)	700 km (435 mi)	15 min	3.6 s	251 km/h (156 mph)	2,400 kg (5,291 lb)

== Controversy ==
Briefly after the reveal of the RX, Zhao Changjiang, the executive director and executive vice president of Luxeed, claimed on Weibo that the brand had recruited a "former Ferrari chief designer". However, this was challenged by the PR director of Ferrari Greater China, Ingrid Sun. Users of Weibo further added to the scepticism, citing the stable position of Ferrari's chief designer, Flavio Manzoni. The original post by Zhao was deleted shortly afterwards.

In addition to controversies surrounding former Ferrari designer, some bloggers and Chinese social media claimed that the car has a striking resemblance to the Xiaomi YU7, but with a mechanical semi-hidden handles instead of electronic inward-flip concealed design to comply against China's safety regulations which might start ban hidden handles from 2027.
