= Luxeed =

Chinese electric vehicle brand

Anhui Luxeed New Energy Automobile Co., Ltd
- Native name: 安徽智界新能源汽车有限公司
- Type: Subsidiary
- Industry: Automotive; Production systems
- Founded: November 2023; 3 years ago (as a division of Chery) January 2025; 1 year ago (as a subsidiary of Chery)
- Headquarters: Wuhu, China
- Area served: China
- Key people: Zhao Changjiang (Executive director and vice president)
- Products: Automobiles
- Parent: Chery
- Website: hima.auto/zhijie/

Anhui Luxeed New Energy Automobile Co., Ltd or Luxeed (Chinese: 智界汽车; pinyin: Zhìjiè Qìchē; lit. 'Intelligent world') is a premium electric vehicle manufacturer owned by Chery, in cooperation with Huawei under the Harmony Intelligent Mobility Alliance (HIMA).

== History ==
In November 2023, Huawei announced the establishment of automotive alliance HIMA and the Luxeed S7 that jointly developed with a Chinese automotive manufacturer Chery. Luxeed cars went on sale in selected Chinese Huawei showrooms, along with other HIMA brands.

In June 2024, Luxeed launched its second model, the mid-size coupe SUV R7. In the same month, Huawei announced to transfer the trademark of Luxeed in Chinese language "智界; Zhìjiè" to Chery.

In January 2025, Anhui Luxeed New Energy Automobile Co., Ltd. was established. The company is wholly owned by Chery Automobile Co., Ltd., indicating that the Luxeed brand has become an independently operated entity within Chery.

After Luxeed's resources were consolidated, development for a minivan under the brand began in August 2025. The development team originally worked on the E08 minivan for Exeed, another brand owned by Chery. The minivan is currently known internally as the EHV.

The name of Luxeed's MPV was unveiled as the V9 in December 2025, will make its debut in the spring of 2026, and will launch in the first half of 2026. It will be the first MPV offered by any HIMA brand.

In October 2026, Luxeed stated that it will enter overseas markets by 2027, including right-hand drive markets, without Huawei involvement in software and hardware. Planned markets include Australia, New Zealand, Indonesia, Malaysia, Thailand, and the Philippines. It also announced its global line-up that include the Luxeed Llounge, a restyled version of the V9, and the Luxeed Stormax, a rebadged RX.

== Products ==
=== Current models ===
- Luxeed S7 (2023–present), mid-size sedan (BEV)
- Luxeed R7 (2024–present), mid-size coupe SUV (BEV/EREV)
- Luxeed RX/Stormax (2026–present), mid-size SUV (BEV)
- Luxeed V9/Llounge (2026–present), full-size MPV (EREV)
Luxeed S7

Luxeed R7

Luxeed RX

Luxeed V9

== See also ==
- Harmony intelligence Mobility Alliance
- AITO (marque)
- Stelato
- Maextro
- SAIC (marque)
- Automobile manufacturers and brands of China
- List of automobile manufacturers of China
- Chery
