= Stelato V8 =

Full-size luxury minivan

Overview
- Manufacturer: Stelato (BAIC BluePark)
- Production: 2026–present
- Assembly: China: Beijing (BJEV Stelato plant)

Body and chassis
- Class: Full-size luxury minivan (M)
- Body style: 5-door minivan
- Layout: Front-engine, rear-motor, rear-wheel-drive; Front-engine, dual-motor, all-wheel-drive
- Platform: Tuling chassis platform

Powertrain
- Engine: Petrol range extender: 1.5 L S15T0PH turbo I4
- Electric motor: Huawei DriveONE
- Power output: 305–519 hp (227–387 kW; 309–526 PS)
- Hybrid drivetrain: Series (EREV)
- Battery: 56 kWh CATL LFP (EREV); 75.4 kWh CATL NMC (EREV); 120 kWh CATL NMC (BEV)
- Range: 1,365–1,465 km (848–910 mi) (EREV, CLTC)
- Electric range: 775–830 km (482–516 mi) (EV, CLTC); 260–339 km (162–211 mi) (EREV, WLTP); 330–430 km (205–267 mi) (EREV, CLTC)
- Plug-in charging: 300 km (186 mi) in 10 minutes

Dimensions
- Wheelbase: 3,250 mm (128.0 in)
- Length: 5,335 mm (210.0 in)
- Width: 2,005 mm (78.9 in)
- Height: 1,825 mm (71.9 in)
- Curb weight: 2,760–2,895 kg (6,085–6,382 lb)

The Stelato V8 (Chinese: 享界V9; pinyin: Xiǎngjiè V8) is a battery electric and range extended full-size luxury minivan produced by BAIC BluePark and sold under Stelato, a brand of BAIC Group created in collaboration with HIMA, Huawei's multi-brand automotive alliance and sales network. It is the second minivan to be sold by any HIMA brand.

== Overview ==
The V8 debuted on 21 August 2026 at the 2026 Chengdu Auto Show, with 5 trim levels and a 7-seater layout on a 800-volt platform featuring Huawei's ADS driver-assistance system. Pre-sales opened on 28 September 2026, and it launched on 20 November 2026. V8 stands for, New design aesthetics, New stance, New space, New household, New performance, New freedom, New safety and New defence.

Rear view

Interior

The V8 has a drag coefficient of 0.226C_{d}.

The V8 has dual-chamber air suspension with 80 mm (3.1 in) of ride height adjustment, dual-valve adaptive dampers, and ±12° rear-wheel steering for a turning radius of 5.09 metres (16.7 ft). Stelato says the chassis features 16 2000 M·Pa high-strength steel reinforcements, and claims that the V8 passed the US FMVSS No. 301 80 km/h (50 mph) 70% offset rear-impact crash test.

It has a total Interior floor area of 7.41 m^{2} (79.8 sq ft), and the rear sliding door has a 730 mm (28.7 in) opening. The second-row seats rotate outwards by 45° and automatically fold down the armrests when doors opened and lower the air suspension for an entry height of 380 mm (15.0 in), and the seats can also rotate by up to 180° to face the third row. With the second row facing forward, the aisle to the third row measures 190 mm (7.5 in) wide and 1,352 mm (53.2 in). It has a rear cargo area measuring 647 litres (22.8 cu ft), expanding to 1,552 litres (54.8 cu ft) with the third-row folded flat. It has optional liquid crystal dimming side windows.

The dashboard has a continuous screen setup with a 12.3-inch digital instrument cluster, 17.2-inch central infotainment touchscreen, and 17.2-inch passenger infotainment display. It has a 21.4-inch 4K-resolution rear passenger entertainment display with 6.58-inch magnetic detachable control touchscreen, and a 25-speaker Huawei Sound audio system.

=== Features ===
The V8 minivan uses a conventional and mechanical door handles rather than the electronic hidden handles.

The V8 is available with 3 tiers of the Huawei Qiankun ADS 5 ADAS system. The base Max variant uses one Limera in-cabin solid-state LiDAR. The Ultra variants use a 896-line roof-mounted LiDAR and 3 solid-state wide-angle LiDARs facing to the side and rear. The Ultra variants have hardware redundancy which Huawei claims makes the system Level 3-ready. Both systems are capable of Level 2 supervised autonomous driving in highway and urban conditions.

== Powertrain ==
The V8 is expected to use Huawei's DriveONE powertrain and will ride on an 800-volt silicon carbide platform. The V9 has a choice of four battery packs: a 56, 75.4, 120 kWh LFP battery.

All versions use a permanent magnet synchronous rear motor outputting 305 hp (227 kW; 309 PS). All-wheel drive variants have an induction motor outputting 214 hp (160 kW; 217 PS) driving the front axle, for a total output of 519 hp (387 kW; 526 PS).

The range extender version uses a 1.5-liter turbocharged and direct-injected inline-4 petrol engine outputting 154 hp (115 kW; 156 PS) (158 hp (118 kW; 160 PS) gross). It has the option of two CATL-supplied battery packs, a 56 kWh LFP pack providing WLTP electric range ratings of 275 kilometres (171 mi) for rear-wheel drive and 260 kilometres (162 mi) for all-wheel drive, and a 75.4 kWh NMC pack providing 339 kilometres (211 mi) of WLTP electric range with all-wheel drive. Both battery packs recharge from 20–80% in 15 minutes.

The electric version is equipped with a 120 kWh NMC battery pack supplied by CATL, which provides CLTC range ratings of 830 and 775 kilometres (516 and 482 mi) for rear- and all-wheel drive, respectively, and recharges from 20–80% in 15 minutes.

Specifications
Battery		Motor		Power	Torque	Electric range		0–100 km/h (62 mph)	Top speed	Kerb weight
Type	Weight	Front	Rear	Power	Torque	WLTP	CLTC	0–100 km/h (62 mph)	Top speed	Kerb weight
EREV
56 kWh LFP CATL	406 kg (895 lb)	—	227 kW QT67TZ210D01 PMSM	305 hp (227 kW; 309 PS)	320 N⋅m (236 lb⋅ft)	275 km (171 mi)	355 km (221 mi)	8.4 s	203 km/h (126 mph)	2,810 kg (6,195 lb)
56 kWh LFP CATL	406 kg (895 lb)	160 kW YS210XYC54induction	227 kW QT67TZ210D01 PMSM	519 hp (387 kW; 526 PS)	528 N⋅m (389 lb⋅ft)	260 km (162 mi)	330 km (205 mi)	5.9 s	215 km/h (134 mph)	2,895 kg (6,382 lb)
75.4 kWh NMC CATL	416 kg (917 lb)	160 kW YS210XYC54induction	227 kW QT67TZ210D01 PMSM	519 hp (387 kW; 526 PS)	528 N⋅m (389 lb⋅ft)	339 km (211 mi)	430 km (267 mi)	5.9 s	215 km/h (134 mph)	2,895 kg (6,382 lb)
EV
120 kWh NMC CATL	628 kg (1,385 lb)	—	227 kW QT67TZ210D01 PMSM	305 hp (227 kW; 309 PS)	320 N⋅m (236 lb⋅ft)	—	830 km (516 mi)	8.4 s	215 km/h (134 mph)	2,760 kg (6,085 lb)
120 kWh NMC CATL	628 kg (1,385 lb)	160 kW YS210XYA03 induction	227 kW QT67TZ210D01 PMSM	519 hp (387 kW; 526 PS)	597 N⋅m (440 lb⋅ft)	—	775 km (482 mi)	4.93 s	215 km/h (134 mph)	2,870 kg (6,327 lb)

== Sales ==
The V8 received over 8,200 pre-orders 72 hours after they opened on 28 September 2026. The V8 received 2,216 orders within 2 hours of launching on 20 November 2026.
