= Harmony Intelligent Mobility Alliance =

Intelligent automotive alliance by Chinese multinational technology company Huawei

- Product type: Automotive
- Current owner: Huawei
- Country: China
- Introduced: 2021; 5 years ago (as 智选车业务); November 2023; 3 years ago (as HIMA)
- Related brands: AITO (Seres); Luxeed (Chery); Stelato (BAIC BluePark); Maextro (JAC); SAIC (SAIC Motor)
- Markets: China
- Ambassador: Yu Chengdong (Chairman of Huawei Device BG)
- Website: hima.auto

Harmony Intelligent Mobility Alliance (Chinese: 鸿蒙智能汽车技术生态联盟; pinyin: Hóngméng Zhìnéng Qìchē Jìshù Shēngtài Liánméng), trading as HIMA (Chinese: 鸿蒙智行; pinyin: Hóngméng Zhìxíng) is an automotive alliance and sales network initiated and led by Chinese multinational technology company Huawei. The members of the alliance include AITO (Seres Group), Luxeed (Chery), Stelato (BAIC BluePark), Maextro (JAC Group) and SAIC (SAIC Motor).

Under HIMA, Huawei contributes in product planning, design, marketing, user experience, quality control and provides intelligent vehicle software and hardware for the traditional automobile manufacturers. Currently, HIMA only operates in mainland China.

== History ==
=== ZhixuanCars establishment ===
In December 2021, Huawei announced the launch of AITO brand and unveiled its first vehicle AITO M5, the first vehicle Huawei developed with Seres Group. The model is based on Seres SF5 SUV. At that time, Seres managed the entire vehicle lifecycle, encompassing research and development, manufacturing, and after-sales services. Huawei contributed to product definition, development, and channel sales. Both companies collaborated on quality control and marketing efforts. In 2023, Huawei expanded its role to include after-sales services and vehicle deliveries, working alongside Seres.

In March 2023, AITO was briefly rebranded as "Huawei AITO" before Huawei reverted the rebranding. In June 2023, Huawei acquired the AITO trademark in Chinese language (问界/Wenjie) from Seres Group. Huawei returned the English AITO trademarks and related patents back to Seres Group in July 2024 for 2.5 billion RMB, citing Chinese regulations requiring automobile brands to be owned by their manufacturers.

=== HIMA establishment ===
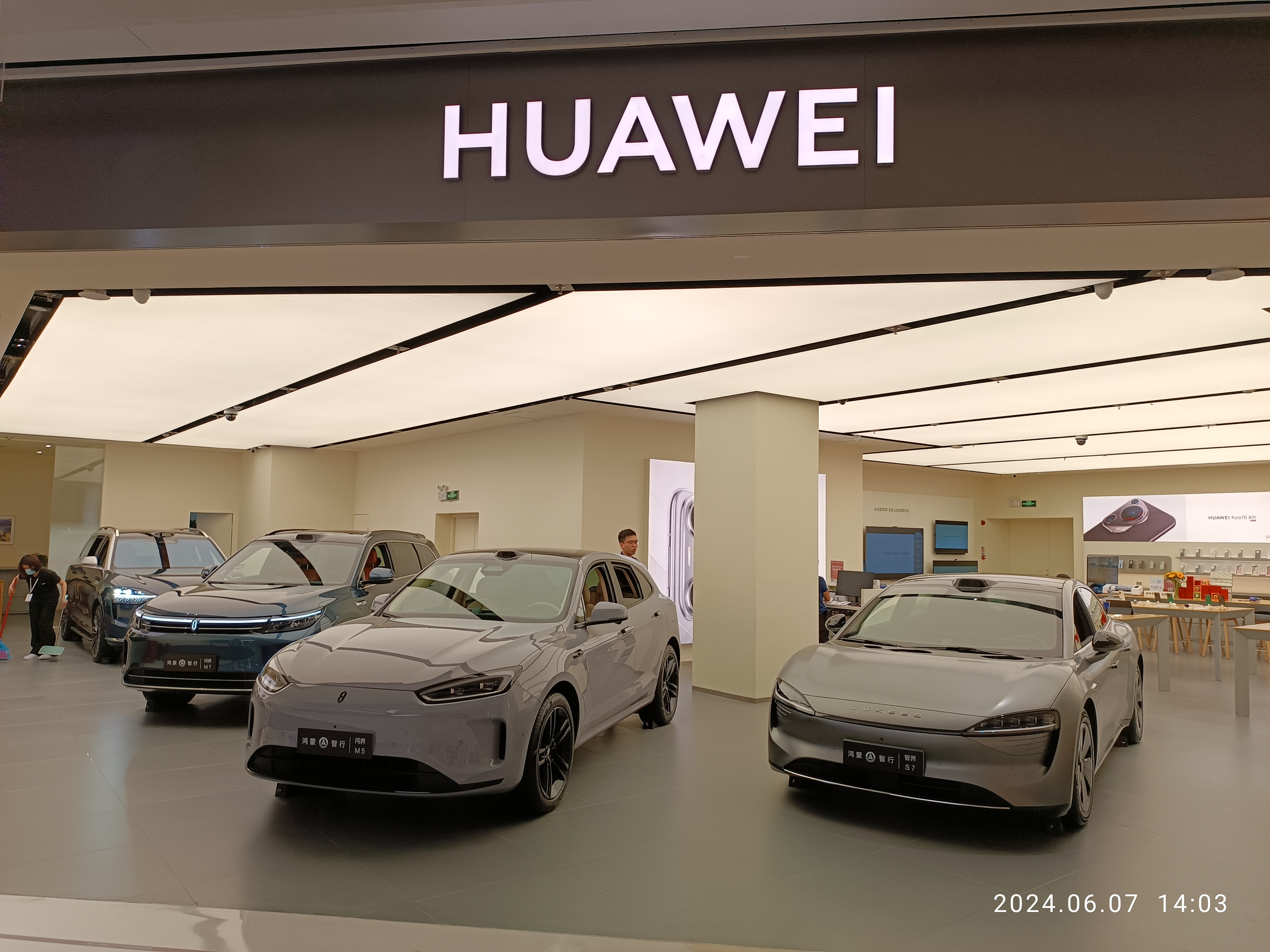
A Huawei store in Shenzhen displaying four HIMA vehicles alongside its electronic products

On 9 November 2023, at the pre-sale launch event for the Luxeed S7, Huawei announced that it would upgrade its ZhixuanCars business to the "Harmony Intelligent Mobility Alliance" (HIMA). Unlike the previous approach, where Huawei mainly provided sales channels and had control over vehicle development with its partners, HIMA aims to build a more connected ecosystem for electric vehicles by incorporating Huawei's Harmony operating system into the cars. HIMA will allow closer cooperation with partners to create a unified smart mobility platform, focusing more on system integration and joint development across different manufacturers.

In December 2023, Huawei transferred several trademarks under the name "Stelato" to BAIC BluePark, the HIMA brand developed in collaboration with BAIC.

In July 2024, Yu Chengdong (Richard Yu), Chairman of Huawei Consumer BG and Intelligent Automotive Solutions BU, revealed in an interview that the fourth HIMA brand, developed in collaboration with JAC Group, would be named Zunjie (尊界) in Chinese. In August 2024, during the Stelato S9 and Huawei new product launch event, Huawei officially introduced Maextro, the fourth brand under the HIMA collaboration with JAC. The first vehicle of Maextro, Maextro S800 is expected to roll off the production line by the end of 2024 and launch on 30 May 2025.

In April 2025, SAIC Motor jointly unveiled the fifth brand under HIMA, SAIC (dubbed "尚界" in Chinese), during the HIMA new product launch event.

In September 2026, HIMA and AITO jointly announced that AITO would take over the development, design, brand marketing, sales channel, and service system from Huawei, with Huawei participating only in part of the development work. This is a major change in the HIMA cooperation model since its establishment.

== Operations ==
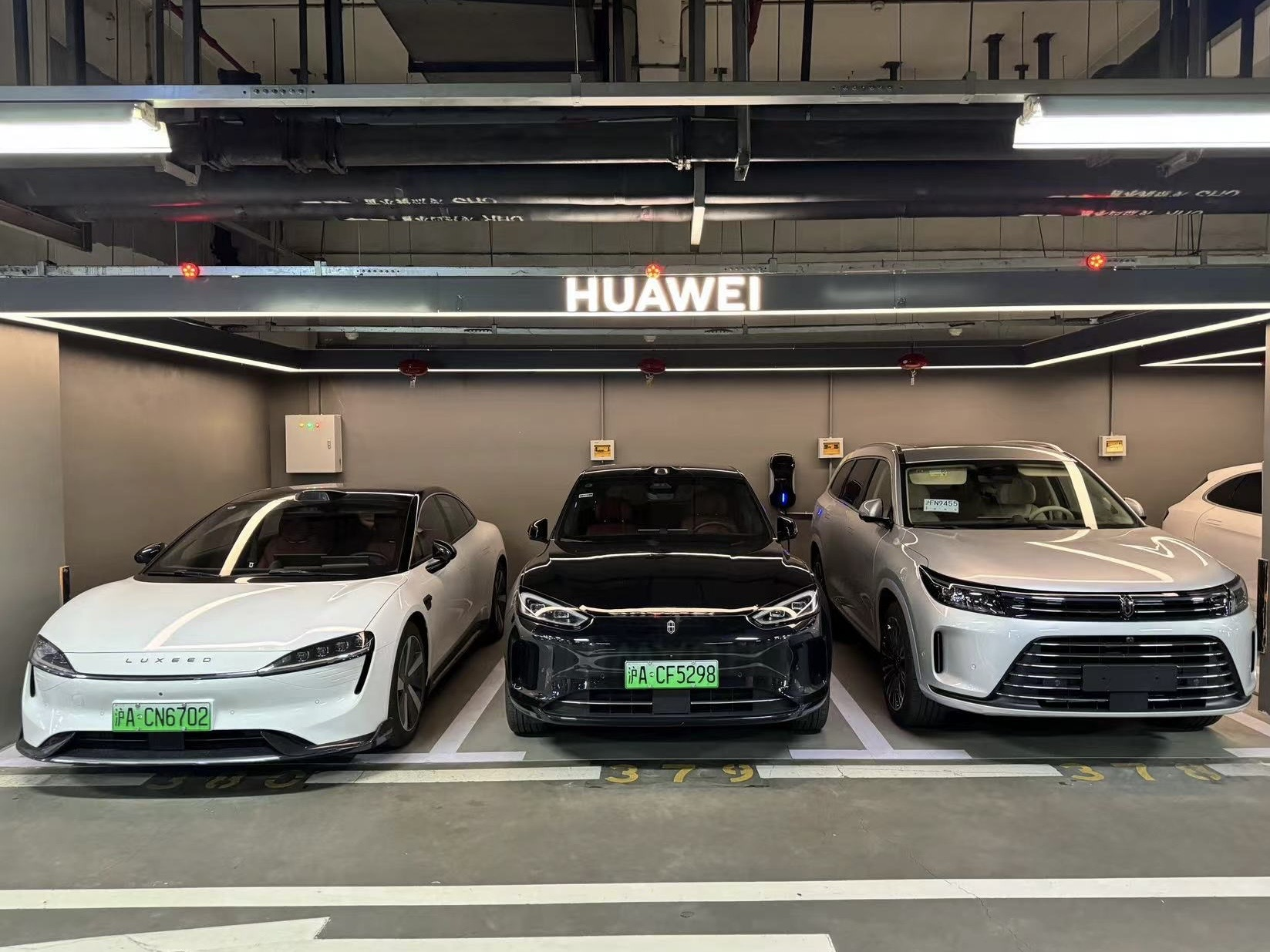
Three HIMA vehicles at a Huawei charging station

In the HIMA business model, Huawei does not directly manufacture cars but focuses on assisting car companies with product design, supply chain management, quality control, software ecosystem, user experience management, brand marketing, and sales channels. Under the alliance, each of Huawei's partner manufacturers will specialize in a certain vehicle category and class. Each manufacturer's product lineup will be non-overlapping, and all will be combined under Huawei's comprehensive solution.

Huawei has been establishing independent HIMA stores in the Chinese market. Huawei planned to have around 800 newly built HIMA stores by 2024, and plans to expand to 1,000 stores by 2025. By 2023, HIMA had already opened franchise outlets ("user centers") in 78 cities nationwide. These outlets provide integrated services, including sales, delivery, and after-sales support, embodying a one-stop-shop approach. One of the criteria for selecting partners is a preference for those with expertise in luxury car sales and maintenance (both mechanical and paint). In addition to opening new franchise user centers, the existing outlets were rebranded from "AITO" to "HIMA" as the outlets started offering Luxeed, Stelato and Maextro vehicles.

== Technology ==
=== Huawei ADS ===
AITO vehicles are equipped with ADS (Autonomous Driving System) developed by Huawei. For ADS 2.0, current in 2023, it was a composite of 128 LiDARs, 11 HD cameras, 3 MMW radars, and 12 ultra sonic radars and Huawei self-developed chipset. The ADS is trained on real-world driving data and can achieve Level 2+ autonomous driving. It can perform human-like judgment and operation such as accurate turning, giving way to pedestrians, recognizing and avoiding irregular obstacles, as well as detecting and avoiding animals. It can also perform automatic and valet parking. According to Huawei, the ADS 2.0 was priced at 36,000 RMB (~US$5200) per vehicle when sold to partner manufacturer.

Huawei upgraded ADS 4.1 in January 2026 with safety enhancements that include eAES "anti-sandwich" feature to prevent rare end collisions.

=== HarmonyOS Cockpit ===
The HarmonyOS Cockpit is Huawei's solution for electric and autonomous cars, augmented reality head-up displays (AR-HUD) and smart instrument cluster. Huawei opened up the APIs of HarmonyOS Cockpit to help automobile OEMs, suppliers and ecosystem partners in developing different features.

==== HarmonySpace ====
On December 21, 2021, Huawei launched a specialized HarmonyOS vehicle operating system called HarmonySpace. Over the years iterations developed. On April 22, 2025, HarmonySpace 5, also known as HarmonyOS Cockpit 5, was launched on final HarmonyOS 4.x dual-framework version, with Qiankun ADS 4.0 it includes AI models like DeepSeek and Pangu support integrated.

On January 20, 2026, it was announced Qiankun ADS 5.0 and specialized HarmonyOS 6 cockpit system version of HarmonySpace 6 planned for April 2026 launch. In April 2025, Huawei announced HarmonyOS NEXT native version of cockpit app pioneer program with a first batch of developer partners from iQIYI, Amap, Mango TV, Tencent Music in Chinese markets.

=== Tuling platform ===
Huawei Tuling platform is equipped with a multi-modal fusion perception system, DATS (Dynamic Adaptive Torque System) and xMotion intelligent body collaborative control system.

== Brands ==
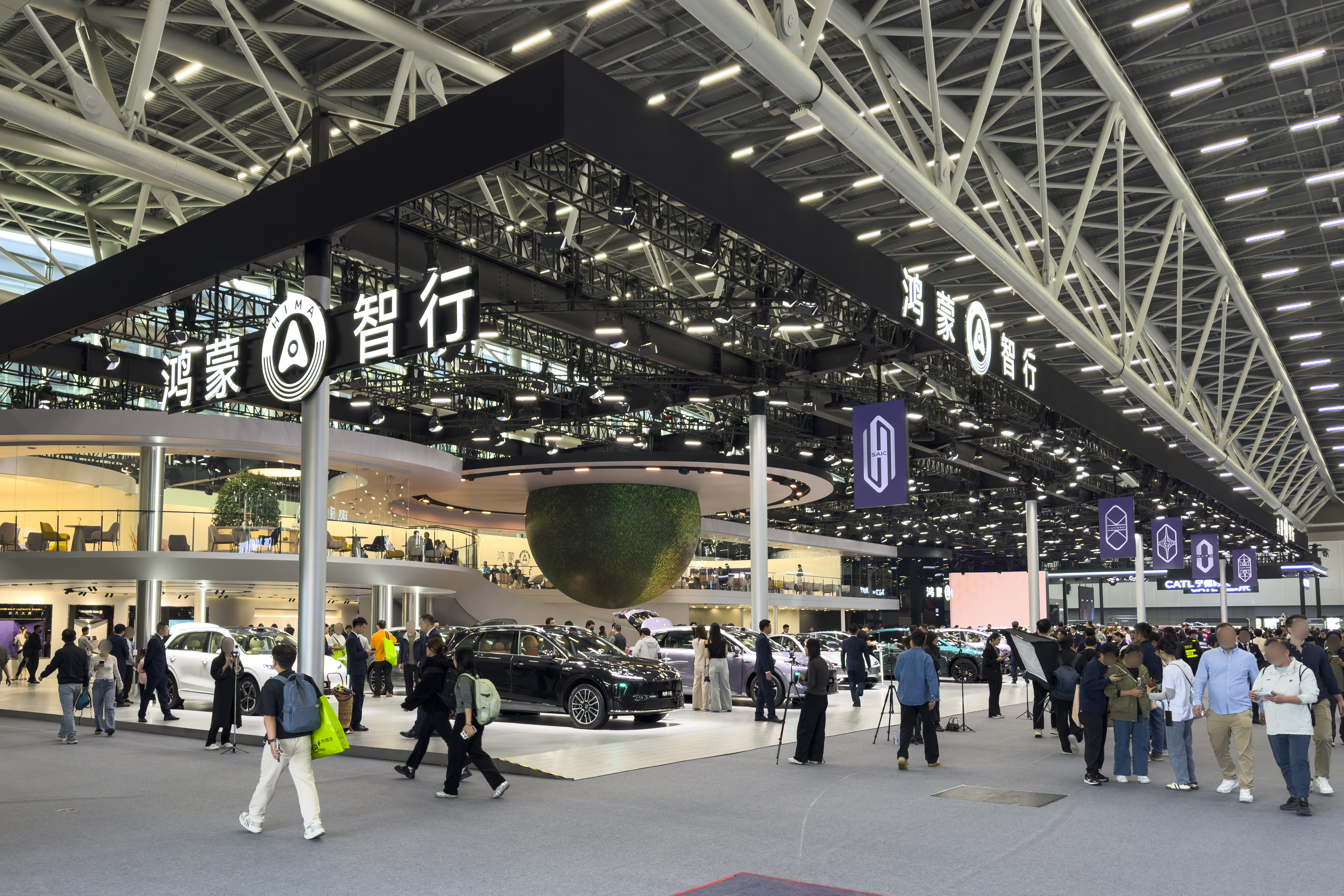
HIMA exhibit stands at Auto Guangzhou 2025

The brands of the alliance include AITO (Seres Group), Luxeed (Chery), Stelato (BAIC BluePark), Maextro (JAC Group) and SAIC (SAIC Motor). Although the Western names of each alliance brand are not closely related, their Chinese names are all named after the Chinese character "界", such as 问界; Wènjiè (AITO), 智界; Zhìjiè (Luxeed), 享界; Xiǎngjiè (Stelato), 尊界; Zūnjiè (Maextro) and 尚界; Shàngjiè (SAIC).

Originally, the ownership rights for the alliance brands' Western and Chinese names were separate. The Western trademarks are owned by the alliance manufacturers, whereas the Chinese trademarks are owned by Huawei. However, due to the regulations of Chinese government, that the brand of automobile must be owned by its manufacturer, in July 2024, Huawei announced to transfer the Chinese trademarks and patents of AITO brand to its partner Seres Group.

=== AITO ===
AITO (Chinese: 问界; pinyin: Wènjiè) is the brand used for HIMA models that are produced by Seres Group. Established in December 2021, it is the oldest of the five brands, and has four products on sale; the AITO M5, AITO M6, AITO M7, AITO M8 and AITO M9, which are all SUVs. Since September 2026, AITO took over the development, design, brand marketing, sales channel, and service system from Huawei,

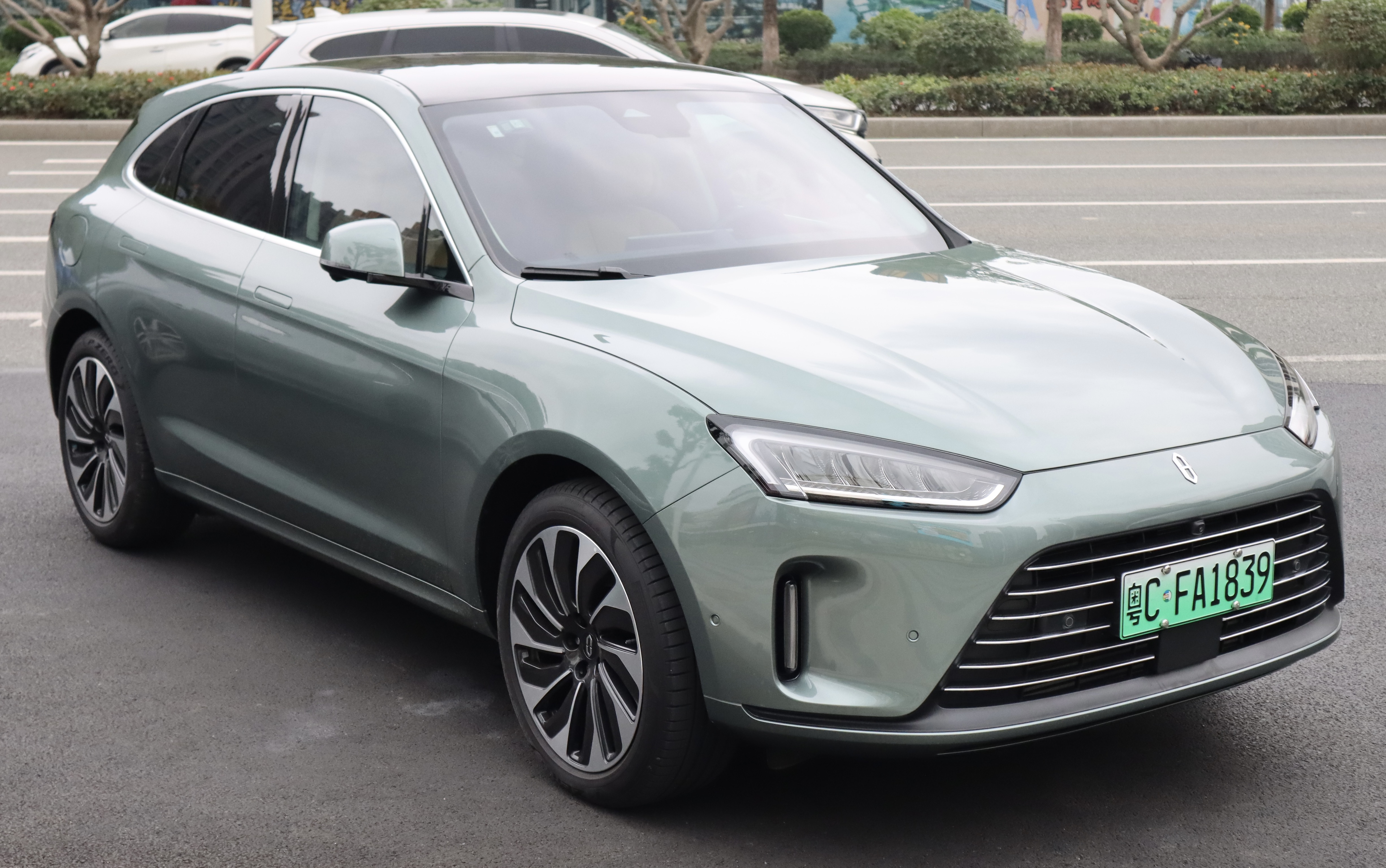
AITO M5

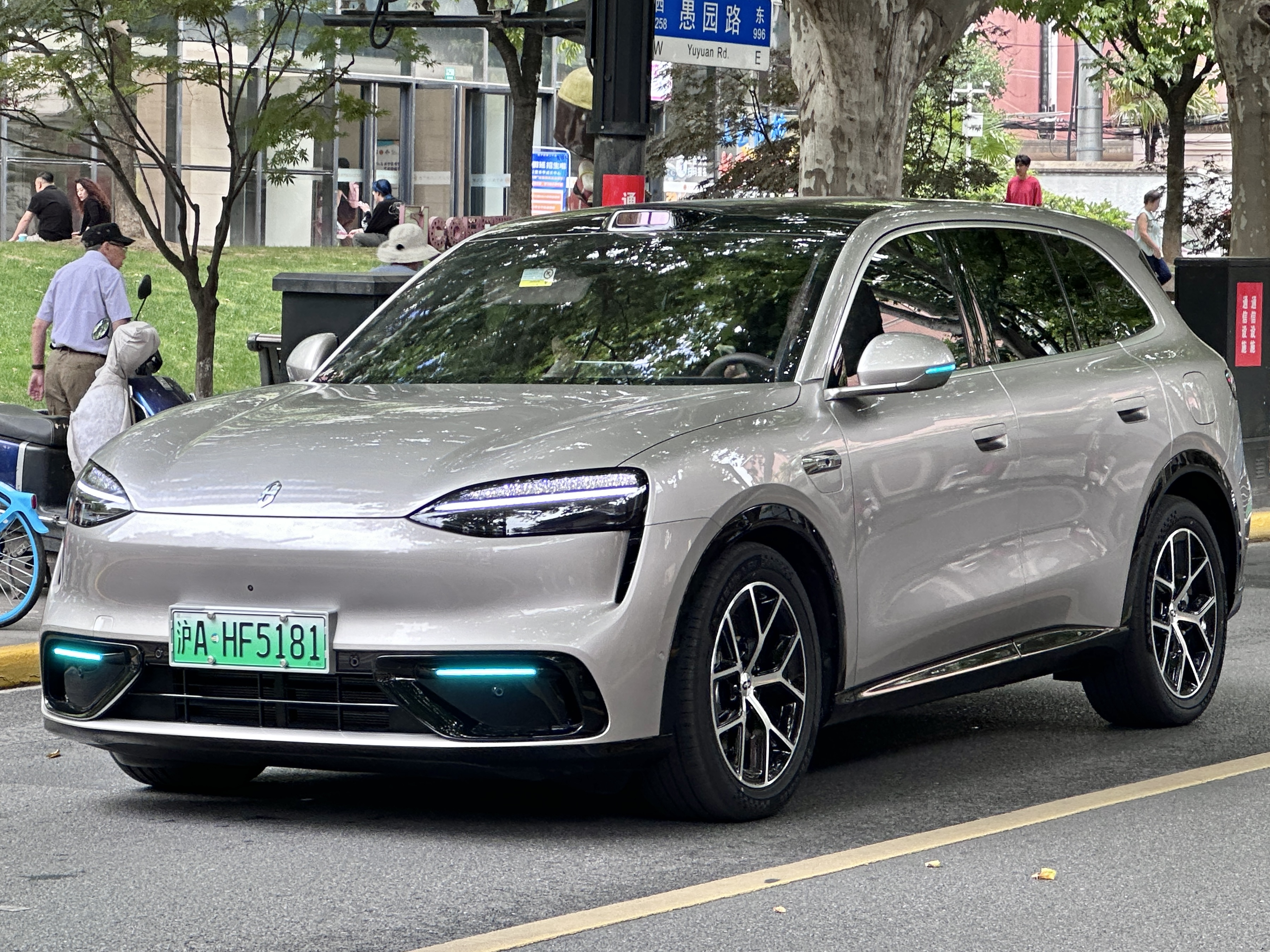
AITO M6

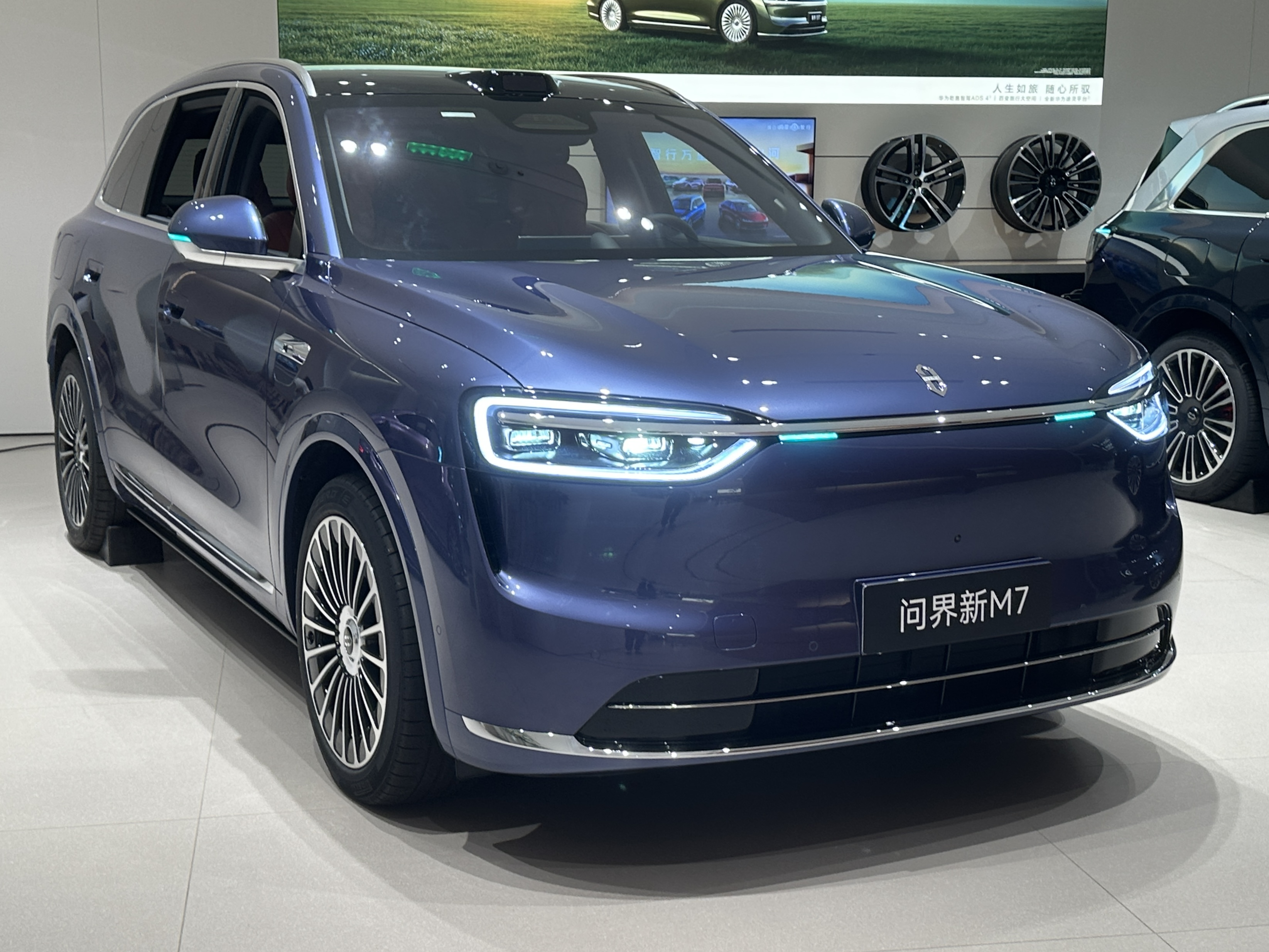
AITO M7

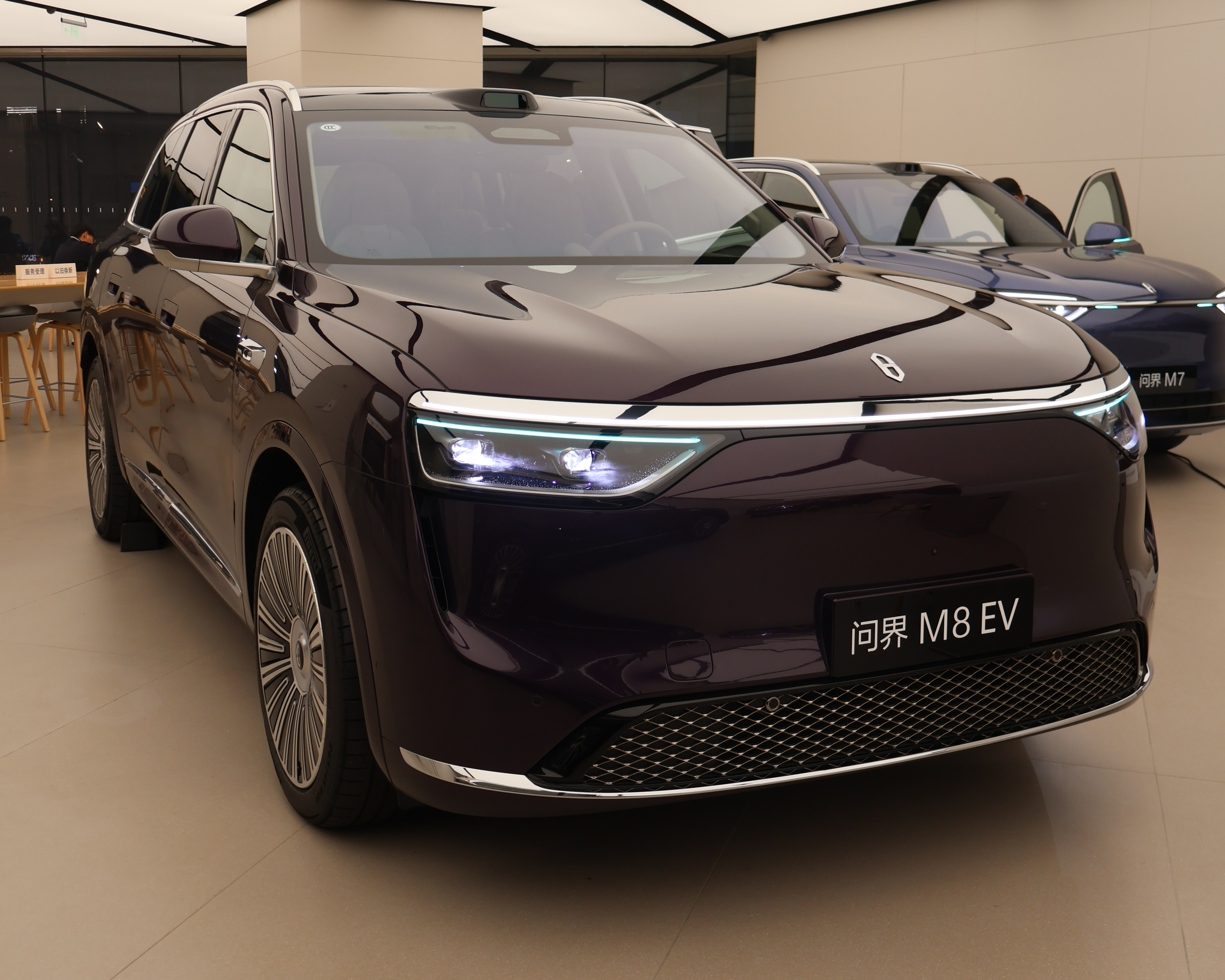
AITO M8

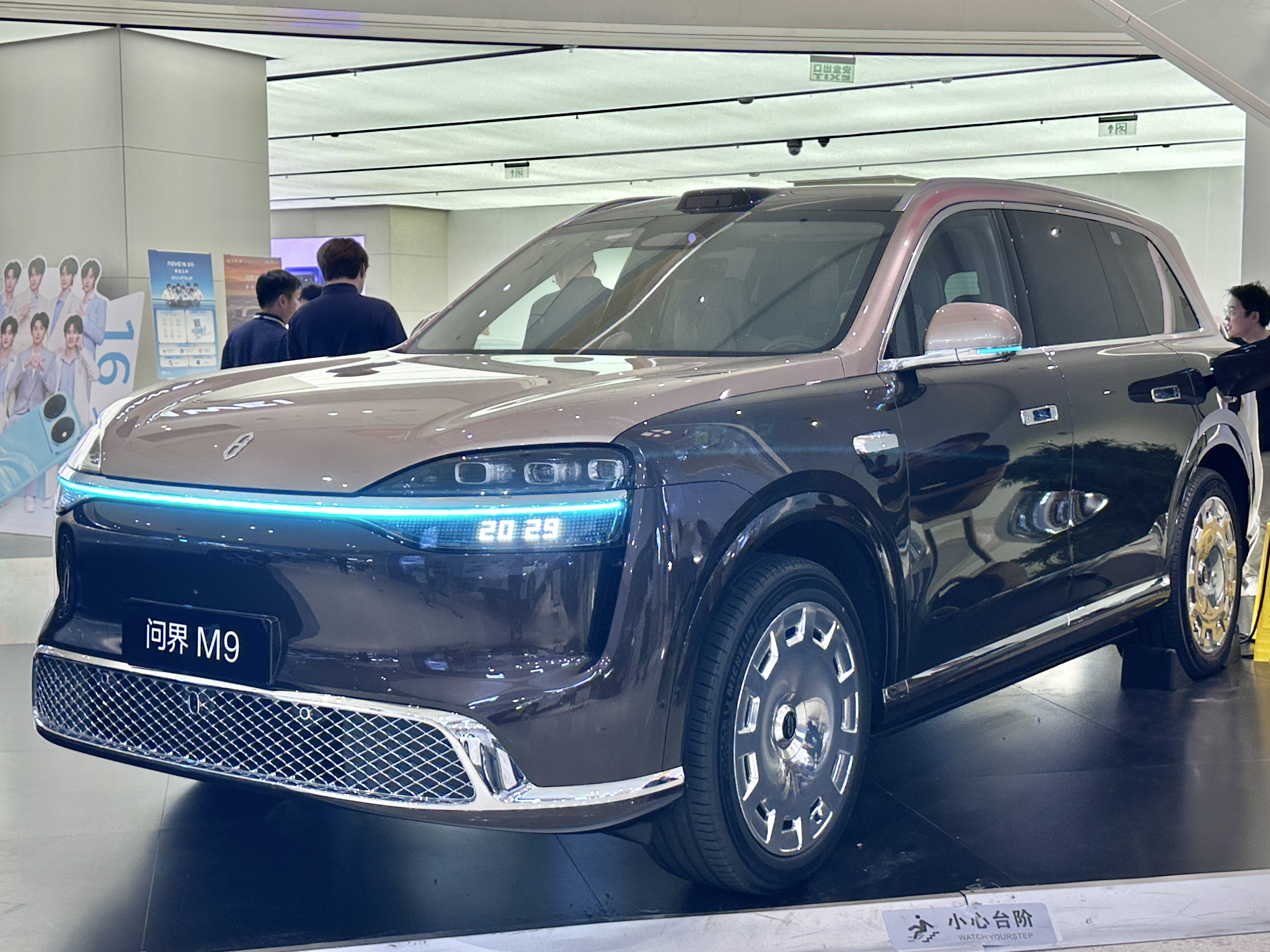
AITO M9

=== Luxeed ===
Luxeed (Chinese: 智界; pinyin: Zhìjiè) is the brand used for HIMA models that are produced by Chery. Established in November 2023, it has four products on sale; the Luxeed S7, Luxeed R7, Luxeed RX and Luxeed V9.

Luxeed S7

Luxeed R7

Luxeed RX

Luxeed V9

=== Stelato ===
Stelato (Chinese: 享界; pinyin: Xiǎngjiè) is the brand used for HIMA models that are produced by BAIC BluePark, a subsidiary of BAIC Group. Established in December 2023, it has three products on sale; the Stelato S9, Stelato S9T, Stelato G9 and Stelato V8.

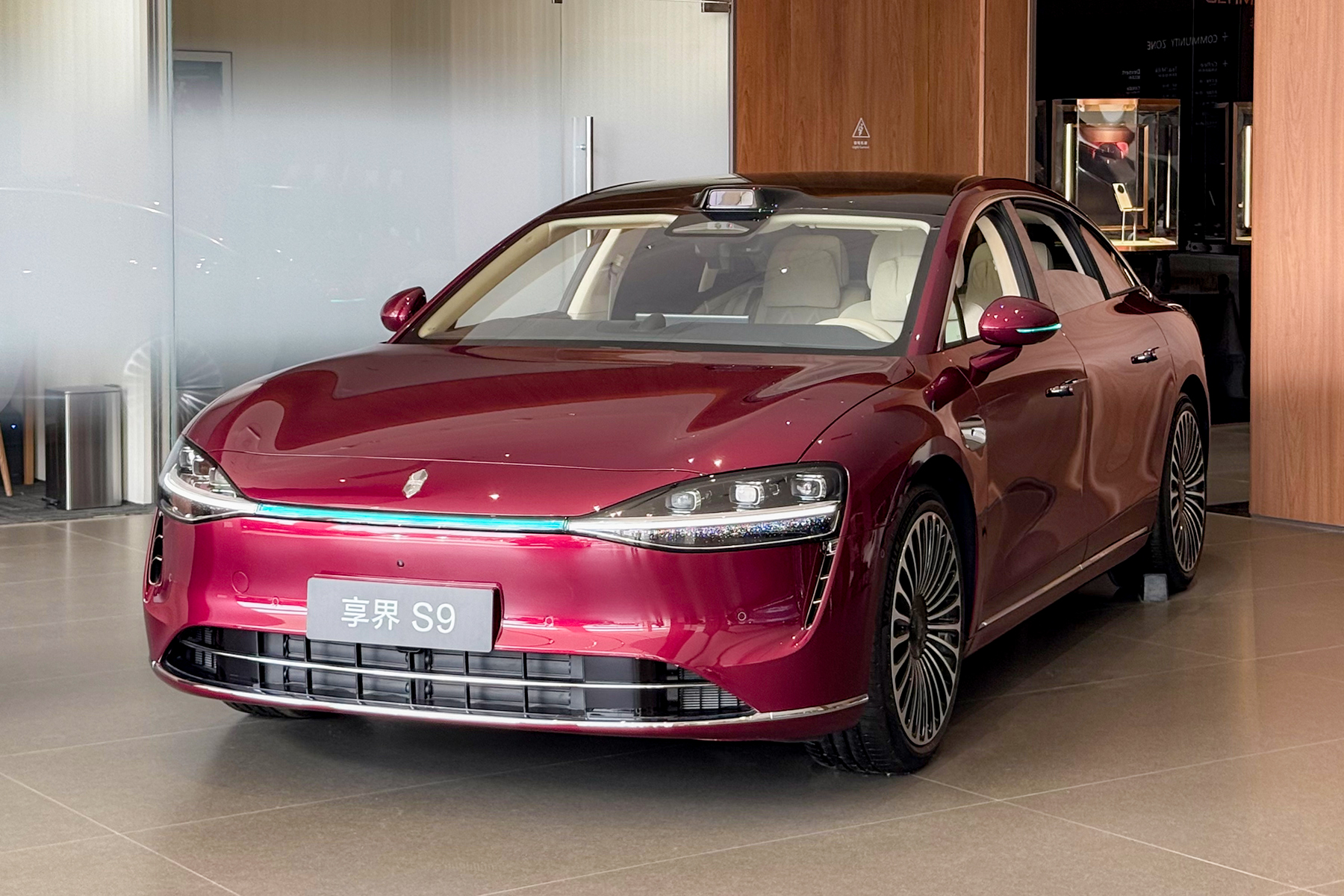
Stelato S9

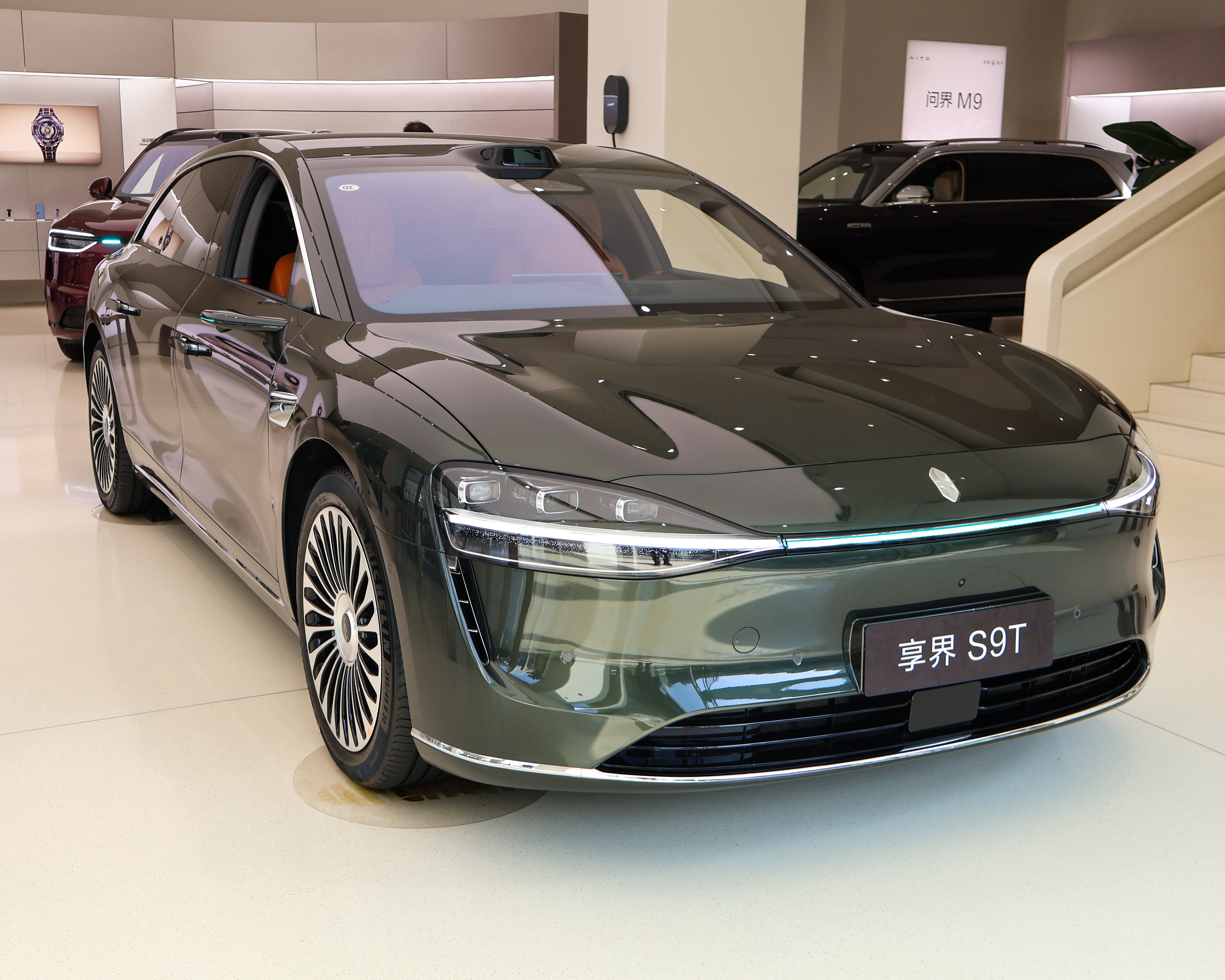
Stelato S9T

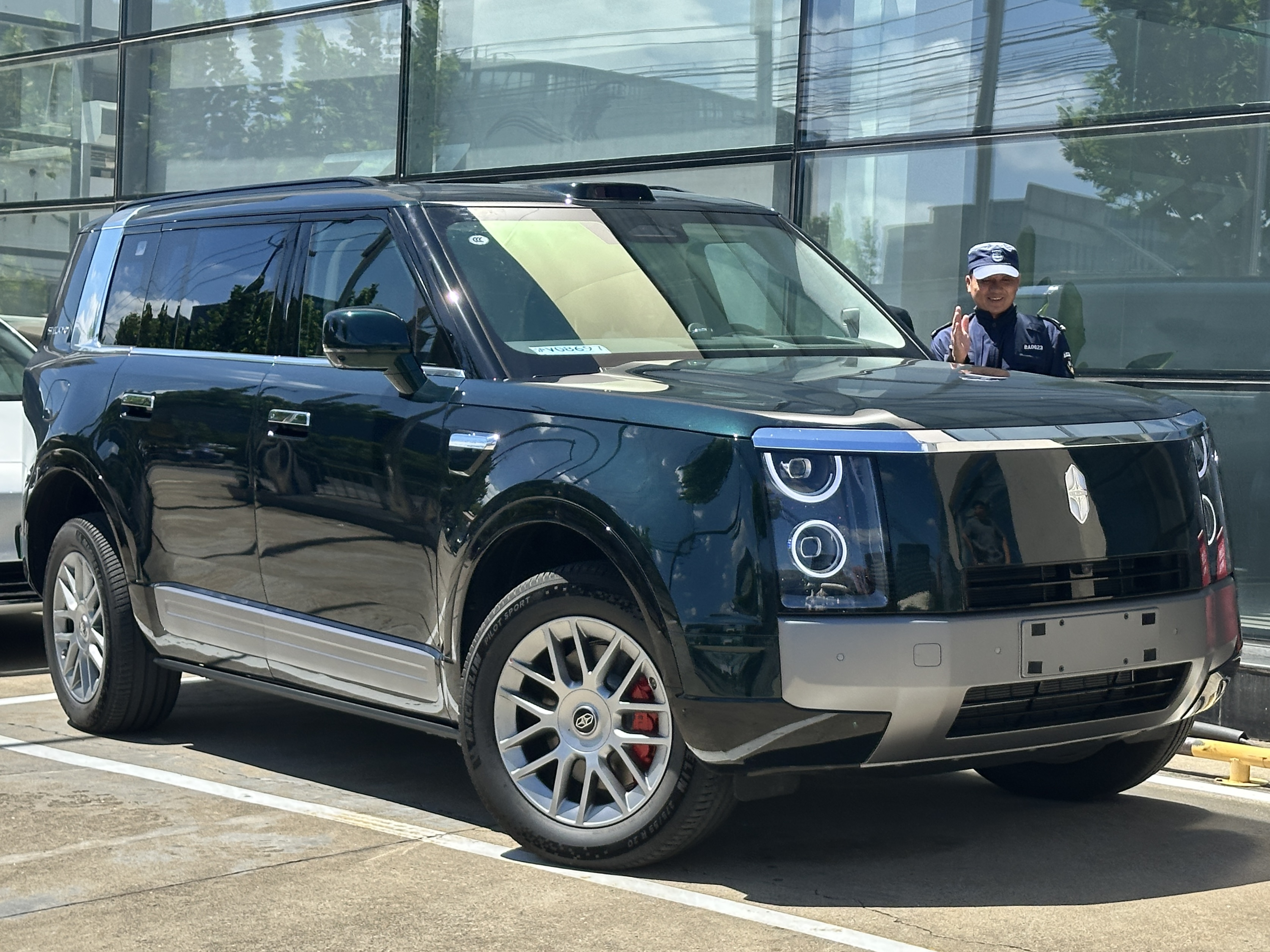
Stelato G9

Stelato V8

=== Maextro ===
Maextro (Chinese: 尊界; pinyin: Zūnjiè) is the brand used for HIMA models that are produced by JAC Group. Established in November 2024, it has three products on sale; the Maextro S800 and Maextro V800/V680, which is the most expensive HIMA vehicle.

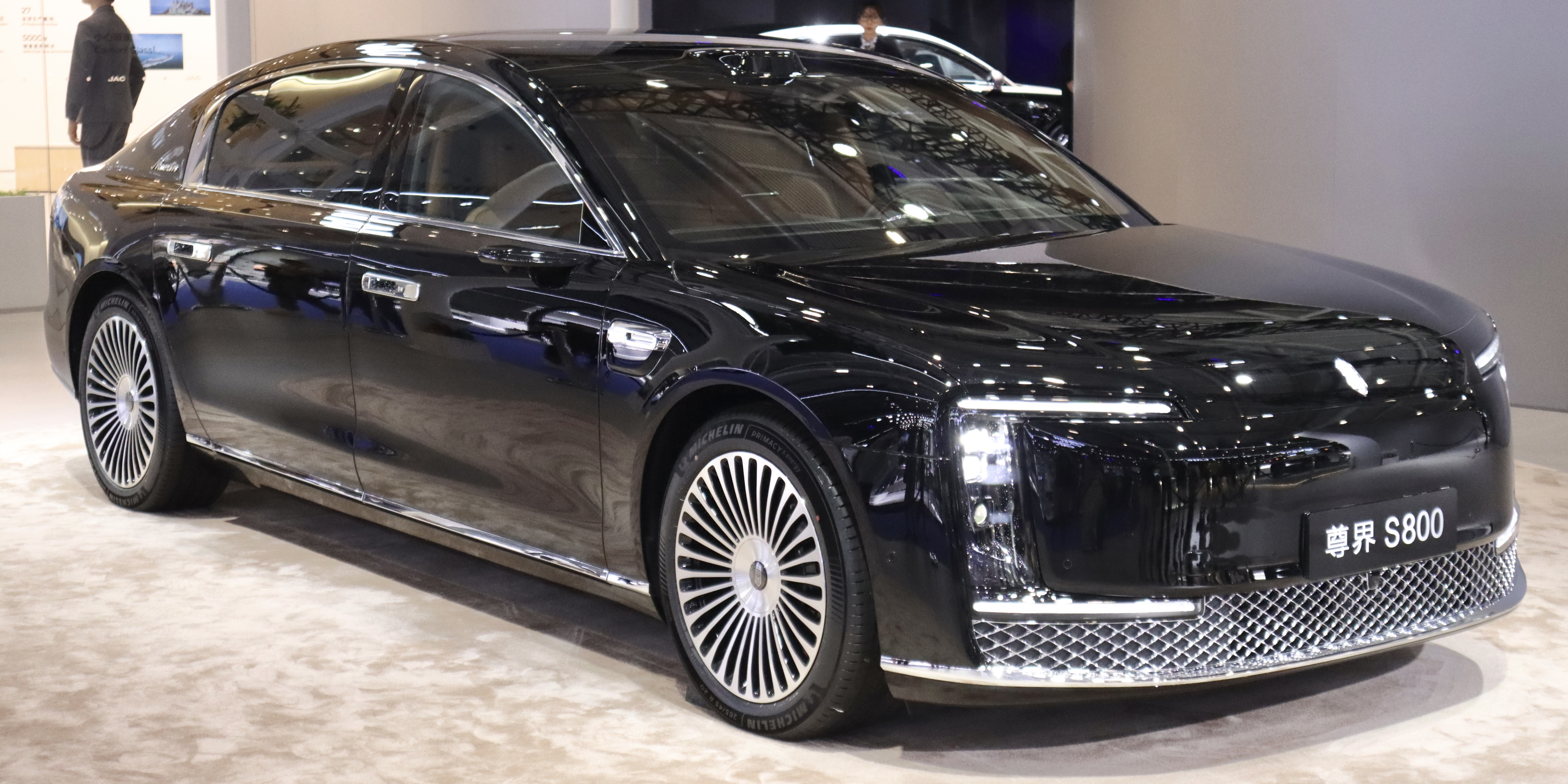
Maextro S800

Maextro V800

=== SAIC ===
SAIC (Chinese: 尚界; pinyin: Shàngjiè) is the brand used for HIMA models that are produced by SAIC Motor. Established in April 2025, it has three products on sale; the SAIC H5 and SAIC Z7/Z7T. which is the cheapest HIMA vehicle.

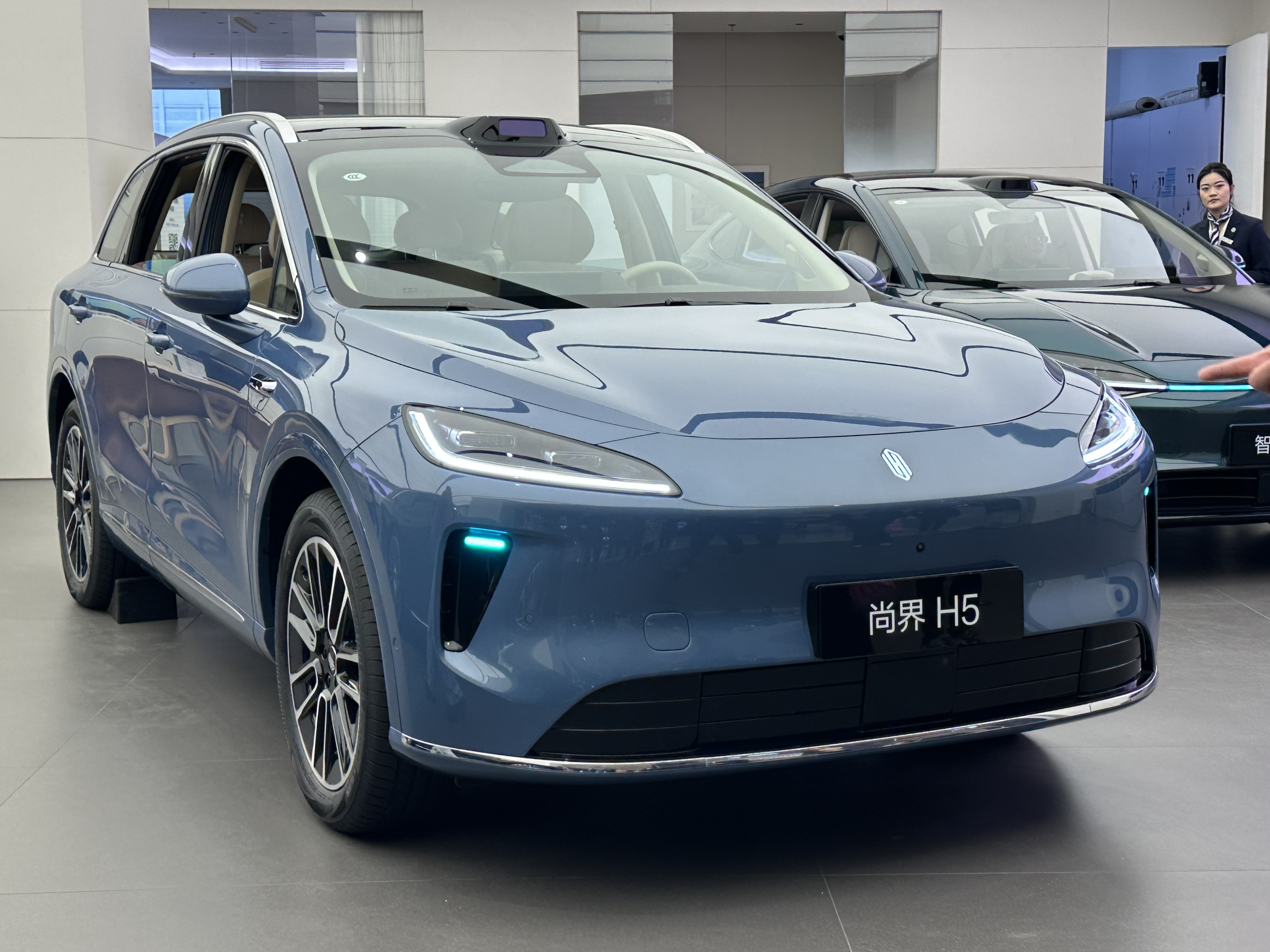
SAIC H5

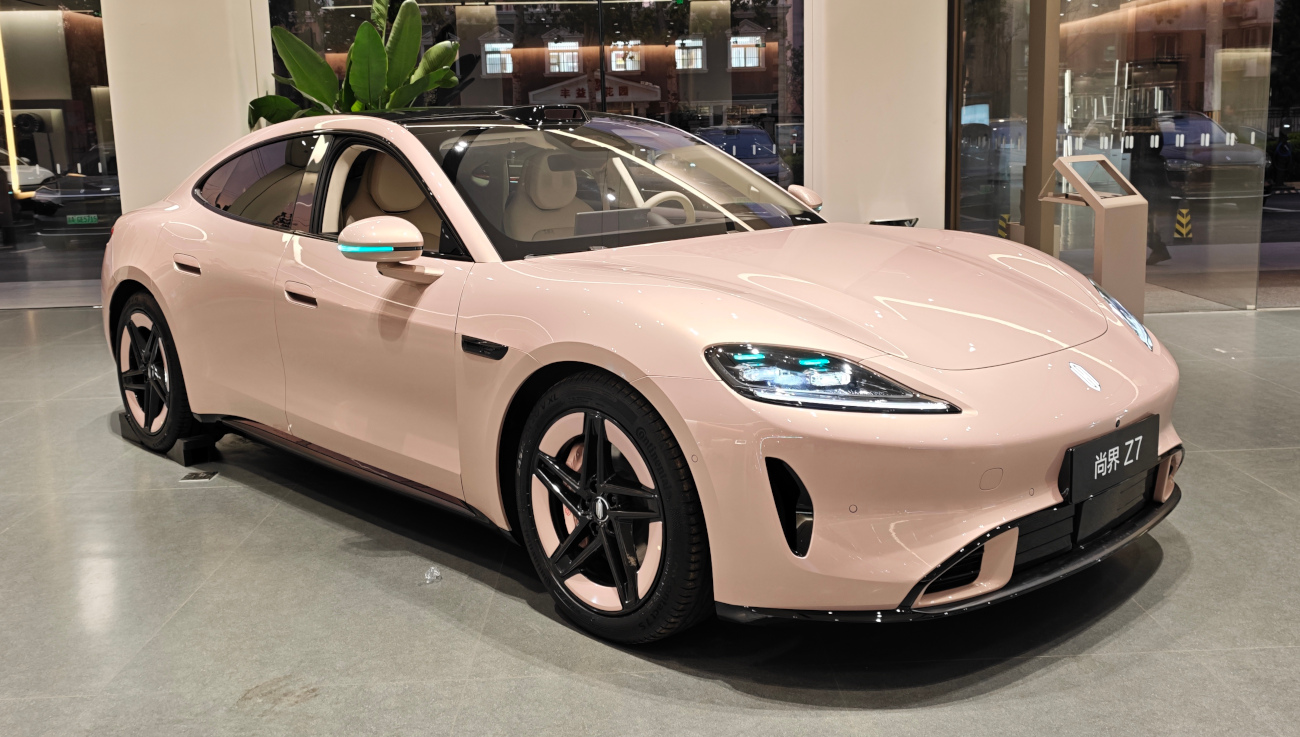
SAIC Z7

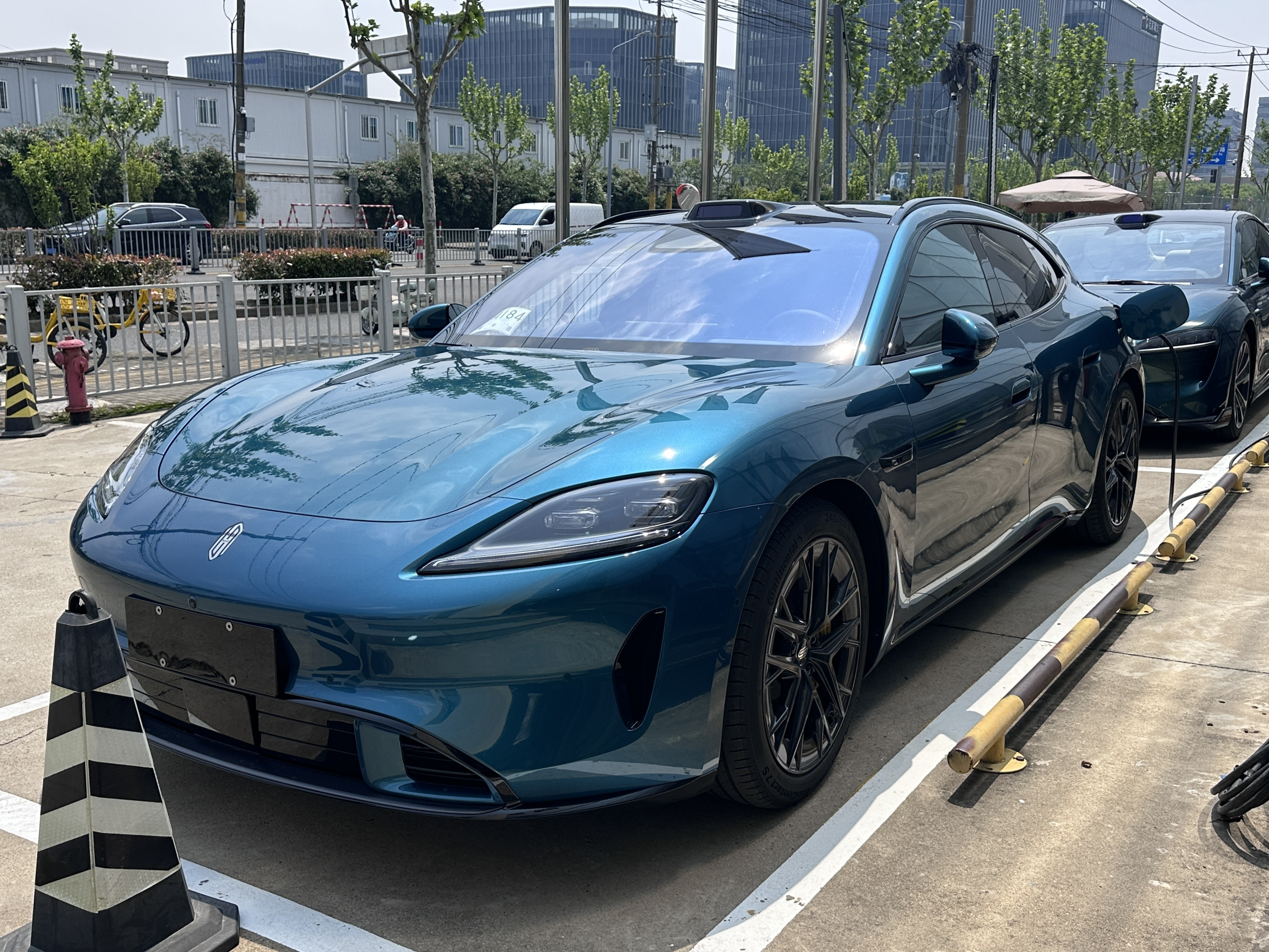
SAIC Z7T

== Brand Ambassadors ==
- Brand Ambassador of HIMA and AITO M9: Yu Hewei and Huang Bo (2024-present)
- Brand Ambassador of Stelato: Yang Mi and Shen Teng
- Brand Ambassador of SAIC: Xiao Zhan

== Sales ==
In October 2025, with the delivery of a Stelato S9T to the user, the cumulative delivery volume of the Harmony Intelligence Mobility Alliance exceeded One million units, which took 43 months.

In August 2026, Harmony Intelligent Mobility Alliance had achieved a cumulative delivery milestone of over 1,500,000 vehicles—setting a record for the fastest achievement of this scale among Chinese New-force automotive brands, accomplished in just 53 months.

Sales of HIMA brands
Year	Total	AITO	Luxeed	Stelato	Maextro	SAIC
2022	76,180	76,180	-	-	-	-
2023	95,279	94,380	899	-	-	-
2024	444,956	386,907	57,956	4,232	-	-
2025	589,107	422,916	90,493	37,593	11,300	25,814
2026Q1	112,709	75,069	9,547	13,114	4,503	10,476
2026Q2	129,507	87,671	10,158	7,930	2,678	21,070

Since HIMA is not considered as an automobile manufacturer by the government of China, the sales figures of each HIMA brand is overlapping with its partner manufacturers.

=== Delivery milestones ===
- 1,000,000 vehicles – October 2025
- 1,500,000 vehicles – August 2026

== See also ==
=== Huawei's partnership with automobile manufacturers ===
Huawei's partnership with automobile manufacturers has taken the form of three models, the standardized parts supply model, the "Huawei Inside" (HI) model, and the Harmony Intelligent Mobility Alliance (HIMA).

- Tier 1 — Harmony Intelligent Mobility Alliance (HIMA), Huawei provides a complete set of vehicle solutions and participates in product definition, design, marketing, user experience, quality control and delivery, while the manufacturers are responsible for vehicle manufacturing.
- Tier 2 — Huawei Inside (HI), Huawei provide full-stack smart car solution and Huawei's smart cockpit to car manufacturers. In this mode, Huawei empowers vehicle intelligence through the supply of both software and hardware, but does not participate in the design, development, and marketing of the vehicles. Arcfox is currently adopting this model.
- Tier 2 — Huawei Inside Plus (HI Plus), with Avatr becoming the first company to invest in Yinwang, the Avatr's previous "HI"(Huawei Inside) model has been further upgraded to a new "HI Plus" model, enabling Huawei to get more deeply involved in Avatr's product definition.
- Tier 3 — Standardized parts supply, Huawei provides automobile parts and components like Lidar, electric motor, cameras and power management to car manufacturers, the most basic model.

=== Other articles ===
- List of Huawei products
- Seres Group
- Chery Automobile
- BAIC Group
- JAC Group
- SAIC Motor
- Automotive industry in China
- Plug-in electric vehicles in China
- Electric vehicle industry in China
- List of production battery electric vehicles
- Nio Inc.
- XPeng
- Li Auto
- Xiaomi Auto
