= Stelato S9 =

Full-size luxury sedan and station wagon

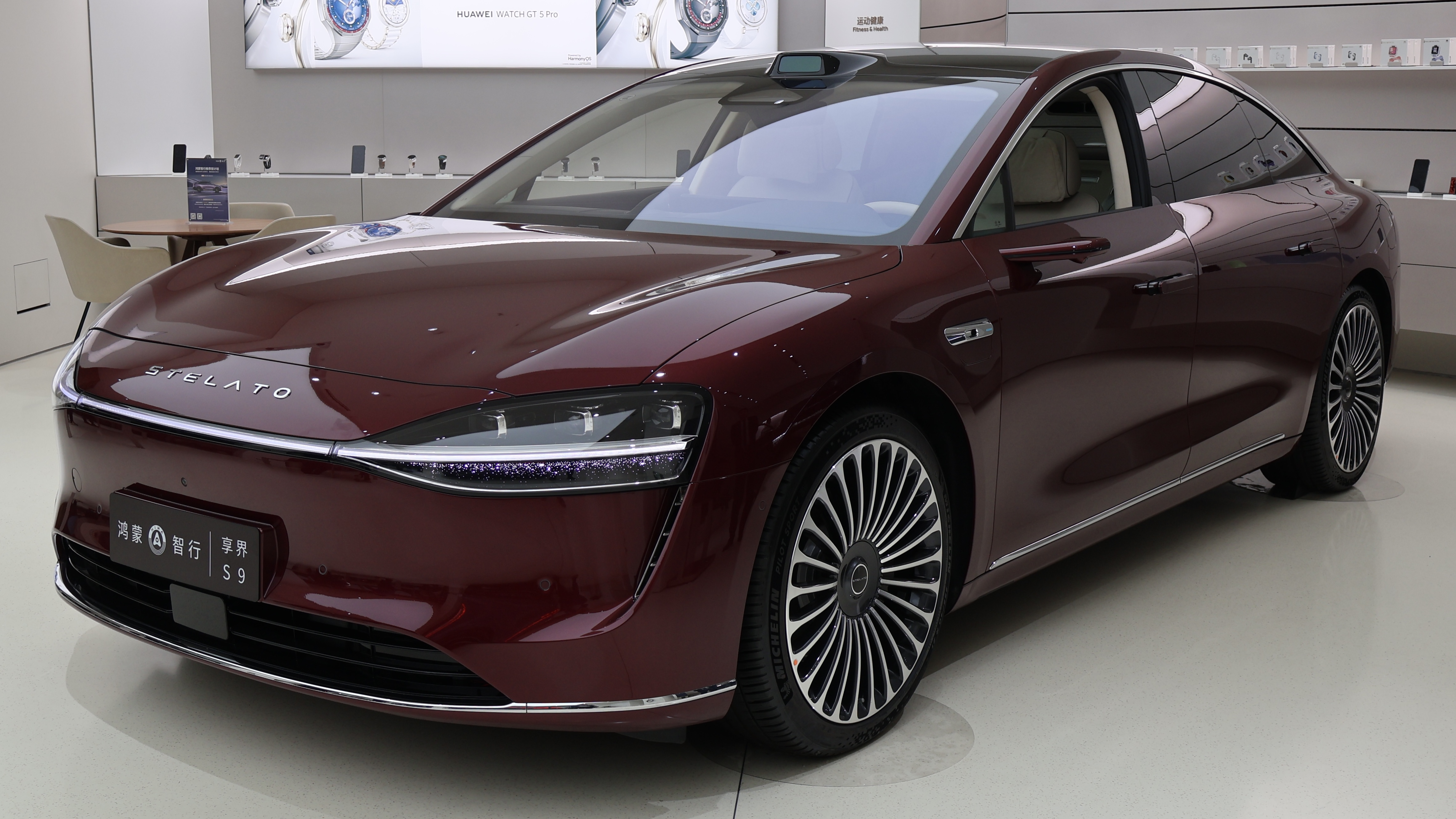

Overview
- Manufacturer: BAIC BluePark
- Model code: X4
- Also called: Stelato S9T (wagon)
- Production: 2024–present
- Assembly: China: Beijing (BJEV Stelato plant)

Body and chassis
- Class: Full-size luxury car (F)
- Body style: 4-door sedan; 5-door station wagon (S9T)
- Layout: Single-motor, rear-wheel-drive; Dual-motor, all-wheel-drive
- Platform: BE22/Polaris Architecture
- Related: Arcfox Wendao V9

Powertrain
- Engine: Gasoline range extender: 1.5 L A156T2H turbo I4
- Power output: 227–385 kW (304–516 hp; 309–523 PS)
- Hybrid drivetrain: Series hybrid
- Battery: 36 kWh LFP CATL; 51.9 kWh NMC CATL; 100 kWh NMC Whale CATL
- Range: 1,085–1,170 km (674–727 mi) WLTC (EREV)
- Electric range: 721–816 km (448–507 mi) CLTC (EV); 256–365 km (159–227 mi) CLTC (EREV); 204–290 km (127–180 mi) WLTC (EREV)

Dimensions
- Wheelbase: 3,050 mm (120.1 in)
- Length: 5,160 mm (203.1 in)
- Width: 1,987 mm (78.2 in) (EV); 2,005 mm (78.9 in) (EREV)
- Height: 1,486 mm (58.5 in); 1,492 mm (58.7 in) (S9T)
- Curb weight: 2,246–2,355 kg (4,952–5,192 lb)

The Stelato S9 (Chinese: 享界S9; pinyin: Xiǎngjiè S9) is a battery electric and range extender full-size luxury sedan and station wagon manufactured by BAIC BluePark under the Stelato brand in collaboration with HIMA, Huawei's multi-brand automotive alliance. A wagon variant called the Stelato S9T was first revealed in July 2025.

== History ==
On May 31, 2024, Stelato S9 was announced at the AITO M7 Ultra facelift launch conference.

On August 6, 2024, the S9's pricing was announced at Huawei's new product launch conference. The S9 is divided into two configuration versions: Max and Ultra.

Pre-sales for the range-extended version of the S9 began on March 20, 2025, with a starting price of 318,000 yuan. On April 16, 2025, the EREV version of the Stelato S9 was officially launched.

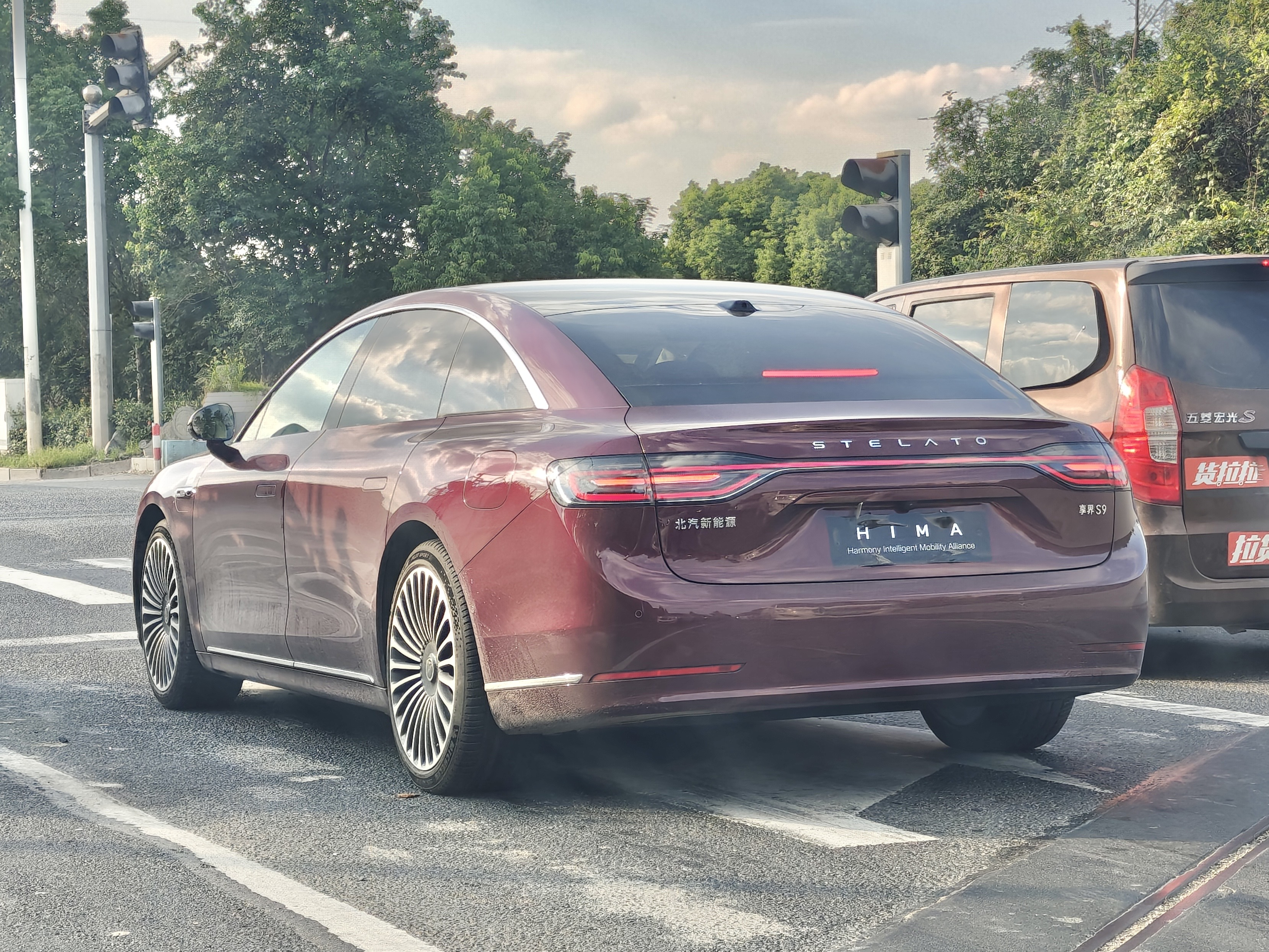
Rear view

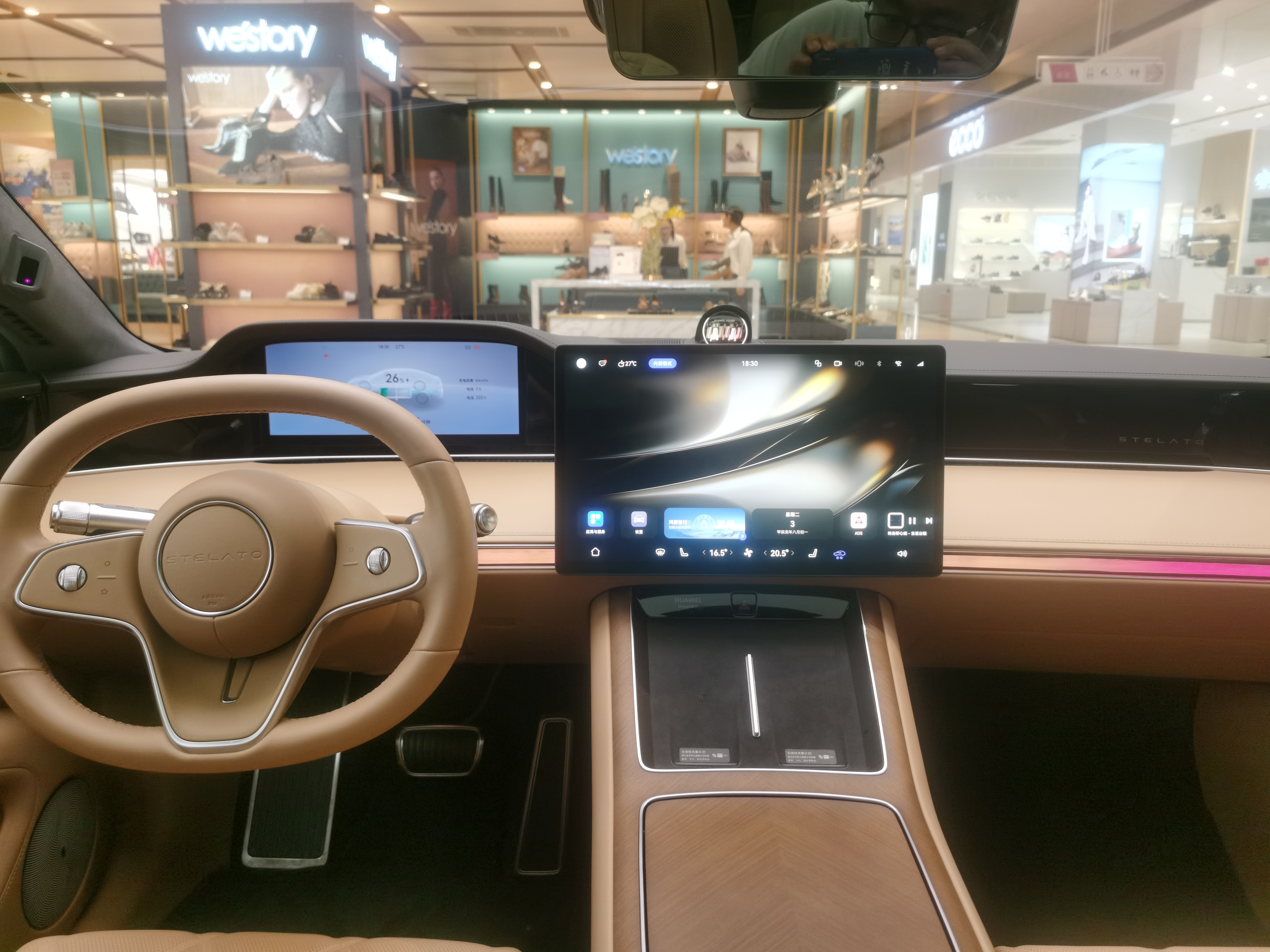
Interior

=== 2025 (facelift) ===
The facelifted S9 was revealed on November 7, 2025. It now uses Stelato's Universe Star logo instead of the wordmark on the front end. The forward-facing radar system has been upgraded to a three-distributed millimeter-wave radar matrix, and external microphones have been added. The back of the S9 now uses a Nebula design for the taillights. The facelifted S9 also uses 36 high-precision sensors and a standard four-lidar setup. The facelifted S9 was officially launched on November 20, 2025.

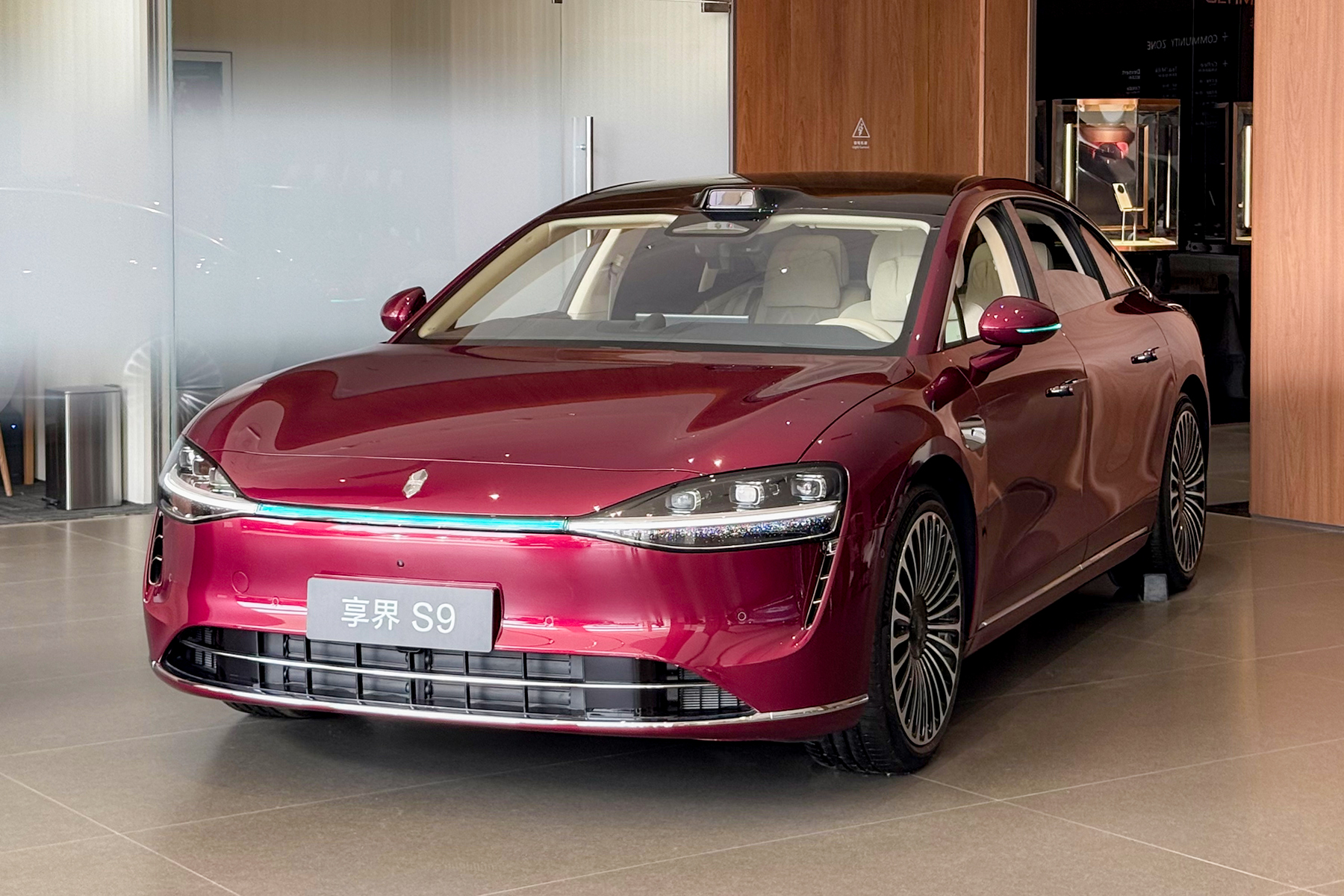
Stelato S9 2025 (facelift)

== Stelato S9T ==
On July 14, 2025, Stelato revealed the first images of the S9T, HIMA's first station wagon, with more details revealed 3 days later. Pre-orders for the variant opened on August 18 with both pure electric and range extender variants available.

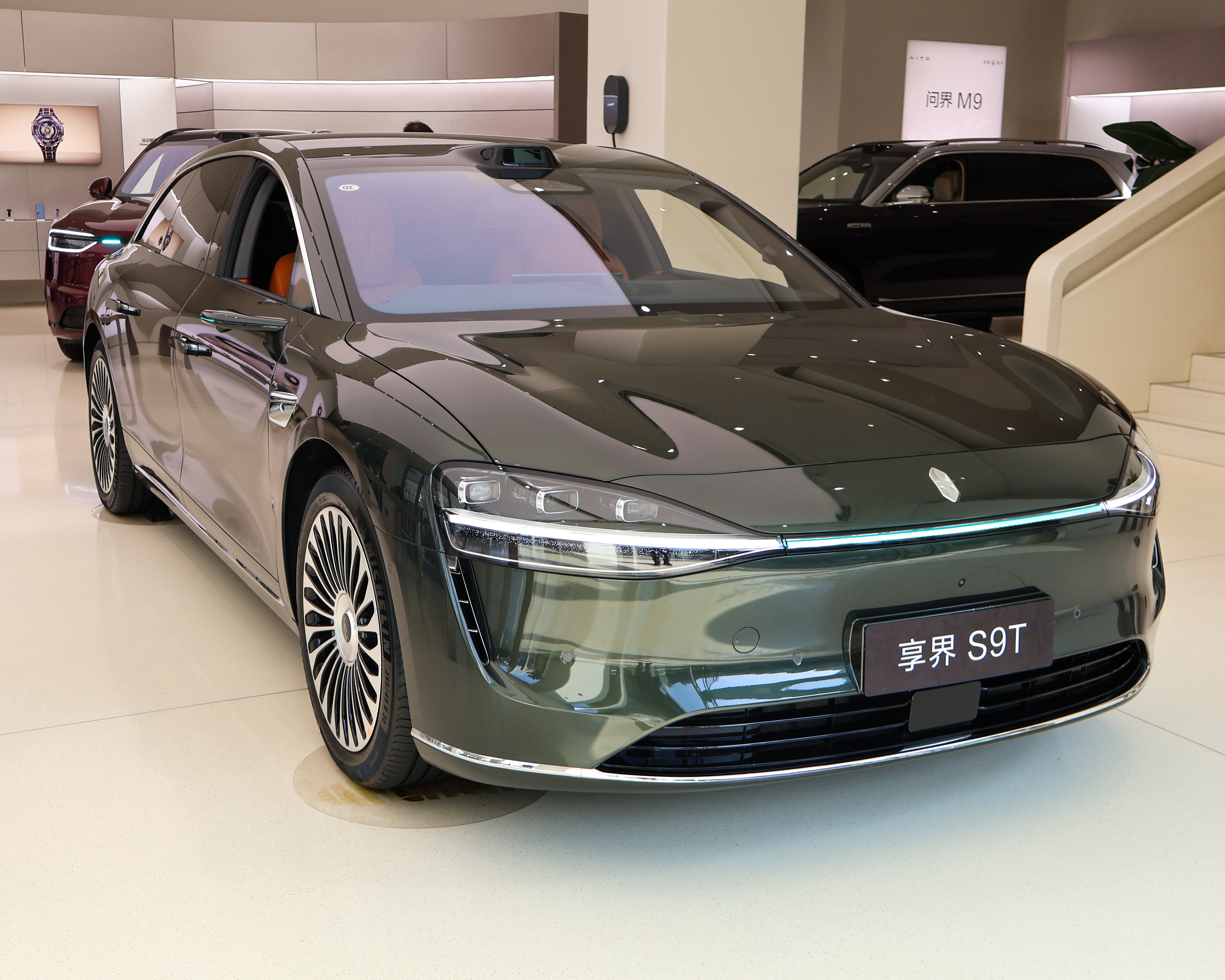
Stelato S9T

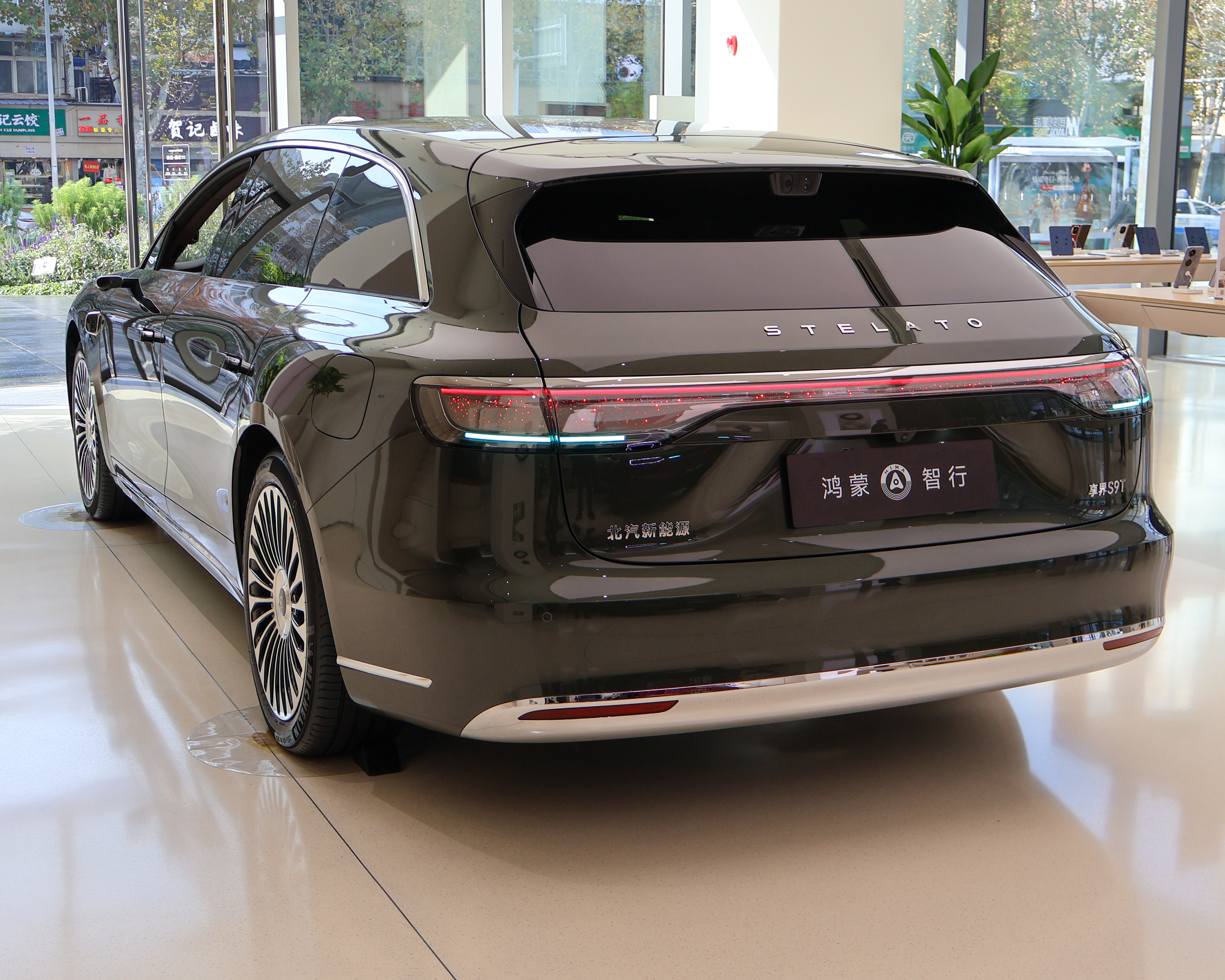
Rear view

== Specifications ==
The Stelato S9 is a full-size executive sedan based on Huawei Turing platform and BAIC's BE22 platform with a length of 5,160 mm (203.1 in) and a wheelbase of 3,050 mm (120.1 in).

The exterior features Huawei's xPixel adaptive headlights, with DRLs and taillights with a customizable star motif and a lightbar design. Stelato claims variants equipped with digital side mirrors has the lowest drag coefficient amongst luxury executive sedans at 0.193 C_{d}.

The S9's dashboard features a 12.3-inch digital instrument panel and a 15.6-inch central infotainment touchscreen running the HarmonyOS 4 operating system. The center console contains dual 50-watt wireless charging pads in the front and hidden cupholders. The rear passengers have access to a 13.2-inch control tablet mounted on the folding center armrest and a 32-inch retracting ceiling-mounted projector system. It features zero-gravity reclining seats that have heating, ventilation and massaging functions; additionally, the front passenger seat can fold to act as a footrest for the right-rear passenger. The S9 has a 378-litre (13.3 cu ft) trunk and a 38-litre (1.3 cu ft) frunk storage area.

The S9 is equipped with continuous damping control and an air suspension system. It is the first car to be equipped with Huawei's ADS 3.0 ADAS system, which features four Huawei LiDAR sensors including a 192-line front-facing unit with 250 metres (820 ft) of range, and five of Huawei's first 4D mmWave radars, which have four transmitter and receiver antennas and are capable of measuring the elevation dimension in addition to range, velocity and azimuth of typical mmWave radar units. Starting with the S9T, the vehicle was upgraded with the Huawei ADS 4 system in August 2025 using similar sensing hardware.

== Powertrain ==
The Stelato S9 is available in both pure electric and range-extender powertrains with single-motor rear-wheel drive and dual-motor all-wheel drive variants. Every model uses a 227 kW (304 hp; 309 PS) TZ210XYA03 Huawei DriveONE permanent magnet synchronous motor on the rear axle. Dual motor variants add a 158 kW (212 hp; 215 PS) YS210XYA03 Huawei induction motor to the front axle for a total output of 385 kW (516 hp; 523 PS), and are capable of accelerating from 0–100 km/h (62 mph) in 3.9 seconds.

Pure electric variants are equipped with a 100 kWh (97.6kWh) NMC Huawei Whale battery pack codeveloped with CATL, which provides CLTC range ratings of 816 km (507 mi) and 721 km (448 mi) for rear and all-wheel drive variants, respectively. The battery is capable of recharging 816 km (507 mi) of range within 5 minutes with a DC fast charger due to using an 800-volt electrical architecture.

The range-extender variant is equipped Huawei's Xuexiao system consisting of a BAIC 1.5-liter turbocharged inline-four gasoline engine codenamed A156T2H which is also found in the Beijing BJ60 Thunder and Beijing BJ40 EREV which outputs 158 hp (118 kW; 160 PS) and is not mechanically connected to the wheels. It is equipped with a choice of two CATL-supplied battery packs, a 37 kWh LFP pack providing 256 km (159 mi) of CLTC range, or a 53.4 kWh NMC pack with 365 km (227 mi) of electric range. It is only available in single-motor rear-wheel drive, and has a top speed of 204 km/h (127 mph). It uses a 400-volt electrical architecture.

Powertrains
Variant	Battery	Power				Torque			Range				0–100 km/h (62 mph)	Top Speed	Weight
Variant	Battery	Power				Torque			CLTC		WLTP		0–100 km/h (62 mph)	Top Speed	Weight
Variant	Battery	Engine	Front	Rear	Total	Front	Rear	Total	EV	Total	EV	Total	0–100 km/h (62 mph)	Top Speed	Weight
S9 EREV	37 kWh LFP CATL	1.5 L A156T2H I4 118 kW (158 hp; 160 PS)	—	TZ210XYAP4 227 kW (304 hp; 309 PS)	227 kW (304 hp; 309 PS)	—	320 N⋅m (236 lb⋅ft)	320 N⋅m (236 lb⋅ft)	256 km (159 mi)	1,256 km (780 mi)	204 km (127 mi)	1,085 km (674 mi)	7.2 s	204 km/h (127 mph)	2,330 kg (5,137 lb)
S9T EREV	37 kWh LFP CATL	1.5 L A156T2H I4 118 kW (158 hp; 160 PS)	—	TZ210XYAP4 227 kW (304 hp; 309 PS)	227 kW (304 hp; 309 PS)	—	320 N⋅m (236 lb⋅ft)	320 N⋅m (236 lb⋅ft)						204 km/h (127 mph)	2,354 kg (5,190 lb)
S9 EREV	53.4 kWh NMC CATL	1.5 L A156T2H I4 118 kW (158 hp; 160 PS)	—	TZ210XYAP4 227 kW (304 hp; 309 PS)	227 kW (304 hp; 309 PS)	—	320 N⋅m (236 lb⋅ft)	320 N⋅m (236 lb⋅ft)	365 km (227 mi)	1,355 km (842 mi)	290 km (180 mi)	1,170 km (727 mi)	7.3 s	202 km/h (126 mph)	2,350 kg (5,181 lb)
S9T EREV	53.4 kWh NMC CATL	1.5 L A156T2H I4 118 kW (158 hp; 160 PS)	—	TZ210XYAP4 227 kW (304 hp; 309 PS)	227 kW (304 hp; 309 PS)	—	320 N⋅m (236 lb⋅ft)	320 N⋅m (236 lb⋅ft)	354 km (220 mi)	1,305 km (811 mi)				202 km/h (126 mph)	2,388 kg (5,265 lb)
S9 EV	100 kWh NMC CATL	—	—	TZ210XYA03 227 kW (304 hp; 309 PS)	227 kW (304 hp; 309 PS)	—	396 N⋅m (292 lb⋅ft)	396 N⋅m (292 lb⋅ft)	816 km (507 mi)		—		6.0 s	214 km/h (133 mph)	2,246 kg (4,952 lb)
S9T EV	100 kWh NMC CATL	—	—	TZ210XYA03 227 kW (304 hp; 309 PS)	227 kW (304 hp; 309 PS)	—	396 N⋅m (292 lb⋅ft)	396 N⋅m (292 lb⋅ft)	801 km (498 mi)					210 km/h (130 mph)	2,302 kg (5,075 lb)
S9 EV AWD	100 kWh NMC CATL	—	158 kW (212 hp; 215 PS)	TZ210XYA03 227 kW (304 hp; 309 PS)	385 kW (516 hp; 523 PS)	277 N⋅m (204 lb⋅ft)	396 N⋅m (292 lb⋅ft)	673 N⋅m (496 lb⋅ft)	721 km (448 mi)		—		3.9 s	214 km/h (133 mph)	2,355 kg (5,192 lb)
S9T EV AWD	100 kWh NMC CATL	—	158 kW (212 hp; 215 PS)	TZ210XYA03 227 kW (304 hp; 309 PS)	385 kW (516 hp; 523 PS)	277 N⋅m (204 lb⋅ft)	396 N⋅m (292 lb⋅ft)	673 N⋅m (496 lb⋅ft)						210 km/h (130 mph)	2,355 kg (5,192 lb)

== Safety ==
C-NCAP (2024) test results 2024 Stelato S9 Max RWD (EV)
Category		%
Overall:	5 /5 stars	89.4%
Occupant protection:		93.34%
Vulnerable road users:		79.34%
Active safety:		91.46%

== Sales ==
In July 2024, Stelato had plans to produce the S9 with an annual production capacity of 120,000 units before deliveries began in December that year. The S9 received 2,500 firm orders within 24 hours of its launch on 6 August 2024.

The S9T received over 10,000 orders within one hour of pre-sales opening on August 18.

Year	China						
Year	S9 EV	S9 EREV	S9 Total	S9T EV	S9T EREV	S9T Total	Total
2024	2,073	—					2,073
2025	4,276	13,309	17,585	8,947	9,737	18,684	36,269
