= Exeed Sterra ET =

Mid-size luxury crossover SUV

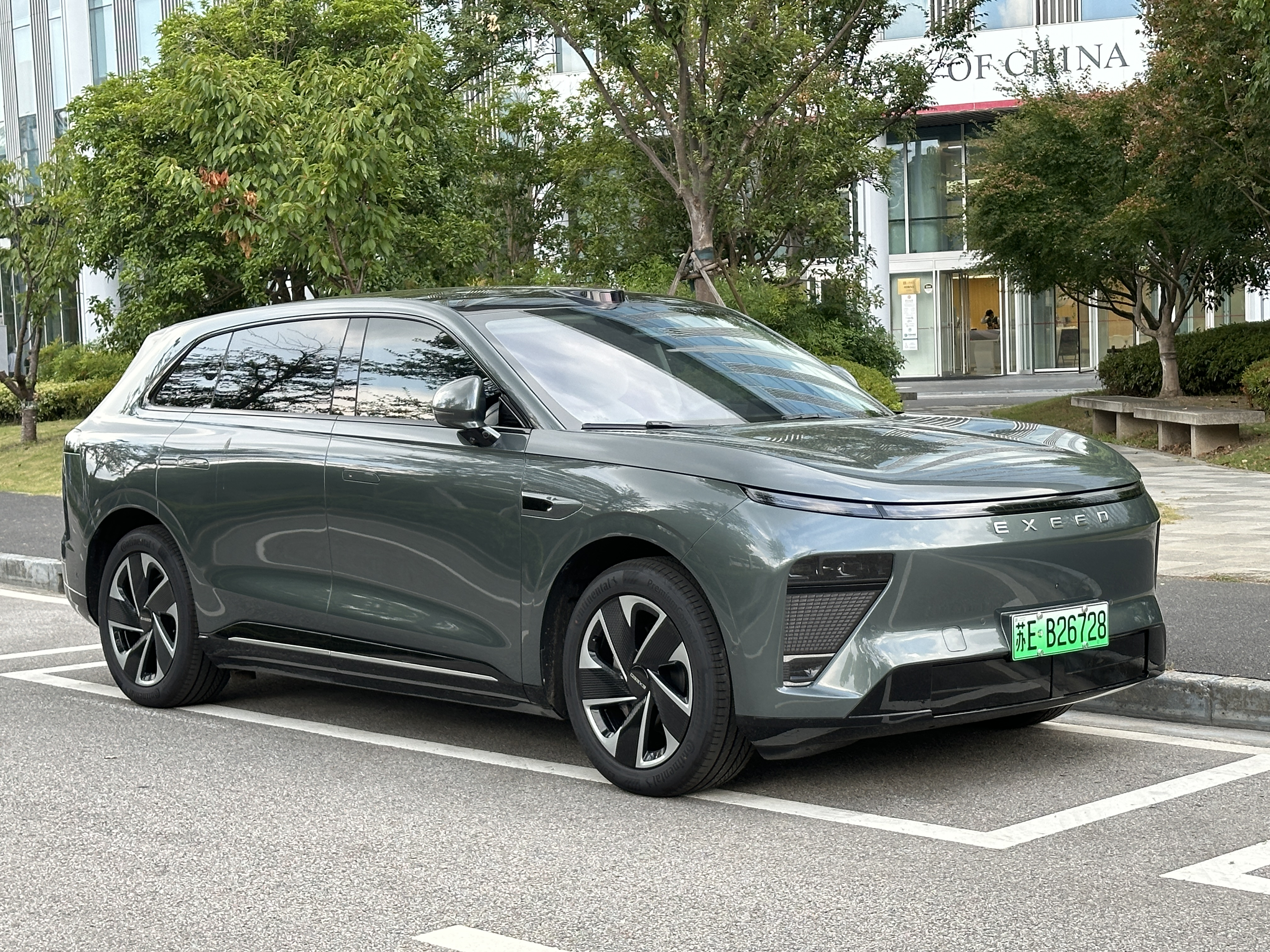

Overview
- Manufacturer: Exeed (Chery)
- Also called: Exlantix ET (export); Exeed EX7 (China, 2026–present)
- Production: January 2024 – present
- Assembly: China: Wuhu, Anhui
- Designer: Pier Luigi Ferrari

Body and chassis
- Class: Mid-size luxury crossover SUV (E)
- Body style: 5-door SUV
- Layout: Rear motor, rear-wheel drive; Dual-motor, all-wheel drive; Front-engine, Rear motor, rear-wheel drive; Front-engine, dual-motor, all-wheel drive
- Platform: E0X platform
- Related: Chery Fulwin T11; Exeed Sterra ES; Freelander 8; Luxeed R7; Luxeed S7; Luxeed V9

Powertrain
- Engine: Petrol range extender: 1.5 L SQRH4J15 turbo I4
- Electric motor: Permanent magnet synchronous; AC induction (front, EV Pro AWD)
- Transmission: Single-speed gear reduction
- Hybrid drivetrain: Range extender series hybrid
- Battery: 32 kWh LFP CATL; 34.37 kWh LFP Gotion; 41.16 kWh LFP Gotion; 43 kWh LFP Gotion; 77 kWh LFP CATL; 100.26 kWh NMC CATL
- Range: 1,300–1,518 km (808–943 mi) (EREV, CLTC); 1,130–1,373 km (702–853 mi) (EREV, WLTP)
- Electric range: 540–760 km (340–470 mi) (EV, CLTC); 200–245 km (124–152 mi) (EREV, CLTC); 161–203 km (100–126 mi) (EREV, WLTP)

Dimensions
- Wheelbase: 3,000 mm (118.1 in)
- Length: 4,955 mm (195.1 in); 4,955 mm (195.1 in) (EX7)
- Width: 1,975 mm (77.8 in)
- Height: 1,698 mm (66.9 in); 1,702–1,710 mm (67.0–67.3 in) (EX7)
- Curb weight: 2,140–2,380 kg (4,720–5,250 lb); 2,200–2,400 kg (4,900–5,300 lb) (EX7)

The Exeed Sterra ET (Chinese: 星纪元ET; pinyin: xīng jì yuán), known as the Exlantix ET outside the Chinese market, is a battery electric and range extended mid-size luxury crossover SUV manufactured by Chinese automobile manufacturer Exeed, a premium brand of Chery. The Sterra ET was first revealed at Auto Shanghai 2023 in April and sales began in China on 9 May 2024. It is the first vehicle to use CATL's Shenxing 2.0 battery packs.

== Overview ==
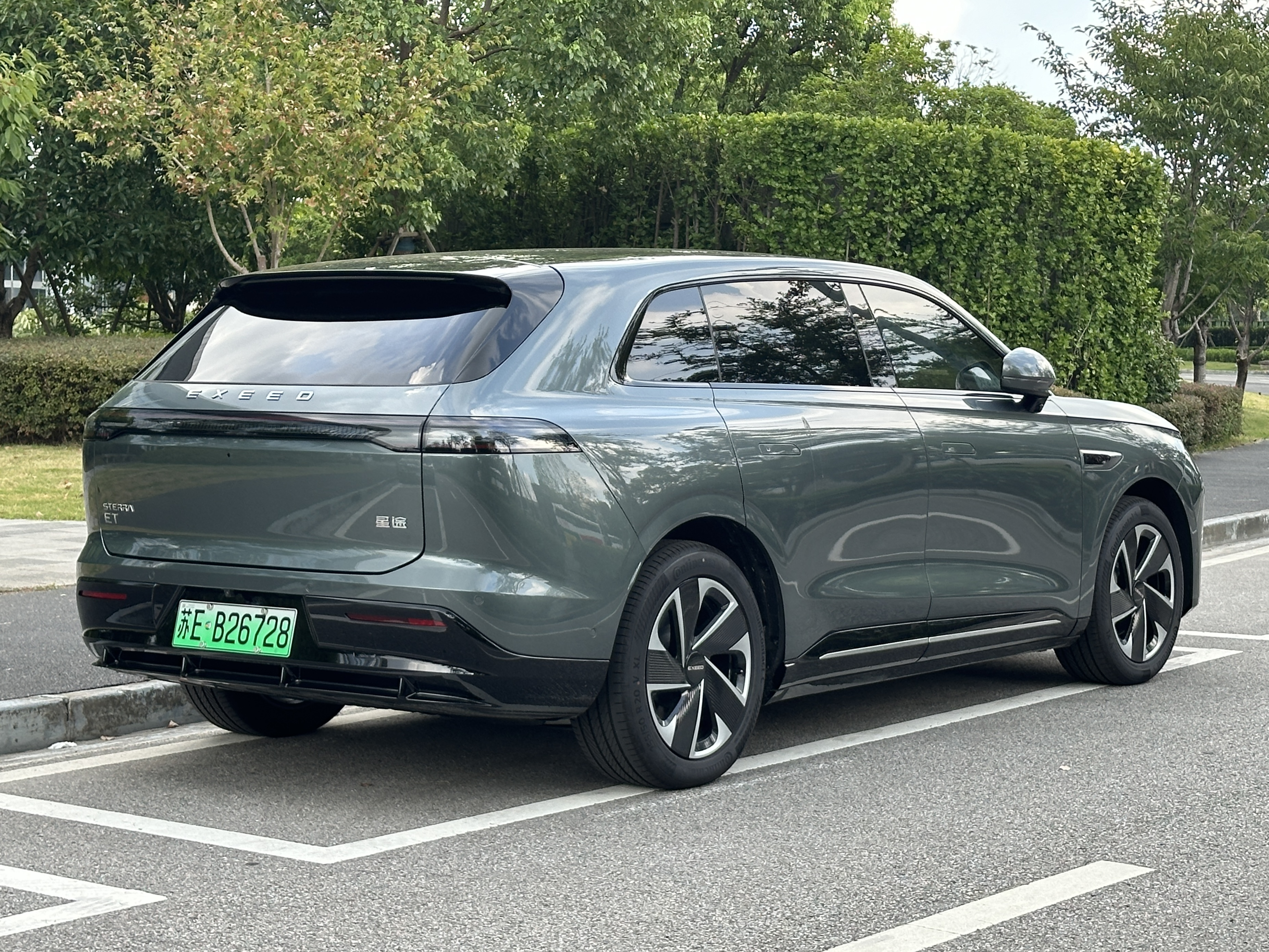
Rear view

Interior

The Sterra ET was first revealed on 7 April 2023 at the Chery Night event preceding 2023 Auto Shanghai when Sterra sub-brand was first unveiled, with the interior revealed later at the 2023 Chengdu Motor Show. Production started on 19 January, before presales opened on 15 April, and sales began in China on 9 May 2024.

The Sterra ET is Exeed's second product in its Sterra lineup after the Sterra ES sedan. The Sterra ET is developed on the same platform as the Sterra ES, which shares its 3,000 mm (118.1 in) wheelbase. The Sterra ET aims to compete directly against models such as the Tesla Model Y, Nio ES7 and XPeng G9. It is positioned as a flagship medium to large-sized luxury SUV. It is similar in price to the Tesla Model Y, but slightly larger in size.

On 15 November 2024 pre-orders of the all-wheel drive range-extender version opened at Auto Guangzhou 2024, and deliveries began on 15 December.

== Design ==
=== Exterior ===
The front of the Sterra ET has grille-less design with a lower air intake with active shutters, with light bar style DRLs and a split-headlight design. The trapezoid-shaped lighting modules on the corners consist of LED headlights at the top and fog lights at the bottom, between which is an optional array of 180 LEDs forming an LED display marketed as the 'light language system', which can be used to communicate with other road users such as pedestrians. Lower end models without the display instead have a decorative panel. It has an optional roof-mounted LiDAR, 20-inch wheels, and pop-out door handles on its frameless doors. The rear taillights also have a light bar design, and consist of 262 LEDs. The Sterra ET has a drag coefficient of 0.26 C_{d}.

The Sterra ET uses double wishbone independent suspension for the front wheels, and multi-link independent suspension for the rear wheels. It has an air suspension system supplied by KHAT with continuous damping control, and the system uses the vehicle's LiDAR to adapt to future road conditions. The air suspension allows for up to 100 mm (3.9 in) of ride height adjustment in seven increments, and above 120 km/h (75 mph) it lowers to the minimum height to reduce drag to increase efficiency and improve stability. Exeed claims that the calibrated combination of the air suspension and continuous damping control reduced pitch and roll motions by 30% and 20%, respectively.

=== Interior ===
The interior of the Sterra ET is equipped with a 10.25-inch floating LCD instrument panel, 23-inch head-up display, a 15.6-inch 2.5K central control screen, and a two-spoke D-shaped steering wheel. The infotainment system was initially run on a Qualcomm Snapdragon 8155 SoC before later being upgraded to a Snapdragon 8295P, and uses the Lion AI model in its voice assistant. The center console is separate from the dashboard allowing for an open footwell area, containing dual cupholders and twin wireless charging pads. It has a three-zone climate control system that utilizes a heat pump for heating, electronically activated glovebox compartment, a 2.38-square-metre (25.6 sq ft) fixed panoramic sunroof which later comes with a power sunshade, double-glazed windows, an automatic fragrance system, and an available 23-speaker 7.1.4 panoramic sound system.

The front and rear outboard seats have heating, ventilation, and massage functions. Additionally, the driver's seat has position memory, the passenger seat has a 'zero-gravity' recline mode, the front seats have power lumbar support adjustment and leg rest along with speakers integrated into the headrest, and the rear seats have power backrest angle adjustment. The trunk has a capacity of 546 litres (19.3 cu ft), which expands to 1,835 litres (64.8 cu ft) with the rear seats folded down; fully electric models are also equipped with a 60-litre (2.1 cu ft) frunk.

== Advanced driving systems ==
For its advanced driver assistance system, called the Falcon Smart Driving system, the Sterra ET uses an array of 30 sensors, including a Bosch-supplied LiDAR, in combination with two Nvidia Drive Orin chips capable of a total of 508 TOPS of computing power. At launch, the system was capable of Level 2 supervised autonomous driving on highways only. After an over-the-air update released in Q2, the system was able to be operate in urban conditions in a limited number of cities with high-resolution map coverage. In Q4, another over-the-air update enabled the system to be used on any road without relying on high-resolution map data. The Sterra ET is also capable automatic parking and autonomous valet parking.

The Sterra ET have V2L capabilities, with pure-electric models capable of outputting 6 kW while range-extended models reach 3.3 kW.

== Exeed EX7 ==
The Exeed EX7 is a variant of the Exeed Sterra ET or Exlantix ET featuring a restyled front end patented in China in November 2025 The EX7 was initially introduced as MIIT released photos of the ET7. Just like the Sterra ET, it is available as both a battery electric vehicle (BEV) and an extended-range electric vehicle (EREV). The EREV version is expected to feature a 1.5 liter turbo engine and an electric motor, while the BEV version will have a pure electric powertrain. The vehicle has a length of about 5 meters and a wheelbase of 3 meters. The upcoming variant with Electronic Mechanical Braking (EMB) system was the Exeed EX7, which was first images of a car appeared in February 7, 2026 with new exterior colors and a new rim design. Sales were commenced in China on 19 April 2026.

Exeed EX7

Rear view

Interior

== Exlantix ET ==
Outside of the Chinese market, the vehicle is marketed as the Exlantix ET with some minor changes. It is offered exclusively with range extender powertrain options. Notable styling alterations include a waterfall-style grille featuring vertically oriented chrome strips, a simplified vertical headlight array that replaces the LED display panels found on the Chinese version, and a wider lower air intake with horizontal slats. The roof-mounted LiDAR unit has also been removed. To enhance winter weather durability for markets such as Russia, the Exlantix ET has stronger anti-corrosion coatings on the chassis, and all exterior body panels are made of aluminum to prevent rust and reduce weight.

Exlantix ET

Rear view

== Markets ==
On 8 January 2025, the first Exlantix ET intended for export markets rolled off the production line. Exeed plans to introduce it to 20 countries by the end of 2025.

=== Russia ===
The Exlantix ET for the Russian market was unveiled on 24 September 2024 and is expected to go on sale in the first quarter of 2025 after being delayed from Q4 2024 to complete additional cold weather testing. The Russian market Exlantix ET is capable of receiving OTA updates, and has a localized infotainment system using local software such as Yandex Navigator.

== Powertrain ==
All versions of the Sterra ET use an electric drivetrain, with both purely electric and range-extended versions available in China, while export markets mostly receive the range extender versions. In Norway, only pure electric versions are sold.

=== Battery electric ===
The pure electric variants use an 800-volt electrical architecture and use CATL-supplied battery packs, with all models equipped with a rear motor outputting 230 kW (308 hp; 313 PS) and 425 N⋅m (313 lb⋅ft) of torque.

The standard models have a CATL-supplied 77 kWh LFP Shenxing 2.0 battery, and is the first vehicle to implement the Shenxing 2.0 battery technology. It is capable of charging from 30-80% in 9 minutes with a 4C charge rate, or 20–80% in 24 minutes when in −20 °C (−4 °F) conditions. The all-wheel drive version uses an additional front motor outputting 123 kW (165 hp; 167 PS) and 238 N⋅m (176 lb⋅ft) of torque. Rear-wheel drive models achieve CLTC range ratings of 625 km (388 mi), or 540 km (336 mi) with all-wheel drive. Rear-wheel drive models have a 0–100 km/h (62 mph) acceleration time of 6.4 seconds, and all-wheel drive reduces it to 4.7 seconds; both have a top speed of 200 km/h (124 mph).

The larger battery pack is a CATL-supplied 100 kWh NMC Qilin pack, which has a slower 30–80% charging time of 15 minutes. The all-wheel drive Ultra model uses an additional front motor outputting 183 kW (245 hp; 249 PS) and 266 N⋅m (196 lb⋅ft) of torque. Rear-wheel drive models achieve CLTC range ratings of 760 km (472 mi), or 655 km (407 mi) for the Ultra model. Rear-wheel drive models have a 0–100 km/h (62 mph) acceleration time of 6.6 seconds, while the Ultra reduces it to 3.8 seconds; both have a top speed of 210 km/h (130 mph).

=== Range extender ===
The range extended variant is offered with two powertrain configurations, both using a 400-volt electrical architecture. They both use a 1.5-litre turbocharged direct-injected all-aluminium inline-four petrol engine using the Miller cycle and with a compression ratio of 14.5:1, achieving a claimed 44.5% peak thermal efficiency. It outputs 105 kW (141 hp; 143 PS) at 5,200 rpm and 220 N⋅m (162 lb⋅ft) of torque at 2,500–4,000 rpm, and does not mechanically drive the wheels.

Rear-wheel drive configurations are powered by an electric motor outputting 195 kW (261 hp; 265 PS) and 324 N⋅m (239 lb⋅ft) of torque, with power supplied by a 32 kWh LFP battery pack from CATL. It has a 0–100 km/h (62 mph) acceleration time of 7.8 seconds and a top speed of 180 km/h (112 mph). WLTP range ratings are an all-electric 161 km (100 mi) and 1,373 km (853 mi) combined, while the CLTC all-electric range rating is 200 km (124 mi) and 1,518 km (943 mi) combined.

The all-wheel drive configuration uses a dual electric motor setup marketed as Snow Leopard 4WD, paired with a larger 41.2 kWh battery supplied by Gotion High-Tech. It uses a front motor outputting 150 kW (201 hp; 204 PS) and 310 N⋅m (229 lb⋅ft) of torque, paired with the same rear motor. The vehicle has a 0–100 km/h (62 mph) acceleration time of 4.8 seconds and a top speed of 195 km/h (121 mph). The Snow Leopard 4WD system of the Sterra ET extended-range electric vehicle has electronic slip control with a response time under 0.05 seconds. The four-wheel drive version has WLTP range ratings of 200 km (124 mi) off the battery and 1,300 km (808 mi) combined, while the all-electric CLTC range rating is 240 km (149 mi), with a combined range of 1,500 km (932 mi).

Specifications
Model	Battery	Range		Motor		0–100 km/h (62 mph)	Top speed	Charging	
Model	Battery	CLTC	WLTP	Power	Torque	0–100 km/h (62 mph)	Top speed	Peak	30-80% time
EV
ET Pro	77 kWh LFP; 800V; CATL Shenxing	625 km (388 mi)	—	230 kW (308 hp; 313 PS)	425 N⋅m (313 lb⋅ft)	6.4 s	200 km/h (124 mph)	400 kW	9 min
2025 ET Pro	77 kWh LFP; 800V; CATL Shenxing	625 km (388 mi)	—	230 kW (308 hp; 313 PS)	425 N⋅m (313 lb⋅ft)	6.6 s	200 km/h (124 mph)	420 kW	9 min
EX7	77 kWh LFP; 800V; CATL Shenxing	600 km (373 mi)	—	230 kW (308 hp; 313 PS)	425 N⋅m (313 lb⋅ft)	6.6 s	200 km/h (124 mph)	420 kW	9 min
Pro AWD	77 kWh LFP; 800V; CATL Shenxing	540 km (336 mi)	—	Front: 123 kW (165 hp; 167 PS); Rear: 230 kW (308 hp; 313 PS); Total: 353 kW (473 hp; 480 PS)	Front: 238 N⋅m (176 lb⋅ft); Rear: 425 N⋅m (313 lb⋅ft); Total: 663 N⋅m (489 lb⋅ft)	4.7 s	200 km/h (124 mph)	400 kW	9 min
Max	100.26 kWh NMC; 800V; CATL Qilin	760 km (472 mi)	—	230 kW (308 hp; 313 PS)	425 N⋅m (313 lb⋅ft)	6.6 s	200 km/h (124 mph)	297 kW	15 min
EX7	100.26 kWh NMC; 800V; CATL Qilin	726 km (451 mi)	—	230 kW (308 hp; 313 PS)	425 N⋅m (313 lb⋅ft)	6.4 s	200 km/h (124 mph)	297 kW	15 min
Ultra	100.26 kWh NMC; 800V; CATL Qilin	655 km (407 mi)	—	Front: 183 kW (245 hp; 249 PS); Rear: 230 kW (308 hp; 313 PS); Total: 413 kW (554 hp; 562 PS)	Front: 266 N⋅m (196 lb⋅ft); Rear: 425 N⋅m (313 lb⋅ft); Total: 691 N⋅m (510 lb⋅ft)	3.8 s	210 km/h (130 mph)	297 kW	15 min
EX7	100.26 kWh NMC; 800V; CATL Qilin	682 km (424 mi)		Front: 123 kW (165 hp; 167 PS); Rear: 230 kW (308 hp; 313 PS); Total: 353 kW (473 hp; 480 PS)	Front: 238 N⋅m (176 lb⋅ft); Rear: 425 N⋅m (313 lb⋅ft); Total: 663 N⋅m (489 lb⋅ft)	4.7 s	210 km/h (130 mph)	297 kW	15 min
EREV
ET5	32 kWh LFP; 400V; CATL	Electric: 200 km (124 mi) Total: 1,518 km (943 mi)	Electric: 161 km (100 mi) Total: 1,373 km (853 mi)	195 kW (261 hp; 265 PS)	324 N⋅m (239 lb⋅ft)	7.8 s	180 km/h (112 mph)	50 kW	28 min
2025 ET5	34.37 kWh LFP; 400V; Gotion	Electric: 230 km (143 mi) Total: 1,580 km (980 mi)	Electric: 180 km (112 mi) Total: 1,380 km (857 mi)	195 kW (261 hp; 265 PS)	324 N⋅m (239 lb⋅ft)	8.0 s	200 km/h (124 mph)	90 kW	14.5 min
2025 ET5	41.16 kWh LFP; 400V; Gotion	Electric: 265 km (165 mi) Total: 1,615 km (1,004 mi)	Electric: 215 km (134 mi) Total: 1,415 km (879 mi)	195 kW (261 hp; 265 PS)	324 N⋅m (239 lb⋅ft)	7.6 s	200 km/h (124 mph)	110 kW	14.5 min
EX7	41.16 kWh LFP; 400V; Gotion	Electric: 245 km (152 mi) Total: 1,520 km (944 mi)	Electric: 203 km (126 mi) Total: 1,306 km (812 mi)	227 kW (304 hp; 309 PS)	332 N⋅m (245 lb⋅ft)	7.6 s	200 km/h (124 mph)	110 kW	14.5 min
ET5 AWD	41.16 kWh LFP; 400V; Gotion	Electric: 240 km (149 mi) Total: 1,500 km (932 mi)	Electric: 200 km (124 mi) Total: 1,300 km (808 mi)	Front: 150 kW (201 hp; 204 PS); Rear: 195 kW (261 hp; 265 PS); Total: 345 kW (463 hp; 469 PS)	Front: 310 N⋅m (229 lb⋅ft); Rear: 324 N⋅m (239 lb⋅ft); Total: 634 N⋅m (468 lb⋅ft)	4.8 s	195 km/h (121 mph)	107 kW	14.5 min
EX7 AWD	41.16 kWh LFP; 400V; Gotion	Electric: 225 km (140 mi) Total: 1,300 km (808 mi)	Electric: 182 km (113 mi) Total: 1,130 km (702 mi)	Front: 150 kW (201 hp; 204 PS); Rear: 227 kW (304 hp; 309 PS); Total: 377 kW (506 hp; 513 PS)	Front: 310 N⋅m (229 lb⋅ft); Rear: 332 N⋅m (245 lb⋅ft); Total: 642 N⋅m (474 lb⋅ft)	4.9 s	195 km/h (121 mph)	107 kW	14.5 min

== Awards ==
On 27 January 2025 the EREV AWD version of the Sterra ET won Car of the Year 2024 in CCTV's China Auto Awards. Judges for the awards included members of CATARC, China Association of Automobile Manufacturers and Dealers (CAAM), and Society of Automotive Engineers. It was praised for its range extender engine, four-wheel drive system, and self-driving ADAS system.

== Safety ==
=== C-NCAP ===
C-NCAP (2024) test results 2024 Exeed Sterra ET 625 Pro (EV)
Category		%
Overall:	5 /5 stars	86.4%
Occupant protection:		91.28%
Vulnerable road users:		76.20%
Active safety:		85.99%

=== Euro NCAP ===
Euro NCAP test results Exlantix ET, 4x2 (LHD) (2025)
Test	Points	%
Overall:	5 /5 stars	
Adult occupant:	36.2	90%
Child occupant:	42.0	85%
Pedestrian:	48.1	76%
Safety assist:	14.3	79%

== Sales ==
The Sterra ET received 18,397 pre-order sales in the 24 days between orders opening on 15 April 2024 and the vehicle launch presentation on 9 May.

Year	China		
Year	EV	EREV	Total
2024	4,168	15,297	19,465
2025	1,534	10,730	12,264
