= Chery Fulwin T11 =

Range extender full-size SUV

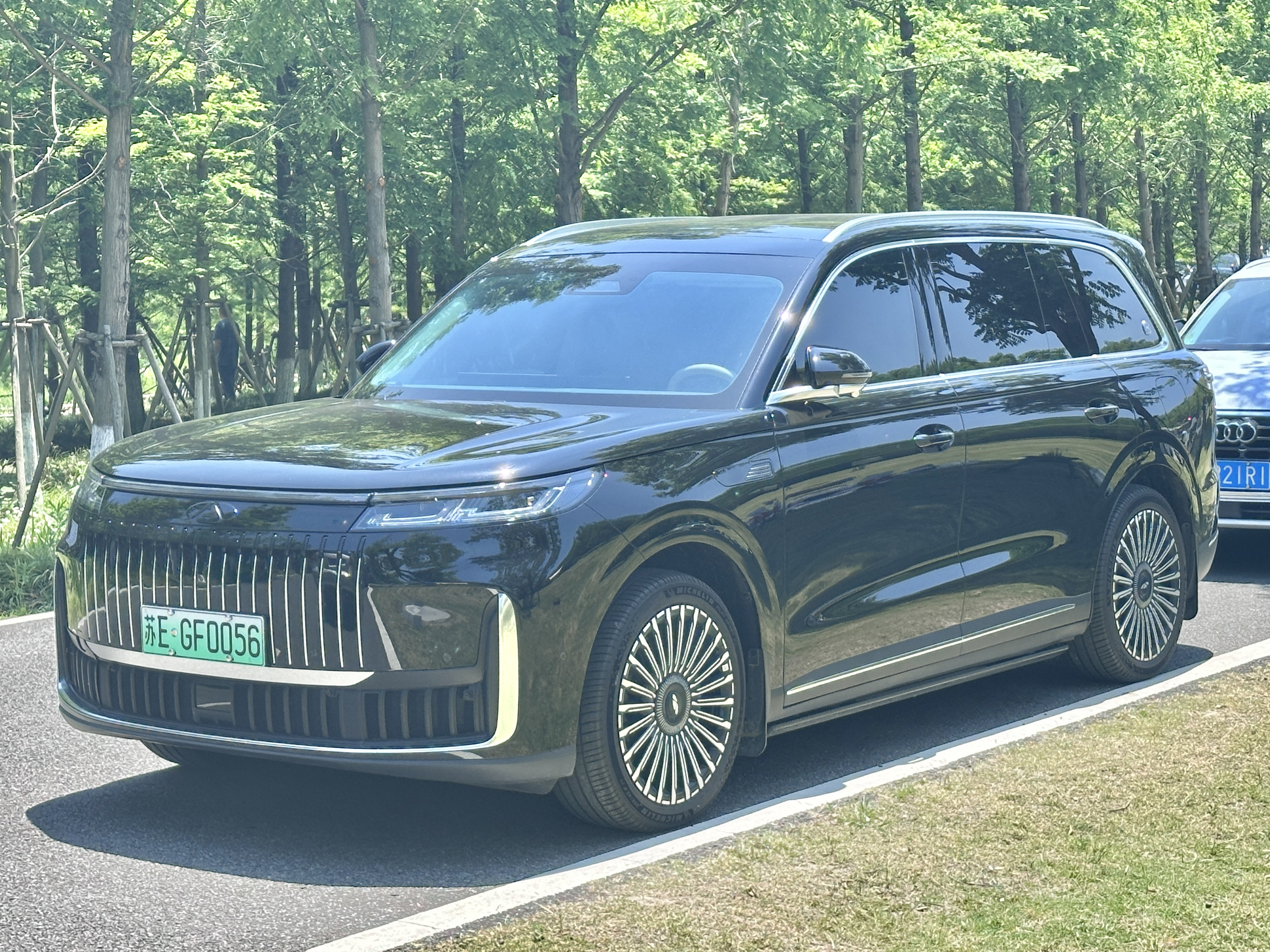

Overview
- Manufacturer: Chery
- Model code: E02
- Also called: Exeed ET8 (Russia); Jaecoo 9 (United Kingdom); Exlantix ET9 (export)
- Production: 2025–present
- Assembly: China: Wuhu, Anhui

Body and chassis
- Class: Full-size SUV
- Body style: 5-door SUV
- Layout: Front-engine, rear-motor, rear-wheel-drive; Front-engine, dual-motor, all-wheel-drive
- Platform: E0X
- Related: Exeed Sterra ES; Exeed Sterra ET; Freelander 8; Luxeed S7; Luxeed R7; Luxeed V9

Powertrain
- Engine: Petrol range extender: 1.5 L SQRH4J15 turbo I4
- Power output: 261–463 hp (195–345 kW; 265–469 PS)
- Hybrid drivetrain: Series hybrid
- Battery: 33.68 kWh LFP Gotion; 39.92 kWh LFP Gotion
- Range: 1,400 km (870 mi)
- Electric range: 170–180 km (106–112 mi) (WLTC); 220 km (137 mi) (CLTC)

Dimensions
- Wheelbase: 3,120 mm (122.8 in)
- Length: 5,205 mm (204.9 in)
- Width: 1,998 mm (78.7 in)
- Height: 1,800 mm (70.9 in)
- Curb weight: 2,452–2,635 kg (5,406–5,809 lb)

The Chery Fulwin T11 (Chinese: 奇瑞风云T11; pinyin: Qíruì Fēngyún T11) is a range extender full-size SUV manufactured by Chery under the Fulwin brand. Sales started in the second half of 2025.

== Overview ==
=== Concept model ===
The Fulwin T11 was first showed off as a concept at the 2023 Guangzhou Auto Show on 24 September 2023. It was presented as the first model of the Fulwin sub-brand. The B, C, and D-pillars were all blacked out, with the blacked out D-pillar not making it into the production version. Short horizontal LED strips on each side were also on the concept's front grille and also didn't make it into the production version.

=== Production model ===
The Fulwin T11 is a full-size range extended SUV and is the 2nd vehicle under the Fulwin brand. It uses a front-engine, dual-motor, all-wheel-drive layout. The production model was first presented at the 2024 Chengdu Auto Show. The T11's pre-sale deposits opened on August 12, 2025. Pre-sales officially began on October 13, 2025.

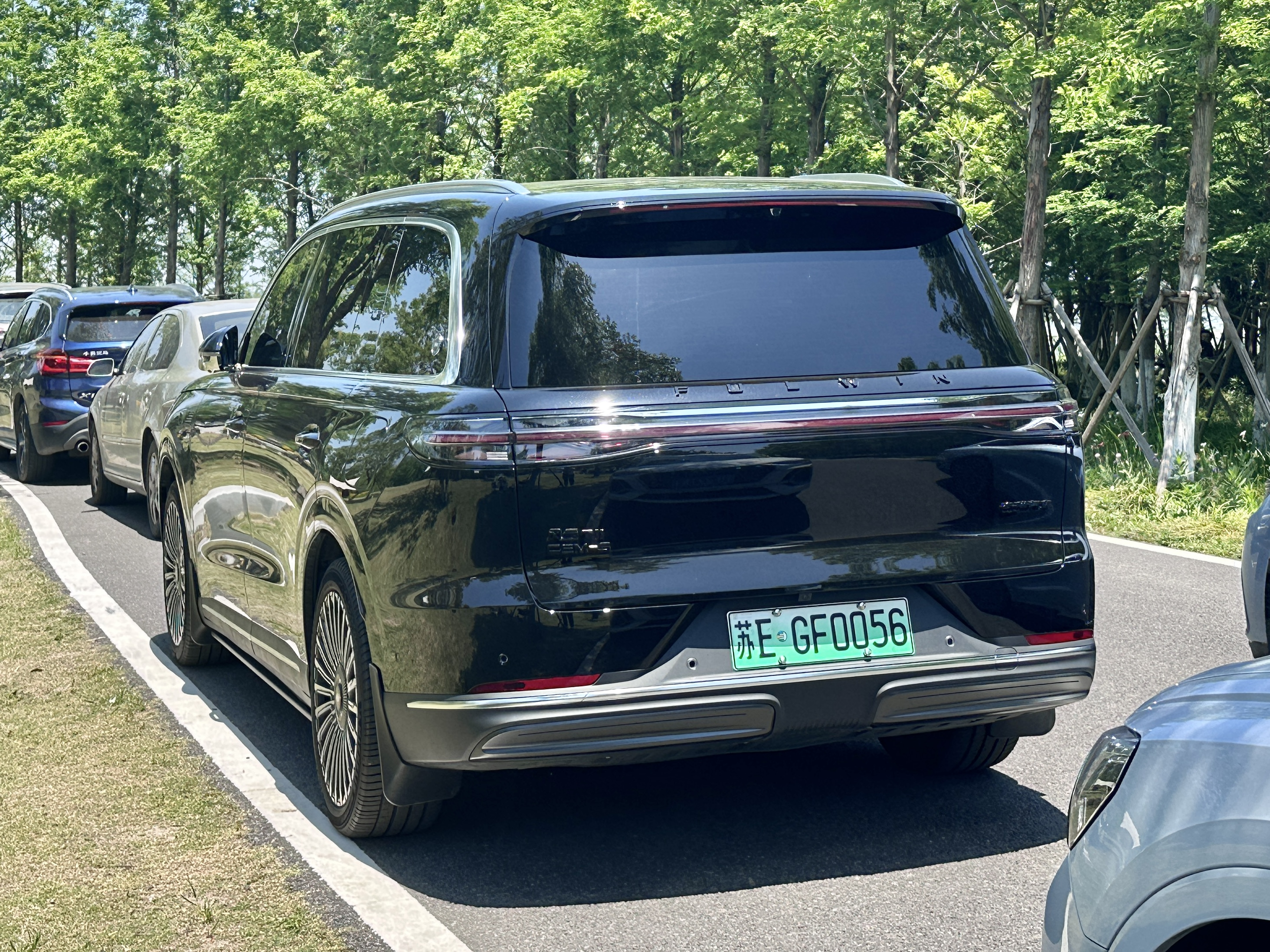
Rear view

== Design and features ==
The grille adopts a main waterfall design with vertical chrome trims combined with a trapezoidal grille in the bottom and slender headlights. The rear has a through-type taillight and chrome decoration in the bottom, which it retained from the concept car.

The Fulwin T11 uses a 6-seat setup (2+2+2), a 30-inch touchscreen, and a 17.3-inch ceiling-mounted display for the second row. A 10.25-inch heads-up display is also utilized.

The front suspension uses a double wishbone setup and the rear suspension is a multi-link setup. AWD models add CDC adaptive dampers for real-time damping adjustment. The Fulwin T11 comes standard with Chery’s Falcon 500 system and offers the more advanced Falcon 700 package in higher variants. The setup uses 27 perception units, including a LiDAR sensor, 11 exterior cameras, three millimetre-wave radars, and 12 ultrasonic radars, powered by an NVIDIA Orin-Y chip.

== Powertrain ==
The Fulwin T11 uses the Kunpeng Super Performance Electric Hybrid C-DM system pairing a 1.5-liter turbocharged inline-4 engine codenamed SQRH4J15 with 2 electric motors. The engine makes 154 horsepower (115 kW; 156 PS) and 220 newton-metres (162 lb⋅ft) of torque.

Rear-wheel-drive models make 261 horsepower (195 kW; 265 PS) and use a 33.68 kWh lithium iron phosphate battery. All-wheel-drive models make 463 horsepower (345 kW; 469 PS) and use a 39.92 kWh battery also made from lithium iron phosphate. Both models have an all-electric range of 220 kilometres (137 mi). The total range is claimed to be 1,400 kilometres (870 mi).

== Sales ==
Year	China
2025	9,055
