= Luxeed V9 =

Range-extended full-size luxury minivan

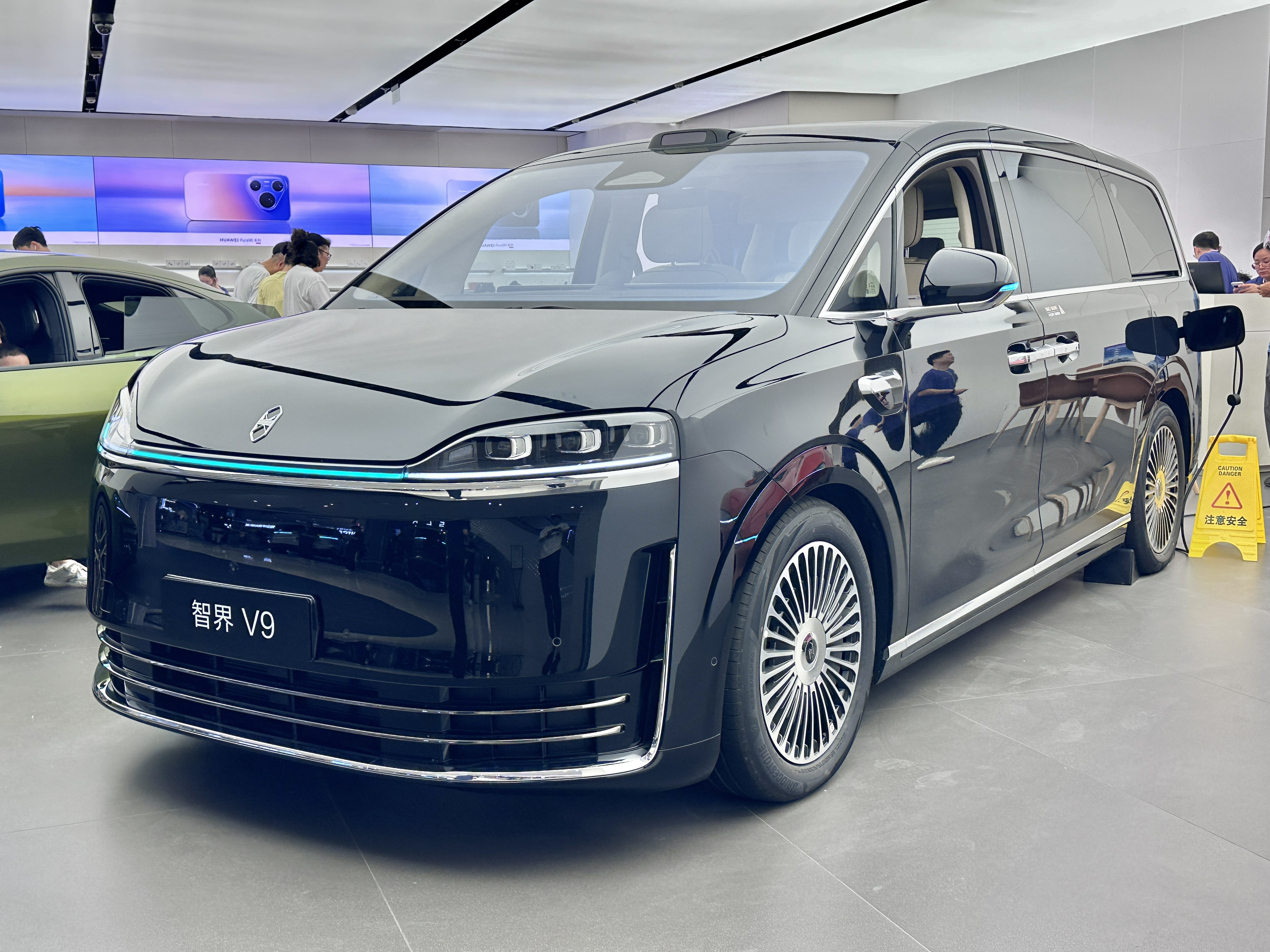

Overview
- Manufacturer: Luxeed (Chery)
- Model code: EHV
- Also called: Luxeed Llounge (export)
- Production: 2026–present
- Assembly: China: Wuhu

Body and chassis
- Class: Full-size luxury minivan (M)
- Body style: 5-door minivan
- Layout: Front-engine, rear-motor, rear-wheel-drive; Front-engine, dual-motor, all-wheel-drive
- Platform: E0X-L platform
- Related: Chery Fulwin T11; Exeed Sterra ES; Exeed Sterra ET; Freelander 8; Luxeed R7; Luxeed S7

Powertrain
- Engine: Gasoline range extender: 1.5 L SQRH4J15 turbo I4
- Electric motor: Huawei's DriveONE powertrain
- Power output: 154 hp (115 kW; 156 PS) (engine; EREV); 304 hp (227 kW; 308 PS) (EREV RWD); 513 hp (383 kW; 520 PS) (EREV AWD)
- Hybrid drivetrain: Series (EREV)
- Battery: 37 kWh CATL LFP; 53.3 kWh CATL NMC
- Range: Up to 777 mi (1,250 km) (CLTC / NEDC)
- Electric range: 158–223 km (98–139 mi) (EREV; CLTC); 245–265 km (152–165 mi) (EREV; NEDC)
- Plug-in charging: 186.5 mi (300 km) in 10 minutes

Dimensions
- Wheelbase: 3,250 mm (128.0 in)
- Length: 5,359 mm (211.0 in)
- Width: 2,009 mm (79.1 in)
- Height: 1,859 mm (73.2 in)
- Curb weight: 2,750–2,940 kg (6,063–6,482 lb)

The Luxeed V9 (Chinese: 智界V9; pinyin: Zhìjiè V9) is a range-extended full-size luxury minivan produced by Chery and sold under Luxeed, a brand of Chery created in collaboration with HIMA, Huawei's multi-brand automotive alliance and sales network. It is the first minivan to be sold by any HIMA brand.

== Overview ==
The V9 started its life as a minivan meant for Exeed, one of Chery's other marques. The original model meant for Exeed was even revealed in concept car form at the 2024 Beijing Auto Show as the Exeed E08. However it was revealed in August 2025 that the project was later cancelled and the development team was reassigned to Luxeed. The development code was revealed to be EHV in the same month. Had the E08 project team not transferred to Luxeed, the E08 would have begun mass production, sales, and deliveries earlier into 2025, and the V9 wouldn't have gone into fruition.

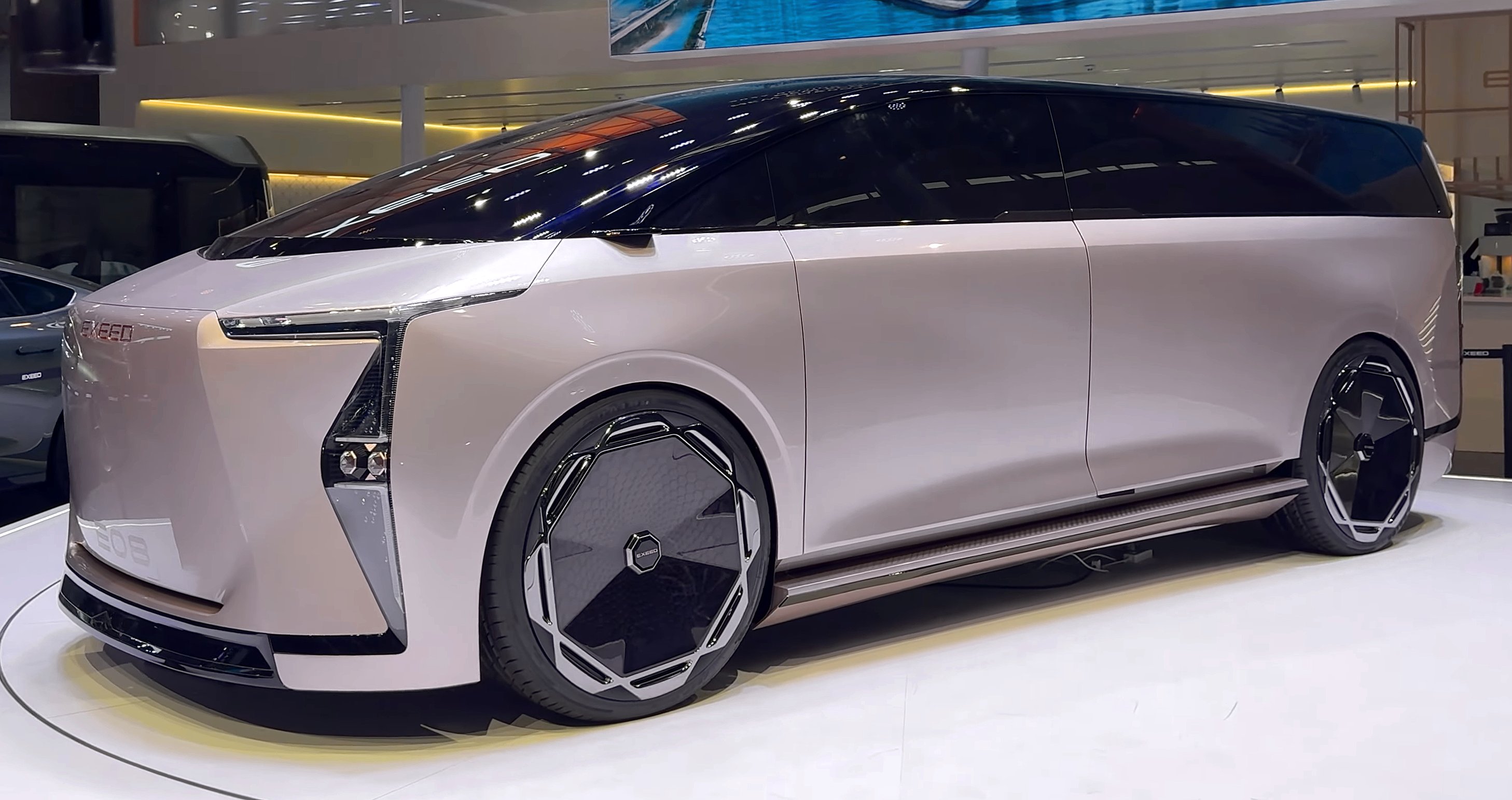
Exeed E08

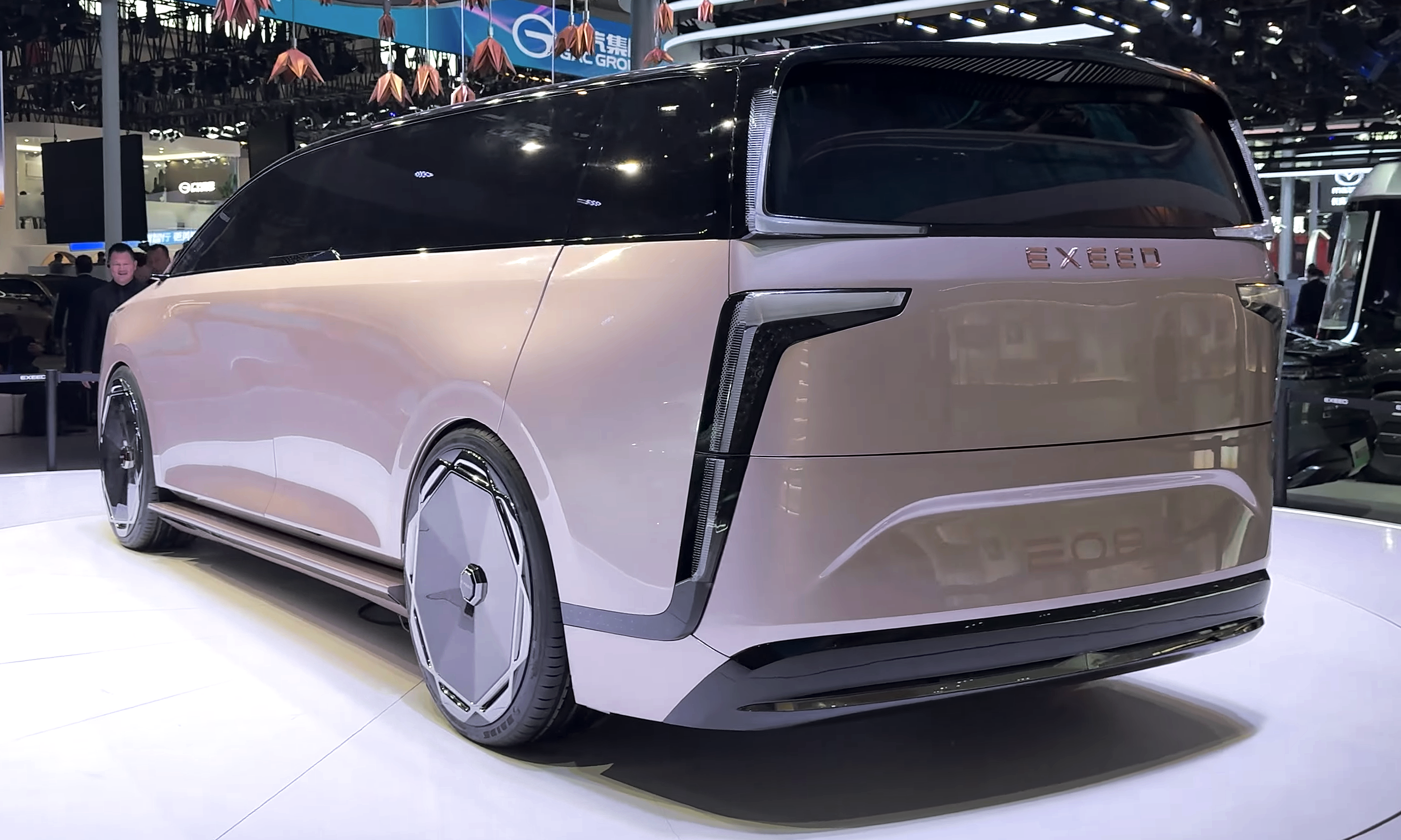
Rear view

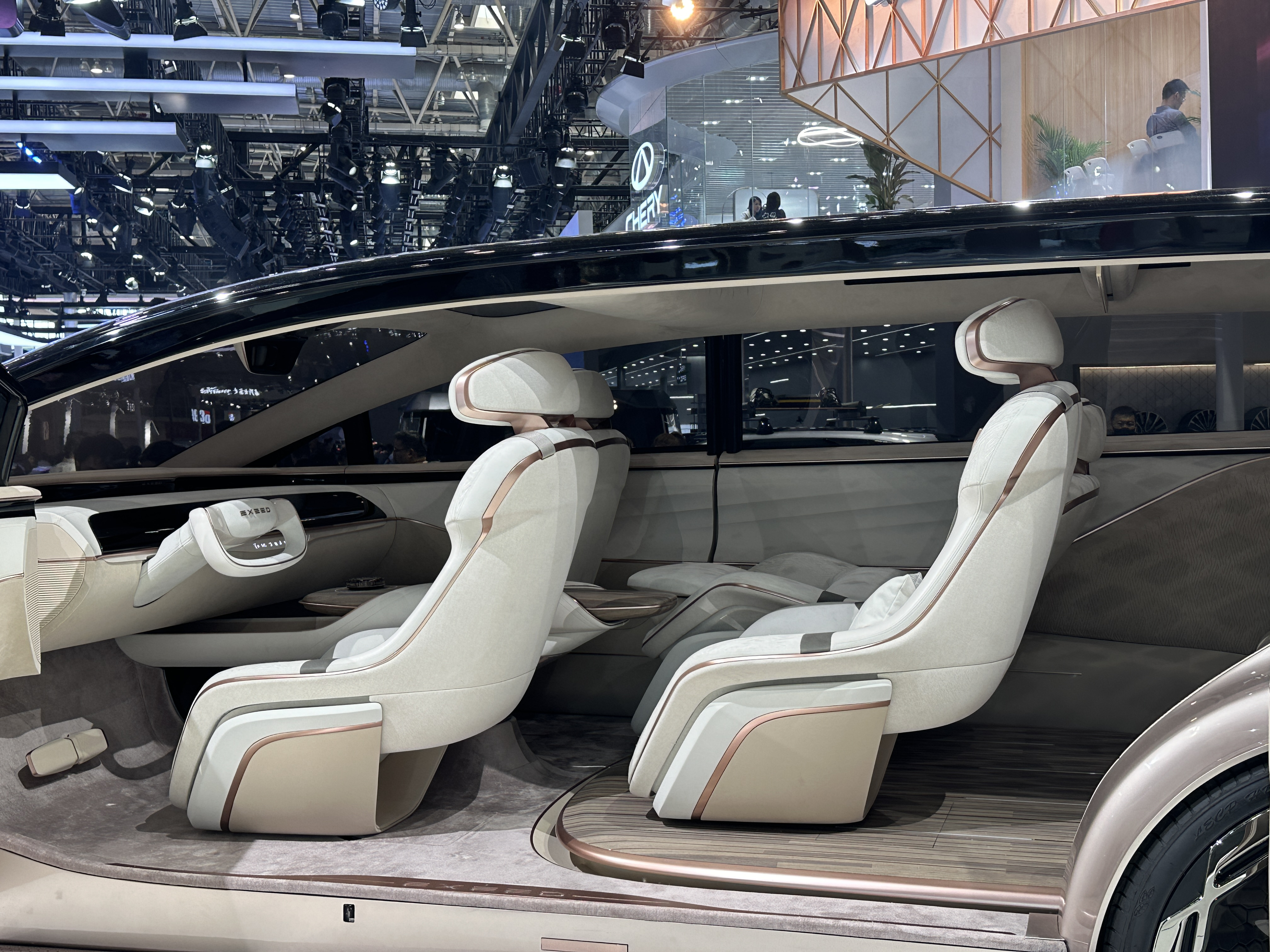
Interior

The MPV's name was revealed as the Luxeed V9 on December 9, 2025. Luxeed's V9 will become the first minivan sold by any HIMA brand. It rides on Chery's E0X-L platform, a modified version of the already existing E0X platform. On April 22, 2026, pre-sales for the V9 began at the HIMA Spring New Product Launch Conference, with prices starting from 399,800 yuan and 529,800 yuan. It also made its debut at the Beijing Auto Show on April 26, 2026.

According to Luxeed, the V in the name means "victory" and the number 9 in the name denotes its status as a flagship model in the HIMA lineup.

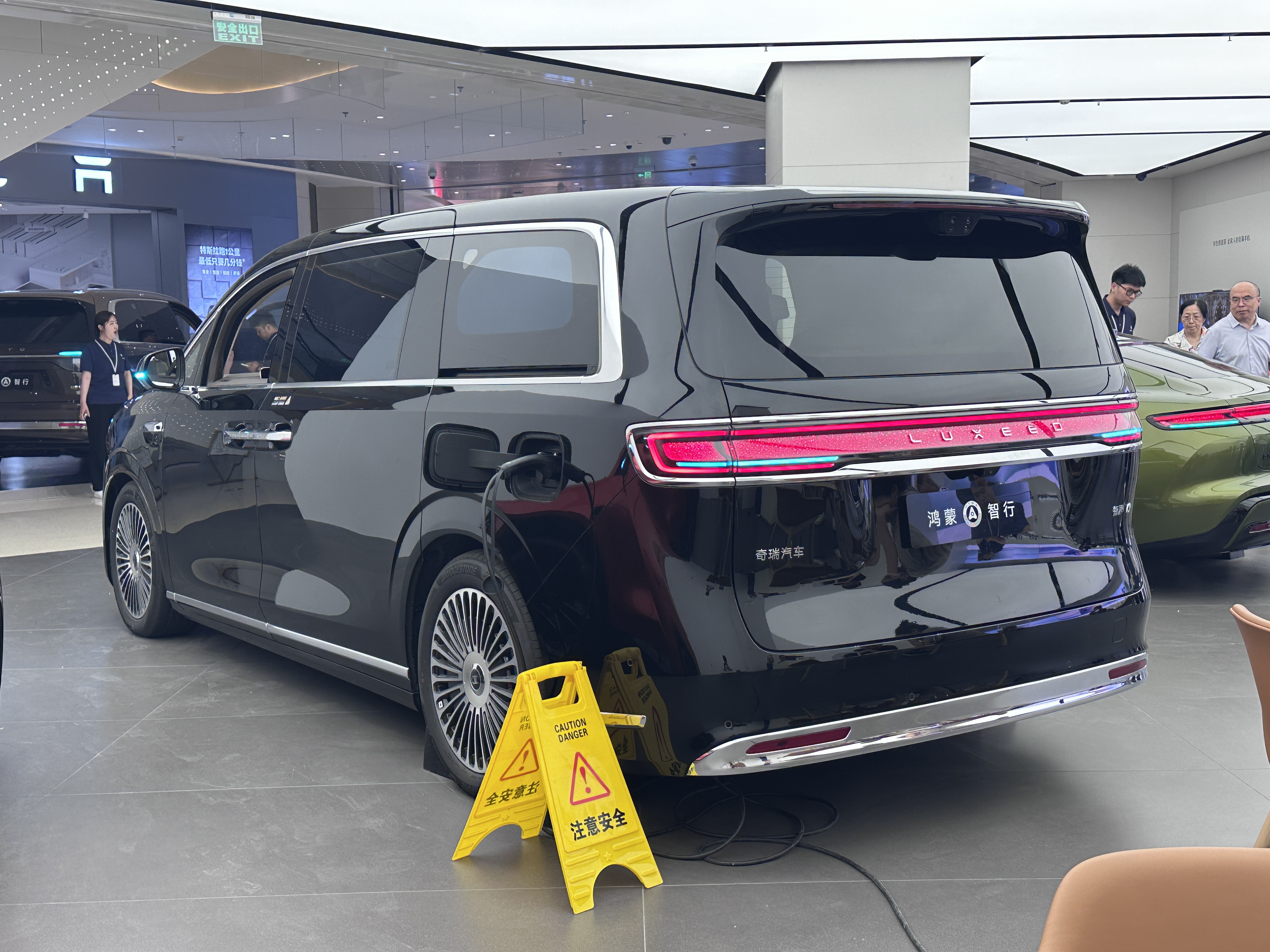
Rear view

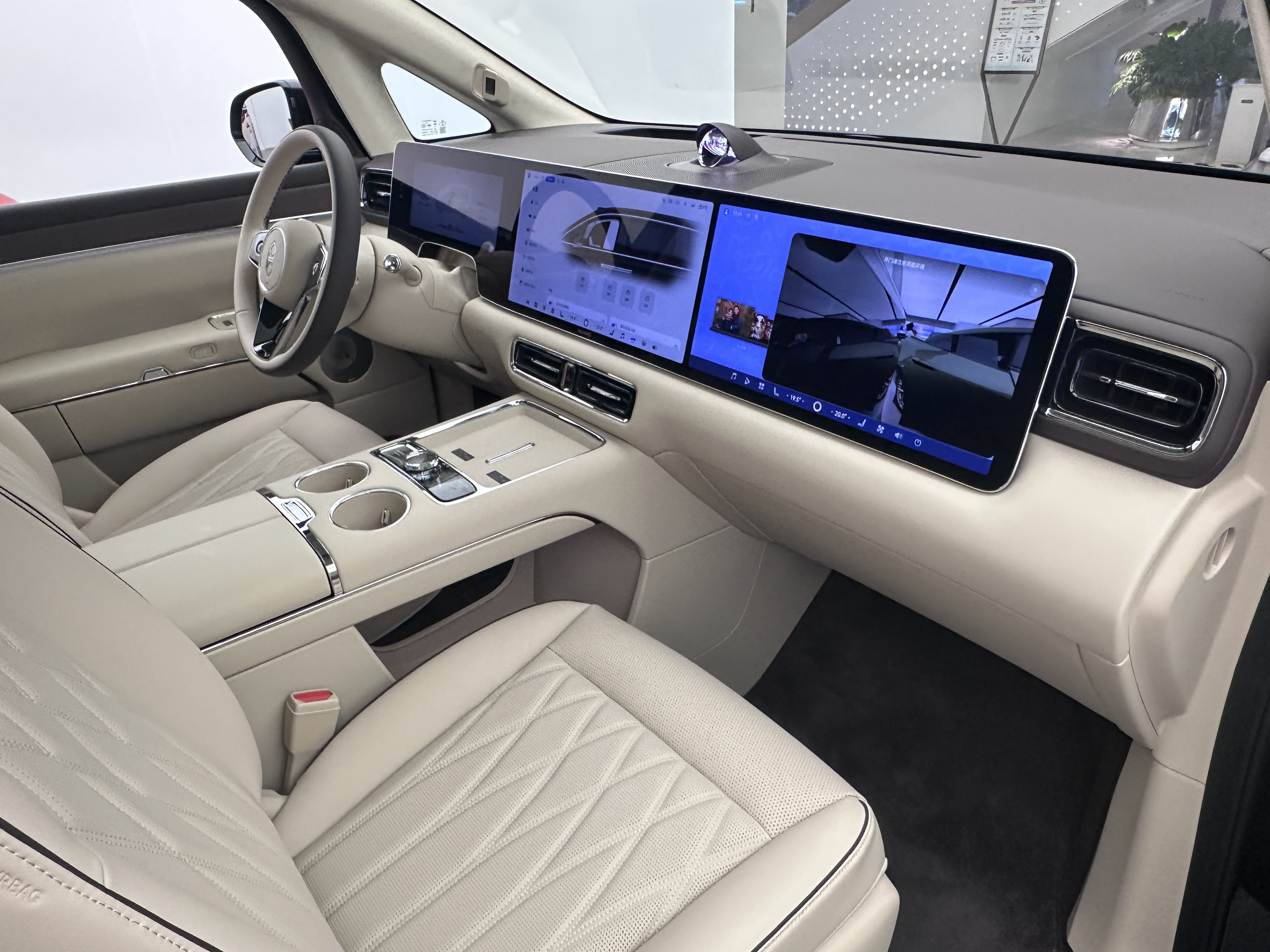
Interior

=== Design ===
Based on spyshots from December 2025, the V9 uses a space-oriented design with short overhangs and a long wheelbase. A full-width light bar is present in the front. It uses the same design language as the other Luxeed models, with headlight clusters similar to what the R7 uses, a grille is located at the bottom, and there is chrome trim beneath the light bar.

The V9 has a drag coefficient of 0.253C_{d}.

=== Features ===
Like the SAIC H5, the V9 minivan uses a conventional and mechanical door handles rather than the electronic hidden handles. Cameras are visible on the front fenders. There are hidden doors rail towards the rear. As with the front, the back of the V9 will also use a full-width light bar as the taillight. A-pillar triangular windows are used to enhance visibility and reduce blind spots. Huawei's ADS driver-assistance system system supporting Level 3 autonomous driving will also be used. The infotainment will use the HarmonyOS system. The interior uses a 3-row, 6-seat layout with zero-gravity seats for the front row. The second-row seats are electronically controlled and can move around; they also feature leg rests as well as heating and ventilation. The second and third row seats can be folded down when the "double bed mode" is activated.

The interior features a 12.3-inch digital instrument cluster supplemented by a heads-up display, dual 17.2-inch 3.4K resolution LCD touchscreens serving as the central infotainment display and passenger entertainment display, and an optional 21.4-inch 3K-resolution ceiling mounted rear passenger entertainment display.

It uses the highest specification Huawei Qiankun ADS 5 ADAS system, with a sensor suite consisting of one roof-mounted 896-line LiDAR, three wide-angle side and rear facing LiDARs, 5 mmWave radars, 11 cameras, and 12 ultrasonic sensors, and is capable of Level 2 assisted driving on highway and urban roads.

The second row seats have a 'zero-gravity' recline mode including a power footrest, and can rotate 45-degrees to ease entry and up to 180-degrees to provide a face-to-face layout seating configuration.

The V9 is equipped with a dual-chamber air suspension system with up to 50 mm (2.0 in) of ride height adjustment and up to 7-degrees of rear-wheel steering as standard for a turning radius of . The V9 is also planned to include an oxygen generator.

== Powertrain ==
The V9 is expected to use Huawei's DriveONE powertrain and will ride on an 800-volt silicon carbide platform. It was expected be offered with both battery electric and range-extended powertrains. Initial reports said that the electric range of the EREV model will be at least 400 kilometres (250 mi) and the EV model will use Huawei and CATL's Jujing (Chinese: 巨鲸; lit. 'giant whale') battery that has a 100 kWh capacity and can support ultra-fast charging capabilities. The EREV version will have a range of at least 745 mi (1,199 km) and the EV version will be able to add 186.5 miles (300 km) of range in just 10 minutes.

The V9 has a choice of two battery packs: a 37 kWh lithium iron phosphate battery with an electric range of 158 km (98 mi) and weighing 290 kg (639 lb), and a 53.3 kWh nickel manganese cobalt battery with an electric range of 210–223 km (130–139 mi) and weighing 302 kg (666 lb).

As of October 2026, only rear- and all-wheel drive variants of the range-extender variant with the 53.4kWh NMC battery pack have gone on sale since May 2026. It uses a 1.5-liter turbocharged inline-4 petrol engine outputting 141 hp (105 kW; 143 PS) (154 hp (115 kW; 156 PS) gross) at 5,200rpm and 220 N⋅m (162 lb⋅ft) of torque at 2,500rpm, and is claimed to have a peak thermal efficiency of 44.5%.

Specifications
Model	Battery		Engine	Power	Electric range		20–80% charge	0–100 km/h (62 mph)	Top speed	Kerb weight
Model	Type	Weight	Engine	Power	WLTP	CLTC	20–80% charge	0–100 km/h (62 mph)	Top speed	Kerb weight
RWD	53.4 kWh NMC CATL	297 kg (655 lb)	1.5 L SQRH4J15 I4 turbo 141 hp (105 kW; 143 PS)	305 hp (227 kW; 309 PS)	223 km (139 mi)	305 km (190 mi)	15 min	9.3 s	190 km/h (118 mph)	2,790 kg (6,151 lb)
AWD	53.4 kWh NMC CATL	297 kg (655 lb)	1.5 L SQRH4J15 I4 turbo 141 hp (105 kW; 143 PS)	512 hp (382 kW; 519 PS)	210 km (130 mi)	285 km (177 mi)	15 min	5.9 s	190 km/h (118 mph)	2,870–2,940 kg (6,327–6,482 lb)

== Sales ==
The Luxeed announced that the 30,000th V9 rolled of the production line on 21 October 2026, claiming it was the best-selling MPV priced above 400,000 RMB for four months in a row.
