= Luxeed S7 =

Battery electric executive sedan

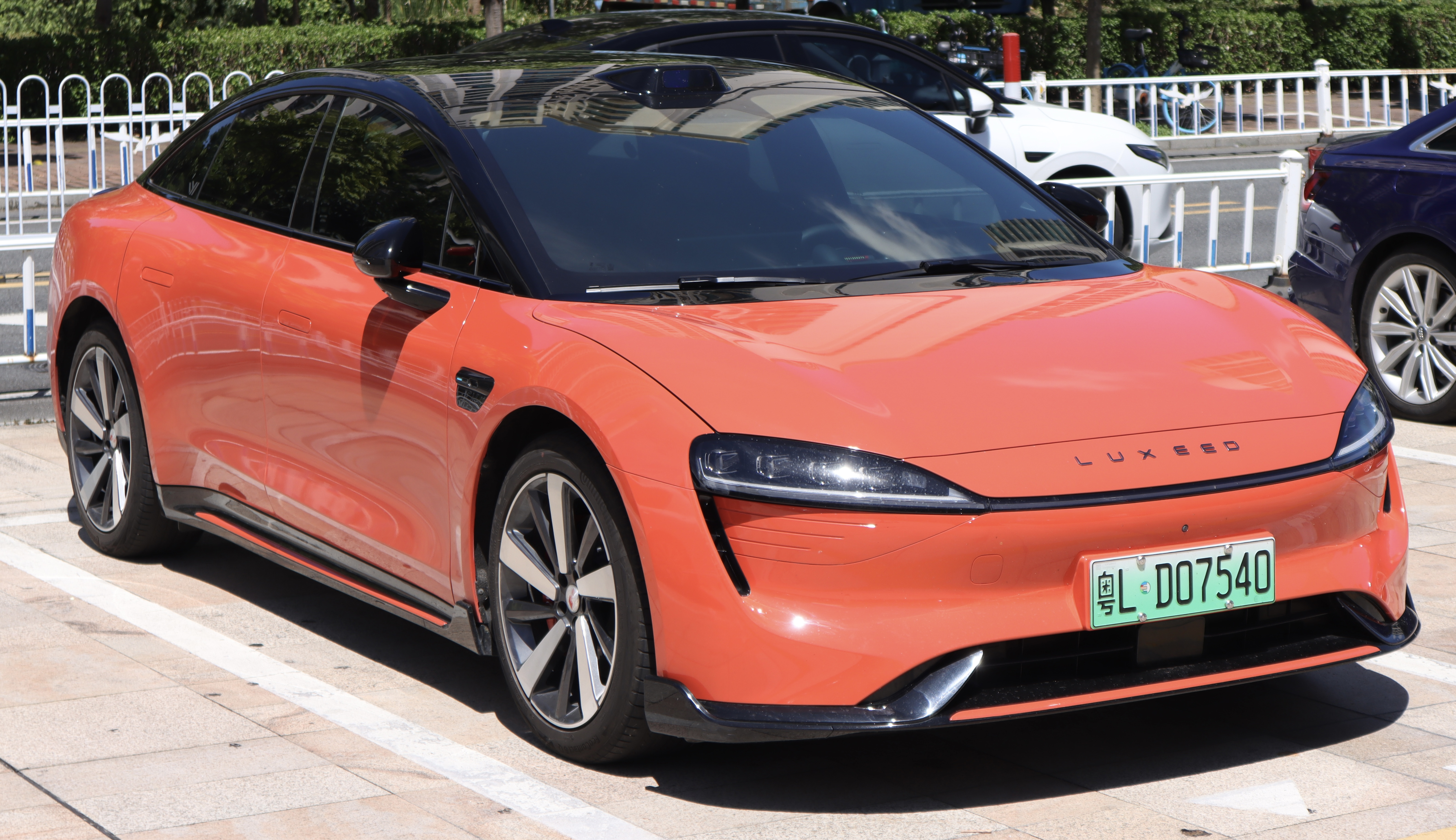
- Luxeed S7 (pre-facelift)

Overview
- Manufacturer: Luxeed (Chery)
- Model code: EH3
- Production: 2023–present
- Assembly: China: Wuhu

Body and chassis
- Class: Executive car (E)
- Body style: 4-door sedan
- Layout: Pro, Max and Max+: Rear-motor, rear-wheel drive; Max RS and Ultra: Dual-motor, all-wheel drive
- Platform: Chery E0X platform
- Related: Chery Fulwin T11; Exeed Sterra ES; Exeed Sterra ET; Luxeed R7; Luxeed V9

Powertrain
- Electric motor: 150 kW front induction asynchronous 215 kW rear permanent magnet synchronous
- Battery: 82 or 100 kWh on Huawei Giant Whale 800 V platform (batteries not confirmed to be 800 V)
- Electric range: 550–855 km (342–531 mi) CLTC

Dimensions
- Wheelbase: 2,950 mm (116.1 in)
- Length: 4,971 mm (195.7 in)
- Width: 1,963 mm (77.3 in)
- Height: 1,474 mm (58.0 in)
- Curb weight: 1,975–2,170 kg (4,354–4,784 lb)

The Luxeed S7 (Chinese: 智界S7; pinyin: Zhìjiè S7) is a battery electric executive sedan produced by Chinese automobile manufacturer Luxeed, a premium EV brand of Chery in collaboration with HIMA. Production of the vehicle started in 2023. The Luxeed S7 is a sister model with Exeed Sterra ES which are similar in size and share the same platform.

== Overview ==
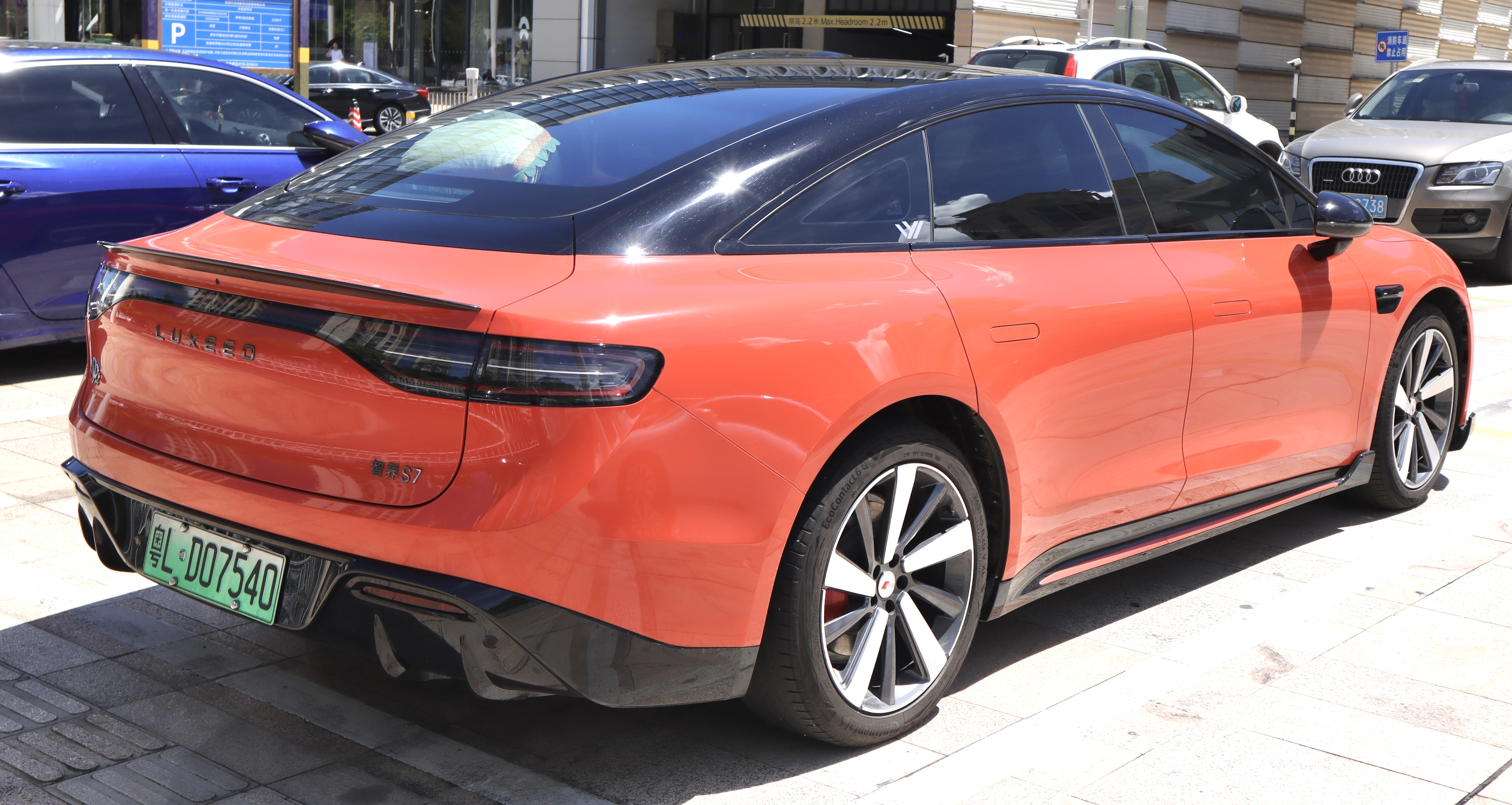
Rear view

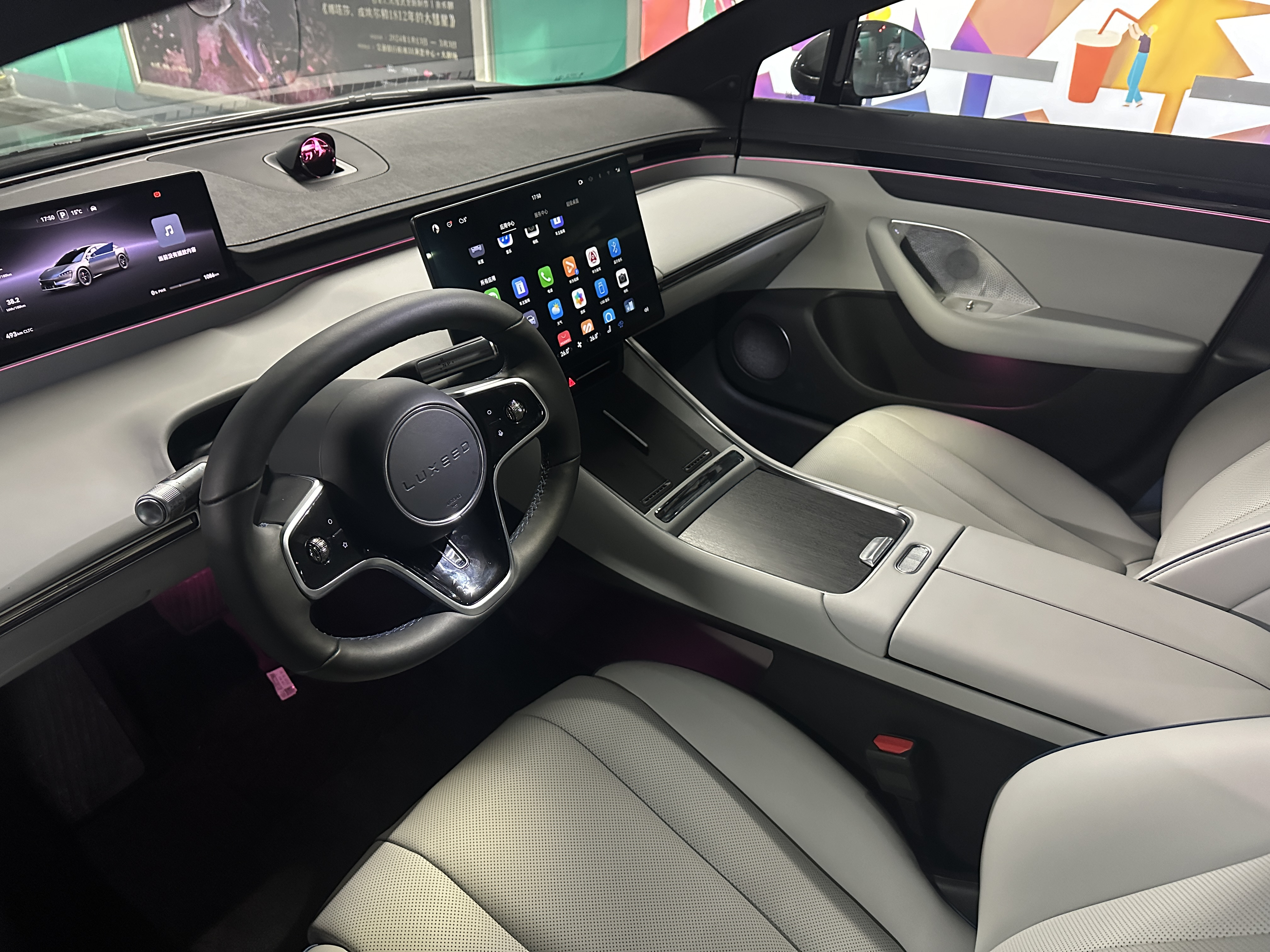
Interior

In July 2023, the first camouflaged prototypes of a new car originally intended to join Huawei's HIMA brand Aito were photographed. A month later, it was announced that Huawei was creating a second subsidiary called Luxeed, whose first vehicle was the large S7 sedan. This time, the partner to develop a Huawei car was the Chinese automotive company Chery, which was responsible for, among others, for providing the floor plate and production capacity.

The passenger cabin has an oval steering wheel and a raised digital instrument cluster screen. The central touchscreen has a diagonal of 12.3 inches. Huawei was responsible, among others, for: for providing the HarmonyOS multimedia system, as well as the extensive ADS 2.0 semi-autonomous driving system supported by LiDAR placed at the edge of the windshield, as well as side cameras scanning the surroundings.

=== 2025 facelift ===
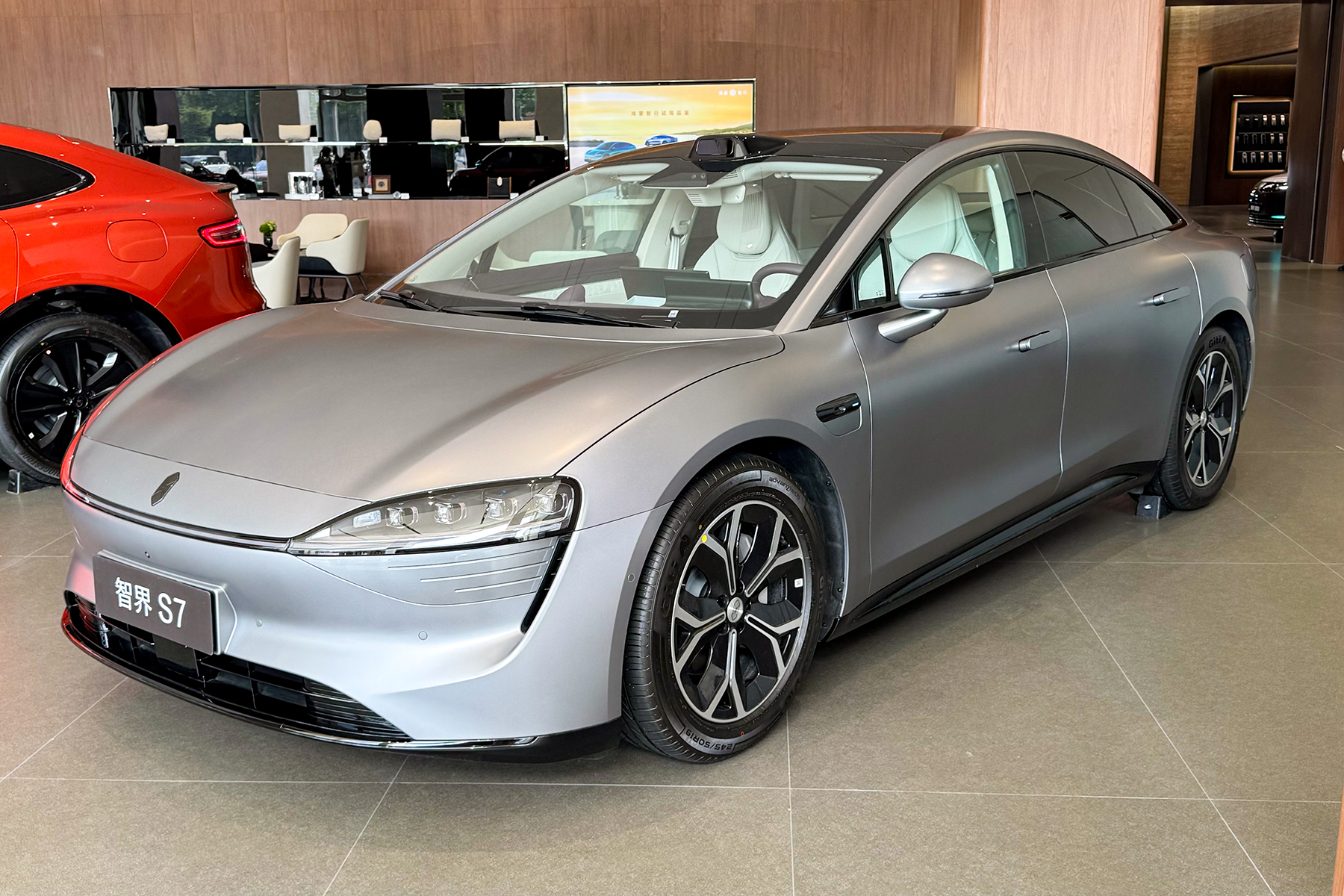
Luxeed S7 (facelift)

The facelifted S7 was unveiled on 30 August 2025. New Huawei technology is added to the vehicle, including the ADS 4 system. It also gets a 192-channel LiDAR, a rear-facing high-precision solid-state LiDAR and five 4D millimetre wave radars as standard. It also features the brand's new logo at the front.

== Specifications ==
The S7 is a fully electric car that went on sale in a rear-wheel drive or AWD specification. The first one generates 288 horsepower (215 kW; 292 PS) from a single electric motor located on the rear axle, while the second powertrain option makes 489 horsepower (365 kW; 496 PS) from a dual-motor all-wheel drive system. It is available with three sizes of battery packs supplied by CATL: 62 kWh with a range of 550 kilometres (342 mi) according to the Chinese CLTC standard, as well as 82 kWh (705 km (438 mi) of range for RWD and 630 km (391 mi) for AWD) and 100 kWh with a range of 855 kilometres (531 mi).

== Safety ==
C-NCAP (2021) test results 2024 Luxeed S7 Max RWD long-range intelligent driving version
Category		%
Overall:	5 /5 stars	89.9%
Occupant protection:		93.42%
Vulnerable road users:		67.08%
Active safety:		95.30%

== Sales ==
Year	China
2023	306
2024	21,669
2025	12,098

== See also ==
- Harmony Intelligent Mobility Alliance
