= Exeed Sterra ES =

Full-size sedan

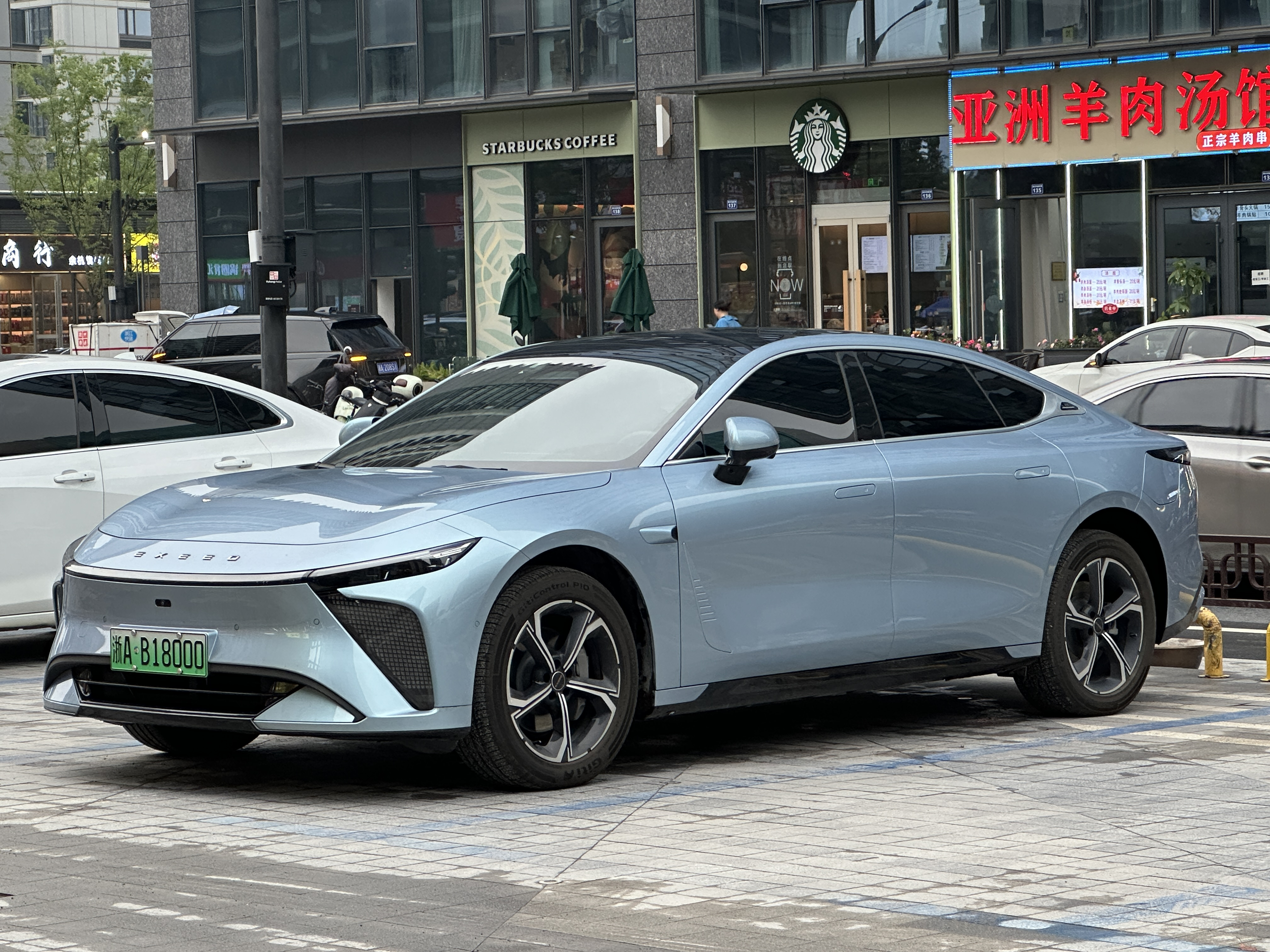

Overview
- Manufacturer: Exeed (Chery)
- Model code: E03
- Also called: Exeed ES (2026); Exlantix ES (export); Exeed ES7 (2025)
- Production: 2023–present
- Assembly: China: Wuhu, Anhui

Body and chassis
- Class: Full-size car (E)
- Body style: 4-door sedan; 5-door station wagon (ES7 GT)
- Layout: Rear motor, rear-wheel drive; Dual-motor, all-wheel drive
- Platform: E0X platform
- Related: Chery Fulwin T11; Exeed Sterra ET; Freelander 8; Luxeed R7; Luxeed S7; Luxeed V9

Powertrain
- Engine: Petrol range extender: 1.5 L SQRH4J15 I4 turbo
- Electric motor: 1× 1XM AC permanent magnet synchronous (RWD); 2× 1YM AC permanent magnet synchronous (AWD)
- Power output: 185–353 kW (248–473 hp; 252–480 PS)
- Transmission: 1-speed direct-drive
- Battery: 32.7 kWh LFP Gotion; 41.2 kWh LFP Gotion; 60.7 kWh blade LFP FinDreams; 66.4 kWh LFP FinDreams; 77 kWh Shenxing LFP CATL; 79.9 kWh NMC + LFP CATL; 97.682 kWh NMC CATL; 100 kWh Qilin NMC CATL
- Range: 1,550–1,645 km (963–1,022 mi) (EREV)
- Electric range: 550–905 km (342–562 mi) (EV); 205 km (127 mi) (EREV)

Dimensions
- Wheelbase: 3,000 mm (118.1 in)
- Length: 4,945 mm (194.7 in)
- Width: 1,978 mm (77.9 in)
- Height: 1,467–1,489 mm (57.8–58.6 in)
- Kerb weight: 1,870–2,285 kg (4,123–5,038 lb)

The Exeed Sterra ES (Chinese: 星纪元ES; pinyin: xīng jì yuán ES), known as the Exlantix ES outside the Chinese market, is a battery electric and range extended full-size sedan produced by Chinese automobile manufacturer Exeed, a premium brand of Chery. Production of the vehicle started in late 2023. The Sterra ES is a sister model to the Luxeed S7; both models are similar in size and share the same platform.

== Overview ==
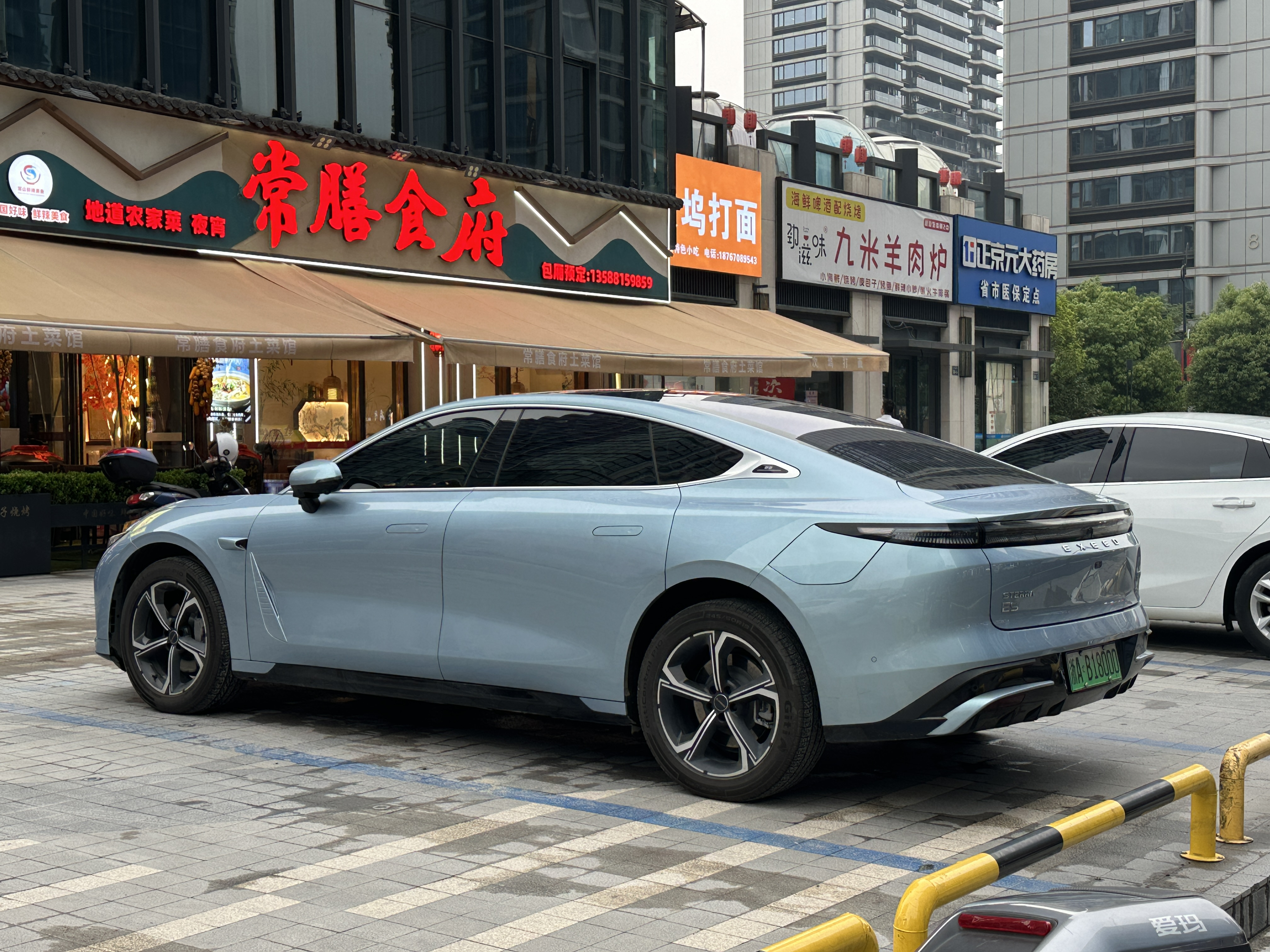
Rear view

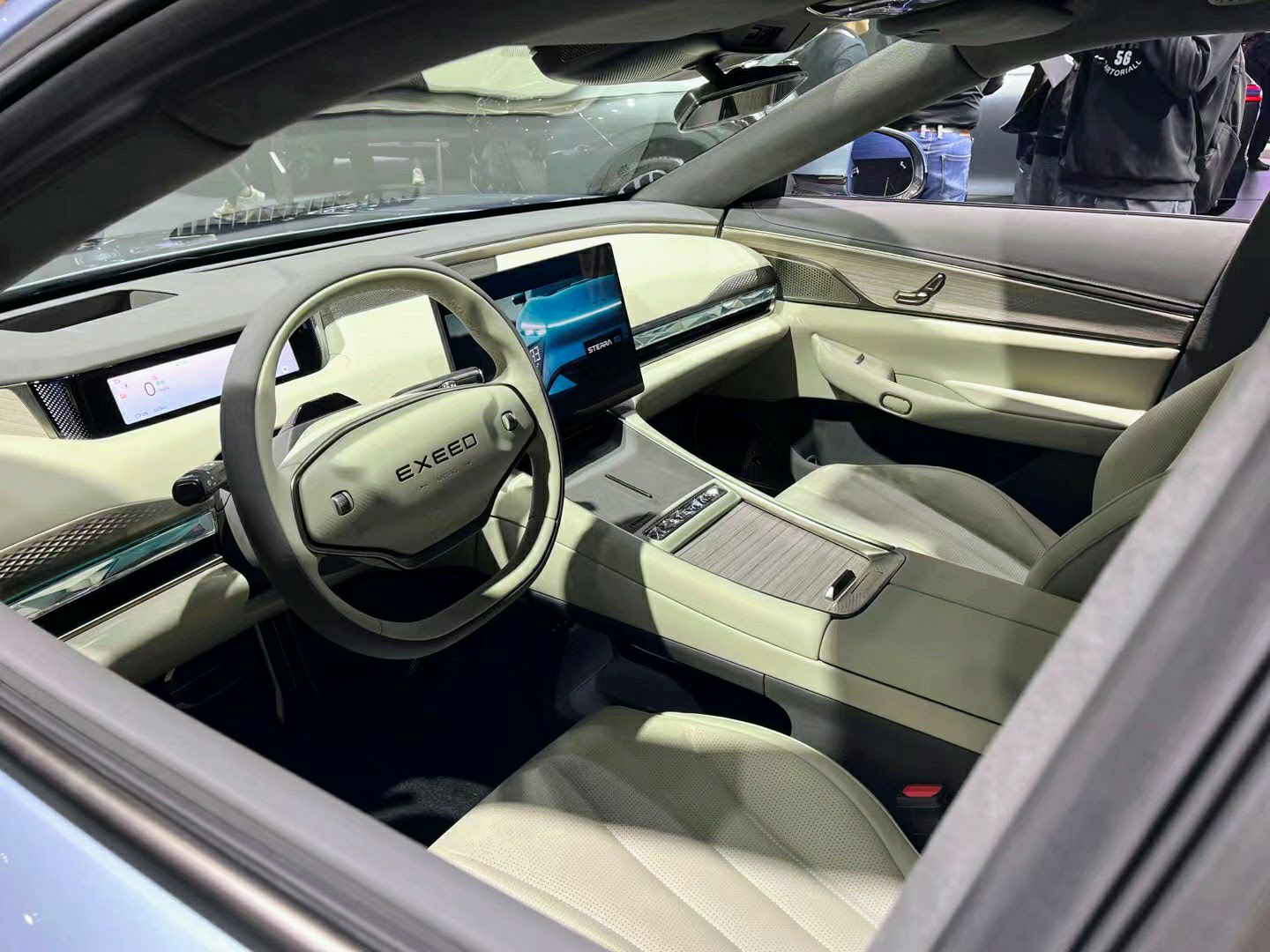
Interior

Exlantix ES

Rear view

Originally codenamed E03, the Sterra ES was revealed as a prototype in April 2023, at Auto Shanghai with a coefficient of drag of 0.205 C_{d}.

The interior features both a full LCD instrument panel and a 16 in (41 cm) floating center touchscreen with an AR-HUD digital head-up display, a Bose audio system, and mobile phone wireless charging. The operating system is Huawei's HarmonyOS with an addition of Chery's LION AI system that supports voice control, facial recognition, AR navigation, driving assistance, internet services, and smart home functions, etc.

=== 2025 update ===
In August 2024 for the 2025 model year, the Sterra ES had its powertrain updated with specifications similar to the Sterra ET. All pure electric versions now use an 800-volt electrical architecture, and the battery have been slimmed down to new two options. The standard battery is a 77 kWh LFP pack supplied by CATL with a peak DC charging power of 420 kW, allowing for a 30–80% DC charging time of nine minutes. It can be paired with the previously used 230 kW (310 hp; 310 PS) single-motor rear-wheel drive or 353 kW (473 hp; 480 PS) dual-motor all-wheel drive configurations. The top trim is available with a 100 kWh CATL-supplied NMC pack with a peak DC charging power of 297 kW, and is available exclusively with the all-wheel drive powertrain.

== Specifications ==
=== Battery electric ===
The Sterra ES uses the company's E0X all-electric platform, which supports a 800V high-voltage fast-charging system for higher trim level models and 400V fast-charging system for lower trim level models. The high-voltage fast-charging system can charge up to 150 kilometres (93 mi) of range within 5 minutes of charging time.

The base variant of the Sterra ES uses a single rear motor outputting 185 kW (248 hp; 252 PS), while higher trims receive a 230 kW (310 hp; 310 PS) motor. Standard variants of the Sterra ES are available with a selection of different batteries including a 60.7 kWh BYD-supplied LFP Blade battery with a CLTC range of 550 km (340 mi), a 66.4 kWh battery with a CLTC range of 605 km (376 mi) and is the only option to use a 400-volt platform, a 79.9 kWh CATL NMC-LFP hybrid cell chemistry battery with a CLTC range of 720 km (450 mi) and power consumption of 11.7 kWh/100 km, and a 97.7 kWh CATL sourced NMC battery with a CLTC range of 905 km (562 mi) for the long range top trim level.

The top-level dual motor performance variant of the Sterra ES was first launched in December 2023, which uses a 123 kW (167 PS; 165 hp) front motor and 230 kW (310 PS; 310 hp) motor in the rear powered by CATL's NMC-LFP hybrid cell chemistry batteries, achieving a 0 to 100 km/h (62 mph) acceleration time below 3.8 seconds. The higher trim levels of the Sterra ES are also equipped with air suspension and CDC electromagnetic damping system, as well as an interactive signal display under the headlamps.

=== Range extender ===
A range-extender version of the ES was introduced in 2025 with two variants. They both use a 1.5-litre turbocharged direct-injected all-aluminium inline-four petrol engine using the Miller cycle and with a compression ratio of 14.5:1, achieving a claimed 44.5% peak thermal efficiency. It outputs 115 kW (154 hp; 156 PS) at 5,200 rpm and 220 N⋅m (160 lb⋅ft) of torque at 2,500–4,000 rpm, and does not mechanically drive the wheels.

Power is supplied by a choice of two Gotion-supplied LFP batteries, a 34.7 kWh pack for rear-wheel drive models and a 41.2 kWh pack for all-wheel drive models. The latter is capable of 2.4C DC charging with a peak power of 107 kW allowing for a 20–80% charging time of 17.5 minutes. All variants have an electric CLTC range rating of 205 km (127 mi), with rear-wheel drive and all-wheel drive models capable of 1,645 km (1,022 mi) and 1,570 km (980 mi) of total range, respectively.

Powertrains
Trim	Year	Battery	Power	Torque	Range (CLTC)	0–100 km/h (62 mph)	Top speed
EV
Pro	2024	60.7 kWh LFP Blade FinDreams	185 kW (248 hp; 252 PS)	356 N⋅m (263 lb⋅ft)	550 km (340 mi)	7.1 s	200 km/h (120 mph)
Plus	2024	66.4 kWh LFP FinDreams 400V	185 kW (248 hp; 252 PS)	356 N⋅m (263 lb⋅ft)	605 km (376 mi)	7.1 s	200 km/h (120 mph)
Max	2024	79.9 kWh NMC-LFP CATL	230 kW (310 hp; 310 PS)	425 N⋅m (313 lb⋅ft)	720 km (450 mi)	5.6 s	200 km/h (120 mph)
Max+	2024	97.7 kWh NMC CATL	230 kW (310 hp; 310 PS)	425 N⋅m (313 lb⋅ft)	905 km (562 mi)	5.6 s	200 km/h (120 mph)
Ultra 4WD	2024	79.9 kWh NMC-LFP CATL	353 kW (473 hp; 480 PS)	663 N⋅m (489 lb⋅ft)	650 km (400 mi)	3.7 s	210 km/h (130 mph)
Pro	2025–	77 kWh LFP Shenxing CATL	230 kW (310 hp; 310 PS)	425 N⋅m (313 lb⋅ft)	680 km (420 mi)	5.9 s	200 km/h (120 mph)
Pro 4WD	2025–	77 kWh LFP Shenxing CATL	353 kW (473 hp; 480 PS)	663 N⋅m (489 lb⋅ft)	605 km (376 mi)	3.9 s	210 km/h (130 mph)
Ultra	2025–	100 kWh NMC Qilin CATL	353 kW (473 hp; 480 PS)	663 N⋅m (489 lb⋅ft)	710 km (440 mi)	3.9 s	210 km/h (130 mph)
EREV
Plus, Pro, Max	2025–	34.7 kWh LFP Gotion	195 kW (261 hp; 265 PS)	324 N⋅m (239 lb⋅ft)	Electric: 205 km (127 mi) Total: 1,570–1,645 km (976–1,022 mi)	7.6 s	205 km/h (127 mph)
Ultra 4WD	2025–	41.16 kWh LFP Gotion	345 kW (463 hp; 469 PS)	634 N⋅m (468 lb⋅ft)	Electric: 205 km (127 mi) Total: 1,570–1,645 km (976–1,022 mi)	4.6 s	190 km/h (120 mph)

== Safety ==
=== C-NCAP ===
C-NCAP (2021) test results 2024 Exeed Sterra ES Max Long-range
Category		%
Overall:	5 /5 stars	86.2%
Occupant protection:		87.52%
Vulnerable road users:		68.04%
Active safety:		93.91%

=== Euro NCAP ===
Euro NCAP test results Exlantix ES (LHD) (2025)
Test	Points	%
Overall:	5 /5 stars	
Adult occupant:	35.2	88%
Child occupant:	40.2	82%
Pedestrian:	48.5	77%
Safety assist:	13.9	77%

== Sales ==
Year	China		
Year	EV	EREV	Total
2023	113	—	113
2024	3,784	—	3,784
2025	1,169	10,928	12,097
