= Luxeed R7 =

Mid-size crossover SUV

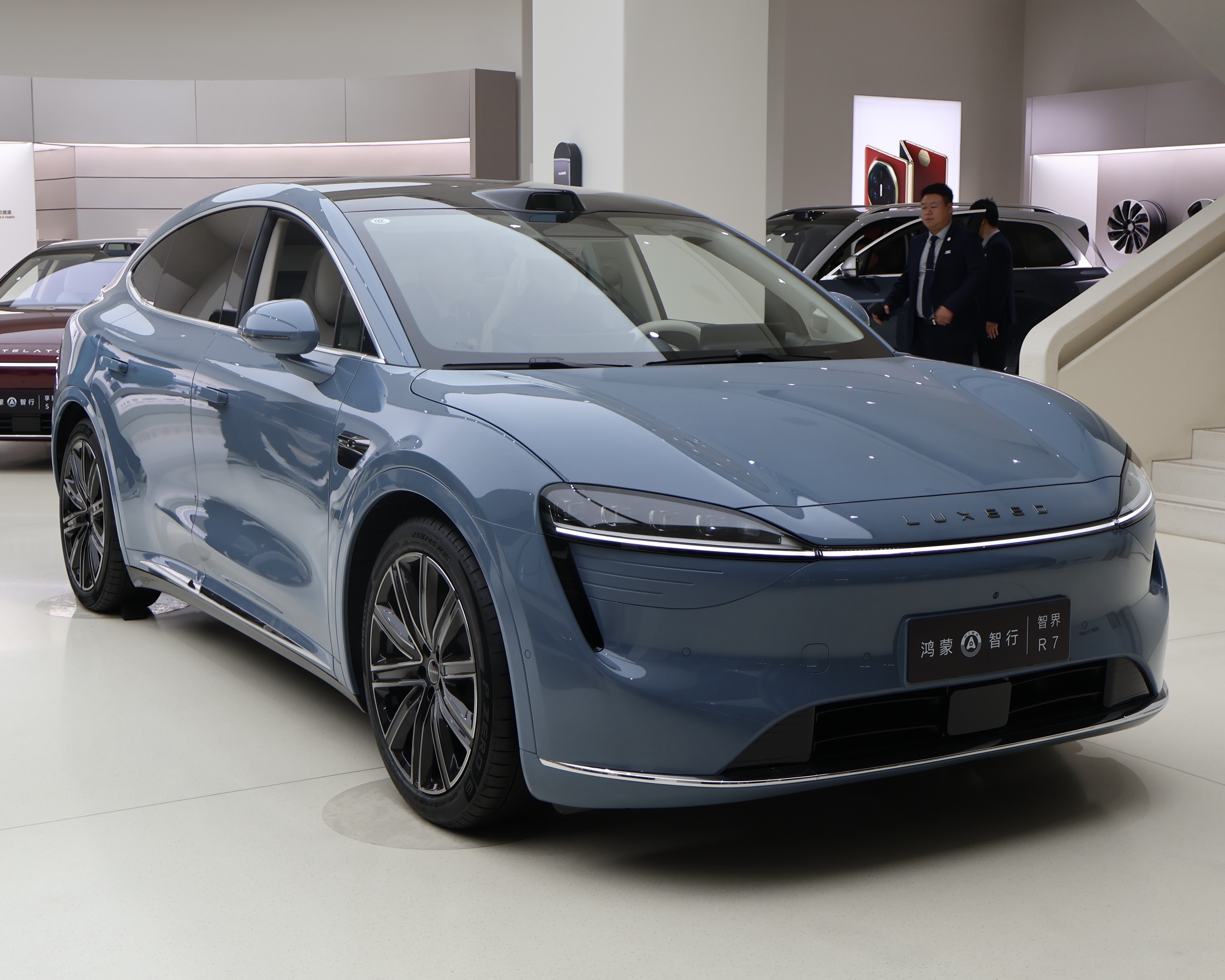
- Luxeed R7 (pre-facelift)

Overview
- Manufacturer: Luxeed (Chery)
- Model code: EHY
- Production: 2024–present
- Assembly: China: Wuhu

Body and chassis
- Class: Mid-size SUV
- Body style: 5-door coupe SUV
- Layout: Battery electric: Rear-motor, rear-wheel drive; Dual-motor, all-wheel-drive; Range-extended EV: Front-engine, rear-motor, rear-wheel-drive; Front-engine, dual-motor, all-wheel-drive
- Platform: Chery E0X platform
- Related: Exeed Sterra ET; Exeed Sterra ES; Luxeed S7

Powertrain
- Engine: Petrol range extender: 1.5 L SQRH4J15 turbo I4
- Electric motor: Induction (front); PMSM (rear)
- Battery: 36 kWh LFP CATL; 53.4 kWh NMC CATL; 82 kWh NMC-LFP mix CATL; 82 kWh NMC CALB; 100 kWh NMC CATL
- Electric range: 667–855 km (414–531 mi) (EV, CLTC); 201–284 km (125–176 mi) (EREV, WLTP); 251–331 km (156–206 mi) (EREV, CLTC)

Dimensions
- Wheelbase: 2,950 mm (116.1 in)
- Length: 4,956 mm (195.1 in)
- Width: 1,981 mm (78.0 in)
- Height: 1,634 mm (64.3 in)
- Curb weight: 2,148–2,388 kg (4,736–5,265 lb)

The Luxeed R7 (Chinese: 智界R7; pinyin: Zhìjiè R7) is a battery electric and range extender mid-size coupe SUV produced by Chinese automobile manufacturer Luxeed, a premium EV brand of Chery in collaboration with HIMA. Production of the vehicle started in 2024. The Luxeed R7 is a sister model of the Exeed Sterra ET, which is similar in size and shares the same platform with the R7.

== Overview ==
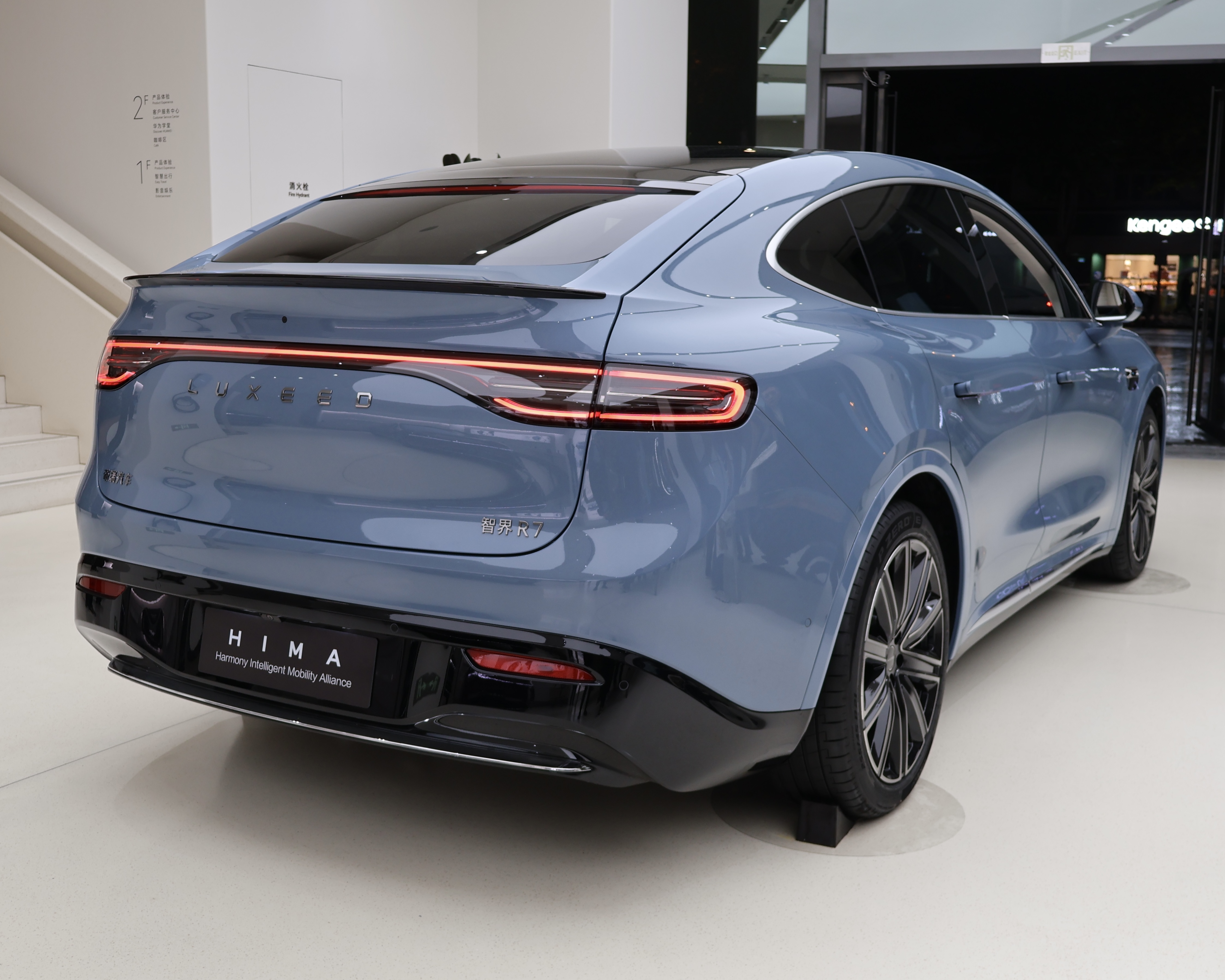
Rear view

Less than a year after the June 2024 inauguration of the new brand Luxeed from HIMA, the automotive branch of the technology giant Huawei, a second model was presented, complementing the portfolio previously created by the large, higher-class S7 sedan.

The R7 took the form of a large coupe SUV, which extensively reproduced the styling features of the first product of the Chinese brand. The body has gained rounded wheel arches, a gently sloping roofline with a clearly marked rear spoiler line, and a large, wide light blend connecting the oval lamps. The front fascia is dominated by large headlights, cut at the lower edge, and other characteristic details include retractable door handles, a radar segment at the edge of the windshield and a glass roof.

The passenger cabin has a light tone, with a characteristic oval steering wheel and high-mounted 12.3-inch digital instrument cluster protruding towards the windshield. At the center of the dashboard there is a 15.6-inch touchscreen infotainment system using Huawei's HarmonyOS software and working with the Huawei Sound system.

=== Facelift (2025) ===
On August 1, 2025, photos of the facelifted R7 were officially revealed by Luxeed, with the R7 receiving new headlights and also debuts the new logo of the Luxeed brand. Alongside the teasers for the facelift is a new Aurora Green color.

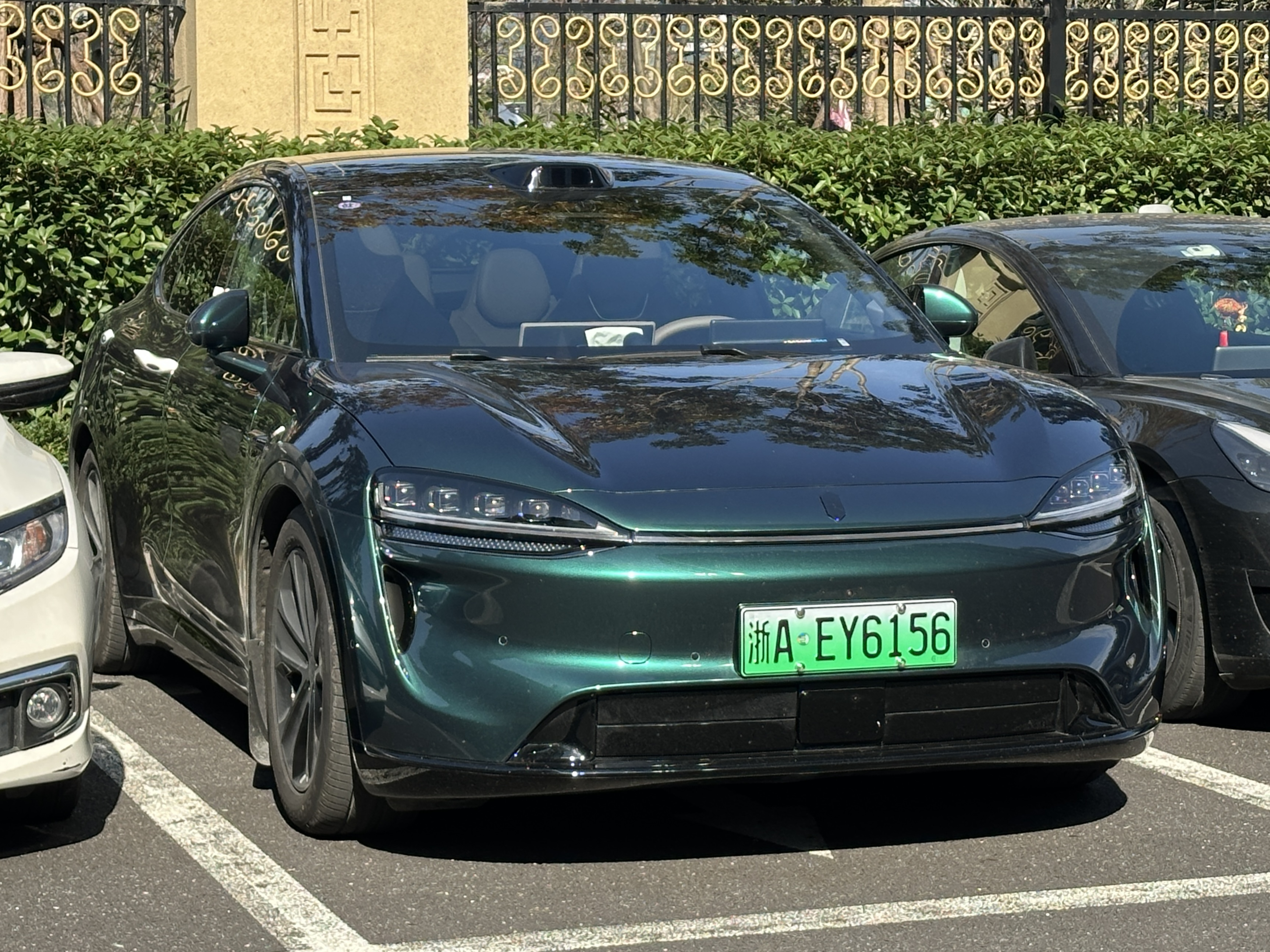
Luxeed R7 2025 (facelift)

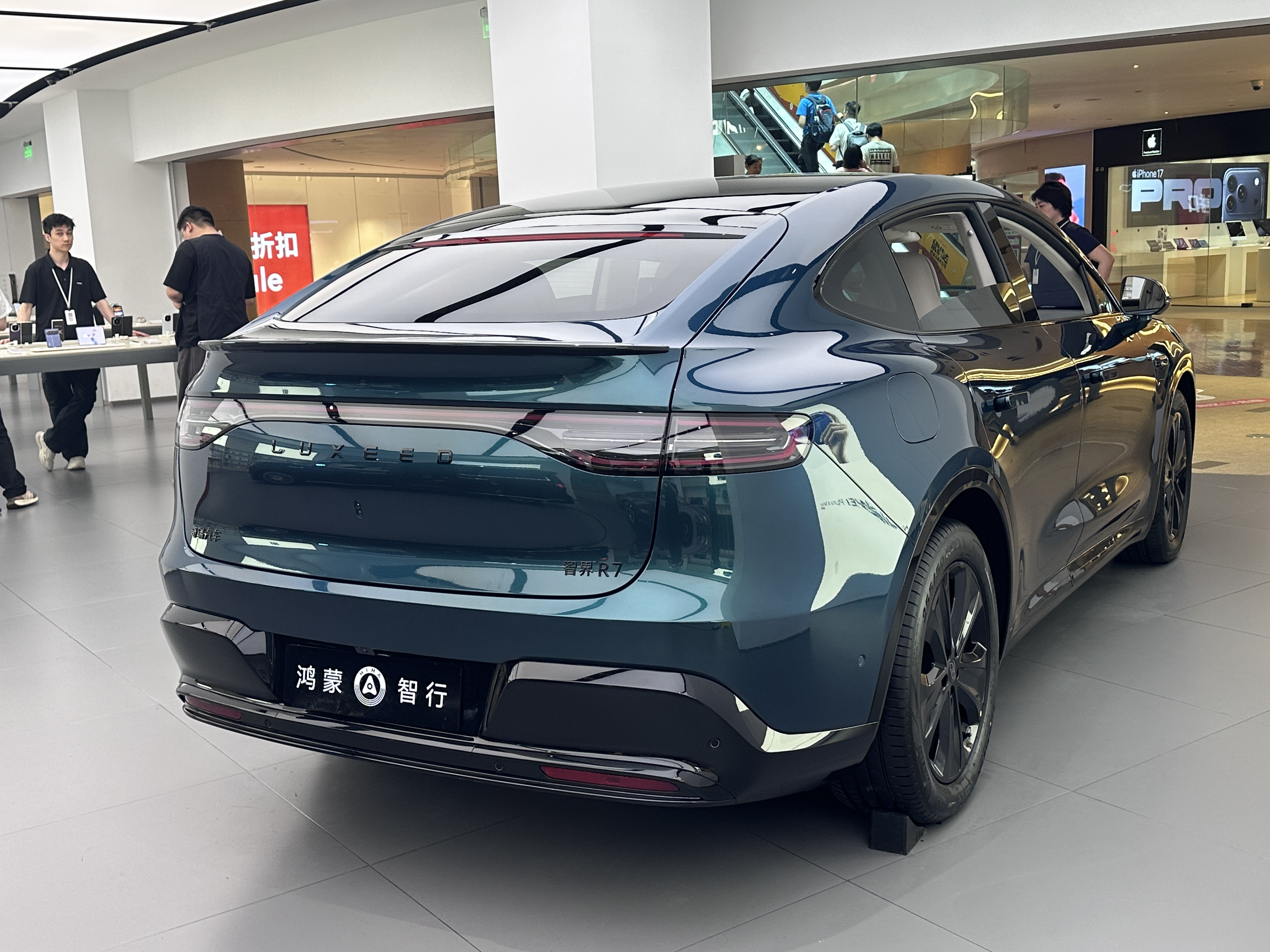
Rear view

=== 2027 facelift ===
The R7 was updated again on 28 September 2026 marketed as the 2027 model year, receiving the latest ADAS and interior technology an updated powertrain. Luxeed says they invested 500 million yuan into developing the refresh.

The exterior receives minor changes including modified headlights, new Luxeed logo, pocket-style door handles replacing the previous electronic flush handles, new wheel options, and two new paint options: Space Titanium Silver and Star Rose Pink.

The interior receives significant changes to the layout. The dashboard now contains dual 17.2-inch central infotainment touchscreen and passenger infotainment displays with integrated together with thin bezels, while the instrument cluster uses a smaller 8.88-inch display integrated into the dashboard and is now complimented by an optional 26-inch heads-up display. The steering wheel has been updated with a flat-bottom design and the center console has been redesigned and has split-opening storage bins. It now has USB-C ports which output 100 watts, up from 66 watts, and a household 220 V outlet has been added. The panoramic sunroof now has a sunshade. The front-row 'zero-gravity' reclining seats with footrest has been made optional, the headrest speakers are now standard, and the rear seats no longer have a massaging function.

The assisted driving system has been upgraded to Huawei's Qiankun ADS 5, which upgrades the roof-mounted LiDAR to Huawei's latest 896-line sensor, compared to the original 192-line LiDAR.

The powertrain has been updated and electric variants receive new battery packs and motors resulting in higher range ratings.

== Specifications ==
The R7 has a fully electric drivetrain, which is equipped with one or two motors. The base variant has a 82kWh battery pack paired with a 288 horsepower (215 kW; 292 PS) rear motor and a CLTC range rating of 667 kilometres (414 mi), while the top version has a 100kWh pack paired with a 489 horsepower (365 kW; 496 PS) dual-motor all-wheel drive system with 855 kilometres (531 mi) of range. It uses an 800V electrical architecture, and is equipped with a fast charging system.

For the 2027 model year update, the battery packs for the EV version have been updated and deliver more range while having similar capacities. The rear motor has also been updated with a new motor that is more powerful but outputs less torque.

Specifications
Model year	Battery		Engine	Motor		Power	Torque	Electric range		30–80% charge time	0–100 km/h (62 mph) time	Top speed	Kerb weight
Model year	Type	Weight	Engine	Front	Rear	Power	Torque	WLTP	CLTC	30–80% charge time	0–100 km/h (62 mph) time	Top speed	Kerb weight
EREV
2025	37 kWh LFP CATL	290 kg (639 lb)	1.5 L SQRH4J15 I4 turbo; 148 hp (110 kW; 150 PS) @5,200rpm, 220 N⋅m (162 lb⋅ft) @2,500rpm	—	227 kW Huawei DriveONE TZ210XYAP4 PMSM	304 hp (227 kW; 308 PS)	320 N⋅m (236 lb⋅ft)	201 km (125 mi)	251 km (156 mi)	15 min	7.4 sec	200 km/h (124 mph)	2,298 kg (5,066 lb)
2025	53.4 kWh NMC CATL	302 kg (666 lb)	1.5 L SQRH4J15 I4 turbo; 148 hp (110 kW; 150 PS) @5,200rpm, 220 N⋅m (162 lb⋅ft) @2,500rpm	—	227 kW Huawei DriveONE TZ210XYAP4 PMSM	304 hp (227 kW; 308 PS)	320 N⋅m (236 lb⋅ft)	284 km (176 mi)	360 km (224 mi)	15 min	7.4 sec	200 km/h (124 mph)	2,308 kg (5,088 lb)
2025	53.4 kWh NMC CATL	302 kg (666 lb)	1.5 L SQRH4J15 I4 turbo; 148 hp (110 kW; 150 PS) @5,200rpm, 220 N⋅m (162 lb⋅ft) @2,500rpm	155 kW Huawei DriveONE YS210XYA52 induction	227 kW Huawei DriveONE TZ210XYAP4 PMSM	512 hp (382 kW; 519 PS)	550 N⋅m (406 lb⋅ft)	258 km (160 mi)	331 km (206 mi)	15 min	4.9 sec	200 km/h (124 mph)	2,388 kg (5,265 lb)
BEV
2024	82 kWh NMC CALB	467–488 kg (1,030–1,076 lb)	—	—	215 kW Huawei DriveONE TZ210XYA02 PMSM	288 hp (215 kW; 292 PS)	396 N⋅m (292 lb⋅ft)		667 km (414 mi)	15 min	5.9 sec	200 km/h (124 mph)	2,148 kg (4,736 lb)
2024	100 kWh NMC CATL	524 kg (1,155 lb)	—	—	215 kW Huawei DriveONE TZ210XYA02 PMSM	288 hp (215 kW; 292 PS)	396 N⋅m (292 lb⋅ft)		802 km (498 mi)	15 min	5.9 sec	200 km/h (124 mph)	2,180 kg (4,806 lb)
2024	100 kWh NMC CATL	524 kg (1,155 lb)	—	150 kW Huawei DriveONE YS210XYA01 induction	215 kW Huawei DriveONE TZ210XYA02 PMSM	489 hp (365 kW; 496 PS)	673 N⋅m (496 lb⋅ft)		736 km (457 mi)	15 min	3.9 sec	200 km/h (124 mph)	2,320 kg (5,115 lb)
2027	81 kWh LFP CALB	575 kg (1,268 lb)	—	—	227 kW QT67TZ210D01 PMSM	304 hp (227 kW; 308 PS)	305 N⋅m (225 lb⋅ft)		705 km (438 mi)	15 min	7.2 sec	200 km/h (124 mph)	2,275 kg (5,016 lb)
2027	100 kWh NMC CATL	518 kg (1,142 lb)	—	—	227 kW QT67TZ210D01 PMSM	304 hp (227 kW; 308 PS)	305 N⋅m (225 lb⋅ft)		855 km (531 mi)	15 min	7.0 sec	200 km/h (124 mph)	2,220 kg (4,894 lb)
2027	100 kWh NMC CATL	518 kg (1,142 lb)	—	150 kW YS210XYA01 induction	227 kW QT67TZ210D01 PMSM	506 hp (377 kW; 513 PS)	582 N⋅m (429 lb⋅ft)		785 km (488 mi)	15 min	4.4 sec	200 km/h (124 mph)	2,340 kg (5,159 lb)

== Sales ==
Luxeed announced that cumulative deliveries for the R7 exceeded 120,000 units on 28 September 2026.

Year	China		
Year	Total	EV	EREV
2024	28,991	28,933	58
2025	80,466	58,017	22,395

== See also ==
- Harmony Intelligent Mobility Alliance
