= C-NCAP =

Passenger vehicle safety assessment program

The C-NCAP (Chinese: 中国新车评价规程) is a Chinese car safety assessment program. It is primarily modeled after safety standards established by Euro NCAP and is run by the China Automotive Technology and Research Center (Chinese: 中国汽车技术研究中心). The C-NCAP was first run in 2006 and has been updated every three years since, with new revisions for 2009, 2012, 2015, 2018, 2021 and 2024.

== Test protocol ==
The C-NCAP consists of a series of safety tests, including real, simulated and virtual vehicle impact tests, static evaluation of vehicle design, and performance testing of vehicle active safety systems.

=== Vehicle impact tests ===
The C-NCAP contains four mandatory and one optional crash tests that involve fully built production vehicles impacting barriers.

The first is a full-width perpendicular frontal impact against a non-deformable solid barrier which the vehicle is towed into at 55 km/h (34 mph), which is designed to simulate crashing a vehicle straight into a solid wall. This test specification is similar to NHTSA standards and is at slightly higher speed than the Euro NCAP.

A 50% overlap frontal impact test against a wheeled deformable barrier platform, which is designed to simulate a head-on collision with another vehicle across a median line, where only the driver's side half of the vehicles' front contact. Both the test vehicle and 1,400 kg (3,090 lb) automobile-shaped four-wheeled barrier platform travel at 50 km/h (31 mph) in opposite directions towards each other during the test; the deformable barrier is designed to simulate a vehicle's crumple zone. This test is identical to the one in the Euro NCAP; in the US, the NHTSA lacks a similar test, while the IIHS uses static barriers for their partial overlap impact tests.

The side impact test against a wheeled deformable barrier platform is designed to simulate a broadside collision where a vehicle perpendicularly impacts the doors of the vehicle. The barrier platform, which again has a deformable barrier simulating a vehicle's crumple zone, now weighs 1,700 kg (3,750 lb) and impacts the vehicle at 60 km/h (37 mph) and is centered 200 mm (7.9 in) behind the front passenger seat R-point. This test is conducted at a similar speed to the Euro NCAP and American organizations, but the barrier platform is at least 300 kg (660 lb) heavier than all but the IIHS test protocol, which is 200 kg (440 lb) higher.

The side impact test against a stationary solid 10-inch (254 mm) diameter cylinder, designed to simulate a vehicle that loses control and slides into a roadside pole, such as a street lamp or utility pole. The vehicle is loaded onto a sled at a 75-degree angle to the direction of impact, and the cylinder is aligned with the test dummy's head; the sled then pulls the vehicle into the cylinder at 32 km/h (20 mph). This test is comparable to the Euro NCAP and NHTSA protocols.

Test	Test speed			
Test	C-NCAP	Euro-NCAP	NHTSA	IIHS
Test	2024	2023	2015	2023
100% front impact - static solid barrier	55 km/h (34 mph)	50 km/h (31 mph)	56.3 km/h (35.0 mph)	–
50% front impact - rolling deforming barrier	50 + 50 km/h (31 + 31 mph) @1,400 kg (3,100 lb)		–	
40% front impact - static deforming barrier	–			64.4 km/h (40.0 mph)
25% front impact - static solid barrier	–			64.4 km/h (40.0 mph)
Side impact rolling deforming barrier	60 km/h (37 mph) @1,700 kg (3,750 lb)	60 km/h (37 mph) @1,400 kg (3,100 lb)	61.9 km/h (38.5 mph) @1,367 kg (3,014 lb)	60 km/h (37 mph) @1,900 kg (4,200 lb)
75° side impact rigid pole	32 km/h (20 mph)		32.2 km/h (20.0 mph)	–
Whiplash	20 km/h (12 mph) @11G peak	Low:16 km/h (9.9 mph) @5G; Medium:16 km/h (9.9 mph) @10G; High:24 km/h (15 mph) @7.5G	–	16 km/h (9.9 mph) @10G peak

==== Battery impact test ====
The bottom scraping test against a 150-millimetre (5.91 in) diameter solid hemispherical barrier, which simulates a vehicle running over large objects. The test is only applied to NEVs (plug-in battery electric vehicles) with externally mounted underbody battery packs. The first test is done to test potentially vulnerable areas along the battery pack's front edge, such as cooling system and wiring outlets; if there are none, this test is skipped and only the second test is done. The spherical barrier is set so the top is 30 millimetres (1.2 in) higher than the bottom of the battery pack and the vehicle is then aligned to center a vulnerable area, and then pulled over the barrier at 30 km/h (19 mph). The second test involves mounting the battery pack and accessories onto a wheeled platform tilted upwards at a 3-degree angle, then pulling the platform over the barrier at 20 km/h (12 mph), again aimed at vulnerable front edge locations. The tests are repeated for each potential weak spot on the battery pack.

After each test, the battery pack undergoes observation to ensure electrical isolation is maintained above 100 Ω/V, battery electrolyte leakage is below 5 liters (1.3 U.S. gal) within 30 minutes, and no fires or explosions occur. After all impact tests are completed, the battery pack is submerged under 1,000 millimetres (39.4 in) of water for 30 minutes, then removed from the water and observed for two hours. During this time, the battery temperature is monitored, and any fires or explosions lead to failure of the test.

==== Simulated tests ====
The whiplash test is done by placing the seat on a sled in a similar orientation to which it was originally mounted in the vehicle, to allow for several repeatable tests simulating rear-end collisions. It involves accelerating the sled with a triangle-shaped acceleration waveform with a peak of 11 G of acceleration over a 93-millisecond duration, resulting in a 20 km/h (12 mph) speed increase. This test is similar to the Euro NCAP Medium Severity and IIHS tests, but they have a lower speed and peak acceleration of 16 km/h (9.9 mph) and 10 G, respectively. The Euro NCAP Low and High Severity tests have different waveform shapes and lower peak acceleration, despite the latter having a higher speed differential of 24 km/h (15 mph).

Far-side occupant protection tests are used to ensure that the passenger on the opposite side of a side collision receives sufficient protection. This test can be conducted virtually in simulation software if certain conditions are met, including passing the side pole impact test without significant interior intrusion.

==== Virtual tests ====
The out-of-position occupant protection test is conducted virtually on simulation software, and is only conducted on vehicles equipped with Auto Emergency Braking (AEB) systems. The test evaluates collision protection after the passenger has been displaced by heavy AEB-triggered deceleration shortly before an impact similar to the 50% overlap frontal test.

== 2024 revision ==
Application of the 2024 revision of the C-NCAP tests started on July 1, 2024.

Changes compared to the 2021 revision include:

- Occupant protection
  - 100% front collision
    - Speed increased from 50->55kmh
    - 2nd row child thorax assessment changed
  - barrier side impact
    - Test speed increased 50->60kmh and weight 1400->1700kg
    - R point moved from previous 250mm? to 200mm, inline with EU
    - Change of deformable honeycomb from AE-MDB to SC-MDB
    - Previously excluded NEVs, now all vehicles
  - side pole collision
    - Was NEV only previously, now all vehicles
    - virtual far-side occupant protection tests
  - Whiplash test assessment method 'optimized'
  - Active safety bonus points
  - Child presence detection tests
  - Performance assessment of pressure-retaining curtains
  - New NEV bottom scraping test
  - Virtual tests combining active and passive safety
- Vulnerable Road User (VRU) protection
  - Pedestrian head and leg impact test
  - Automatic Emergency Braking for VRUs
    - New VRU-AEB test scenarios
      - Children and obstacles
      - Crossroads
    - Adjustments to existing scenarios
- Active Safety
  - New scenarios for AEB car-to-car
    - Crossroad
    - Highway rear-end collisions
    - AEB false positive
  - Lane assistance
    - New curve departure warning
    - New Emergency Lane Keeping
    - Adjustments to blind-spot monitoring
  - New tests
    - Door Open Warning
    - Rear Cross Traffic Alert
    - Driver Monitoring System
    - Adaptive Driving Beam

Test	Test speed		
Test	C-NCAP		Euro-NCAP
Test	2024	2021	2023
100% front impact - static solid barrier	55 km/h (34 mph)	50 km/h (31 mph)	
50% front impact - rolling deforming barrier	50 + 50 km/h (31 + 31 mph) @1,400 kg (3,100 lb)		
Side impact rolling deforming barrier	60 km/h (37 mph) @1,700 kg (3,750 lb)	50 km/h (31 mph) @1,400 kg (3,100 lb)	60 km/h (37 mph) @1,400 kg (3,100 lb)
75° side impact rigid pole	32 km/h (20 mph)		
Whiplash	20 km/h (12 mph) @11G peak		Low:16 km/h (9.9 mph) @5G Medium:16 km/h (9.9 mph) @10G High:24 km/h (15 mph) @7.5G

== See also ==
- TNCAP (Taiwan NCAP)
