= Chengdu Auto Show =

Annual auto show in Chengdu, China

Chengdu Auto Show 成都国际汽车展览会
- Genre: Auto Show
- Date: Late August
- Frequency: Annually
- Locations: Chengdu, Sichuan
- Inaugurated: 1997

The Chengdu International Automobile Exhibition Chinese: 成都国际汽车展览会; pinyin: Chéngdū guójì qìchē zhǎnlǎn huì, also known as the Chengdu Auto Show, is a major Auto Show in China. It is held at the Western China Expo City in the city of Chengdu, Sichuan and takes place annually in late August.

The first Chengdu Auto Show was held in 1997. It is one of China's five A-level auto shows, alongside Auto China (Beijing), Auto Shanghai, Auto Guangzhou, and Auto Shenzhen.

== 2023 ==
The 26th edition of the Chengdu Auto show was held from 25 August–3 September 2023.

- BYD Song L EV
- Changan Nevo A07
- Fangchengbao Bao 8 concept
- JAC Refine RF8
- Ji Yue 01
- Kia EV5
- MG4 EV (new name)
- Roewe D7

== 2024 ==
The 27th edition of the Chengdu Auto show was held from 30 August–8 September 2024.

- Avatr 07
- BMW X3 LWB
- BYD Seal 06 GT
- BYD Xia
- Changan CS75 Plus (redesign)
- Chery Fulwin E05
- Deepal L07
- Deepal S05
- Denza Z9
- Luxeed R7
- Neta S GT
- Smart #5
- Volkswagen Passat Pro
- Zeekr 7X

== 2025 ==
The 28th edition of the Chengdu Auto show was held from 29 August–7 September 2025.

- AITO M7 (redesign)
- BYD Seal 07 DM-i (facelift)
- Changan CS55 Plus Facelift
- Chery QQ3 (redesign)
- Deepal L06
- Exeed ET5
- Fangchengbao Ti7
- Ford Bronco New Energy
- Hyptec A800
- SAIC H5
- Smart #5 EHD
- Voyah Passion L
- Wuling Binguo S
- Wuling Starlight 730

== 2026 ==
The 29th edition of the Chengdu Auto show was held from 21–30 August 2026. It featured 58 new cars that either debuted, opened pre-sales, or began deliveries, and featured 120 brands with 1,600 vehicles displayed. The event had 927,800 visitors and customers placed 32,994 orders worth 5.58 billion yuan.

Compared to previous years, around 20 brands were absent from the show, including ultra-luxury marques such as Bentley, Porsche, Rolls-Royce, Lamborghini, Maserati, Aston Martin, Lotus, luxury brands like Lexus, Genesis, and Infiniti, NEV brands such as Tesla, Rox Auto, and Skyworth, and mainstream brands including Dongfeng Nissan, Dongfeng Honda, and Yueda Kia, in addition to Chevrolet which had recently announced its exit from the Chinese market.

- Aeolus L8Y
- Aistaland GX7
- Arcfox αT7
- AUDI E7X Pioneer quattro Passion edition
- Beijing Xingtan 5X
- Bestune Yueyi 08 convertible concept
- BMW i3 L
- BMW iX3 L
- BMW M3 40th Anniversary Limited Edition
- BMW X3 update
- BYD Dahan
- BYD Sealion 08
- BYD Tang
- Cadillac XT5 PHEV
- Changan CS55 Plus Hybrid
- Chery Arrizo 7
- Chery QQ3 Modern edition
- Deepal G318 refresh
- Deepal L06 Special Edition
- Denza Z
- Fangchengbao Formula S
- Fangchengbao Formula S GT
- Fangchengbao Ti9
- Great Wall Cannon trucks
- Haval H10
- Hongqi HS5
- Hyundai Ioniq V
- iCar V25
- IM L6 update
  - IM L6 Jimmy Choo edition
  - IM L6 Sean Lee Special Edition
- Jetour Huanyouzhe
- Jetour Traveller 7
- Jetour Zongheng G700 Moab edition
- Jetta M6
- Luxeed RX
- Lynk & Co 20 facelift
- Maextro V800/V680
- Mazda EZ-60 LiDAR edition
- Mercedes-Benz GLE Long-wheelbase
- MG 07
- M-Hero X700
- Roewe Jiayue 07
- Smart #3 Dynamic Racing Edition
- Smart #5 BRABUS Super Edition
- Stelato G9
- Stelato V8
- Tank 300 refresh
- Volkswagen ID. Aura T6
- Volkswagen ID. Era 5S
- Volkswagen ID. Era 5X
- Volkswagen ID. Era 8X
- Volkswagen ID. Unyx 08 Hunter Package
- Wey V8X
- Xiaomi SkyNomad N70
- Xiaomi SkyNomad N90
- XPeng X9 Black Warrior package
- XPeng G9L Black Gold package
