= Wey Lanshan =

Plug-in hybrid full-size luxury crossover SUV

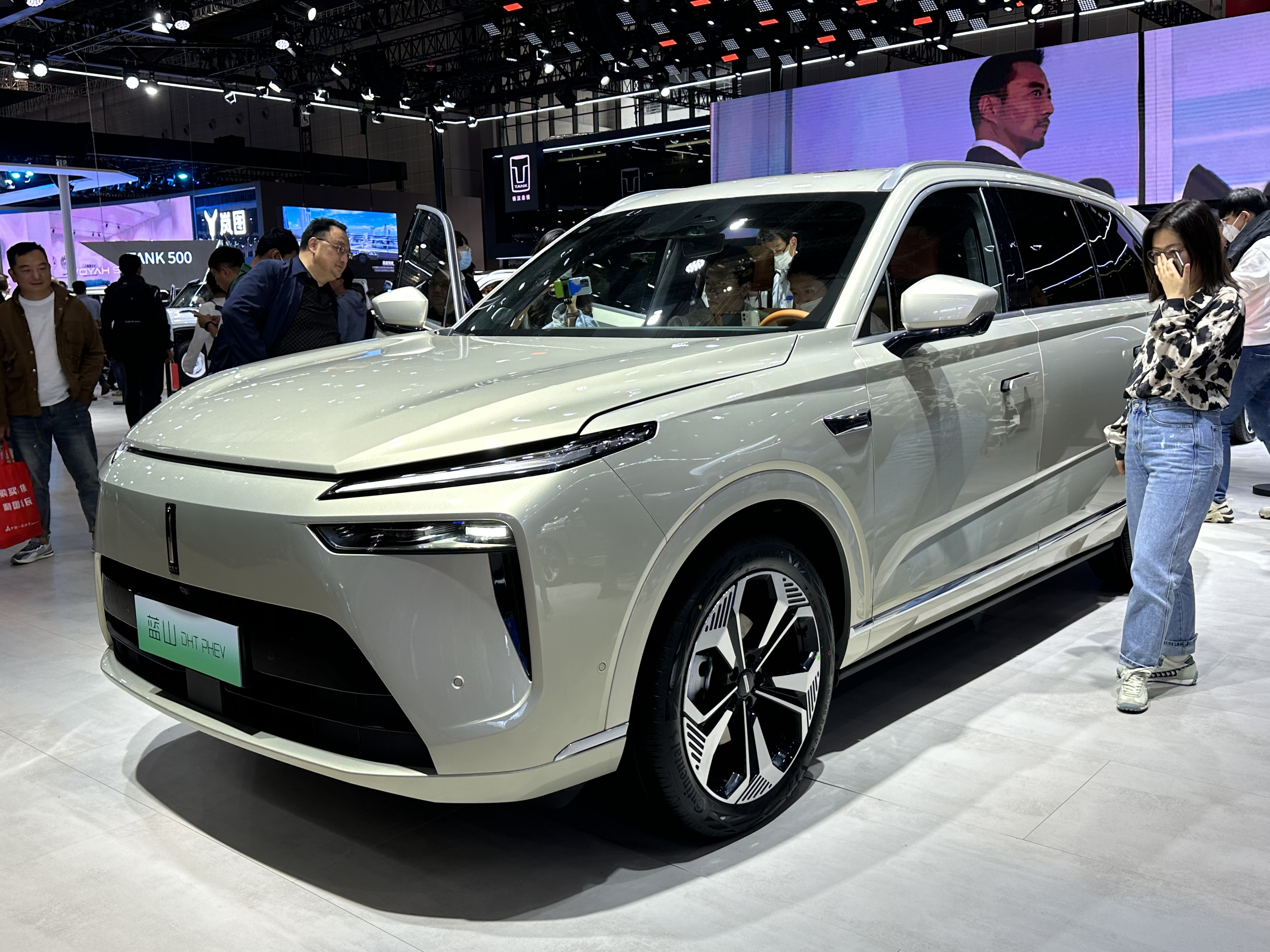

Overview
- Manufacturer: Great Wall Motor
- Production: 2023–present

Body and chassis
- Class: Full-size luxury crossover SUV
- Body style: 5-door SUV

The Wey Lanshan (Chinese: 魏牌蓝山; pinyin: Wèipái Lánshān, blue mountain) is a plug-in hybrid full-size luxury crossover SUV produced by Great Wall Motor under its premium brand Wey.

== First generation (2023) ==
First generation
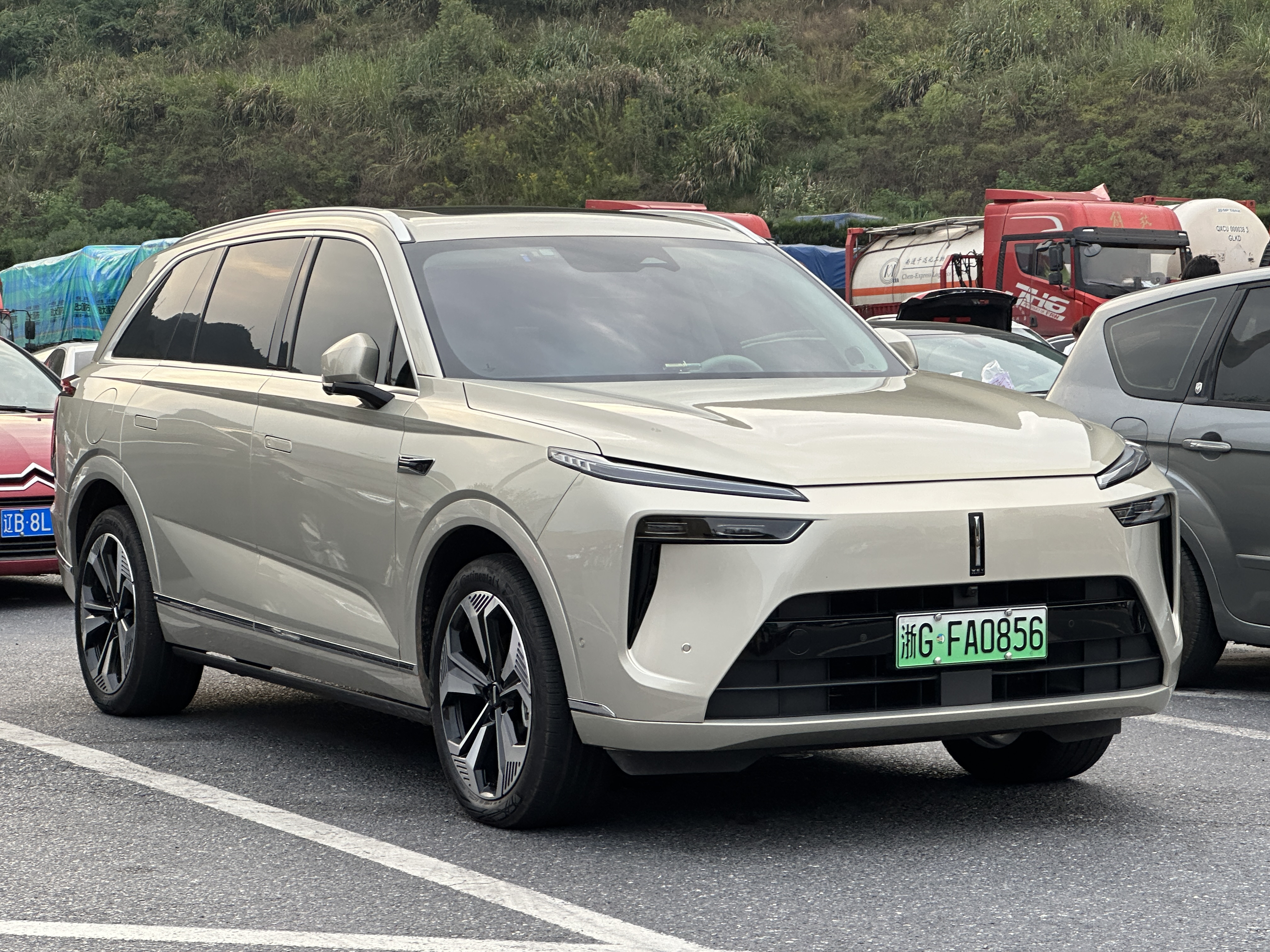

Overview
- Also called: Wey Blue Mountain; Wey 07; GWM Wey 07
- Production: 2023–2026 (China); 2024–present (export)
- Assembly: China: Tianjin

Body and chassis
- Layout: Front-engine, front-wheel-drive or all-wheel-drive

Powertrain
- Engine: Petrol plug-in hybrid: 1.5 L E15BE I4 turbo
- Electric motor: PMSM
- Power output: 510 hp (380 kW; 517 PS)
- Transmission: 2-speed DHT; 4-speed DHT
- Hybrid drivetrain: Series-parallel plug-in hybrid
- Battery: 36.65 kWh NMC CATL; 44.5 kWh NMC CATL/SVOLT; 52.3 kWh NMC CATL
- Range: 1,200–1,343 km (746–835 mi)
- Electric range: 180–220 km (112–137 mi) (WLTP)
- Plug-in charging: DC: 60 kW

Dimensions
- Wheelbase: 3,050 mm (120.1 in)
- Length: 5,156 mm (203.0 in)
- Width: 1,980 mm (78.0 in)
- Height: 1,805 mm (71.1 in)
- Curb weight: 2,395–2,640 kg (5,280–5,820 lb)

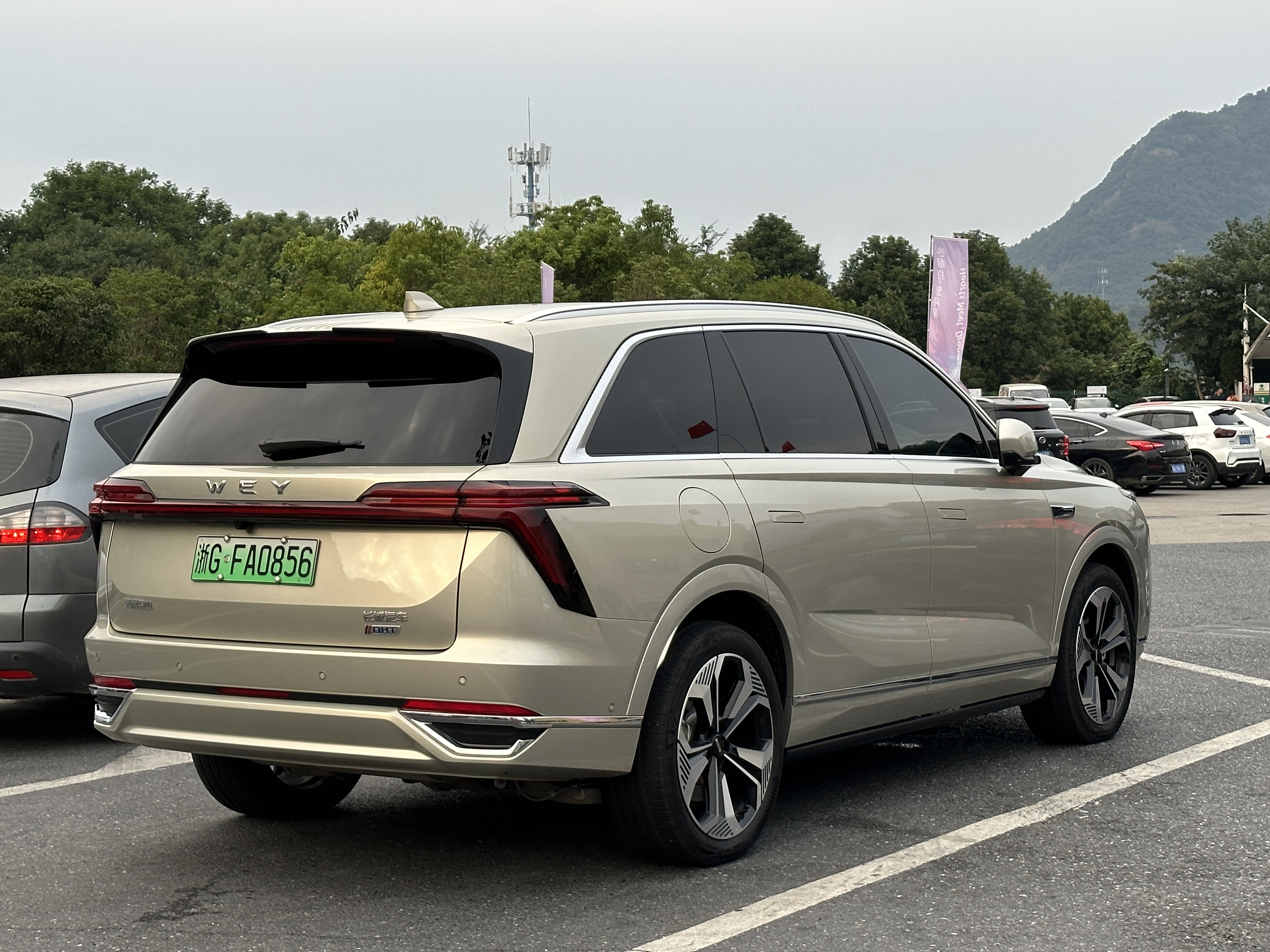
Rear view

The first generation is built on the brand's Coffee Intelligence driving platform. Its dimensions are 5156 mm in length, 1980 mm in width, and 1805 mm in height, with a wheelbase of 3050 mm. The Lanshan is powered by a 1.5-liter turbocharged engine, an electric motor, and a 44.5 kWh NMC battery pack, delivering a combined output of 380 kW (510 hp; 517 PS) and 933 N⋅m (688 lb⋅ft). Its pure electric cruising range is 180 kilometres (112 mi), while its WLTC cruising range exceeds 1,200 kilometres (750 mi).

Specifications
Year	Battery		Engine		Trans.	Motor		System total		Electric range	0–100 km/h (62 mph)	Kerb weight
Year	Type	Weight	Power	Torque	Trans.	Front	Rear	Power	Torque	WLTP	0–100 km/h (62 mph)	Kerb weight
2023–2024	36.65 (35) kWh NMC CATL	223 kg (492 lb)	147 hp (110 kW; 149 PS) at 5,500–6,000 rpm	223 N⋅m (164 lb⋅ft) at 1,500–4,000 rpm	2DHT	130 kW TZ220XS003 PMSM	—	326 hp (243 kW; 331 PS)	523 N⋅m (386 lb⋅ft)	153 km (95 mi)	9.8 s	2,395 kg (5,280 lb)
2023–2024	44.5 (42.5) kWh NMC CATL/SVOLT	260 kg (573 lb)	147 hp (110 kW; 149 PS) at 5,500–6,000 rpm	223 N⋅m (164 lb⋅ft) at 1,500–4,000 rpm	2DHT	130 kW TZ220XS003 PMSM	220 kW TZ220XS000 PMSM	510 hp (380 kW; 517 PS)	933 N⋅m (688 lb⋅ft)	180 km (112 mi)	4.9 s	2,558 kg (5,639 lb)
2024–present	44.5 (42.5) kWh NMC CATL/SVOLT	260 kg (573 lb)	163 hp (122 kW; 165 PS) at 5,500–6,000 rpm	245 N⋅m (181 lb⋅ft) at 1,500–4,000 rpm	4DHT	80 kW TZ220XH007 PMSM	220 kW TZ220XS000 PMSM	526 hp (392 kW; 533 PS)	822 N⋅m (606 lb⋅ft)	185 km (115 mi)	4.9 s	2,590 kg (5,710 lb)
2024–present	52.3 (50) kWh NMC CATL	282.5 kg (623 lb)	163 hp (122 kW; 165 PS) at 5,500–6,000 rpm	245 N⋅m (181 lb⋅ft) at 1,500–4,000 rpm	4DHT	80 kW TZ220XH007 PMSM	220 kW TZ220XS000 PMSM	566 hp (422 kW; 574 PS)	822 N⋅m (606 lb⋅ft)	220 km (137 mi)	4.9 s	2,640 kg (5,820 lb)

== Second generation (2026) ==
Second generation

Overview
- Production: 2026 (to commence)
- Assembly: China: Tianjin

Body and chassis
- Layout: Dual-motor, all-wheel-drive
- Platform: ONE Platform / Guiyuan S
- Related: Haval H10

Powertrain
- Engine: Petrol plug-in hybrid: 2.0 L E20NB I4 turbo
- Electric motor: 110 kW (front); 220 kW (rear)
- Power output: 510 hp (380 kW; 517 PS)
- Transmission: 4-speed Hi4 DHT
- Hybrid drivetrain: Hi4 series-parallel plug-in hybrid
- Battery: 53.6 kWh NMC SVOLT; 64.7 kWh NMC SVOLT
- Electric range: 220–270 km (137–168 mi) (WLTP)

Dimensions
- Wheelbase: 3,010 mm (118.5 in)
- Length: 5,140–5,300 mm (202.4–208.7 in)
- Width: 2,050 mm (80.7 in)
- Height: 1,960 mm (77.2 in)
- Curb weight: 2,640–2,870 kg (5,820–6,327 lb)

In September 2026, the MIIT filings show that a second generation Lanshan based on the same platform of the Haval H10 would be launched and according to the CEO of the Wey brand, the model would be launched in Q4 2026.

Specifications
Battery		Engine	Trans.	Motor		Electric range	Top speed	Kerb weight
Type	Weight	Power	Trans.	Front	Rear	WLTP	Top speed	Kerb weight
53.6 kWh NMC SVOLT	288 kg (635 lb)	238 hp (177 kW; 241 PS)	4DHT	110 kW	220 kW	220 km (137 mi)	205 km/h (127 mph)	2,640 kg (5,820 lb)
53.6 kWh NMC SVOLT	288 kg (635 lb)	238 hp (177 kW; 241 PS)	4DHT	110 kW	220 kW	220 km (137 mi)	205 km/h (127 mph)	2,725 kg (6,008 lb)
64.7 kWh NMC SVOLT	365 kg (805 lb)	238 hp (177 kW; 241 PS)	4DHT	110 kW	220 kW	270 km (168 mi)	210 km/h (130 mph)	2,790 kg (6,151 lb)
64.7 kWh NMC SVOLT	365 kg (805 lb)	238 hp (177 kW; 241 PS)	4DHT	110 kW	220 kW	270 km (168 mi)	210 km/h (130 mph)	2,870 kg (6,327 lb)

== Sales ==
Year	China	Brazil
2023	23,486	
2024	42,499	
2025	35,899	579
