= Stelato G9 =

Full-size luxury SUV

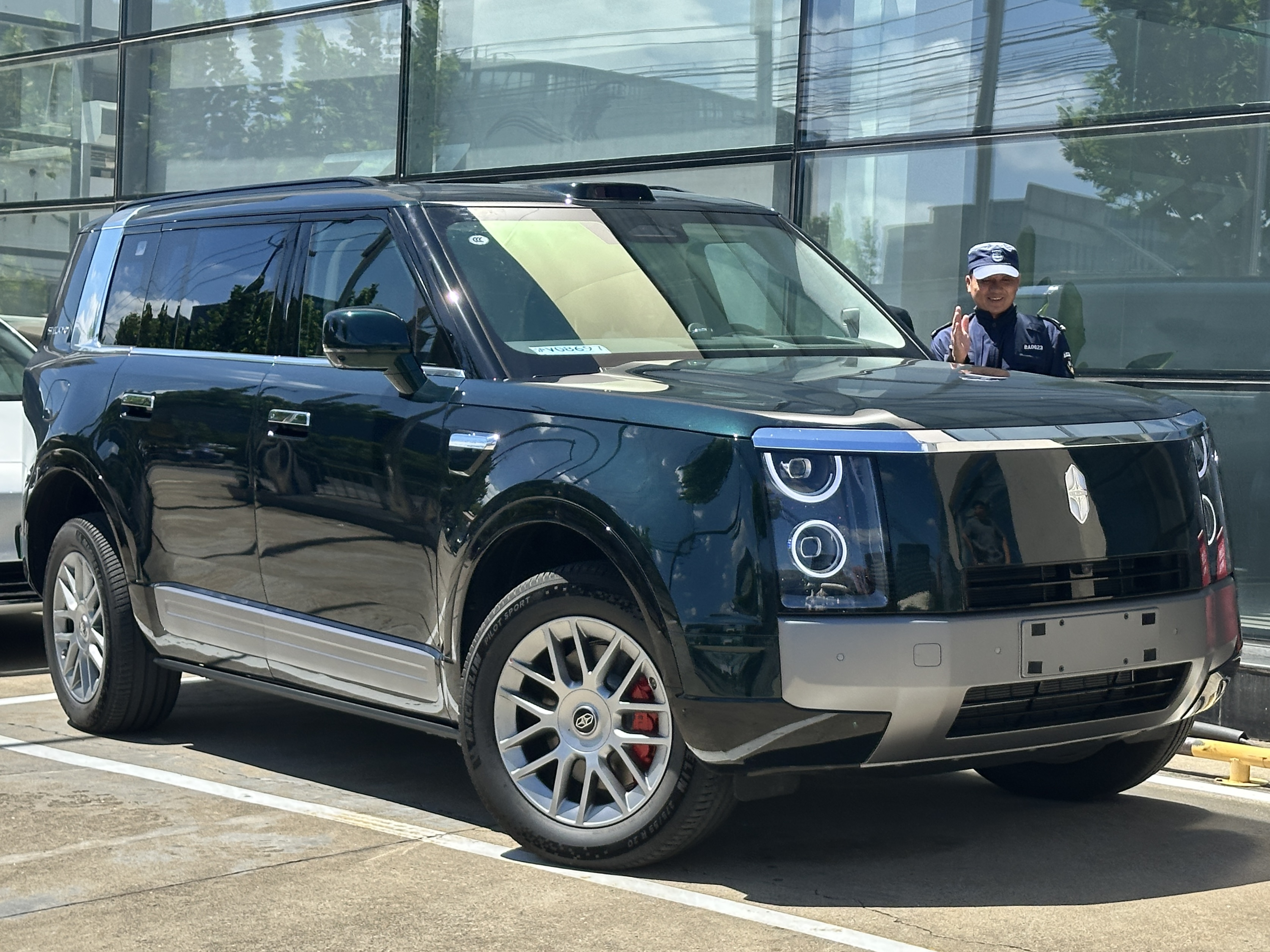

Overview
- Manufacturer: Stelato (BAIC BluePark)
- Production: 2026–present
- Assembly: China: Beijing (BJEV Stelato plant)

Body and chassis
- Class: Full-size luxury SUV (F)
- Body style: 5-door SUV
- Layout: Battery electric: Dual-motor, all-wheel-drive; Range-extended EV: Front-engine, dual-motor, all-wheel-drive
- Platform: All-Terrain Tuling platform
- Chassis: Unibody

Powertrain
- Engine: Gasoline range extender: 1.5 L S15T0PH turbo I4
- Electric motor: Huawei YS210XYC54 induction motor (front); Huawei YY67-TZ210A05 PMSM (rear)
- Power output: 586 hp (437 kW; 594 PS)
- Hybrid drivetrain: Series (EREV)
- Battery: Range-extended EV: 56 kWh CATL Freevoy LFP; 75 kWh CATL Freevoy NMC; Battery electric: 120 kWh CATL Qilin NMC
- Range: At least 1,300 km (808 mi) (EREV)
- Electric range: 728 km (452 mi) (EV, CLTC); 220–312 km (137–194 mi) (EREV, WLTP)

Dimensions
- Wheelbase: 3,160 mm (124.4 in)
- Length: 5,206–5,377 mm (205.0–211.7 in)
- Width: 2,050 mm (80.7 in)
- Height: 1,897 mm (74.7 in)

The Stelato G9 (Chinese: 享界G9; pinyin: Xiǎngjiè G9) is a battery electric and range-extended full-size luxury SUV produced by BAIC BluePark and sold under the Stelato brand created in partnership with Huawei that is part of the Harmony Intelligent Mobility Alliance.

== Overview ==
The Stelato G9 is the first SUV of the Stelato brand and the first off-road vehicle of both Stelato and all HIMA brands. It will be offered in both 5-seat (2-3) and 6-seat (2-2-2) configurations and is part of the "9 Series" of HIMA's flagship vehicles. Stelato introduced the G9 alongside the increasing popularity of hardcore off-road SUVs in China.

=== Design ===
The front of the G9 uses round daytime running lights with the main headlights using a halved design and the autonomous driving indicator lights using a fully round design. The Stelato logo at the center of the front end is illuminated. A large piece of chrome trim is utilized at the sides, possibly representing the boxy, upright design. There are semi-hidden door handles on the sides, utilizing a star pattern similar to the Maextro S800.

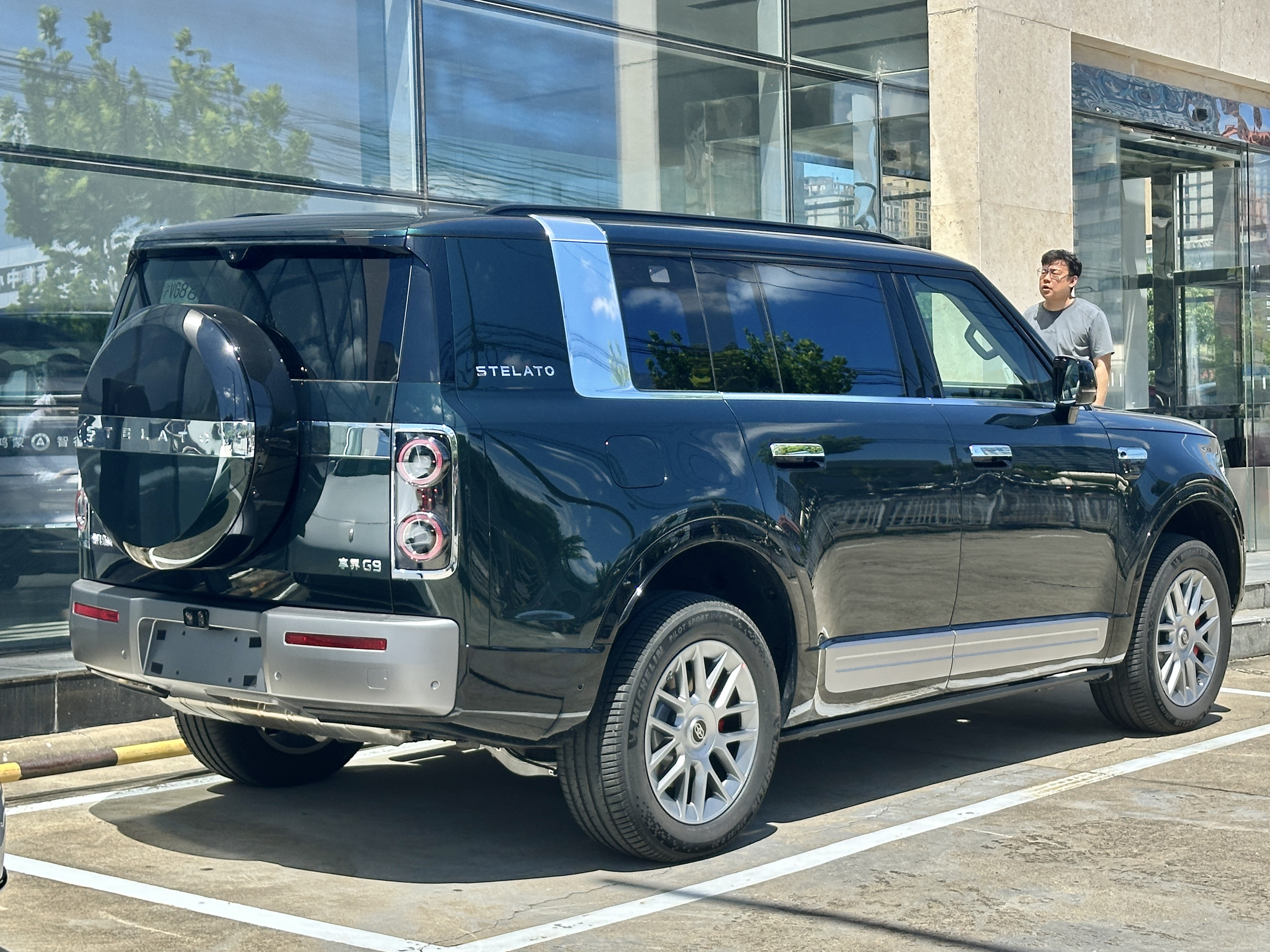
Rear view

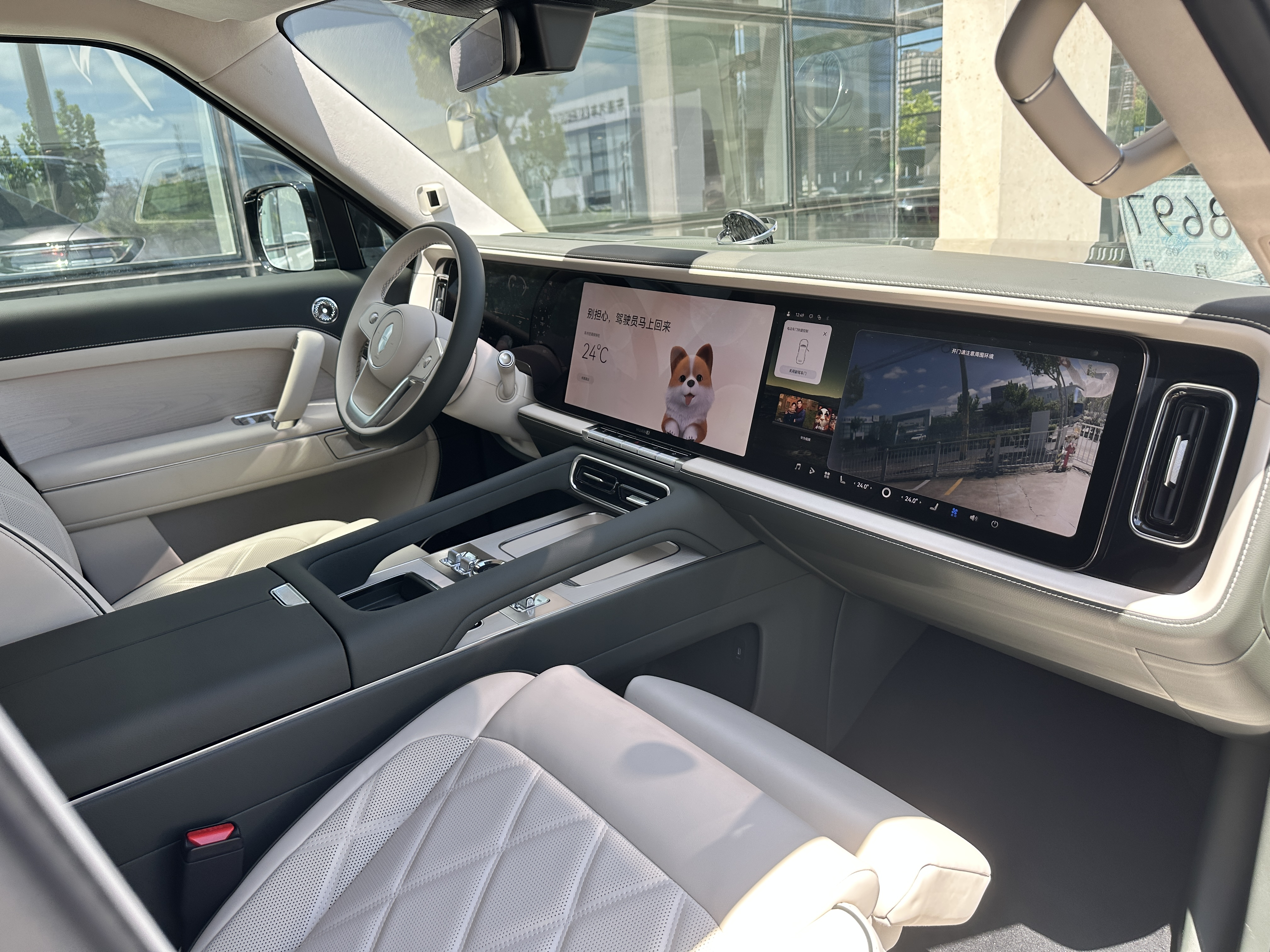
Interior

=== Features ===
The interior of the G9 uses three screens: An LCD instrument cluster, a main touchscreen, and a separate touchscreen for the copilot. The HarmonyOS Cockpit is utilized for all screens. A wireless phone charger is utilized and is located on the center console. It will also be equipped with Huawei's ADS 5.0 advanced driver-assistance system and its Qiankun 896-channel LiDAR sensor. The G9's headlights are officially known as "HarmonyOS Star Lights", and it also has optional electric running boards, tow hooks, and roof racks available. The front seats have active seat bolsters, and the windows have a dimming function. The 6-seater has a 370-litre (13.1 cu ft) rear cargo which expands to 1,198 L (42.3 cu ft) with the seats folded down, while the 5-seater has 978 L (34.5 cu ft) and 2,058 L (72.7 cu ft) with the seats folded down.

== History ==
The Stelato G9 was first unveiled in filings released by the Ministry of Industry and Information Technology on June 10, 2026 as HIMA's first off-road product. Official images were posted on Stelato's Weibo account on June 15, 2026.

On June 16, 2026, a camouflaged G9 prototype was photographed on a highway in Beijing testing its autonomous driving systems, as evidenced by all 6 of its blue autonomous driving light indicators being lit up. The first fully undisguised G9 was photographed on June 29, 2026, with its interior also unveiled in the process.

On July 14, 2026, the Stelato had confirmed that the G9 obtained a Level 3 autonomous driving license for Beijing, becoming the first car in the city to be able to operate autonomously and continuously up to 74.5 mph (120 km/h) on highways in both daytime and nighttime.

On August 5, 2026, the G9 opened for pre-orders at the launch event for the Maextro V800/V680 and Huawei's all-scenario new products, with a starting pre-sale price of 439,800 yuan.

The G9 launched on August 20, 2026, and went on sale the same day with a starting price of ¥429,800 ($63,916) and 10 variants being available.

== Powertrain and chassis ==
The battery electric version of the G9 is built on an 800-voltage architecture and uses motors provided by Huawei itself. The front motor produces 215 horsepower (160 kW; 218 PS) while the rear motor produces 371 horsepower (277 kW; 376 PS). All battery electric models will use CATL and Huawei's Jujing (Giant Whale) NMC battery with a capacity of 120 kWh providing a CLTC range rating of 728 kilometres (452 mi). The range-extended G9 uses the same motors, but adds a 1.5-liter turbocharged inline 4 gasoline engine codenamed S15T0PH producing 158 horsepower (118 kW; 160 PS), with (154 horsepower (115 kW; 156 PS) being usable, as a generator. Range-extended models come with either a 56 kWh LFP or 75.4 kWh NMC battery pack, providing WLTP electric range ratings of up to 238 and 312 kilometres (148 and 194 mi), respectively.

The G9 uses front double-wishbone suspension and a rear 5-link independent axle. Air suspension comes standard and it has 12 degrees of rear-wheel steering, allowing for a turning radius of 5.2 m (17.1 ft). It is built with a unibody structure. It has a ground clearance of 205 mm (8.1 in) and approach and departure angles of 23.5° and 26°, respectively. It has an 800-volt active anti-roll bar system which is capable of disconnecting, and it has active dog clutch differential locks. It has a drag coefficient of 0.279C_{d}.

Specifications
Battery		Motor		Power	Electric range		Top speed	Kerb weight
Type	Weight	Front	Rear	Power	WLTP	CLTC	Top speed	Kerb weight
56 kWh LFP CATL	406 kg (895 lb)	160 kW YS210XYC54 induction	277 kW YY67-TZ210A05 PMSM	586 hp (437 kW; 594 PS)	220–238 km (137–148 mi)		220 km/h (137 mph)	2,949–2,984 kg (6,501–6,579 lb)
75.4 kWh NMC CATL	416 kg (917 lb)	160 kW YS210XYC54 induction	277 kW YY67-TZ210A05 PMSM	586 hp (437 kW; 594 PS)	285–312 km (177–194 mi)	405 km (252 mi)	220 km/h (137 mph)	2,978–3,062 kg (6,565–6,751 lb)
120 kWh NMC CATL	628 kg (1,385 lb)	160 kW YS210XYA03 induction	277 kW YY67-TZ210A05 PMSM	586 hp (437 kW; 594 PS)		728 km (452 mi)	220 km/h (137 mph)	2,848–2,944 kg (6,279–6,490 lb)

== Sales ==
Within 72 hours of pre-sales opening on August 5, 2026, the G9 received over 15,000 pre-orders. Within 24 hours of orders opening on August 22, 2026, at the Chengdu Auto Show, the G9 received 5,000 non-refundable locked-in orders, of which 95% were for the Ultra or Ultra+ variants.
