= Haval H10 =

Plug-in hybrid full-size SUV

Overview
- Manufacturer: Great Wall Motor
- Production: 2026–present
- Assembly: China: Tianjin

Body and chassis
- Class: Full-size SUV
- Body style: 5-door SUV
- Platform: ONE platform / Guiyuan S
- Related: Wey Lanshan (second generation)

Powertrain
- Engine: Petrol plug-in hybrid: 1.5 L GW4B15E turbo I4
- Electric motor: TZ220XH009 PMSM (front); QT35TZ220001 PMSM (rear)
- Transmission: 4-speed DHT
- Battery: 42.8 kWh LFP SVOLT
- Electric range: 176–180 km (109–112 mi) (WLTP); 227–232 km (141–144 mi) (CLTC)
- Plug-in charging: DC: 30–80% in 15 minutes

Dimensions
- Wheelbase: 3,000 mm (118.1 in)
- Length: 5,138–5,299 mm (202.3–208.6 in)
- Width: 2,050 mm (80.7 in)
- Height: 1,970 mm (77.6 in)
- Curb weight: 2,510–2,570 kg (5,534–5,666 lb)

Chronology
- Predecessor: Haval H9

The Haval H10 (Chinese: 长城H10) is a plug-in hybrid full-size SUV manufactured by Great Wall Motor under the Haval brand. Deliveries of the vehicle began at the 2026 Chengdu Auto Show on 20 August 2026.

== Overview ==
The H10 is classified as a mid-to-large SUV in the Chinese car market, and is available as either a 5-seater or 6-seater.

The interior features a 10.25-inch digital instrument panel supplemented with a 29-inch heads-up display, along with a 15.6-inch 2.5K-resolution central infotainment touchscreen. The rear passengers have access to a ceiling-mounted 17.3-inch 3K-resolution entertainment display.

Rear view

Interior

== Powertrain ==
The H10 is available solely with a plug-in hybrid at launch, marketed as Hi4. It uses a 1.5-liter turbocharger inline-4 petrol engine which outputs 161 hp (120 kW; 163 PS) (165 hp (123 kW; 167 PS) gross power) and 243 N⋅m (179 lb⋅ft) of torque, paired with a 4-speed dedicated hybrid transmission. It is equipped with a 134 hp (100 kW; 136 PS) front motor and a 295 hp (220 kW; 299 PS) rear motor, and total system output with the engine reaches 590 hp (440 kW; 598 PS) and 722 N⋅m (533 lb⋅ft) of torque. It can achieve 0–100 km/h (62 mph) in 4.9 seconds and has a top speed of 190 km/h (118 mph).

The hybrid system is powered by a 42.8 kWh LFP battery supplied by GWM-spinoff SVOLT, which provides up to 180 kilometres (112 mi) of WLTP electric range. It can be recharged from 30–80% in 15 minutes at a DC fast charging station.

== Sales ==
After pre-sales opened on , the H10 received 22,615 pre-orders within 12 hours and 31,826 pre-orders within 24 hours.
