= Jetour TX =

Compact crossover SUV

Overview
- Manufacturer: Jetour
- Also called: Jetour Huanyouzhe
- Production: 2026 (to commence)
- Assembly: China: Fuzhou, Fujian

Body and chassis
- Class: Compact crossover SUV
- Body style: 5-door SUV
- Layout: Rear-motor, rear-wheel drive; Dual-motor, all-wheel drive

Powertrain
- Electric motor: 75 kW YS180XS080 induction (front); 200 kW TZ18XYA1 PMSM (rear)
- Battery: 67.2 kWh LFP Deyi
- Electric range: 510–550 km (317–342 mi) (CLTC)

Dimensions
- Wheelbase: 2,735 mm (107.7 in)
- Length: 4,475 mm (176.2 in)
- Width: 1,880 mm (74.0 in)
- Height: 1,700–1,710 mm (66.9–67.3 in)
- Curb weight: 1,777–1,875 kg (3,918–4,134 lb)

The Jetour TX, known as the Jetour Huanyouzhe (Chinese: 捷途环游者; pinyin: Jiétú huányóuzhě; lit. 'Jetour Circumnavigator') in the Chinese market, is a compact crossover SUV manufactured by Jetour. It is Jetour's first model to be exclusively offered only with a battery electric powertrain.

== Overview ==
The TX was first shown publicly at the 2026 Beijing Auto Show as an exterior-only display model. Some technical details were showcased at the Jetour Box conference on 26 June 2026, and in the 410th batch of MIIT regulatory filings on 7 August 2026, before the vehicle debuted at the 2026 Chengdu Auto Show on 21 August where blind pre-orders opened. It is expected to launch in Q4 of 2026.

The TX uses a new design language for Jetour featuring a double ring motif within a spanning black panel for both the front headlights and DRLs and taillights. The exterior has a drag coefficient of 0.32 C_{d}. It features a 150-litre (5.3 cu ft) frunk.

The interior features a digital instrument cluster and central infotainment touchscreen running Tour OS 3.5 and is powered by a Qualcomm Snapdragon 8775 SoC. The center console features a row of physical controls, a pair of wireless charging pads of which one is active-cooled, and a drive mode selector dial. The seats have heating and ventilation functions, and the passenger seat has an extending legrest. The interior is upholstered in synthetic leather and features bronze metallic trim elements.

It features Chery Falcon 500 ADAS system with a sensor suite consisting of 3 mmWave radars, 7 cameras, and 12 ultrasonic sensors and is powered by a Qualcomm Snapdragon 8775 chip outputting 144 TOPS, is capable of Level 2 supervised autonomous driving in highway conditions.

== Powertrain ==
The TX is available exclusively with battery electric powertrains.

All variants are equipped with a permanent magnet synchronous motor outputting 268 hp (200 kW; 272 PS) driving the rear axle. All-wheel drive variants add an induction motor outputting 100 hp (75 kW; 101 PS) to the front axle, for a total of 369 hp (275 kW; 374 PS).

The TX uses a 67.2 kWh (65.4 kWh usable) LFP battery pack supplied by Chery-backed Anhui Deyi which provides CLTC range ratings of 550 and 510 kilometres (342 and 317 mi) for rear- and all-wheel drive, respectively.

Specifications
| Battery | | Motor | | Power | Torque | Range | 30–80% charge | 0–180 km/h (112 mph) | Top speed | Kerb weight |
| Type | Weight | Front | Rear | Power | Torque | CLTC | 30–80% charge | 0–180 km/h (112 mph) | Top speed | Kerb weight |
|---|---|---|---|---|---|---|---|---|---|---|
| 67.2 (65.4) kWh LFP Deyi | 476 kg (1,049 lb) | — | 200 kW (70 kW rated) TZ18XYA1 PMSM | 268 hp (200 kW; 272 PS) | 285 N⋅m (210 lb⋅ft) | 550 km (342 mi) | 20 min | 7.5 s | 180 km/h (112 mph) | 1,777 kg (3,918 lb) |
| 67.2 (65.4) kWh LFP Deyi | 476 kg (1,049 lb) | 75 kW (14 kW rated) YS180XS080 induction | 200 kW (70 kW rated) TZ18XYA1 PMSM | 369 hp (275 kW; 374 PS) | 427 N⋅m (315 lb⋅ft) | 510 km (317 mi) | 20 min | 5.5 s | 180 km/h (112 mph) | 1,875 kg (4,134 lb) |
