= JAC Refine RF8 =

Large MPV

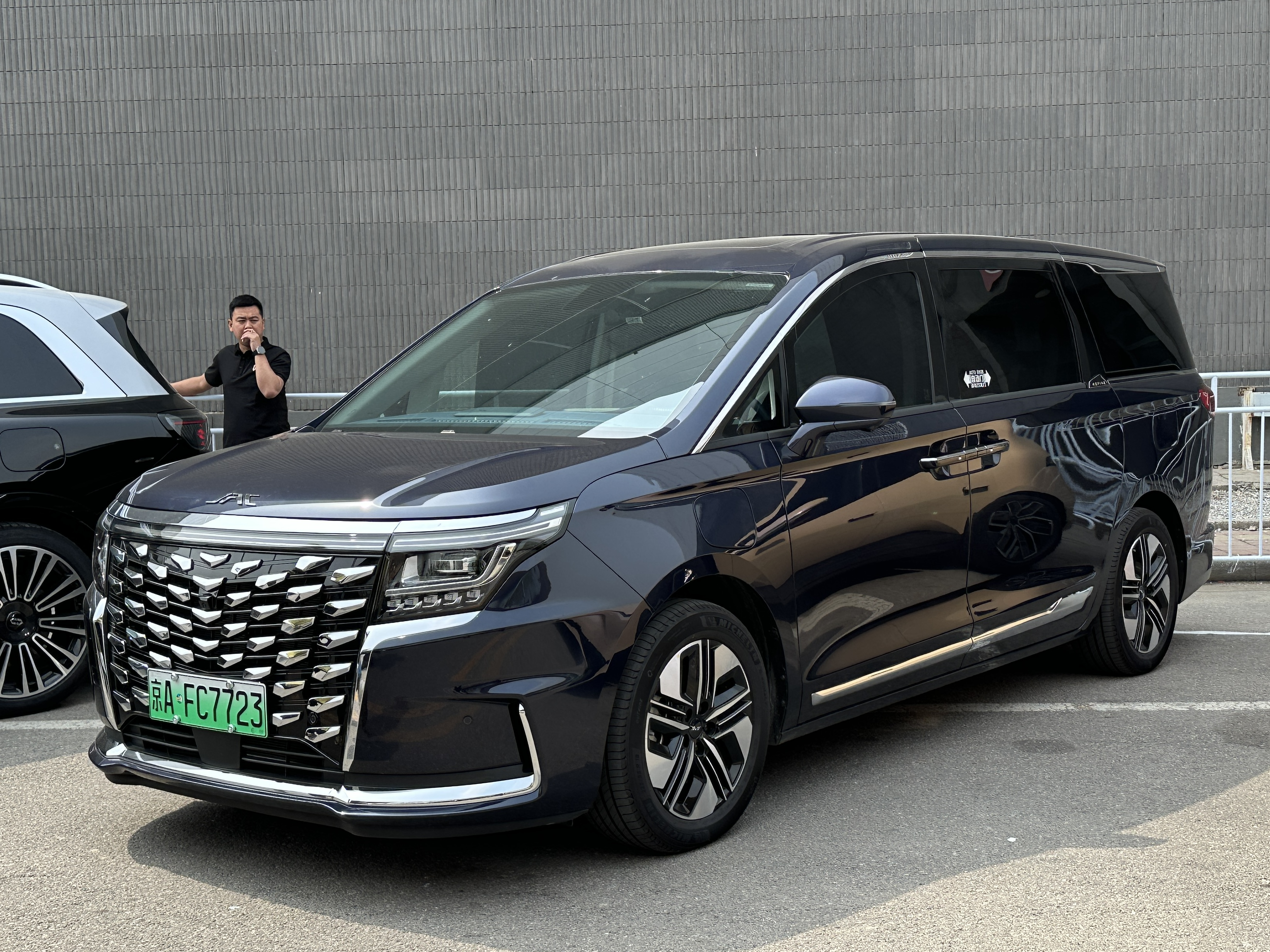

Overview
- Manufacturer: JAC Group
- Also called: JAC RF8 (export); JAC Traveler (export); Sollers SP7 (Russia)
- Production: January 2024 – present
- Assembly: China: Hefei

Body and chassis
- Class: Large MPV (M)
- Body style: 5-door minivan
- Layout: Front-motor, front-wheel-drive
- Platform: MUSE platform

Powertrain
- Engine: Petrol: 2.0 L N20TG turbo I4; Petrol plug-in hybrid: 1.5 L BHE15-BFZ turbo I4
- Electric motor: 160 kW permanent magnet synchronous (PHEV)
- Battery: 27.6 kWh LFP (PHEV); 44.5 kWh LFP (PHEV)

Dimensions
- Wheelbase: 3,100 mm (122.0 in)
- Length: 5,215 mm (205.3 in)
- Width: 1,895 mm (74.6 in)
- Height: 1,830 mm (72.0 in)
- Curb weight: 2,220–2,330 kg (4,894–5,137 lb)

The JAC Refine RF8 is a large MPV produced by JAC Group that was unveiled in August 2023, and has been produced since 2024. It is the first standalone model to be sold under the JAC Refine series.

== Overview ==
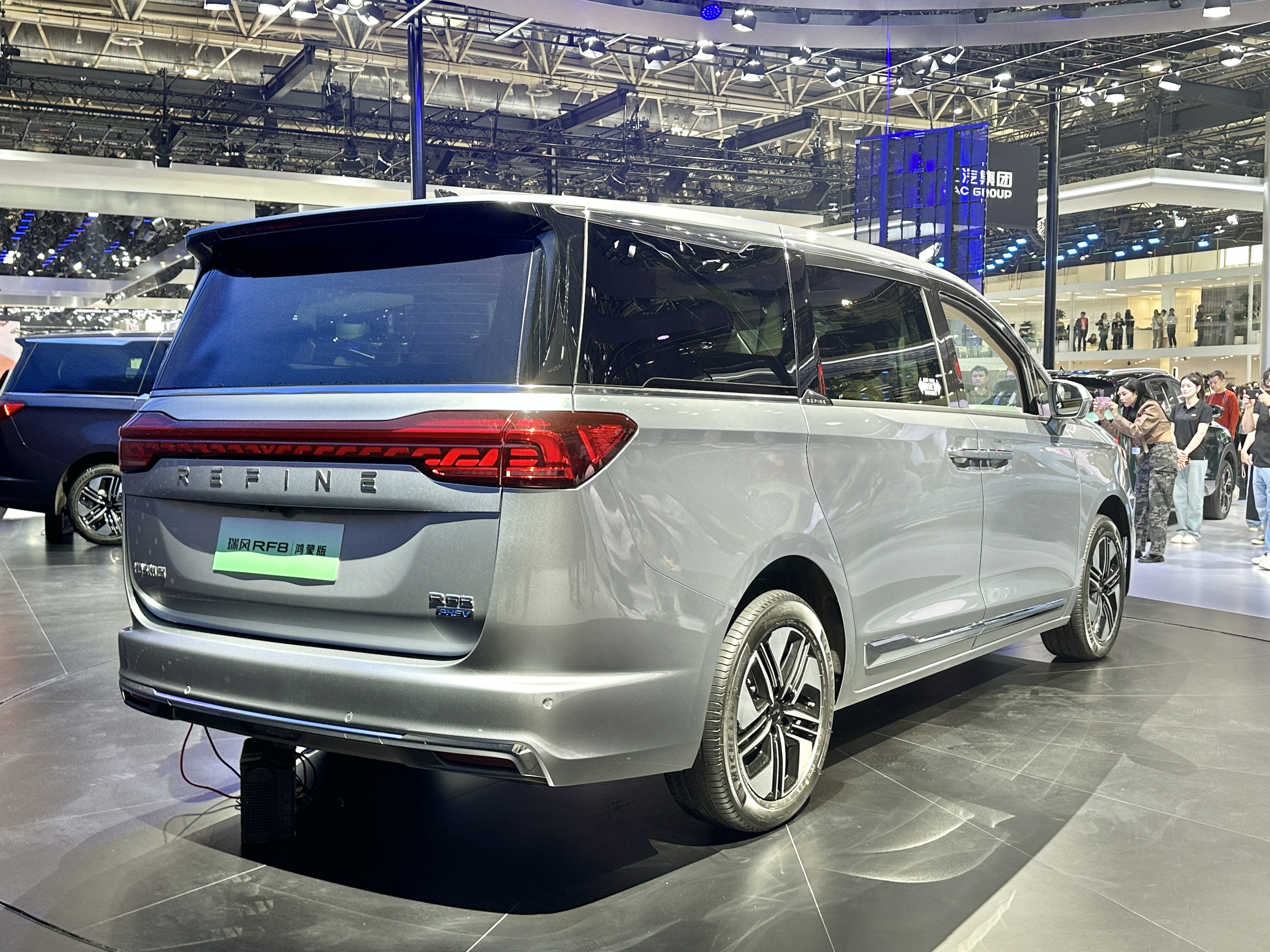
Rear view

The Refine RF8 was presented in August 2023 at the Chengdu Auto Show. The first model was built on the MUSE platform, the company plans two more minivan models on this platform in 2025 and 2026.

In January 2024 it was initially went on sale with a 2.0 litre turbo pure combustion engine on the Chinese market. A 1.5 turbo plug-in hybrid version followed three months later.

== Specifications ==
The combustion engine version uses a 2.0 liter gasoline engine with 186 kW (253 hp). The plug-in hybrid uses a 1.5-liter gasoline engine with 120 kW (163 hp) and two 160 kW (218 hp) electric motors. The system output is 310 kW (421 HP), the electric range is stated as 116 km (27.6 kWh battery) or 205 km (44.5 kWh battery) according to CLTC.

== Sales ==
Year	China
2024	2,026
