= Changan Nevo A07 =

Executive sedan

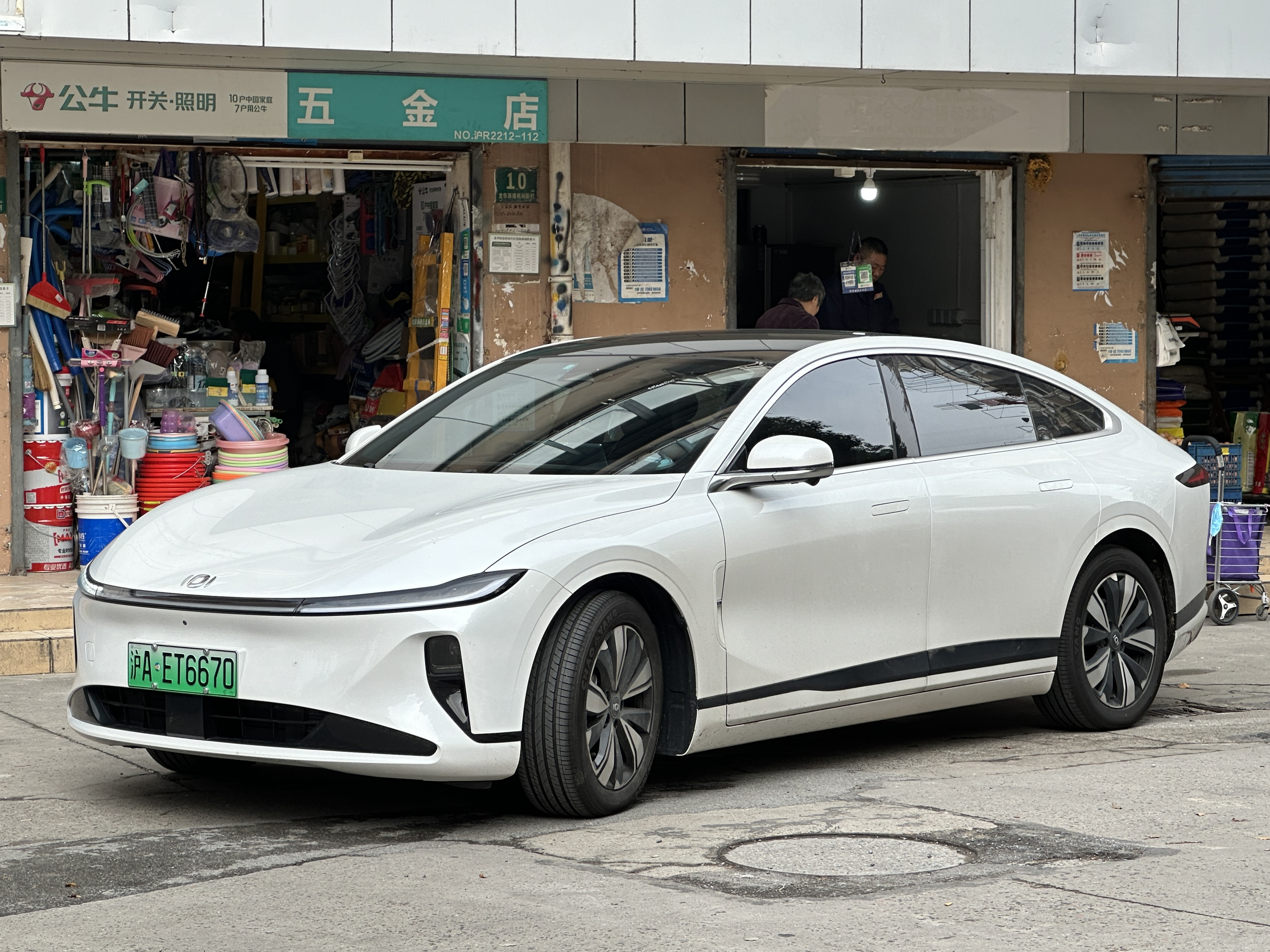

Overview
- Manufacturer: Changan (Nevo)
- Model code: C236
- Production: 2023–present
- Assembly: China: Nanchang

Body and chassis
- Class: Executive car (E)
- Body style: 4-door sedan
- Layout: Rear-motor, rear-wheel-drive (EV); Front-engine, rear-motor, rear-wheel-drive (EREV)
- Platform: Changan EPA1 platform
- Related: Deepal SL03/L07; Mazda EZ-6/6e

Dimensions
- Wheelbase: 2,900 mm (114.2 in)
- Length: 4,905 mm (193.1 in)
- Width: 1,910 mm (75.2 in)
- Height: 1,480 mm (58.3 in)
- Curb weight: 1,865–1,900 kg (4,112–4,189 lb)

The Changan Nevo A07 (Chinese: 长安启源A07) is a battery electric and range extender executive sedan produced by Chinese auto manufacturer Changan under the Changan Nevo brand.

== Overview ==
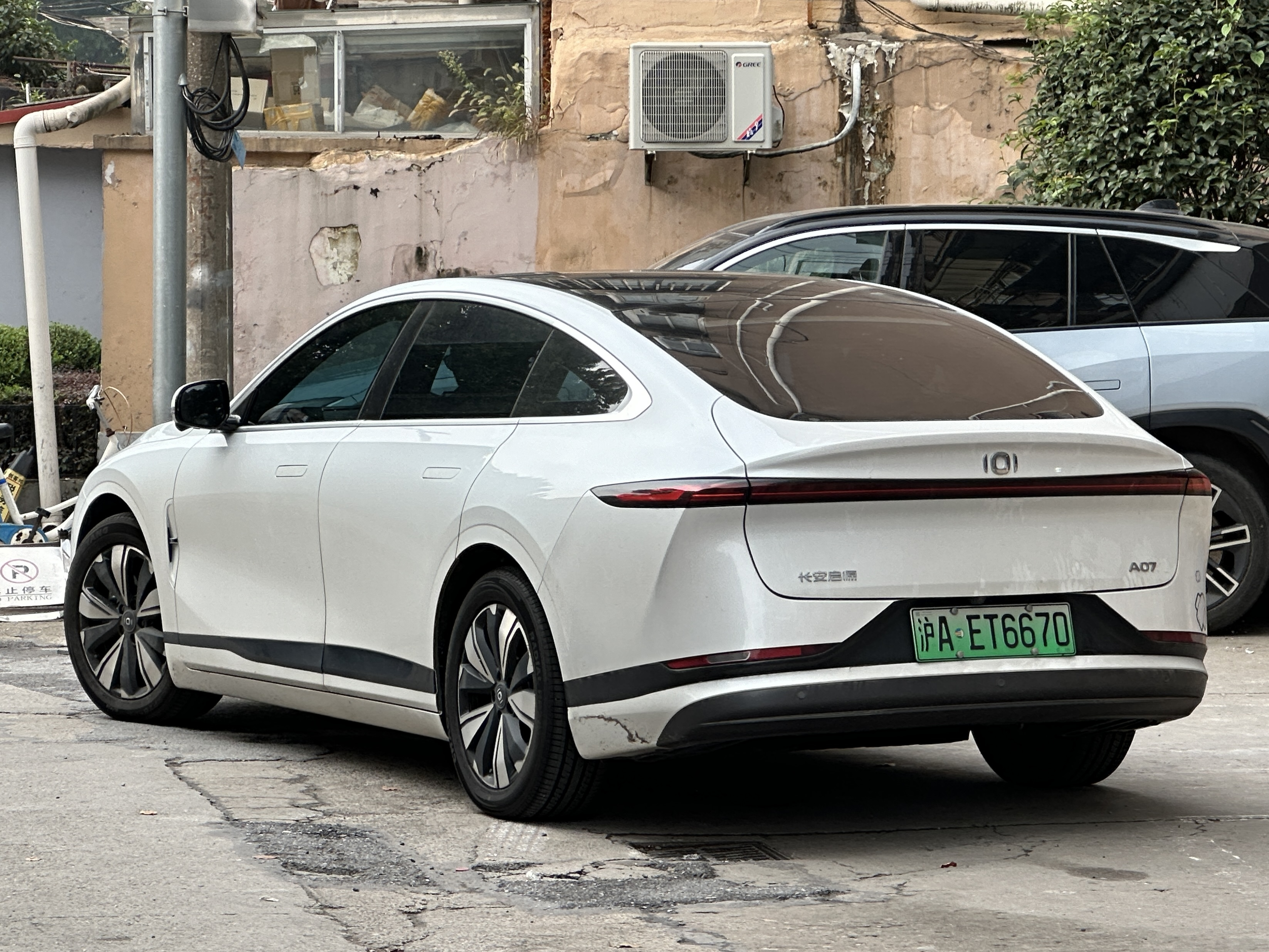
Rear view

The Changan Nevo A07 debuted in mid-2023 as the first model of the newly established Changan Nevo brand expanding the Changan portfolio in the field of electrified cars. The higher-class, 4.9-meter sedan was built on the EPA1 platform shared, among others, with the Deepal SL03, distinguished by a futuristic styling dominated by narrow light strips at the front and rear and a gently sloping roofline in the fastback style.

The passenger cabin has a digital-minimalist aesthetic with a large share of contrasting colors, distinguished by a two-spoke steering wheel and a large, central 15.4-inch touch screen that allows you to control not only the multimedia system, but also the air conditioning and speedometer and on-board computer readings. In front of the driver there is a HUD.

== Specifications ==
The main drive variant of the Changan Nevo A07 is the electric version, which transmits power to both axles through two electric motors outputting 218 hp (163 kW; 221 PS) and 258 hp (192 kW; 262 PS), respectively. There are two battery packs to choose from: 58 kWh giving 515 kilometres (320 mi) of range on the CLTC cycle, or 80 kWh giving approximately 710 kilometres (440 mi) of range in the CLTC standard. In addition, an extended-range variant with a 1.5-liter combustion engine is also available for sale, which allows for extended range in mixed mode.

== Sales ==
| Year | China | | | Total production | | |
| Year | EV | EREV | Total | EV | EREV | Total |
|---|---|---|---|---|---|---|
| 2023 | 914 | 8,864 | 9,778 | 1,454 | 13,724 | 15,178 |
| 2024 | 36,547 | 18,187 | 54,734 | 45,461 | 15,018 | 60,479 |
| 2025 | 39,634 | 11,401 | 51,035 | 38,305 | 12,171 | 50,476 |
