= Avatr 07 =

Electric mid-size crossover SUV

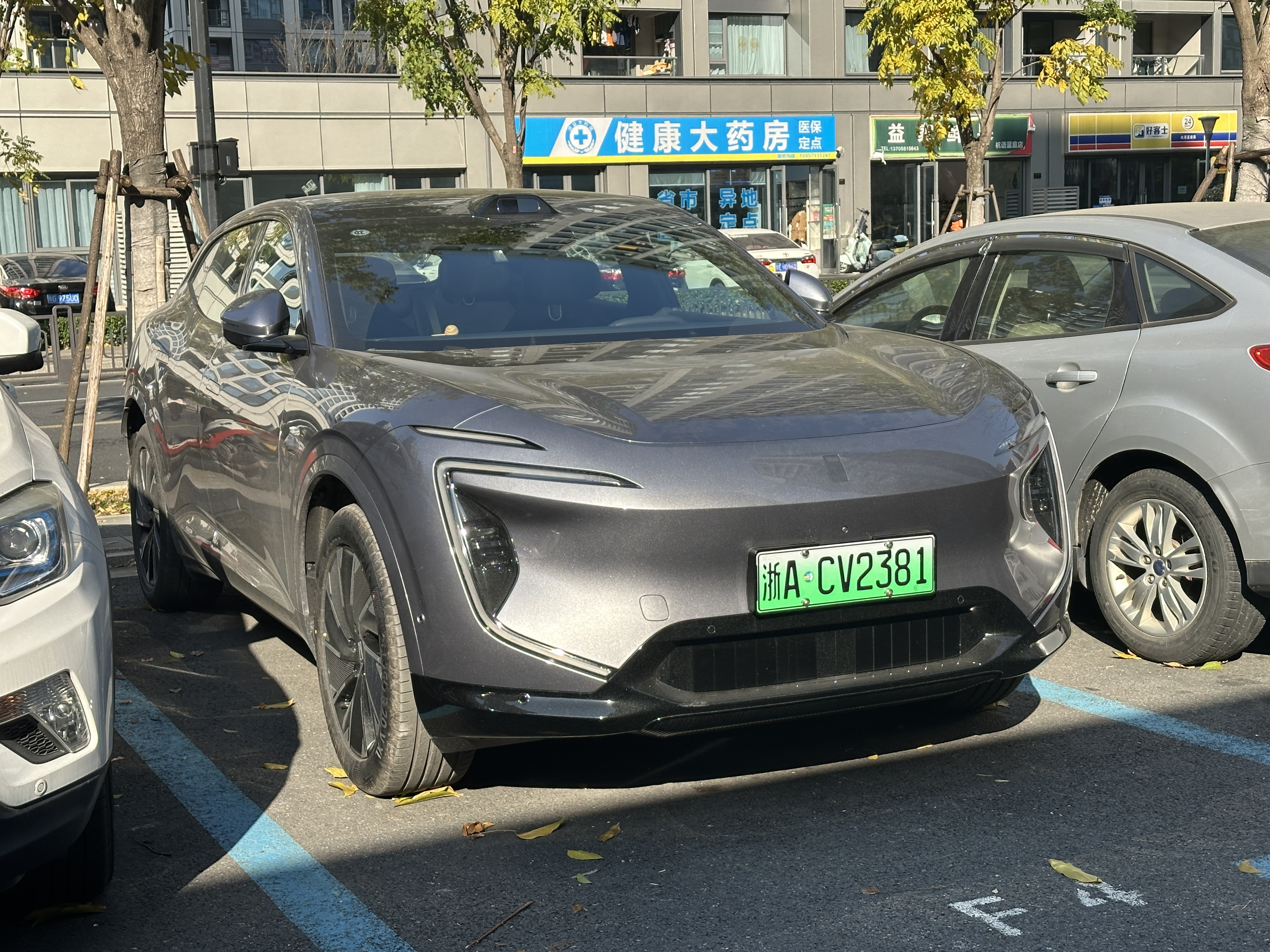

Overview
- Manufacturer: Avatr Technology
- Model code: E15
- Production: 2024–present
- Assembly: China: Chongqing
- Designer: Nader Faghihzadeh; Nicolas Guille

Body and chassis
- Class: Mid-size crossover SUV
- Body style: 5-door SUV
- Layout: Rear-motor, rear-wheel drive; Dual-motor, all-wheel-drive; Front-engine, rear-motor, rear-wheel-drive; Front-engine, dual-motor, all-wheel-drive
- Platform: CHN platform
- Related: Avatr 06

Powertrain
- Engine: Petrol range extender: 1.5 L JL469ZQ1 I4 turbo
- Electric motor: XTDM39 252 kW permanent magnet synchronous (rear, EV); XYDM05 188 kW induction AC (front, EV); ATDM01 231 kW permanent magnet synchronous (rear, EREV); 131 kW induction AC (front, EREV)
- Power output: 231–440 kW (310–590 hp; 314–598 PS)
- Transmission: Single-speed gear reduction
- Battery: 39.05 kWh Freevoy LFP-Na-ion hybrid CATL; 82.16 kWh Shenxing LFP CATL
- Range: 1,100 km (680 mi) (CLTC)
- Electric range: 220–230 km (137–143 mi) (EREV, CLTC); 610–650 km (379–404 mi) (EV, CLTC)

Dimensions
- Wheelbase: 2,940 mm (116 in); 2,990 mm (118 in) (07L)
- Length: 4,825 mm (190 in); 4,910 mm (193 in) (07L)
- Width: 1,980 mm (78 in)
- Height: 1,605–1,620 mm (63–64 in); 1,650–1,670 mm (65–66 in) (07L)
- Curb weight: 2,240–2,434 kg (4,938–5,366 lb)

The Avatr 07 (Chinese: 阿维塔07; pinyin: Ā wéi tǎ 07) is a battery electric and extended range mid-size crossover SUV produced by Avatr Technology, a joint venture between Changan Automobile and lithium-ion battery provider CATL. It is the third vehicle under the Avatr brand. It is the first vehicle to feature Avatr's Kunlun range extender system, which utilizes the first ever implementation of hybrid chemistry versions of CATL's Freevoy batteries.

== Overview ==
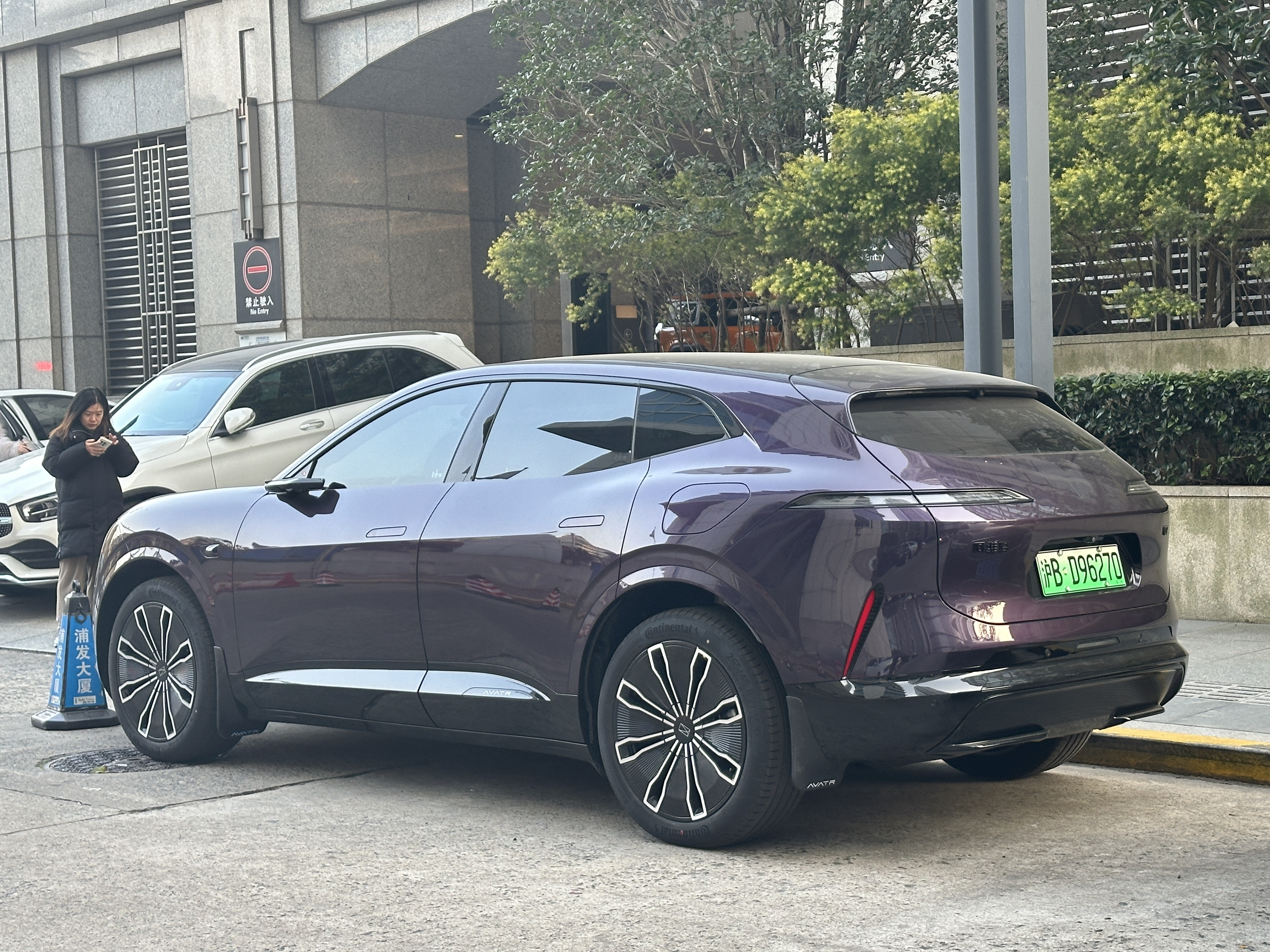
Rear view

In May 2024 Avatr revealed exterior images of the 07, with images of the interior revealed later in June and July. The 07 was fully unveiled at the Chengdu Auto Show on August 30, 2024 with pre-orders opening that day, and officially launched on September 26, 2024.

The 07 is built on the CHN platform, and has a front and rear track of 1,680 and 1,690 mm (66.1 and 66.5 in), respectively. It has an approach angle of 17 degrees and a departure angle of 21 degrees, and front and rear overhangs of 902 and 983 mm (35.5 and 38.7 in) respectively.

The 07 uses a fully aluminium suspension components mounted to a cast aluminium subframe. It has dual-wishbone independent front suspension and H-arm multi-link rear suspension with air springs and continuous damping control; the suspension has four user-selectable modes.

The 07 has a turning radius of 3.2 metres (10 ft). It passes the moose test at a speed of at least 82 km/h (51 mph) with the assistance of the Taihang stability control system, and has a 100–0 km/h (62–0 mph) stopping distance of under 34.5 metres (113 ft).

=== Exterior ===
The 07 shares the 'Avatr 2.0' design language seen on previous Avatr models. The front end features a dual-DRL design, with a separate high mounted horizontal strip above a larger C-shaped strip with the headlights located inside. Below the windshield, a 'HALO' display consisting of an array of 10,500 LEDs can show user-selectable animations and images. Fully electric models are equipped with active grille shutters for the small lower grille.

A LiDAR sensor is mounted on the front of the roof, and cameras are mounted on the front fenders. Conventional side mirrors come standard, but smaller digital camera-based units are optional. It comes standard with 20-inch wheels with 255/50R20 tires, which can be upgraded to 21-inch wheels and 265/45R21 tires.

The rear of the vehicle features thin wraparound high-mounted taillights, along with a short rear window.

=== Interior ===
The dashboard of the 07 features an array of two or four displays in a two-tier arrangement. A wide aspect ratio 35.4-inch 4K upper display acts as the gauge cluster and information display, and is placed atop a shelf near the base of the windshield. If equipped with digital side mirrors, the upper display is flanked by dual 6.7-inch screens displaying the side mirror camera feeds. A 15.6-inch touchscreen mounted lower on the dash is used to operate the infotainment system and to configure the upper display, and uses the HarmonyOS 4.0 operating system supplied by Huawei.

The octagonal steering wheel is flattened at the top and bottom to provide an unobstructed view of the upper display and assist ingress into the seat. The rim is connected to the column with metallic-accented dual spokes on the bottom and sides, which also contain the two multidirectional scrolling joystick steering wheel controls. The wheel is flanked by a turn indicator and wiper control stalk on the left, and a column mounted shifter on the right. The doors lack conventional door handles and instead use an electronic door release operated by pushing an illuminated strip-shaped button. The window switches for both the driver and passengers are pill-shaped toggle switches that extend outwards rather than being recessed.

The upper surface of the center console contains dual cooled wireless charging pads ahead of two self closing cupholders. Underneath, there is an open shelf and an array of USB ports for wired charging. The middle of the console contains a closed storage bin and armrest, and the rear has dual adjustable air vents and dual cupholders facing the rear seats.

The cabin has seats upholstered in Nappa leather, an Alcantara headliner, and wood accents on the center console. The front row seats are heated, ventilated, have 16-way power adjustment, and have a massaging function, and can extend the foot rest and steeply recline the backrest to provide a 'zero-gravity' rest mode. The rear outboard seats are also heated, ventilated and massaging. The center seatback folds down into an armrest, revealing two cupholders and a panel containing controls for the seat functions and the sunroof shade.

The 07 is equipped with a 16-speaker Meridian audio system standard, which can be upgraded to a 2000-watt 25-speaker Meridian system. The roof contains a 1.1 m^{2} (12 sq ft) panoramic glass roof with a powered forward-closing shade. The cabin has 39 ambient lighting elements, including in the center console and doors.

The cargo area has a capacity of 500 litres (17.7 cu ft) with a 60-litre (2.1 cu ft) underfloor compartment, which expands to 1,325 litres (46.8 cu ft) with the rear seats folded. There is also an underhood frunk, which offers an additional 90 litres (3.2 cu ft) of storage.

=== Driver assistance ===
Autonomous driving capabilities are provided by Huawei's Qiankun ADS 3.0 system, which utilizes the vehicle's 27-sensor array including a 192-line roof-mounted LiDAR.

The 07 is equipped with several ADAS systems such as adaptive cruise control, lane-keep assist, automatic emergency braking, 360-degree exterior cameras, and blind-spot monitoring.

== Avatr 07L ==
The long wheelbase version of the 07 as the 07L was teased on May 8, 2026. On May 9, Avatr unveiled exterior images of the vehicle online the same day. Part of its specifications, like its dimensions and powertrain setup was released on May 9, 2026 through China's MIIT filings.

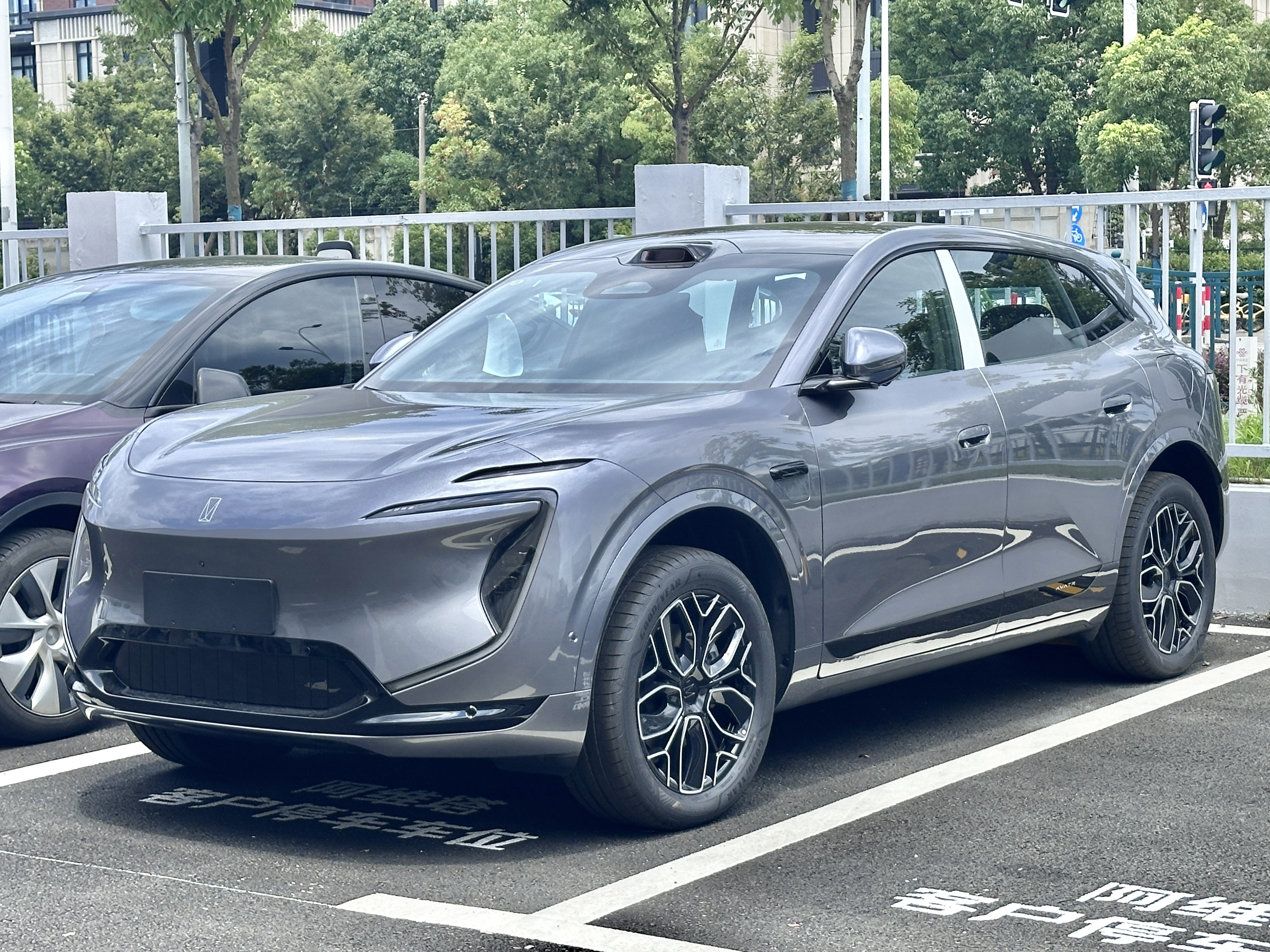
Avatr 07L

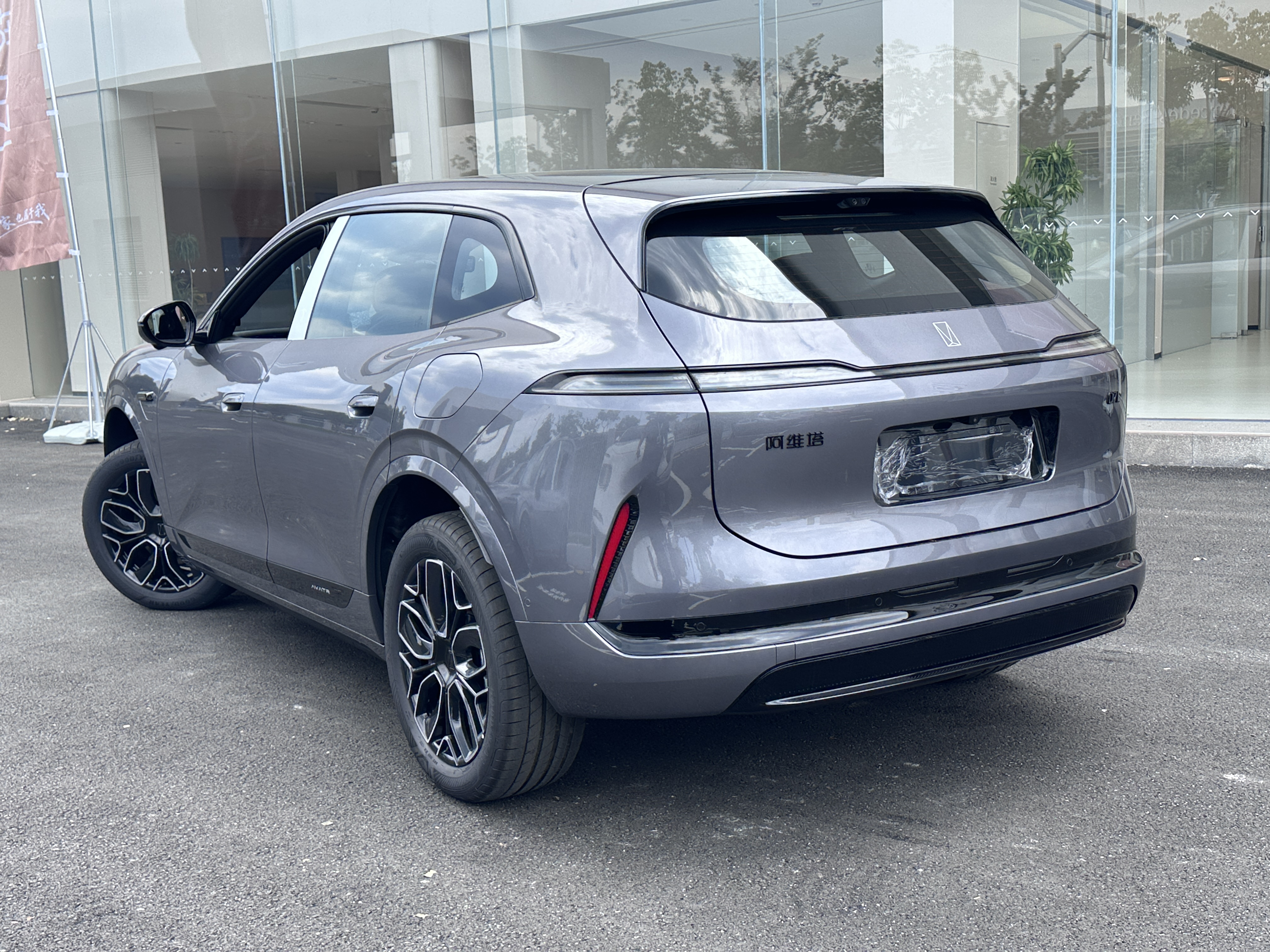
Rear

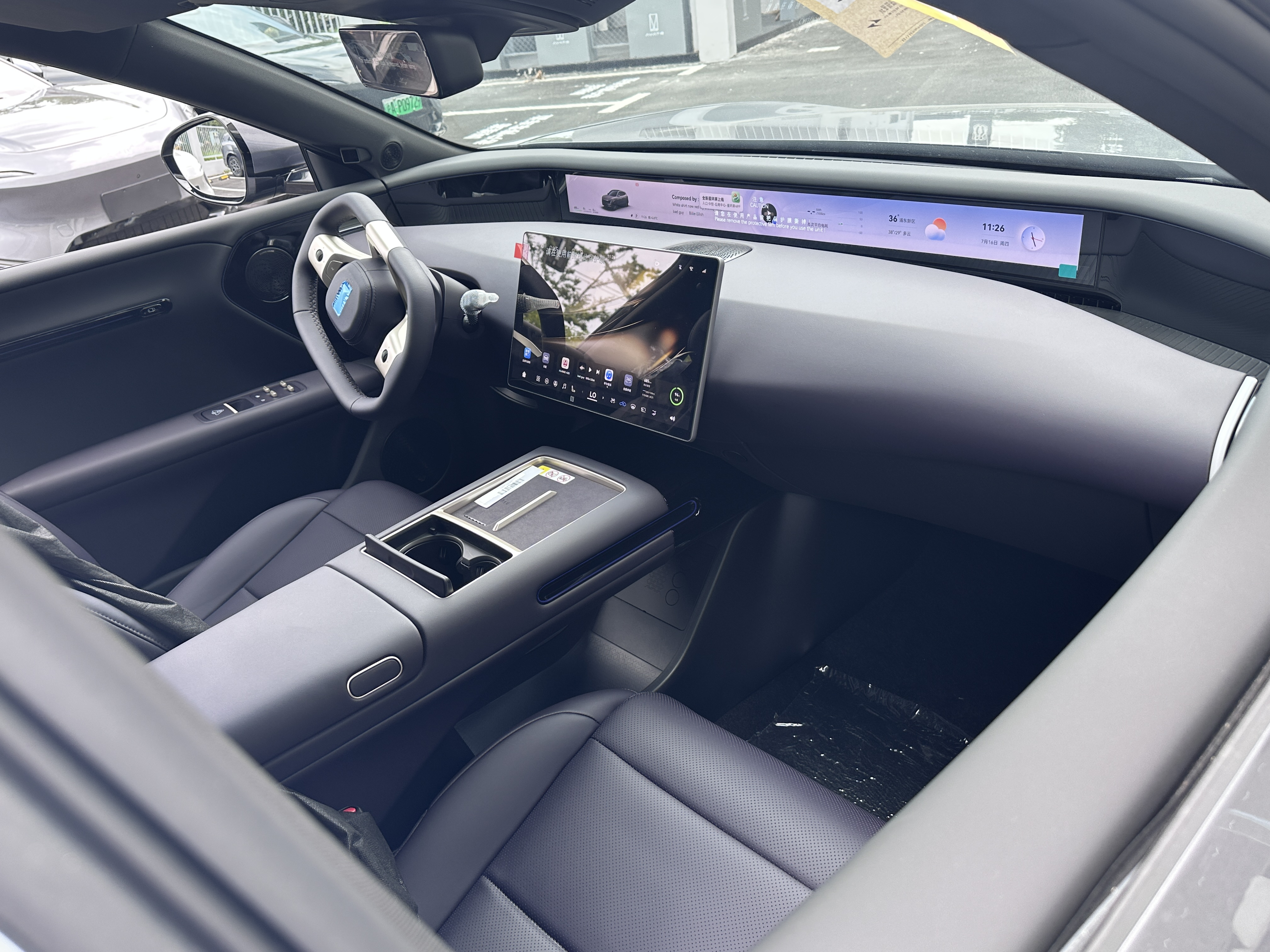
Interior

== Powertrain ==
The 07 is only available with electric powertrains, with either pure electric or range extender models available. Both options are available with either single-motor rear-wheel drive or dual-motor all-wheel drive configurations.

=== Range extender ===
Avatr's Kunlun range extender system debuts in the 07, which consists of a battery and petrol engine electrically powering drive motors.

The initial battery option is a 39.05 kWh CATL Freevoy hybrid-chemistry pack jointly developed by CATL and Avatr, and the 07 is the first vehicle to implement the new Freevoy-line of battery designs. It consists of both LFP and sodium-ion battery cells arranged in series, which allows for the sodium-ion cells to compensate for LFP cells' weaknesses in cold-weather performance and charge accuracy. As a result, CATL claims the battery can discharge at temperatures as low as −40 °C (−40 °F), charge at −30 °C (−22 °F), and performs like normal at −20 °C (−4 °F), while having 40% higher battery state-of-charge accuracy.

The engine is a JL469ZQ1 petrol 1.5-liter turbocharged four-cylinder unit supplied by Changan Auto, which has a peak output of 154 hp (115 kW; 156 PS) and is not mechanically connected to the wheels, instead powering an electric generator to charge the battery. It has an aluminium block and head and is equipped with direct injection and DOHC. It has a compression ratio of 15:1, allowing for peak thermal efficiency to reach 44.4% or 3.63 kWh/L of petrol. It can operate at air temperatures from −35 to 65 °C (−31 to 149 °F). Avatr claims that it produces less than 75dB of noise when operating due to NVH work done on the engine. To reduce vibration and noise by 90% at startup, the engine is placed at an optimal crank position at shutdown to reduce cylinder sound pressure by 62.5%.

The rear wheels are powered by a 310 hp (231 kW; 314 PS) permanent magnet synchronous motor manufactured by Huawei. It features over 30 oil coolant spray nozzles in the motor windings, and a 50-temperature sensor array that allows the motor to safely run without thermal throttling closer to the permanent magnet's 140 °C (284 °F) temperature limit, running at 132 °C (270 °F) rather than 110 °C (230 °F) like conventional motors. The single-speed gear reduction features 12 oil coolant spray nozzles. All-wheel drive versions have a supplemental 176 hp (131 kW; 178 PS) AC induction motor powering the front wheels, also manufactured by Huawei.

The 39.05 kWh battery has a charge rate of 3C, allowing for a 30–80% charge time of 15 minutes. Single-motor variants have an all-electric CLTC range rating of 245 kilometres (152 mi), and a total range of 1,152 kilometres (716 mi). Dual-motor variants have an all-electric CLTC range rating of 245 kilometres (152 mi), and a total range of 1,152 kilometres (716 mi). It has a peak discharge rate of 9C when at full charge, and a relatively high 7.7C while it is being charged by the petrol engine. This allows for a 0–100 km/h (0–62 mph) time of 4.9 seconds when fully charged, or 5.8 seconds while the engine is charging the battery, which is only a 15.5% increase compared to competitors who experience around a 45% increase in times.

A variant with a larger 52.4 kWh CATL Shenxing battery is expected to be released in 2025. It has a peak charge rate of 4C, allowing for a 30–80% charge time of 10 minutes. It has a CLTC all-electric range rating of 325 kilometres (202 mi), and a total range of 1,220 kilometres (758 mi).

=== Battery electric ===
The fully electric version of the 07 is equipped with a 82.16 kWh CATL Shenxing LFP battery pack. It has a 4C peak charge rate and runs at 800 V, allowing for a 0–80% charge time of 20 minutes.

The rear wheels are powered by a permanent magnet synchronous motor manufactured by Deepal, producing 338 hp (252 kW; 343 PS) and 365 N⋅m (269 lb⋅ft) of torque. All-wheel drive versions have a supplemental AC induction motor manufactured by Chongqing Tsingshan Industrial powering the front wheels, outputting 252 hp (188 kW; 255 PS) and 280 N⋅m (210 lb⋅ft) of torque.

Single-motor variants have a CLTC range rating of 650 kilometres (404 mi), while dual-motor variants have 610 kilometres (379 mi).

=== 07L ===
The Avatr 07L is powered exclusively by a battery electric powertrain unique from the standard 07. The standard variant uses a single rear motor which outputs 409 hp (305 kW; 415 PS) and 435 N⋅m (321 lb⋅ft) of torque, while the top variant uses a tri-motor all-wheel-drive system utilizing individual rear-wheel motors for a total of 955 hp (712 kW; 968 PS) and 996 N⋅m (735 lb⋅ft) of torque. It has a 89.33 kWh LFP CATL Shenxing battery that can charge from 30–80% in 10 minutes, and provides a CLTC range rating of 725 and 650 kilometres (450 and 404 mi) for single-motor and tri-motor models, respectively.

Specifications
Model		Battery		Power		Torque		Electric range	0–100 km/h (62 mph) time	Top speed	Kerb weight
Model		Type	Weight	Front motor	Rear motor	Front	Rear	CLTC	0–100 km/h (62 mph) time	Top speed	Kerb weight
07 REEV	RWD	39.05 kWh LFP CATL Freevoy	315 kg (694 lb)	—	310 hp (231 kW; 314 PS) ATDM01 PMSM	—	367 N⋅m (271 lb⋅ft)	230 km (143 mi)	6.6 s	190 km/h (118 mph)	2,240 kg (4,938 lb)
07 REEV	AWD	39.05 kWh LFP CATL Freevoy	315 kg (694 lb)	176 hp (131 kW; 178 PS) AYDM01 AC induction	310 hp (231 kW; 314 PS) ATDM01 PMSM	262 N⋅m (193 lb⋅ft)	367 N⋅m (271 lb⋅ft)	220 km (137 mi)	4.9 s	190 km/h (118 mph)	2,326 kg (5,128 lb)
07 BEV	RWD	82.16 kWh LFP CATL Shenxing	634 kg (1,398 lb)	—	338 hp (252 kW; 343 PS) XTDM39 PMSM	—	365 N⋅m (269 lb⋅ft)	650 km (404 mi)	6.3 s	200 km/h (124 mph)	2,315 kg (5,104 lb)
07 BEV	AWD	82.16 kWh LFP CATL Shenxing	634 kg (1,398 lb)	252 hp (188 kW; 255 PS) XYDM05 AC induction	338 hp (252 kW; 343 PS) XTDM39 PMSM	280 N⋅m (207 lb⋅ft)	365 N⋅m (269 lb⋅ft)	610 km (379 mi)	3.9 s	200 km/h (124 mph)	2,326 kg (5,128 lb)
07L BEV	RWD	89.33 kWh LFP CATL Shenxing	640 kg (1,411 lb)	—	409 hp (305 kW; 415 PS) ATDM14 PMSM	—	435 N⋅m (321 lb⋅ft)	725 km (450 mi)	5.9 s	200 km/h (124 mph)	2,335 kg (5,148 lb)
07L BEV	AWD	89.33 kWh LFP CATL Shenxing	640 kg (1,411 lb)	282 hp (210 kW; 286 PS) AYDM03 AC induction	673 hp (502 kW; 682 PS) 2×ATDM05 PMSM	246 N⋅m (181 lb⋅ft)	750 N⋅m (553 lb⋅ft)	650 km (404 mi)	3.7 s	200 km/h (124 mph)	2,480 kg (5,467 lb)

== Safety ==
C-NCAP test results 2025 Avatr 07 Max RWD (EV)
Category		%
Overall:	5 /5 stars	90.2%
Occupant protection:		93.18%
Vulnerable road users:		81.40%
Active safety:		93.23%

== Sales ==
The 07 received 11,673 non-refundable pre-orders within 20 hours of its launch on September 26, 2024. Deliveries of top trim 07 Ultra models started on November 4, 2024, over a month later than other variants due to parts supply issues. Avatr announced that 100,000th 07 was delivered to Konstantin Novoselov in Singapore on 9 July 2026.

Year	China		
Year	EV	EREV	Total
2024	6,697	13,667	20,234
2025	28,859	21,269	50,128
