= Beijing Xingtan 5X =

Mid-size SUV

Overview
- Manufacturer: BAIC Motor
- Production: 2026 (to commence)
- Assembly: China

Body and chassis
- Class: Mid-size SUV
- Body style: 5-door SUV
- Layout: Front-engine, four-wheel drive

Powertrain
- Engine: Petrol: 2.0 L Chery SQRF4J20 turbo I4; Petrol plug-in hybrid: 1.5 L A156T2H turbo I4
- Battery: 50.4 kWh LFP Sunwoda; 81.9 kWh LFP Eve Energy
- Electric range: 625 km (388 mi) (EV, CLTC); 232 km (144 mi) (PHEV, WLTP)

Dimensions
- Wheelbase: 2,875 mm (113.2 in)
- Length: 4,860–5,000 mm (191.3–196.9 in) (petrol); 4,865–5,005 mm (191.5–197.0 in) (EV/PHEV)
- Width: 2,000 mm (78.7 in)
- Height: 1,910 mm (75.2 in)
- Curb weight: 1,860–1,895 kg (4,101–4,178 lb) (petrol); 2,135–2,190 kg (4,707–4,828 lb) (EV); 2,160–2,355 kg (4,762–5,192 lb) (PHEV)

The Beijing Xingtan 5X (Chinese: 北汽星钽5X; pinyin: běiqì xīngtǎn 5X; lit. 'BAIC Star Tantalum 5X') is a mid-size SUV manufactured by BAIC Motor under the BAIC Off-Road brand. It is available with petrol-only, plug-in hybrid, and battery electric powertrains.

== Overview ==
The Xingtan 5X was revealed in MIIT regulatory filings on 7 August 2026. Pre-sales of the Xingtan 5X opened on 21 October 2026.

The styling is based on the CityHunter concept car unveiled at the 2026 Beijing Auto Show. The petrol version features a chrome waterfall grille, while electrified versions features a closed off front-end with horizontal elements. The sides feature flush pillars, roof rails, and a flat roofline. The rear features a side-opening tailgate with a square externally-mounted spare tire module.

The vehicle has approach, departure, and breakover angles of 26°, 28° and 23°, respectively, a ground clearance of 228 mm (9.0 in), and a wading depth of 600 mm (23.6 in). The all-wheel drive electric versions also have a locking rear differential and virtual locking center differential, a crawl mode, and hill-descent control. The roof rack has a capacity of 300 kg (660 lb) and it can tow up to 1,600 kg (3,500 lb). The electric versions have a length of 4,865 mm (191.5 in), which extends to 5,005 mm (197.0 in) with the optional rear external spare tire box. It has rear cargo volume of 2,231 L (78.8 cu ft) with the rear seats folded down, and is supplemented by a 96-litre (3.4 cu ft) drainable frunk. BAIC says that it has an effective cabin height of 1,307 mm (51.5 in) and a usable floor area ratio of 88.6%; additionally, the interior can be adjusted to provide a maximum open floor space length of 1.75 m (5.7 ft).

The Xingtan 5X is available with the Huawei Qiankun ADS 5 Pro system, which features one solid-state LiDAR mounted behind the windshield, three 4D mmWave radars, 11 cameras, and 12 ultrasonic sensors, and is capable of standard highway and optional urban assisted autonomous driving.

The interior features an 8.8-inch digital instrument cluster and twin 15.6-inch touchscreens serving as the central infotainment touchscreen and optional passenger entertainment display powered by a Qualcomm Snapdragon 8155 or 8295P SoC, and is supplemented by a row of physical buttons underneath. The center console features dual wireless charging pads, two separated cupholders, and a 8.2-litre (0.29 cu ft) cooler-heater in the storage bin with a temperature range of −6–50 °C (21–122 °F).

== Powertrain ==
The Xingtan 5X is available with petrol, plug-in hybrid, and battery electric powertrains.

The petrol version is equipped with a Chery-supplied 2.0-liter turbocharged inline-4 which outputs 251 hp (187 kW; 254 PS) (242 hp (180 kW; 245 PS) net power). It has a tow rating of up to 1,600 kg (3,500 lb).

The plug-in hybrid is equipped with a 1.5-liter turbocharged inline-4 in Miller cycle which outputs 141 hp (105 kW; 143 PS) (134 hp (100 kW; 136 PS) net power), and is paired with a single or pair of 268 hp (200 kW; 272 PS) (94 hp (70 kW; 95 PS) rated power) motors for two-wheel-drive and all-wheel-drive variants, respectively. It is equipped with an Sunwoda-supplied 50.4 kWh LFP battery pack which provides 232 km (144 mi) of electric WLTP range. The all-wheel-drive version has a tow rating of up to 1,600 kg (3,500 lb) and is capable of a 0–100 km/h (62 mph) time of 4.3 seconds.

The battery electric variant is equipped with 305 hp (227 kW; 309 PS) (98 hp (73 kW; 99 PS) rated power) permanent magnet synchronous motor. It is powered by an Eve Energy-supplied LFP battery pack. It uses an 800-volt architecture and can charge from 30–80% in 14.5 minutes.

Model	Battery		Engine	Power	Electric range		Top speed	Kerb weight
Model	Type	Weight	Engine	Power	WLTP	CLTC	Top speed	Kerb weight
Petrol	—	—	2.0 L SQRF4J20 turbo I4	242 hp (180 kW; 245 PS)	—	—	200 km/h (124 mph)	1,860–1,895 kg (4,101–4,178 lb)
PHEV	50.4 kWh LFP Sunwoda	360–367 kg (794–809 lb)	1.5 L A156T2H turbo I4	268 hp (200 kW; 272 PS)	232 km (144 mi)	310 km (193 mi)	200 km/h (124 mph)	2,160–2,215 kg (4,762–4,883 lb)
PHEV AWD	50.4 kWh LFP Sunwoda	360–367 kg (794–809 lb)	1.5 L A156T2H turbo I4	536 hp (400 kW; 543 PS)		285 km (177 mi)	200 km/h (124 mph)	2,310–2,355 kg (5,093–5,192 lb)
EV	81.9 kWh LFP Eve Energy	564 kg (1,243 lb)	—	305 hp (227 kW; 309 PS)		625 km (388 mi)	200 km/h (124 mph)	2,135–2,190 kg (4,707–4,828 lb)

== Sales ==
On 22 October 2026, Beijing Off-Road announced that the Xingtan 5X had received 17,876 pre-orders within 24 hours of opening; only pure electric and plug-in hybrid variants were available.
