= Maextro V800 =

Range-extended full-size luxury minivans

Maextro V800/V680
- Maextro V800

Overview
- Manufacturer: JAC Group
- Production: 2026–present
- Assembly: China: Feixi, Hefei, Anhui (Maextro Factory)

Body and chassis
- Class: Luxury minivan (M)
- Body style: 5-door minivan
- Platform: Tuling Longxing

Powertrain
- Engine: Petrol range extender: 1.5 L MP1800PHD I4 turbo
- Hybrid drivetrain: EREV
- Battery: 65 kWh NMC CATL Freevoy
- Range: 1,208–1,335 km (751–830 mi) (CLTC)
- Electric range: 275 km (171 mi) (WLTP); 330–340 km (205–211 mi) (CLTC)

Dimensions
- Wheelbase: 3,430 mm (135.0 in) (V800); 3,290 mm (129.5 in) (V680)
- Length: 5,495 mm (216.3 in) (V800); 5,320 mm (209.4 in) (V680)
- Width: 2,006 mm (79.0 in)
- Height: 1,850 mm (72.8 in)
- Curb weight: 3,070–3,190 kg (6,770–7,030 lb)

The Maextro V800 (Chinese: 尊界 V800; pinyin: Zūnjiè V800) and V680 (Chinese: 尊界 V680; pinyin: Zūnjiè V680) are range-extended luxury minivans manufactured by JAC Group under the Maextro brand in collaboration with HIMA, Huawei's multi-brand automotive alliance. It is positioned as the flagship minivan in HIMA's lineup and is the second vehicle from the Maextro brand.

== Overview ==
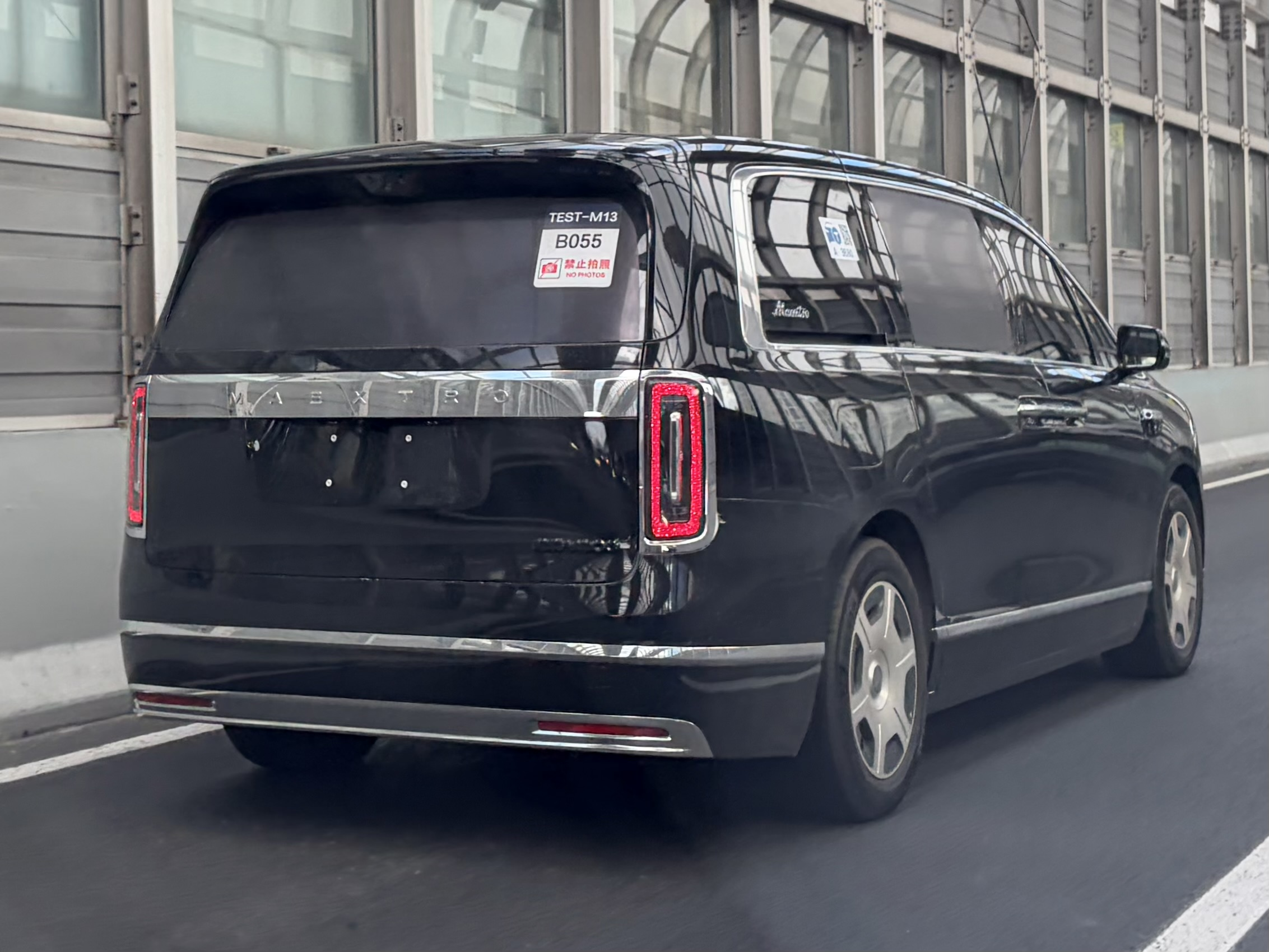
Rear view

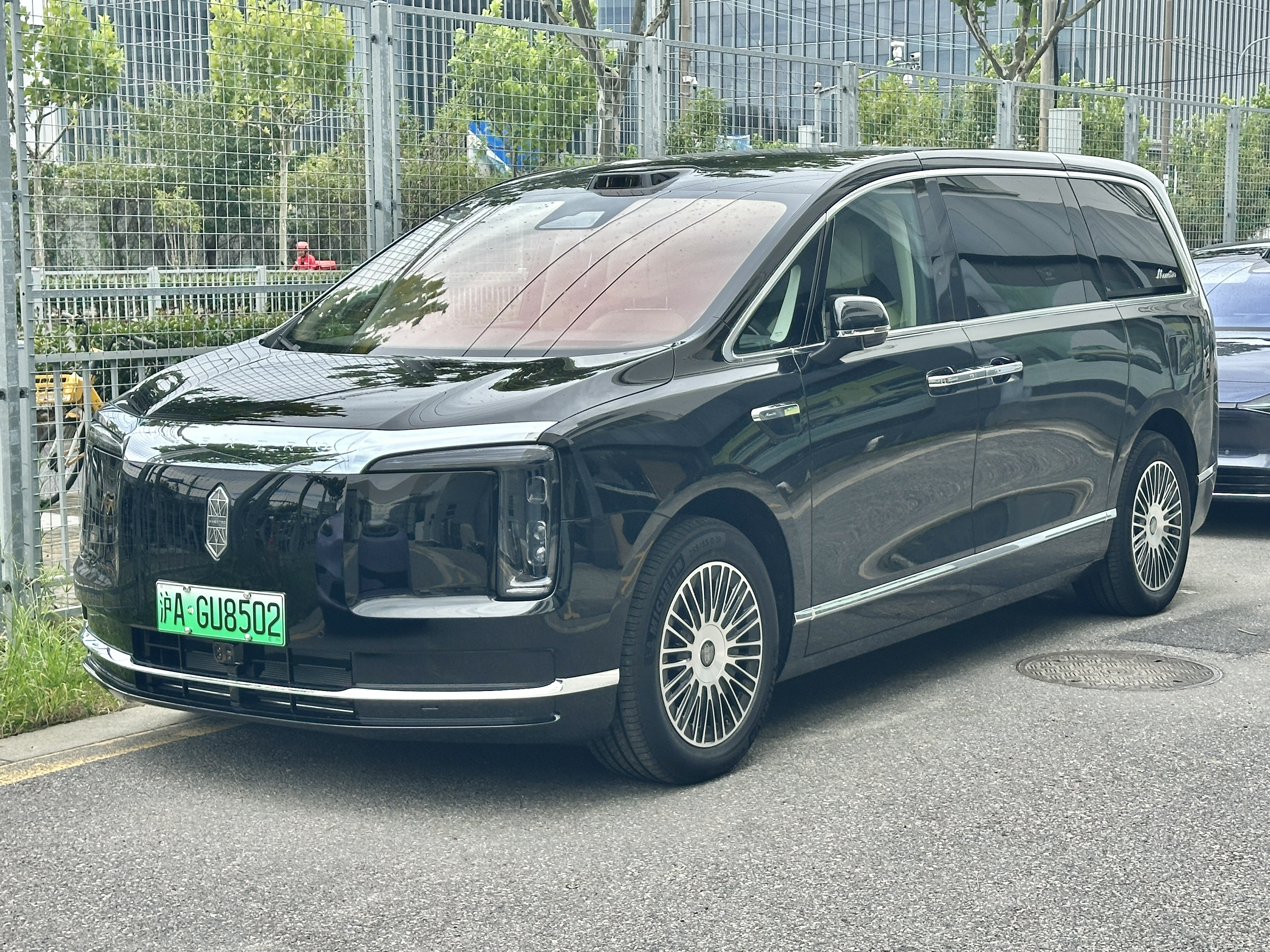
Maextro V680

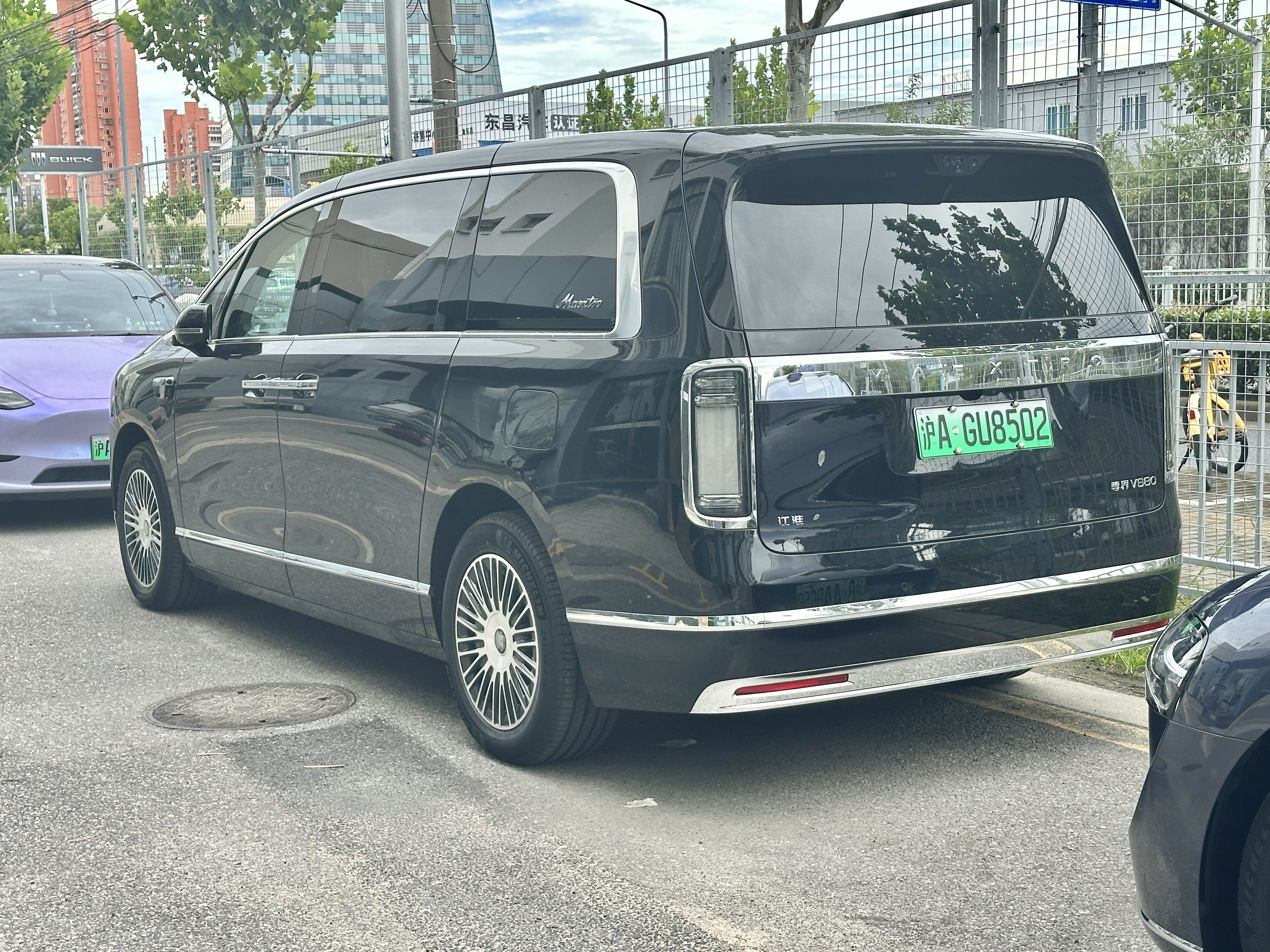
Rear view

On 8 June 2026, HIMA released an official video of the V800, which will be launched and delivered this year.

On 5 August 2026, the V800 and V680 models were officially launched. The V680 Prestige Edition is priced at 648,000 yuan, while the V800 Prestige, Executive, and Pilot editions are priced at 766,000 yuan, 866,000 yuan, and 1,018,000 yuan, respectively.

=== Design ===
The exterior of the Maextro V800 and V680 is defined by a "Sun-Ray" patterned emblem and optional interactive dynamic taillights; the emblem features a body-color base, while the vehicle offers optional dual-unit, million-pixel full-color smart projection headlights capable of displaying various intelligent light signals. The full-color smart interactive dynamic taillights are composed of 5,032 individual light elements and can display a range of customizable themes.

The interior and exterior color schemes for both models draw inspiration from the rich palette of nature. The V800 offers six exterior color options—Starry Black, Sun-Kissed Golden Brown, Dawn Gold-Black, Cloud-and-Water Azure, Auspicious Snow Silver-Red, and Soaring Ink-White (the V680 in five)—and five interior color options: Ink-Wash Brown, Radiant Sun Brown, Warm Apricot Brown, Cloud-and-Water Azure (exclusive to the matching exterior scheme), Cloud-Reflected Red (exclusive to the Auspicious Snow Silver-Red exterior), and Moonlight Apricot (the V680 in four).

The V800 and V680 models feature aerodynamic design, with a naturally streamlined body and large, flat side windows, resulting in excellent wind resistance. The V800 measures 5495 mm × 2006 mm × 1850 mm with a wheelbase of 3430 mm and a drag coefficient of 0.259Cd, while the V680 measures 5320 mm × 2006 mm × 1850 mm with a wheelbase of 3290 mm and a drag coefficient of 0.264Cd.

=== Interior ===
Regarding the interior, the V800 features an L-shaped, high-profile center console that creates distinct zones for the front and rear cabins, integrating functions such as charging, secure storage, and refrigeration. The console’s three-tiered storage system comprises an electrically operated lift-up storage bin, a concealed pen tray, and a private, electrically operated storage compartment. An optional private beverage station is also available.

the model's second-row "Lingyun" seats feature a 20-layer composite structure and comprehensive constant-temperature heating. They offer 20 independent massage points and a unique active wrap-around lumbar support that contours to the 26 vertebrae of the spine, enhancing support by 28%. Equipped with 14 high-precision sensors, the seats automatically adapt to various body types and sitting postures. Additionally, they are fitted with a flip-up armrest touchscreen and a tri-fold table.

=== Technologies ===
the V800 is built on the MAEXTRO-exclusive Tuling Longxing platform and features an 800V fully active suspension system along with steer-by-wire technology.

The Domain-Wide Integrated Architecture 2.0 enables integrated perception across all road conditions, multi-dimensional deep fusion, cross-validation, and domain-wide deep integrated control. It supports ±12° rear-wheel steering and a "jump" mode for extrication.

The V800 features an omnidirectional, multi-sensor fusion perception system; the vehicle is equipped with 40 sensors, including a forward-facing dual-redundant LiDAR matrix and an omnidirectional matrix of four high-precision solid-state LiDARs.

== Powertrain ==
The vehicle utilizes Huawei’s Jujing 800V high-voltage battery platform and features an extended-range powertrain comprising a 1.5-liter turbocharged range extender and dual electric motors. The range extender delivers a maximum power of 122 kW (164 hp; 166 PS) (127 kW (170 hp; 173 PS) gross), while the front and rear motors offer peak power outputs of 160 kW and 230 kW, respectively for a total output of 390 kW (523 hp; 530 PS). Equipped with a 65 kWh (63.2 kWh usable) CATL NMC battery pack, the V800 offers a CLTC pure-electric range of up to 340 km (211 mi) and a CLTC combined range of 1,335 km (830 mi); the V680 offers a CLTC pure-electric range of 340 km (211 mi) and a CLTC combined range of 1,208 km (751 mi).

Specifications
Model	Battery	Power output			Torque	Gasoline engine		Range		10–80% DCFC time	0–100 km/h (62 mph)	Top speed	Kerb weight
Model	Battery	Front	Rear	Total		Type	Power	WLTP	CLTC	10–80% DCFC time	0–100 km/h (62 mph)	Top speed	Kerb weight
V800	65 (63.2) kWh NMC CATL	160 kW (215 hp; 218 PS)	230 kW (308 hp; 313 PS)	390 kW (523 hp; 530 PS)	604 N⋅m (445 lb⋅ft)	1.5L turbo	122 kW (164 hp; 166 PS)	275 km (171 mi)	330–340 km (205–211 mi)	10.5 min (6C)	5.7 s	200 km/h (124 mph)	3,120–3,190 kg (6,878–7,033 lb)
V680	65 (63.2) kWh NMC CATL	160 kW (215 hp; 218 PS)	230 kW (308 hp; 313 PS)	390 kW (523 hp; 530 PS)	604 N⋅m (445 lb⋅ft)	1.5L turbo	122 kW (164 hp; 166 PS)	275 km (171 mi)	340 km (211 mi)	10.5 min (6C)	5.6 s	200 km/h (124 mph)	3,070 kg (6,768 lb)

== Sales ==
The V680 and V800 received over 3,500 pre-orders within 24 hours of their launch.

== Controversy ==
On October 8, 2026, Dcar released a video of an emergency braking test of Maextro V800, showing that the brake pedal brackets fractured on all three Maextro V800 vehicles tested during emergency braking from 100 km/h to a complete stop. Following the incident, shares of Maextro's parent company, JAC Group, hit the daily downward price limit in A-share trading that day. Maextro subsequently issued a statement describing the test as involving "non-standard extreme testing conditions", while also pledging to improve the design of the component. The company also offered 'free upgrades' for those who have obtained the vehicle, avoiding using the term 'Recall'. By the following day, the video was no longer accessible on multiple platforms.
