= SVOLT =

Chinese lithium battery manufacturer

SVOLT Energy Technology Company, Limited
- Trade name: SVOLT
- Native name: 蜂巢能源
- Company type: Subsidiary
- Industry: Electric batteries
- Founded: 2018; 8 years ago
- Headquarters: Changzhou, Jiangsu, China
- Key people: Yang Hongqin (Chairman & CEO)
- Website: svolt.cn

SVOLT Energy Technology Co., Ltd (Chinese: 蜂巢能源; pinyin: Fēngcháo Néngyuán; lit. 'Honeycomb Energy') is a Chinese battery manufacturing subsidiary of Great Wall Motor spun off in 2018 that specializes in developing and manufacturing of lithium-ion batteries for electric vehicles and energy storage systems. In the first half of 2025, SVOLT was the 9th largest EV battery supplier in China with 2.09% market share.

== History ==
SVOLT originated in Great Wall Motor as a battery development project which started in 2012, which then was then made a business unit in December 2016 as production began. It was later separated into a division under Great Wall in February 2018, before being transferred to Great Wall holding company Baoding Ruimao as a subsidiary later that year in October.

In late 2023, SVOLT planned to raise RMB¥15 billion through an IPO on the Shanghai STAR Market, but the company cancelled its IPO application in December 2023.

== Overview ==
SVOLT is headquartered in the Jintan District of Changzhou, Jiangsu.

As of 2022, SVOLT has battery manufacturing facilities in nine cites in China: Baoding, Hebei; Suining, Sichuan; Chengdu, Sichuan; Huzhou, Zhejiang; Ma'anshan, Anhui; Shangrao, Jiangxi; Taizhou, Jiangsu; Nanjing, Jiangsu; and Yancheng, Jiangsu. In December 2021, SVOLT plans to raise its production capacity to 600 GWh by 2025, rising from its previous goal of 320 GWh. In February 2024, SVOLT's joint venture battery facility with Banpu Next in Chonburi, Thailand started volume production. It has an annual production capacity of over 20,000 packs and will serve local Thai car production facilities of Great Wall Motor and Neta.

As of mid-2022, SVOLT has R&D facilities in Baoding, Hebei; Wuxi, Shenzhen, as well as South Korea and India. Additional R&D are under construction in the U.S., Europe and Japan. In January 2022, SVOLT announced a new R&D and entrepreneurship center in Shanghai's Jiading District known as Zhangyu Boshi (Chinese: 章鱼博士; pinyin: zhāngyú bóshì; lit. 'Doctor Octopus'). In June 2022, SVOLT had over 3,000 R&D personnel worldwide with over 3,800 patents registered.

=== European operations ===
In November 2020, SVOLT announced that it would invest €2 billion build two factories in Saarland, Germany: a 24 GWh battery cell facility and a battery module and pack assembly facility. Production at the assembly plant was expected to begin in mid-2020 at the earliest, while the battery cell plant was expected to come online in late 2023. In September 2022, SVOLT announced plans to build an additional 16GWh battery cell production facility in Brandenburg, Germany with construction expected to complete in 2025.

In October 2024, SVOLT decided to shut its European headquarters in Frankfurt and end its operations in Europe by January 2025, and ceased construction work on all European factories. SVOLT said that the decision was due to several factors out of its control, including decreasing EV sales in the region, punitive EU tariffs, market distortion due to uneven subsidies, and discussions by the European Union to potentially repeal its ban on internal combustion engine vehicles. Additionally, analysts believe that it is due to the large amount of capital needed (RMB¥30 billion, US$4.2 billion) to construct the production facilities at a time when the company is struggling with its competitiveness in its core Chinese market. This decision comes after Great Wall decided to close its European headquarters in Munich in May 2024 and pause further expansion into new European markets due to poor sales of its EVs.

== Technologies ==
SVOLT was the company to produce cobalt-free high-nickel-cathode lithium-ion batteries in volume, which was first presented at the 2021 Chengdu Motor Show. The batteries were offered in the Ora Cherry Cat in a 82.5 kWh pack with a 170 Wh/kg energy density. The company said it developed the battery chemistry in response to the rapidly growing electric vehicle industry's reliance on cobalt, which could face supply shortages.

In July 2025, SVOLT said it plans to begin trial production of its first generation of semi-solid-state electrolyte batteries in Q4 2025, with mass production planned for 2027. The first generation cells are pouch cells with a capacity of 140 Ah and an energy density of 300 Wh/kg, and will be supplied to Mini for its next generation of vehicles planned for 2027. The second generation of semi-solid state batteries will be 78 Ah capacity and 360 Wh/kg energy density. SVOLT's first generation solid-state batteries will have a capacity of 68 Ah and an energy density of 400 Wh/kg, and is primarily targeted for use in low-altitude flight followed by automotive applications.

=== Short blade battery ===
At an annual Battery Day event held in December 2021, SVOLT launched the Short Blade battery cell range targeted at electrified vehicles. They are prismatic cells with lengths between 300–600 mm (12–24 in) and charging rates of 1.6-4C manufactured using SVOLT's advances in high-speed stacking production processes for prismatic cells which circumvent the limitations of the winding production process required for cylindrical cells.

=== Dragonscale Armor battery ===
SVOLT unveiled its Dragonscale Armor (Chinese: 龙鳞甲; pinyin: Lóng Kǎijiǎ) battery technology in December 2022. It is a battery pack structure technology like BYD's Blade or CATL's Qilin, and allows for a 76% pack volumetric efficiency when using prismatic LFP cells.

In July 2025, SVOLT announced that its second generation Dragonscale Armor battery rolled off the production line in its facility in Huzhou, Zhejiang. It is capable of 5C charging rates for a 20–80% charge in 12 minutes, and has a capacity of up to 65 kWh with NMC chemistry for use in EREV applications, which SVOLT claims is the world's largest in volume production.
