= Dongfeng Motor Corporation =

Chinese state-owned automobile manufacturer

Dongfeng Motor Corporation Ltd.
- Native name: 东风汽车集团有限公司
- Type: State-owned enterprise
- Industry: Automotive
- Predecessor: Dongfeng Heavy Industries; Dongfeng Locomotive Works
- Founded: 1969; 57 years ago
- Headquarters: Wuhan, Hubei, China
- Area served: Worldwide
- Key people: Yang Qing (chairman)
- Products: Passenger cars Commercial vehicles Buses; Automotive components
- Revenue: 601,501,280,000 renminbi (2018)
- Owner: SASAC
- Number of employees: 161,377 (2012)
Subsidiaries
Dongfeng Motor Group	(66.86%)
Dongfeng Yulon	(JV–50%)

Chinese name
- Simplified Chinese: 东风汽车集团有限公司
- Traditional Chinese: 東風汽車集團有限公司
- Literal meaning: Dongfeng Motor Group Corporation Limited
Transcriptions
Standard Mandarin
- Hanyu Pinyin: Dōngfēng Qìchē Jítuán Yǒuxiàn Gōngsī

former Chinese name
- Simplified Chinese: 东风汽车公司
- Traditional Chinese: 東風汽車公司
- Literal meaning: Dongfeng Motor Corporation
Transcriptions
Standard Mandarin
- Hanyu Pinyin: Dōngfēng Qìchē Gōngsī

Chinese short name
- Simplified Chinese: 东风公司
- Traditional Chinese: 東風公司
- Literal meaning: East wind Company
Transcriptions
Standard Mandarin
- Hanyu Pinyin: Dōngfēng Gōngsī

Chinese short name
- Simplified Chinese: 东风汽车
- Traditional Chinese: 東風汽車
- Literal meaning: East wind Motor vehicle
Transcriptions
Standard Mandarin
- Hanyu Pinyin: Dōngfēng Qìchē
- Website: www.dfmc.com.cn (China) www.dongfeng-global.com (Global)

Dongfeng Motor Corporation Ltd. is a Chinese central state-owned automobile manufacturer headquartered in Wuhan, Hubei. Founded in 1969, it is currently the smallest of the "Big Four" state-owned car manufacturers of China with 671,000 sales in 2023, below SAIC Motor, Changan Automobile and FAW Group.

The company develops and markets commercial and consumer vehicles under its own branding, such as M-Hero, Voyah, Aeolus, Nammi, Forthing, as well as under foreign-branded joint ventures such as Dongfeng Honda, Dongfeng Nissan and Dongfeng Peugeot-Citroën (all via subsidiary Dongfeng Motor Group). In 2021, foreign-branded cars took 79% of sales. It also manufactures parts and cooperates with foreign companies.

As a state-owned enterprise of China, Dongfeng is controlled and managed by State-owned Assets Supervision and Administration Commission of the State Council (SASAC), which under Chinese law performs the functions of an investor.

== History ==
=== Background and founding ===
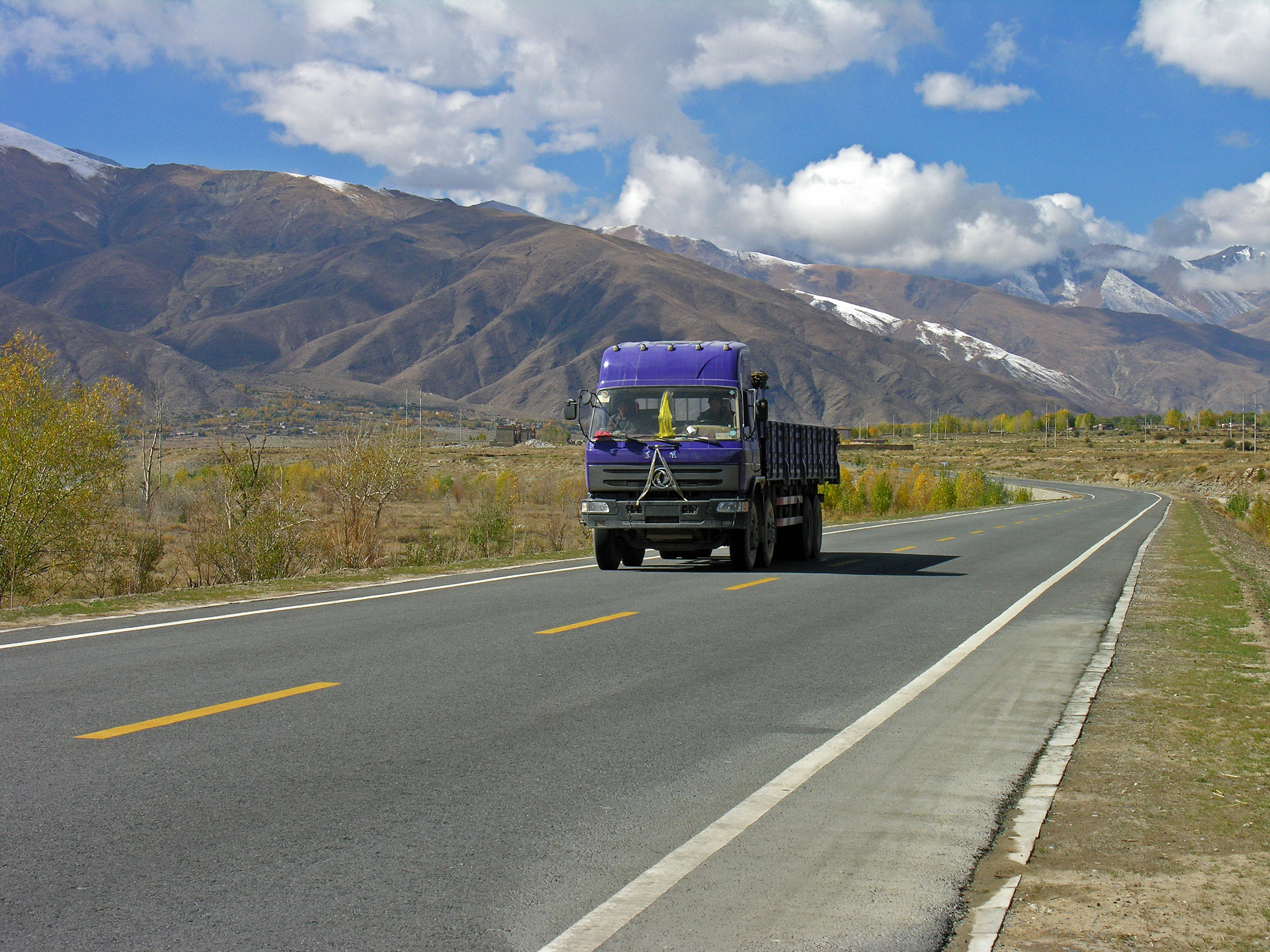
A Dongfeng Motor truck in Tibet

During the Korean War, there was a need for trucks to be used on the battlefield. The Ministry of Machinery planned a factory to build an imitation of the GAZ-51 truck. This was originally planned to be at Qingshan District, Wuhan, and later revised to Wuchang District, also in Wuhan. In 1955, these sites were disregarded as being too vulnerable to air raids, and Chengdu was chosen as the proposed site. The reasoning is also mentioned in a dictate of Chairman Mao Zedong; as part of his "Third Front" strategy However, due to the poor state of the economy, the plans were shelved.

In 1957, Hunan was picked as the site for the proposed truck factory, as the Yangtze basin area of the province didn't have any heavy industry yet. In 1960 preparations started at the site in Shiyan, but were abruptly halted. As the Chinese economy improved, and as a result of the Sino-Soviet split, production of military trucks came into the spotlight again, and construction of the Second Automobile Works (第二汽车制造厂) was included in the third five-year plan in 1965.

The company was officially founded in 1969 at a village of 100 residents, that would later grow to become Shiyan city. This remote location was chosen as its topography consisted of over 40 shallow valleys, allowing factories to be concealed, while also being on the route of the Xiangyang–Chongqing railway. Due to its remote countryside location with limited equipment, the company only managed to produce 200 automobiles by 1972.

=== Mass production (1975–2000) ===
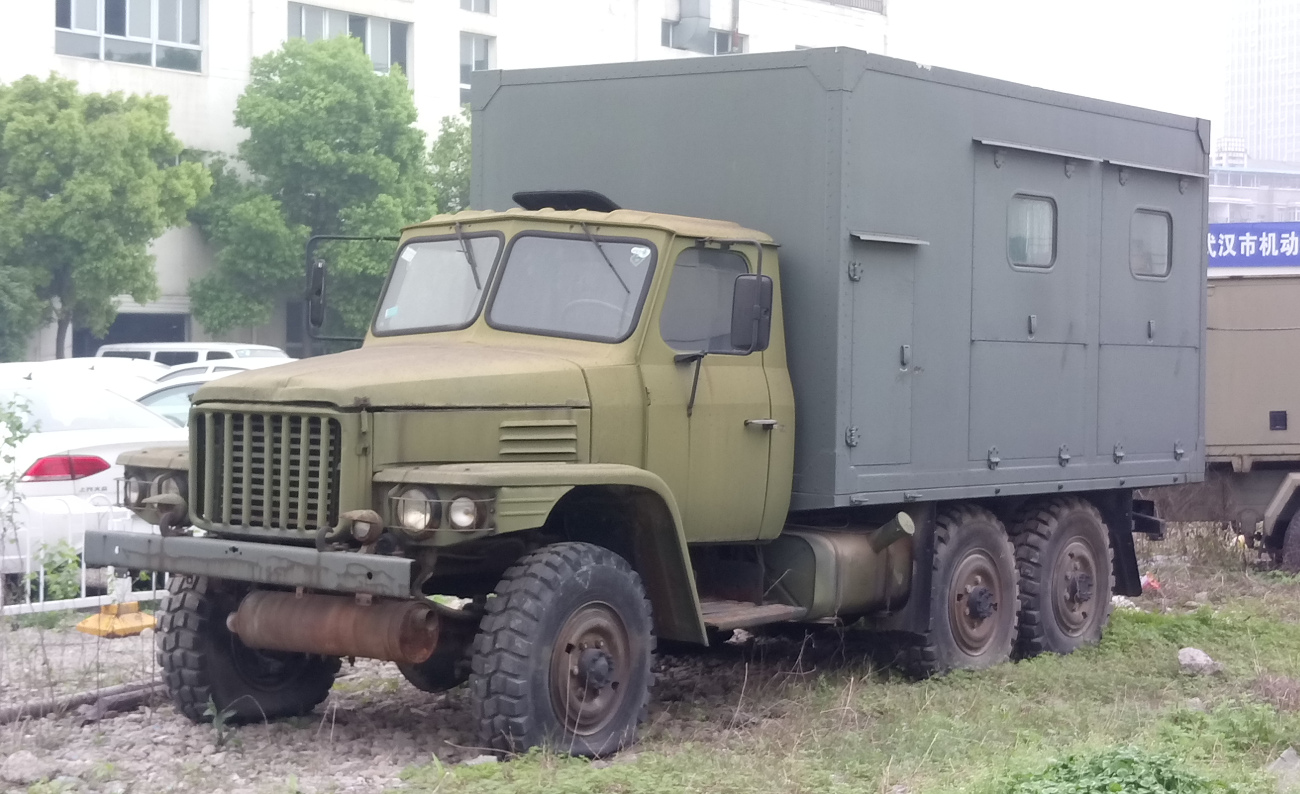
Dongfeng EQ240

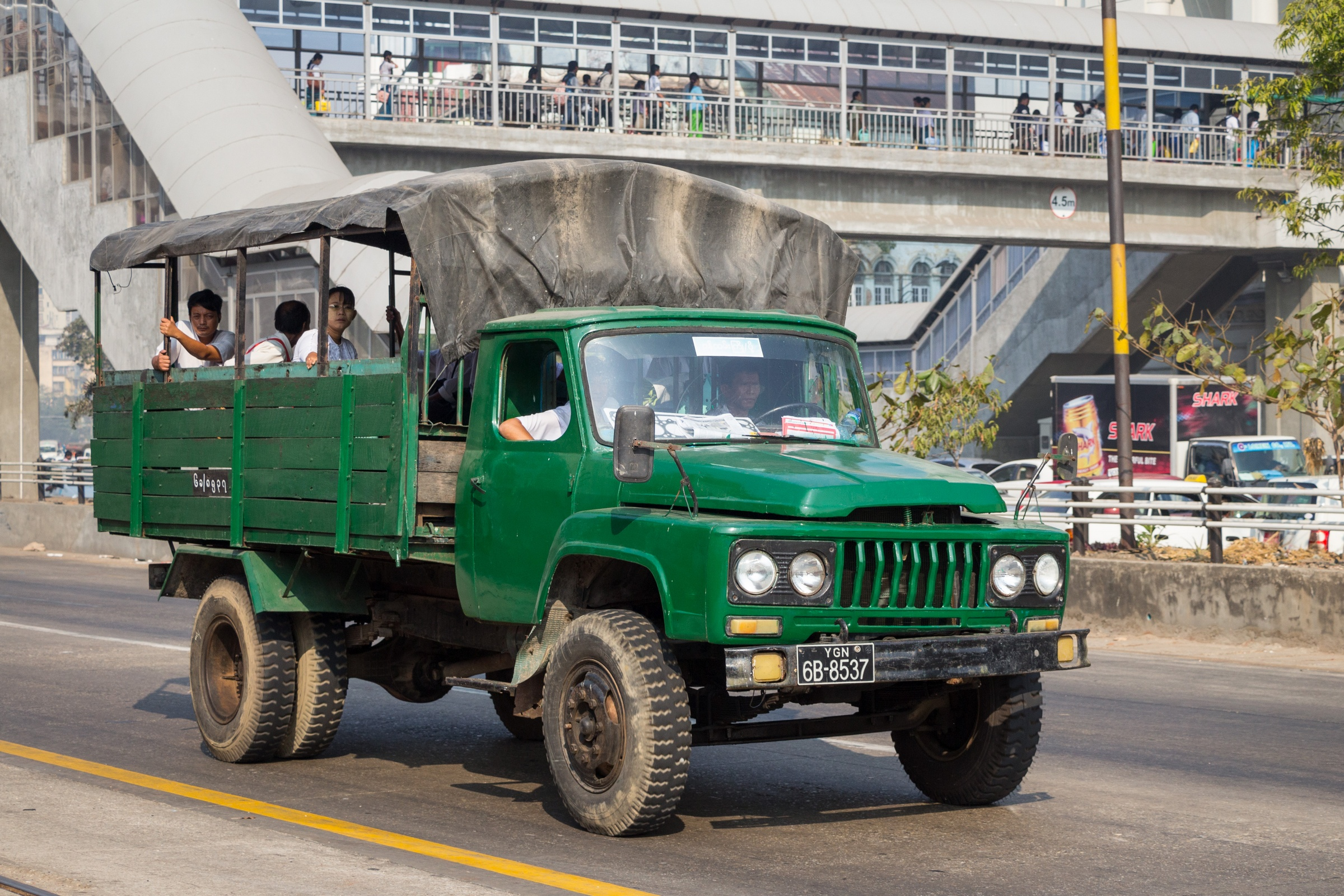
Dongfeng EQ140

In 1975, the first EQ240 2.5-ton Dongfeng truck was produced, followed by the EQ140 5-ton model in 1978, which was also the first civilian truck by the company. At its peak the EQ140 held a domestic market share of 66%. In 1986, Dongfeng surpassed 100,000 vehicles produced annually. In 1987, a new 3-ton model was launched.

Traditionally manufacturing commercial vehicles, by 2001 these made up about 73% of Dongfeng's production. By 2012, that figure had reversed, and 73% of manufactures were passenger cars. However, the percentage of consumer offerings was likely lower as passenger car counts may include microvans, tiny commercial vehicles that are popular in China.

Between 1978 and 1985 alongside the reform and opening ups instituted by Deng Xiaoping, Dongfeng was transformed from a manufacturer of two heavy-duty trucks with fragmented operations and ownership into a single, centrally managed enterprise. This process included placing all Dongfeng operations—from part manufacture to vehicle assembly—under the control of a single business entity and the merger of six truck production bases as well as a number of other companies previously controlled by provincial governments. Post-1985, further reforms took place that allowed Dongfeng greater autonomy; the company was removed from the direct administrative control of the central government.

By the mid-1980s, its assets had tripled from those initially given to it by the state in 1981, and management was desirous of even greater production capacity. But in 1995, the company was experiencing financial difficulties as was the case with many Chinese automobile manufacturers at this time. The situation was still dire in 1998 precipitating a 1999 restructuring of the company.

In 1992, the company changed its name to Dongfeng, or "East Wind" in Chinese.

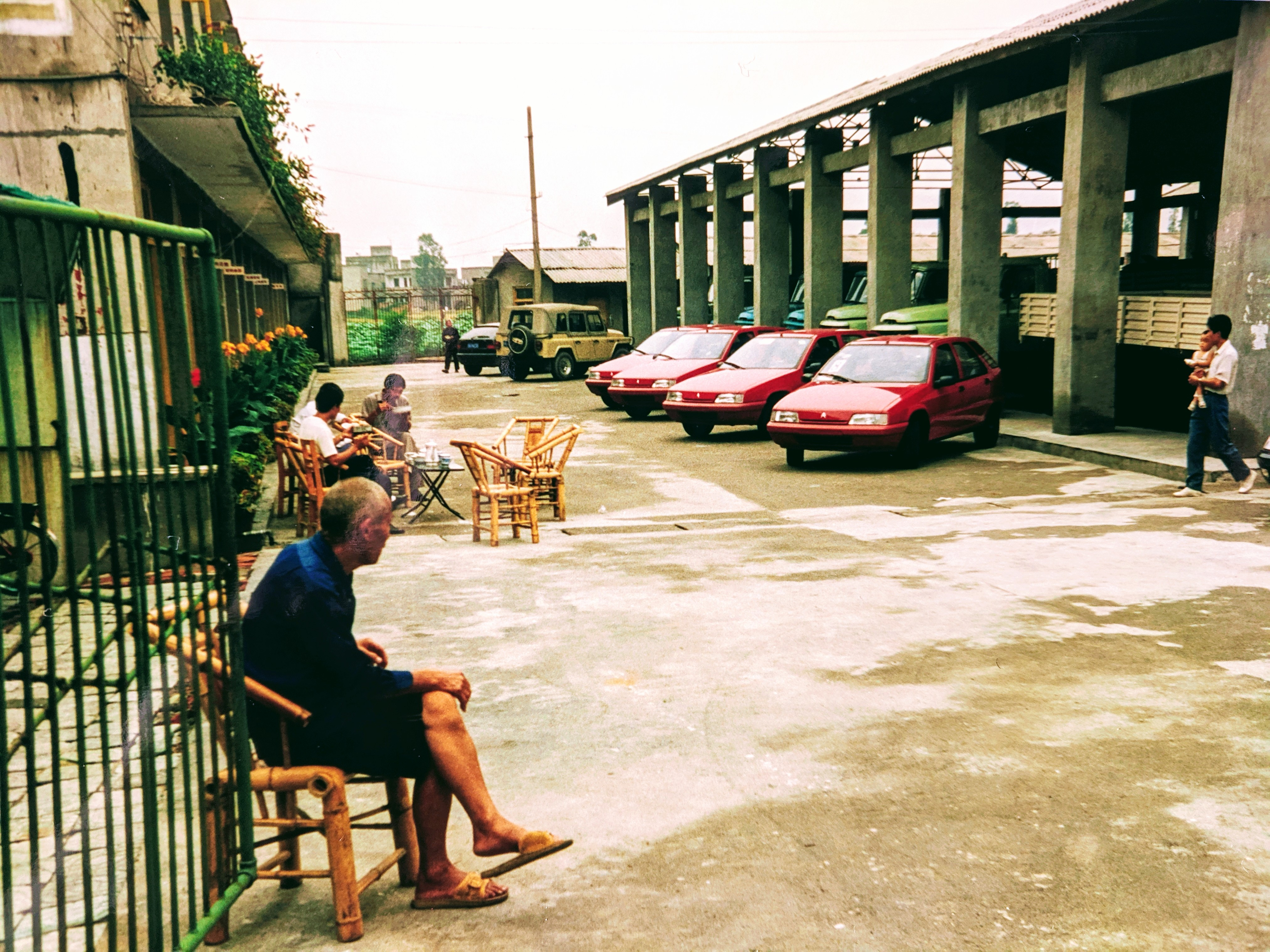
New Dongfeng trucks and Citroën Fukang models for sale – in Chengdu 1994

This state owned enterprise has come into conflict with authority at both the national and provincial levels. Alongside First Automotive Works it saw the successful dismantling of the Automobile Corporation, a central government entity presumably tasked with preventing non-competitive business practices through dictating output volumes and curtailing purchasing as well as exasperation at the right of the State to make managerial appointments.

The Chinese partner in many Sino-foreign joint venture companies, Dongfeng initiated most of these cooperative efforts with foreign firms in the early 2000s. But its first was established in 1992 with French PSA Group. Named Dongfeng Citroën Automobile Company (DCAC), it was the forerunner to the current Dongfeng Peugeot-Citroën Automobile Limited (DPCA).

=== 2000–2010 ===
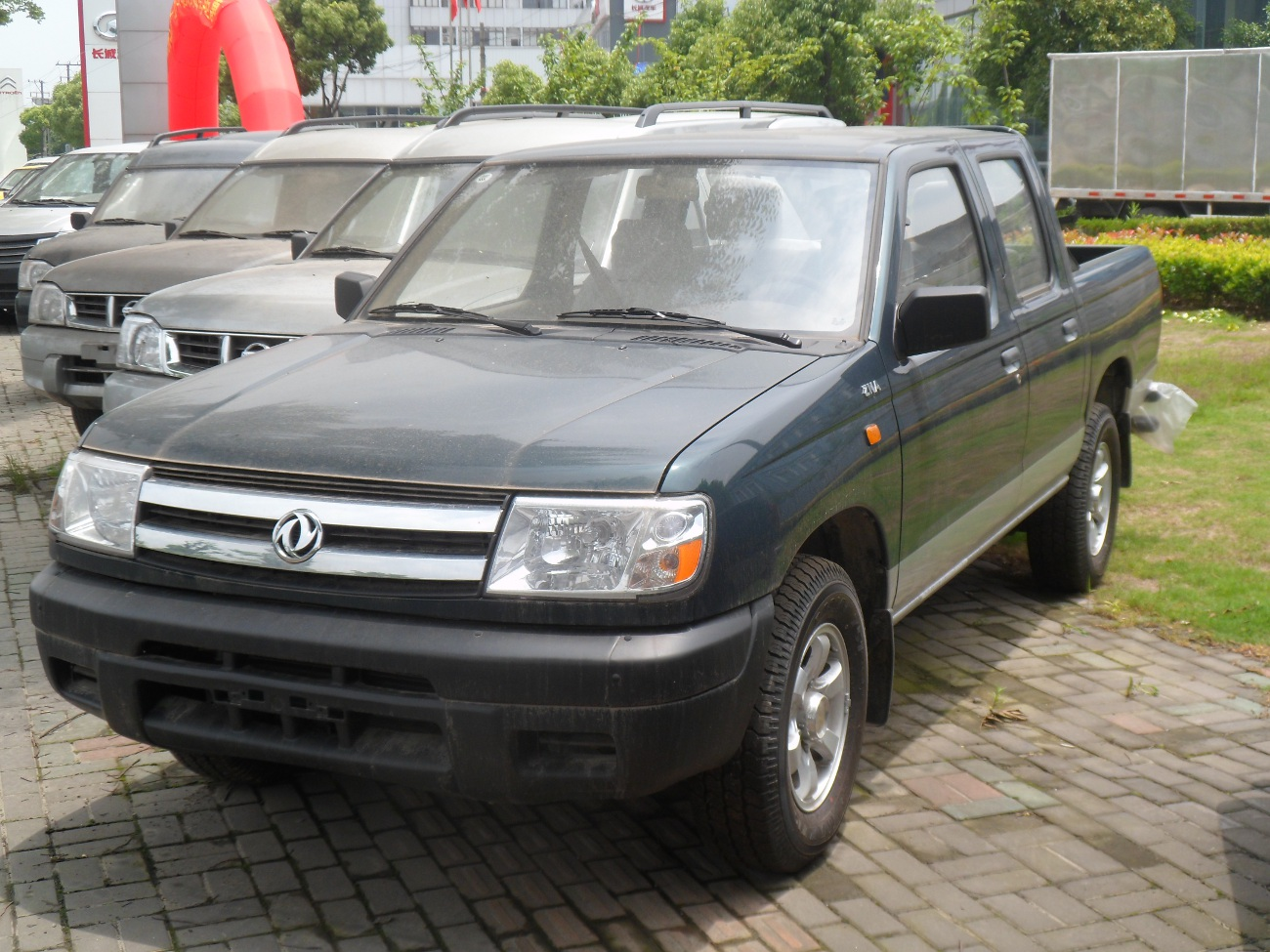
Dongfeng Rich

By 2003, Dongfeng had established joint ventures with Kia Motors (Dongfeng Yueda Kia, 2002), Honda (Dongfeng Honda, 2003), and Nissan (Dongfeng Motor Co., Ltd., 2003). As of 2011, it had more Sino-foreign joint ventures than any other Chinese automaker.

In 2004, intermediate holding company of the group, Dongfeng Motor Group, became a listed company in the Hong Kong Stock Exchange; Dongfeng Yueda Kia remained in the unlisted portion of the group.

Dongfeng announced in November 2006 that they intend to sell their vehicles in Japan.

In 2009, it sold 1.9 million vehicles ranking second among domestic automakers and third overall.

=== 2010–present ===
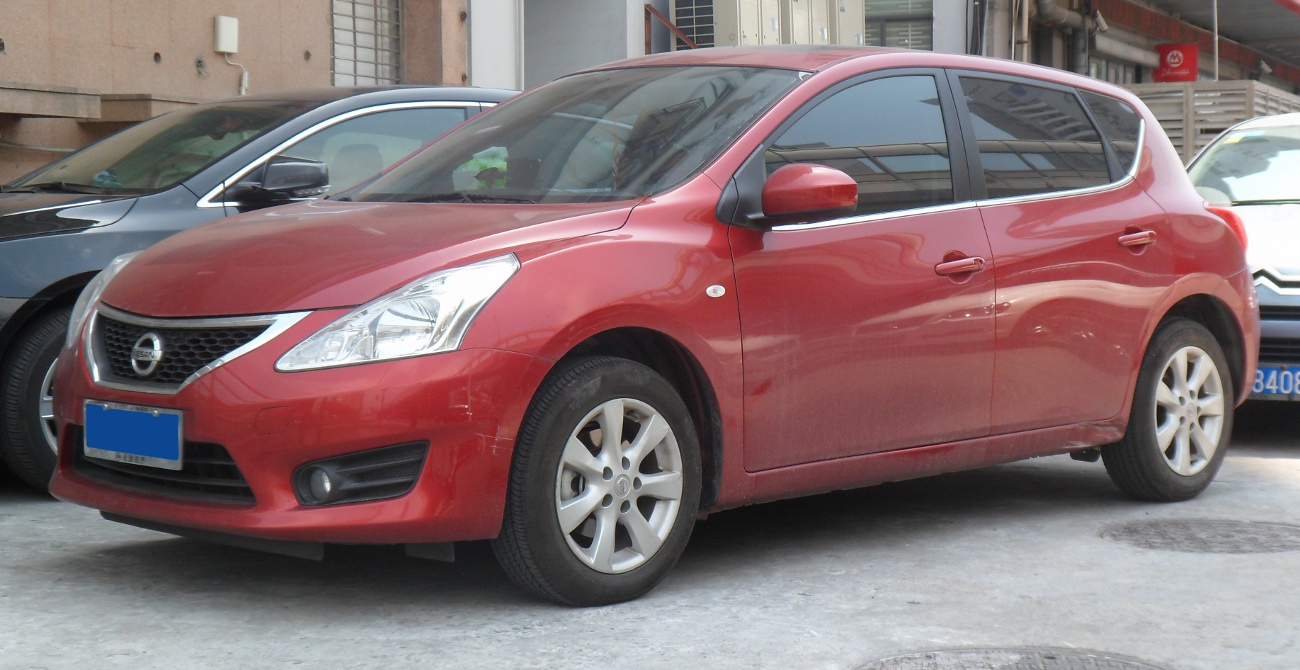
A Dongfeng-built Nissan Tiida

In 2010, the company sold 2.72 million units, making it the second most-productive Chinese vehicle-maker. It reported 1.72 million sales of passenger vehicles that same year.

2011 production figures put the company in second place, in terms of production volume, in its home market; Dongfeng produced 3.06 million vehicles that year.

It was the second-largest Chinese automaker in 2012 by production volume, and Dongfeng manufactured over 2.76 million whole vehicles that year with passenger cars comprising 73% of manufacture. The number of cars counted as passenger vehicles may conflate consumer offerings and tiny commercial trucks and vans known as microvans, however.

Dongfeng established its first research and development facility outside of China in October 2012 when it acquired a 70 percent stake in the Swedish engineering company T Engineering AB.

In December 2013, Dongfeng and the French automaker Renault agreed to form a 50:50 joint venture, Dongfeng Renault Automotive Co Ltd., to manufacture Renault brand passenger cars for the Chinese market. The two partners agreed to invest an initial 7.76 billion yuan (US$1.27 billion) in the venture, which became Dongfeng's sixth joint venture with a foreign automaker—the most of any Chinese automaker.

In February 2014, loss making PSA Peugeot Citroën, a joint venture partner of Dongfeng since 1992, was recapitalized, with Dongfeng Motor Group taking a 14% stake.

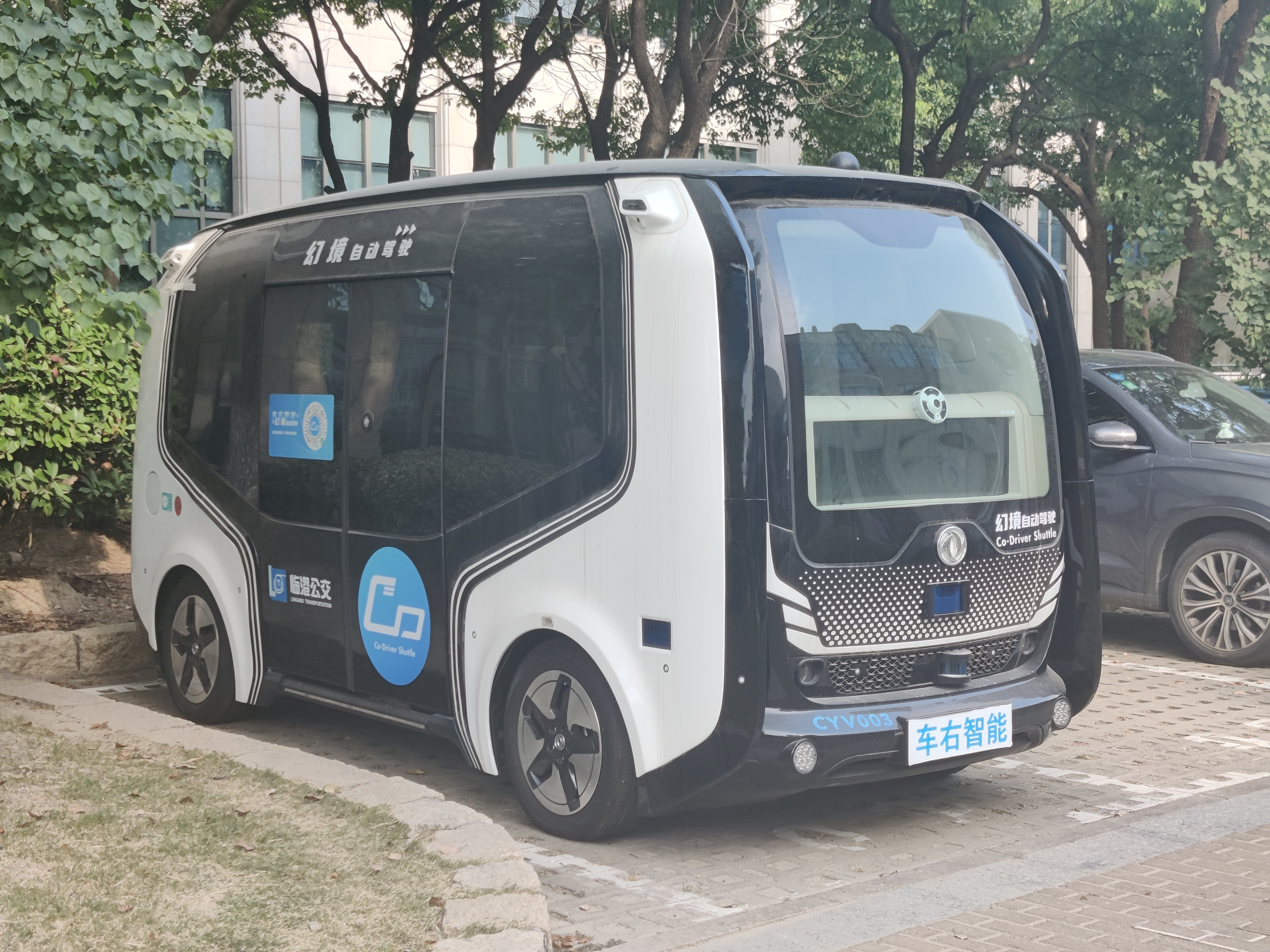
Dongfeng Sharing-VAN

In 2017, it was announced that Dongfeng Motor Corporation would be re-incorporated as a limited company, renaming to 东风汽车集团有限公司, which only differ from its subsidiary Dongfeng Motor Group for the word 股份) (share).

In 2020, Dongfeng dissolved its ventures Dongfeng Renault, Dongfeng Yulon and withdrawn from Dongfeng Yueda Kia in 2021.

On June 12, 2020, the mass-produced version of the Dongfeng Sharing-VAN 1.0 rolled off the production line at its technical center, demonstrating Dongfeng's 5G-enabled autonomous vehicle with level 4 applications.

On 17 July 2020, Dongfeng Motor Corporation introduced Voyah and its brand logo at the Big House Contemporary Art Center in Wuhan. The Voyah brand was launched in September 2020 during the 2020 Beijing Auto Show alongside the i-Free and i-Land concepts.

On 18 December 2020, Voyah's launched its first model, the Free mid-size crossover SUV, which is available with an extended range or pure electric powertrain.

In 2023, construction of the Dongfeng Motor Museum started.

In July 2025, Dongfeng Motor and Nissan announced the establishment of a joint venture at the ratio of 60% and 40%, to export vehicles and components manufactured by Dongfeng Nissan.

In November 2025, Nissan Import & Export (Guangzhou) Co., Ltd. was established. This company is the first joint venture vehicle import and export entity set up by a foreign-funded automotive company in China. The Dongfeng Nissan N7 and Frontier Pro PHEV will be the first models developed locally in China for export to overseas markets.

=== Collaboration with Huawei ===
In March 2024, Yu Chendong, the CEO of Huawei Intelligent Automotive Solution, revealed that M-Hero and Voyah would apply the "Huawei Inside" mode for several of their new models.

In November 2024, Dongfeng Nissan and Huawei signed an agreement of cooperation that they would develop the vehicle based on Huawei's Harmony Cockpit under the Huawei Inside (HI) mode. It is the first sino-foreign joint venture to collaborate with Huawei.

In September 2025, Dongfeng Motor Group announced that Dongfeng Motor Group (DFM), Dongfeng Motor Limited (DFL, a joint venture with Nissan), Xiangyang Holdings, and Xianggao Investment (state-owned companies of Xiangyang city) signed an investment agreement to establish a joint venture. The registered capital of the joint venture is RMB 8.47 billion. Dongfeng Motor Group (DFM). and Dongfeng Motor Limited (DFL) contributed RMB 3.55 billion and RMB 920 million in the form of intangible asset usage rights and physical assets, accounting for approximately 41.9% and 10.9% of the registered capital respectively. Xiangyang Holdings and Xianggao Investment contributed RMB 2.88 billion and RMB 1.12 billion in cash, representing 34% and 13.2% of the registered capital respectively.

The new company will collaborate with Huawei, sharing the M-Hero brand to develop lightweight offroad SUVs. It will be integrated into Huawei's IPD (Integrated Product Development) and IPMS (Integrated Product Marketing and Sales) systems. Dongfeng and Huawei will engage in comprehensive management collaboration across areas such as development, marketing and sales, a new management model leads by Yinwang under the new HI Plus Mode.

In November 2025, Dongfeng Motor and Huawei officially launched the Yijing brand (Chinese: 奕境). Its Western name is Epicland. Its first model, the Epicland X9, which was unveiled on 20 April 2026 by showcasing the side profile and dimensions. The Epicland X9 is expected to debut in April 23 at the Huawei Qiankun Ecosystem Technology Conference.

=== Collaboration with Stellantis ===
On May 15, 2026, Dongfeng Motor and Stellantis signed a strategic cooperation agreement with a total investment exceeding 8 billion RMB, planning to produce new energy vehicles for the Peugeot and Jeep brands at the Dongfeng Peugeot-Citroën (DPCA) Wuhan plant starting in 2027 with two off-road vehicle models under the Jeep brand will be first introduced targeting at the global market. Under this investment, Stellantis will contribute 130 million euros. Five other local state-owned capital entities, including Changjiang Industry Investment Group, Wuhan Financial Holdings Group, and Wuhan Economic Development Industrial Investment Group, accounting for 87% of total investment, have also participated in the funding, . Exporting through the channels of Stellantis' brands could alleviate pressure from trade barriers and discriminatory tariff policies targeting Chinese brands in the European and North American markets.

On May 20, 2026, Stellantis and Dongfeng announce the plan to establish a Europe-based and Stellantis-led 51/49 joint venture for the sales and distribution of Dongfeng's Voyah-branded vehicles in designated markets in Europe. The joint venture also plans to localize Dongfeng new energy vehicles models in the Rennes plant in France.

== Organizational structure ==
=== Dongfeng Motor Corporation (DFM) ===
Dongfeng Motor Corporation (DFM) is the ultimate parent company using the Dongfeng name and is directly controlled by the State-owned Assets Supervision and Administration Commission of the State Council.

=== Dongfeng Motor Group (DFG) ===
Dongfeng Motor Group (DFG) is a listed subsidiary that is majority owned (66.86%) by Dongfeng Motor Corporation. The Dongfeng Motor Group (DFG) subsidiary is responsible for several joint ventures with foreign car companies, such as Dongfeng Motor Company Limited (DFL or commonly known as Dongfeng Nissan), Dongfeng Honda Automobile, Dongfeng Peugeot-Citroën Automobile.

Of the joint ventures, DFL (or Dongfeng Nissan), formed in 2003, is the largest and sells Nissan-branded vehicles under its Dongfeng Nissan Passenger Vehicle Company (DFN) division. The DFN division also produces cars using Infiniti and Venucia branding. In 2017, DFL acquired 51% stake in Zhengzhou Nissan (total 79.651%) from its own subsidiary (at the time) Dongfeng Automobile Company Ltd. (DFAC) to consolidate Nissan China operations under DFL.

=== Dongfeng Commercial Vehicle (DFCV) ===
Dongfeng Commercial Vehicle (DFCV) is a 55-45 joint venture between Dongfeng Motor Corporation and Volvo which produces medium-heavy trucks under Dongfeng branding. It was formed in 1975 by Dongfeng Motor Corporation, and was transferred to DFL in 2003. In 2013, DFL sold the medium-heavy truck business back to Dongfeng Motor Corporation, who then formed the joint venture with Volvo in 2015.

=== Dongfeng Automobile Company Ltd. (DFAC) ===
Dongfeng Automobile Company Ltd. (DFAC) is a 55% owned listed subsidiary that produces light commercial vehicles under Dongfeng branding. It was formed in 1998 by Dongfeng Motor Corporation, and was transferred to DFL in 2003, who held a 60.1% stake. In 2022, DFL transferred 29.9% stake back to Dongfeng Motor Corporation, who then bought another 25.1% from other investors, obtaining majority stake of 55%, fully streamlining all commercial vehicle production to Dongfeng Motor Corporation direct control. It has a 50-50 joint venture to produce Cummins diesel engines known as Dongfeng Cummins Engine Co. Ltd.

== Leadership ==
- Huicheng Ye (2004–2010)
- Xu Ping (2010–2015)
- Zhu Yanfeng (2015–2023)
- Yang Qing (2023–present)

== Brands ==
Dongfeng sells vehicles under various brand names. Other brands may be associated with products manufactured or assembled by joint-venture companies that see foreign firms cooperate with Dongfeng in order to gain access to the Chinese market.

=== Voyah ===
Voyah (岚图) is a premium EV brand directly under Dongfeng Motor Corporation specializing in designing and developing electric vehicles.

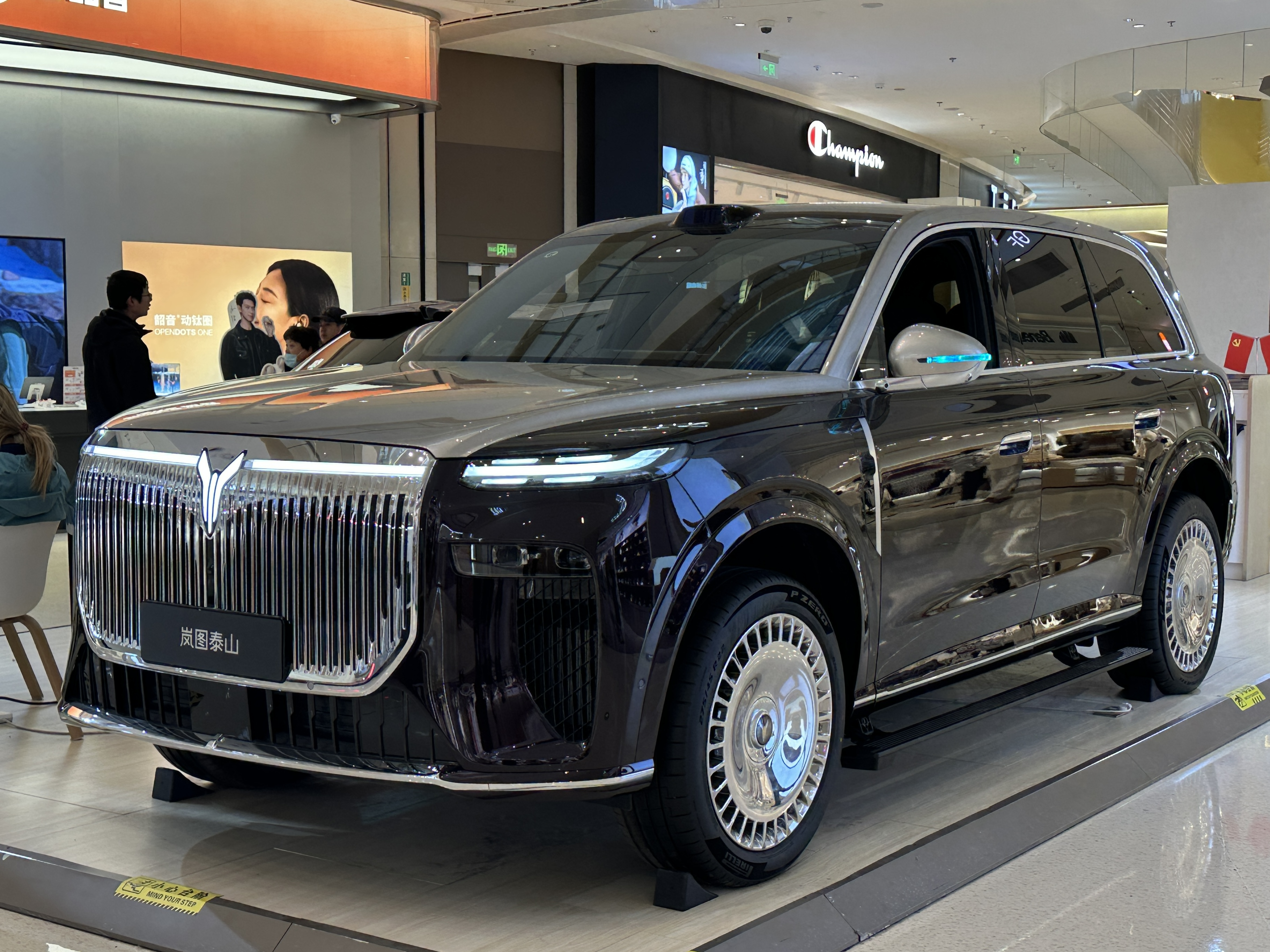
Voyah Taishan

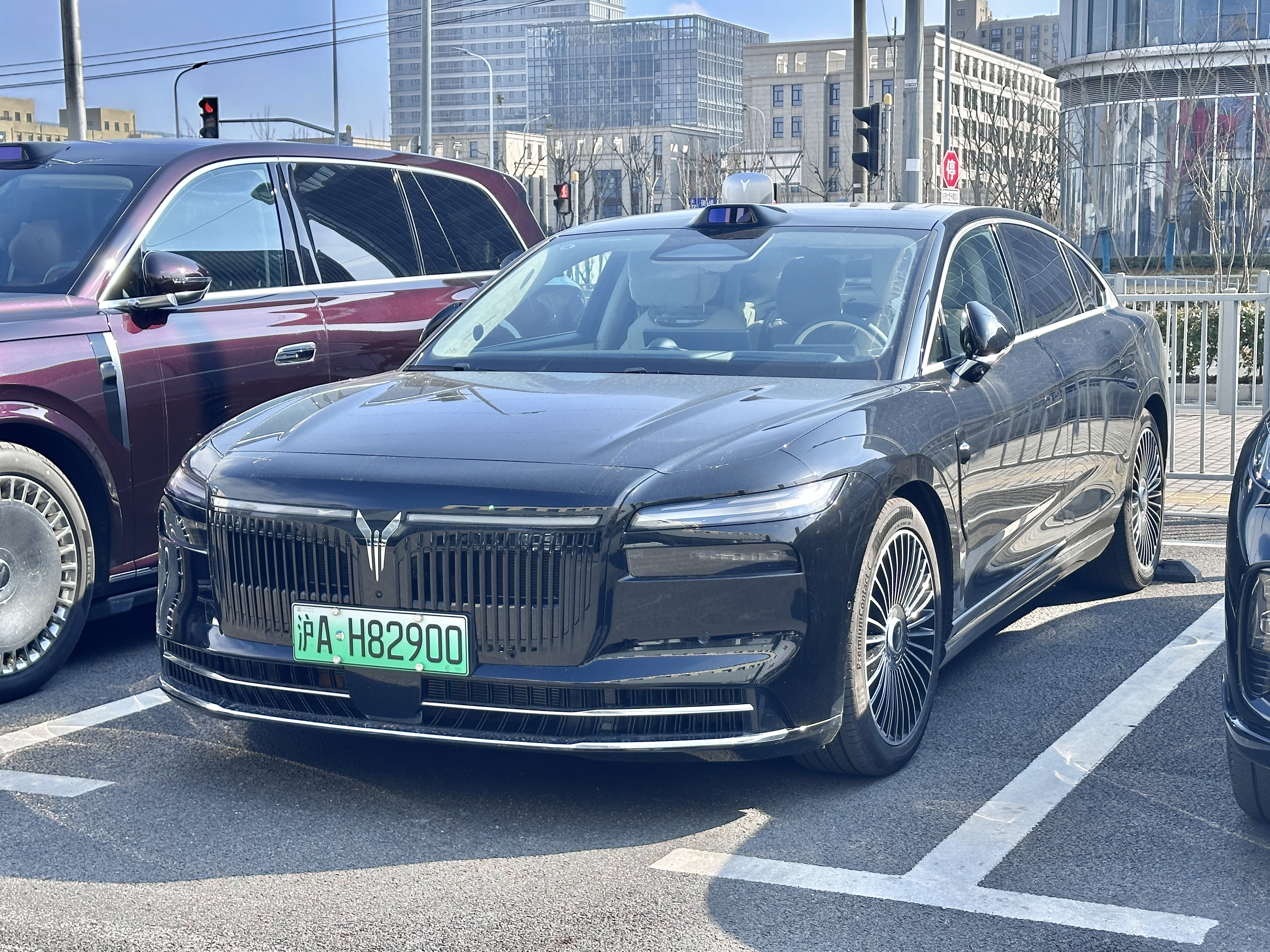
Voyah Passion L

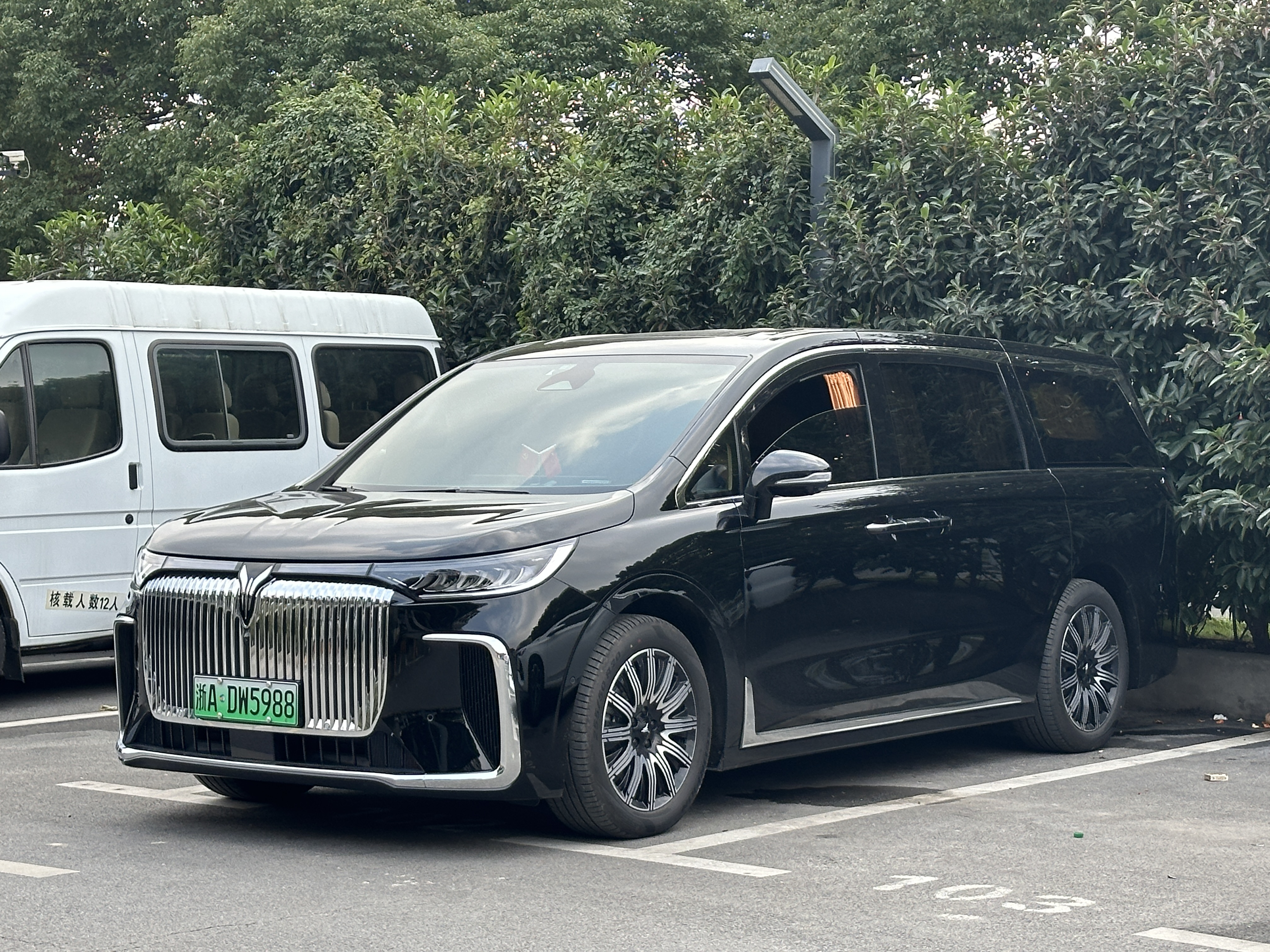
Voyah Dream

=== M-Hero ===
M-Hero Technology (猛士科技) is Dongfeng's brand for high performance luxury off-road vehicle. The Chinese name of the brand Mengshi (猛士) was inherited from the military vehicle line of Dongfeng. In 2023, the brand unveiled its first full-size luxury off-roader M-Hero 917, a high performance EV/ EREV.

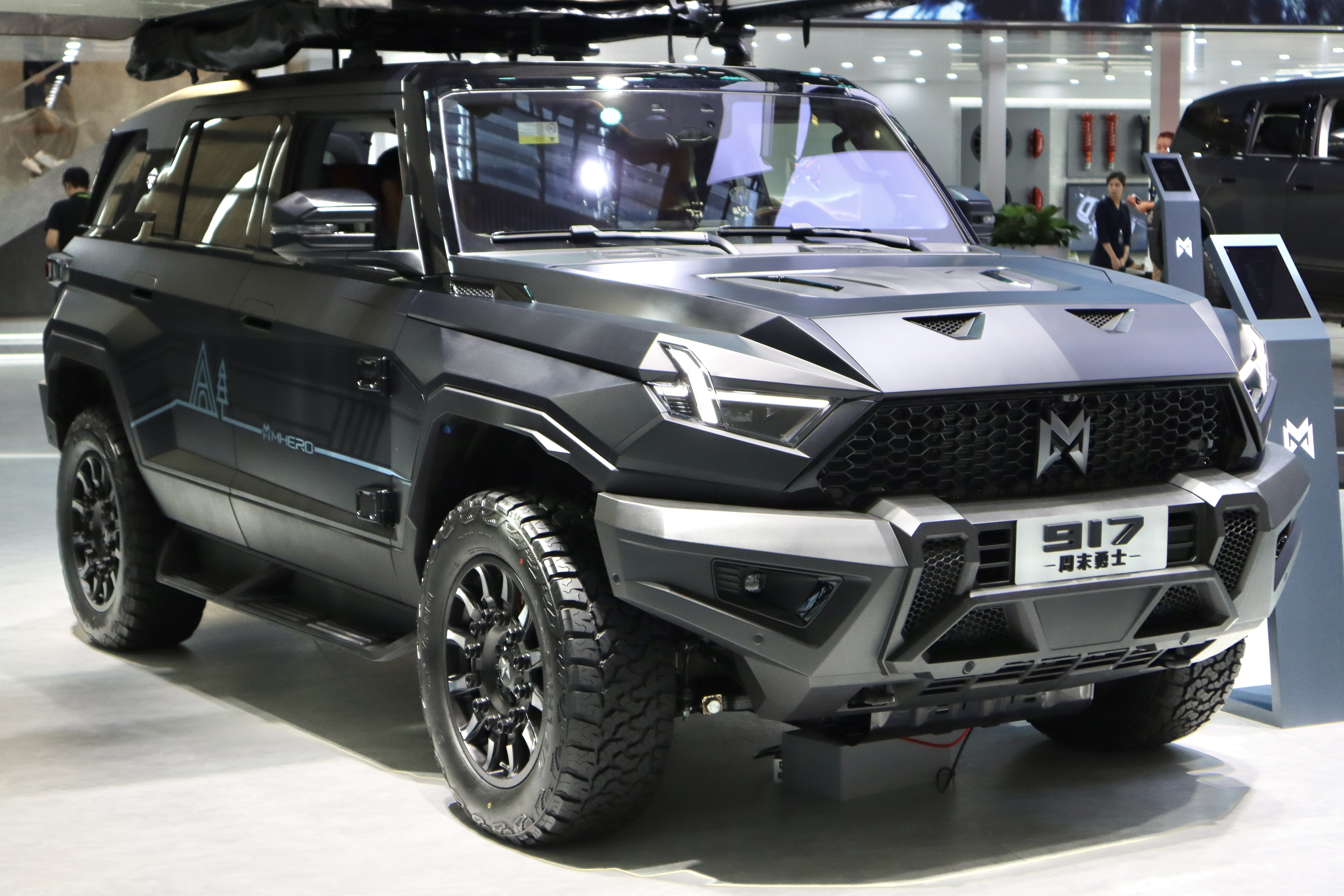
M-Hero 917

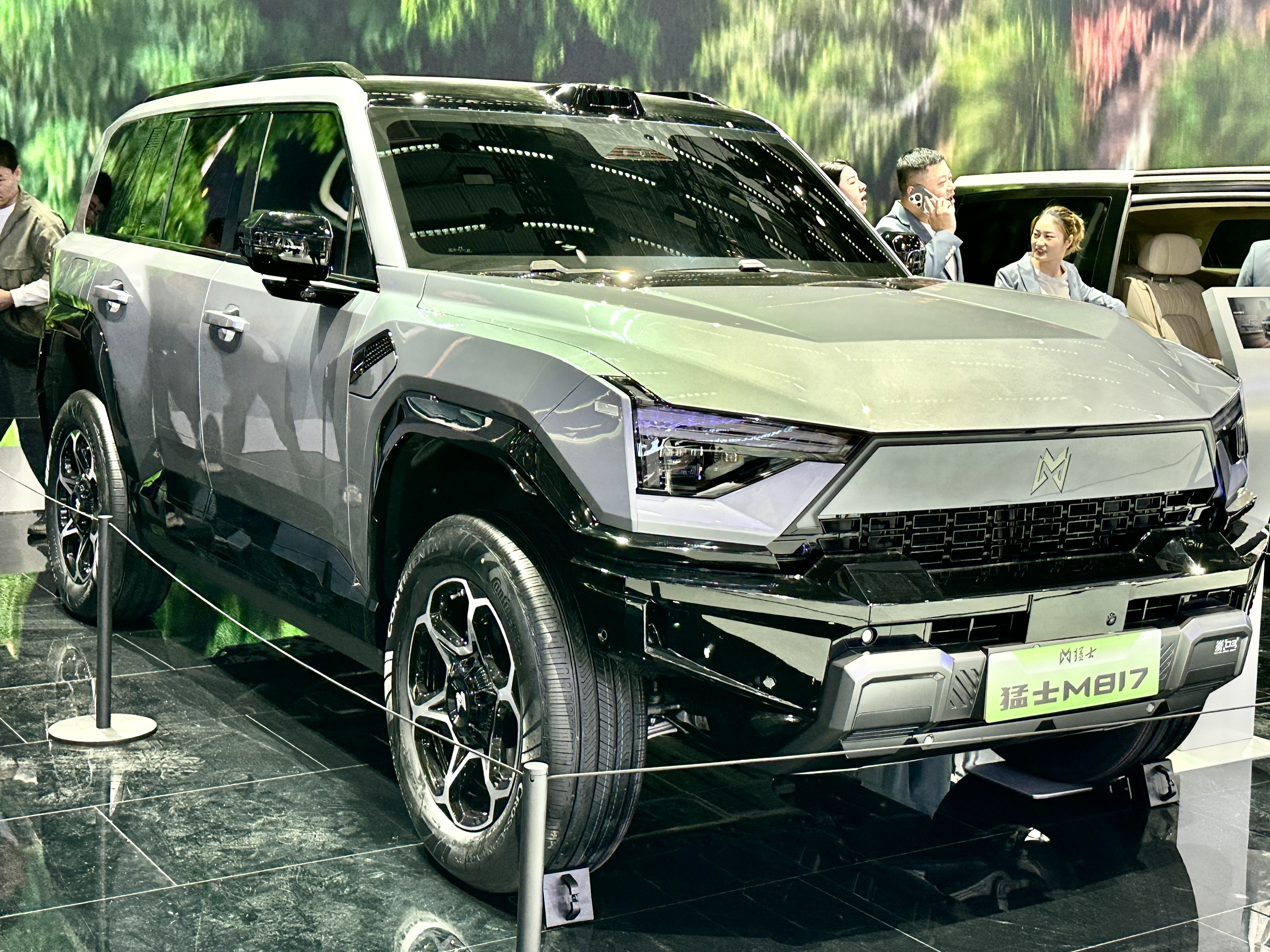
M-Hero M817

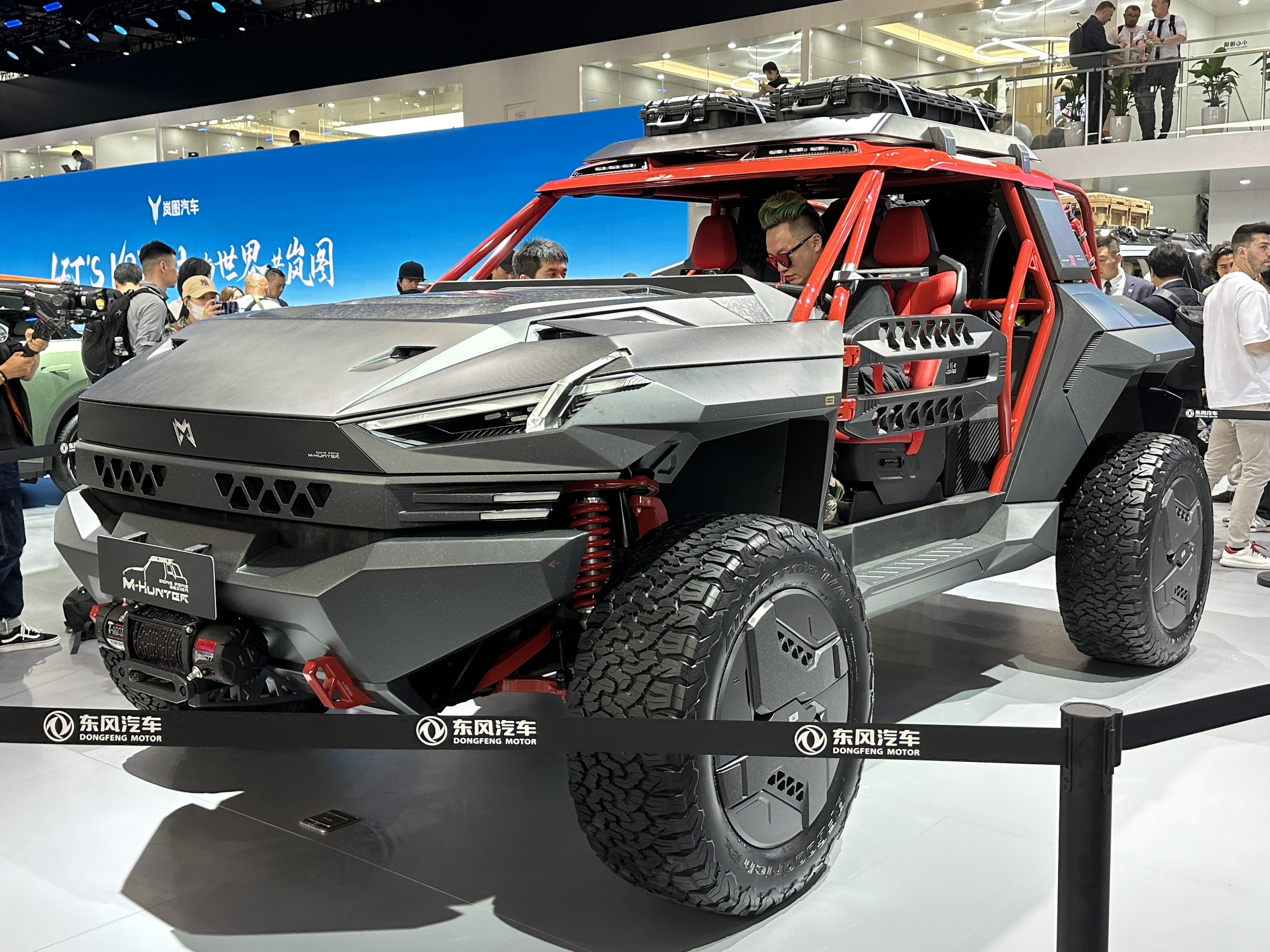
M-Hero M-Hunter

=== Epicland ===
The Epicland or Yijing brand, launched on November 20, 2025. Its first vehicle is the Epicland X9.

=== eπ Technology ===
In August 2023, Dongfeng Motor announced restructure of its subsidiary brands Dongfeng eπ, Aeolus (Dongfeng Fengshen) and Dongfeng Nammi. The three brands were consolidated into one "Dongfeng" brand, which unified in marketing and production management. The three brands became sub-brands and remained using independent marques.

In June 2025, Dongfeng announced to establish the Dongfeng eπ Auto Technology Ltd, to integrate the Aeolus, eπ, and Nammi brands under the new entity. The eπ Technology would possess independent R&D, manufacturing, and sales capabilities.

==== Dongfeng eπ ====
Dongfeng eπ is the premium EV sub-brand under the Dongfeng brand. The first Dongfeng eπ concept car debuted on 2023 Shanghai Auto Show, and its prototype was named as Aeolus eπ01 formerly.

In August 2023, Dongfeng Motor announced the consolidation of One Dongfeng brand. The Dongfeng eπ, Aeolus, and Dongfeng Nammi became sub-brands under Dongfeng brand.

- Dongfeng eπ 007 (2024–present), full-size sedan, BEV/PHEV(EREV)
  - Dongfeng eπ 007 GT (to commence), station wagon variant
  - Dongfeng eπ EP7 (2026–present), Huawei Qiankun variant
- Dongfeng eπ 008 (2024–present), mid-size SUV, BEV/PHEV(EREV)
  - Dongfeng eπ M8 (2026–present), Huawei Qiankun variant
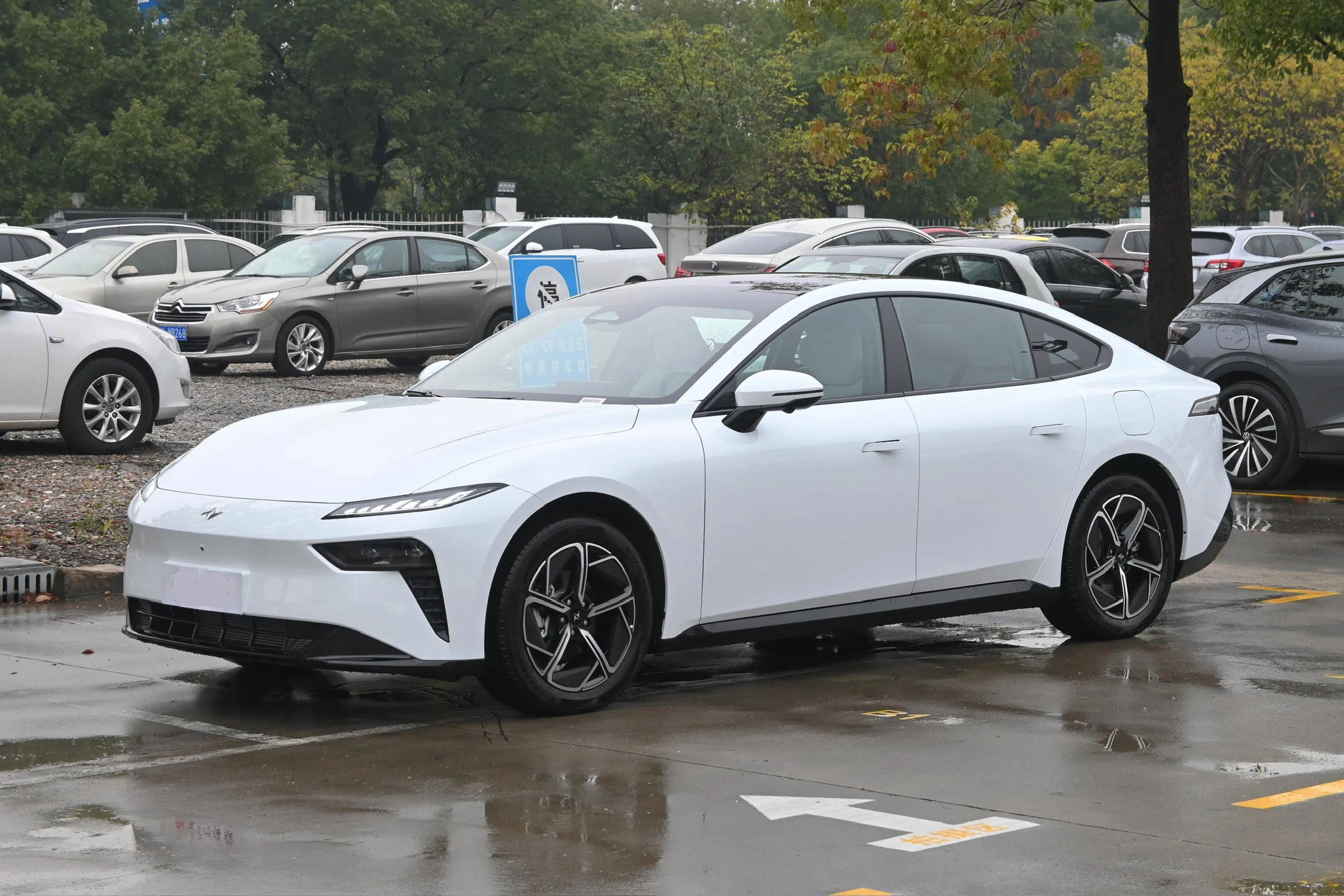
Dongfeng eπ 007

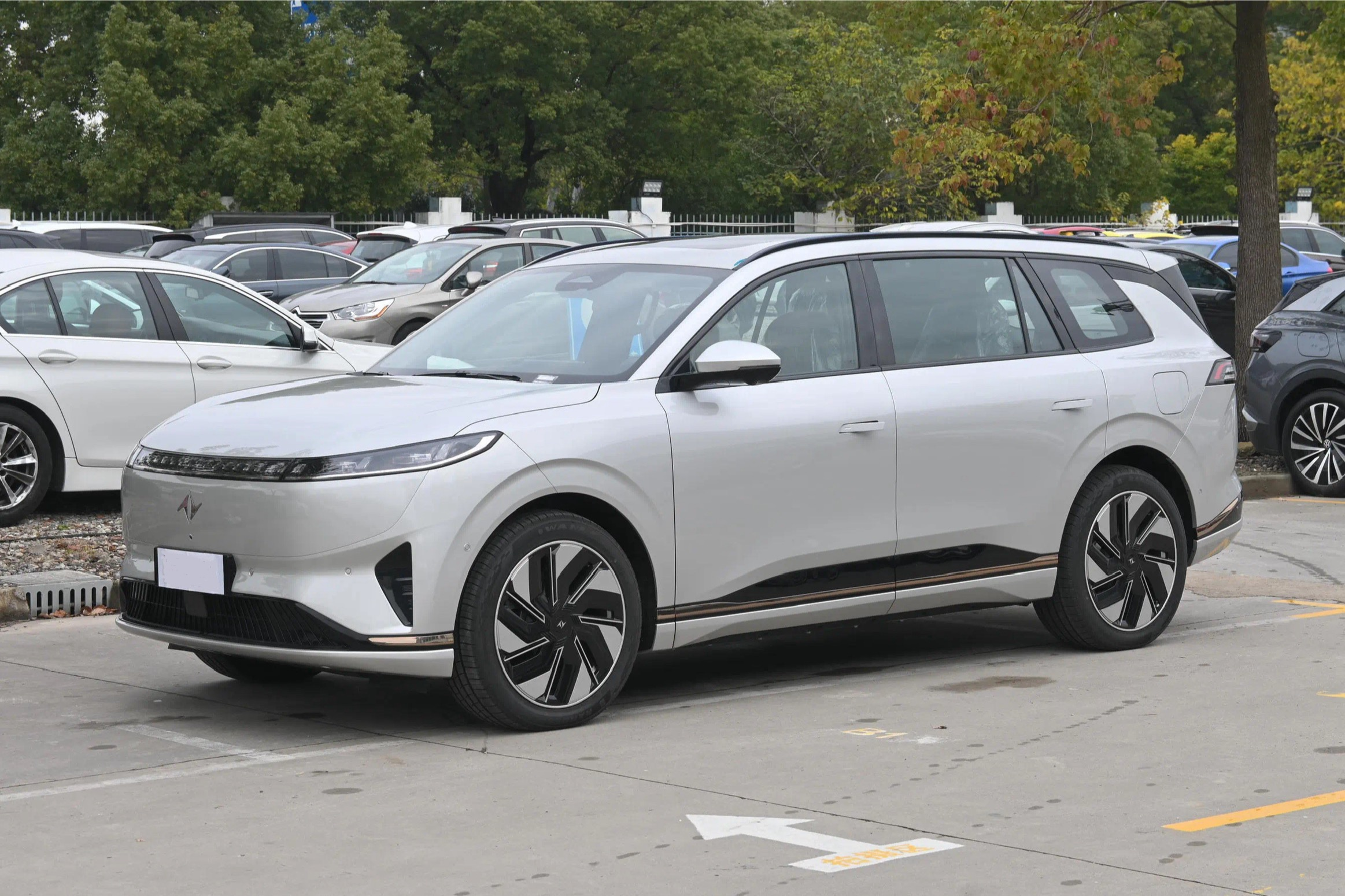
Dongfeng eπ 008

==== Aeolus (Dongfeng Fengshen) ====
Aeolus was launched in July 2009 using the Chinese name Fengshen (风神), and was later renamed to Aeolus as the English name. Several models during the 2010s was produced with support from PSA Peugeot Citroën and in the same factories that produce its Peugeot and Citroën-branded products for the Chinese market. The Aeolus S30 may have been the first instance of Dongfeng using its own "Dual Sparrows" logo in combination with its name.

In August 2023, Aeolus became a sub-brand under one unified Dongfeng brand but remain its independent marque.

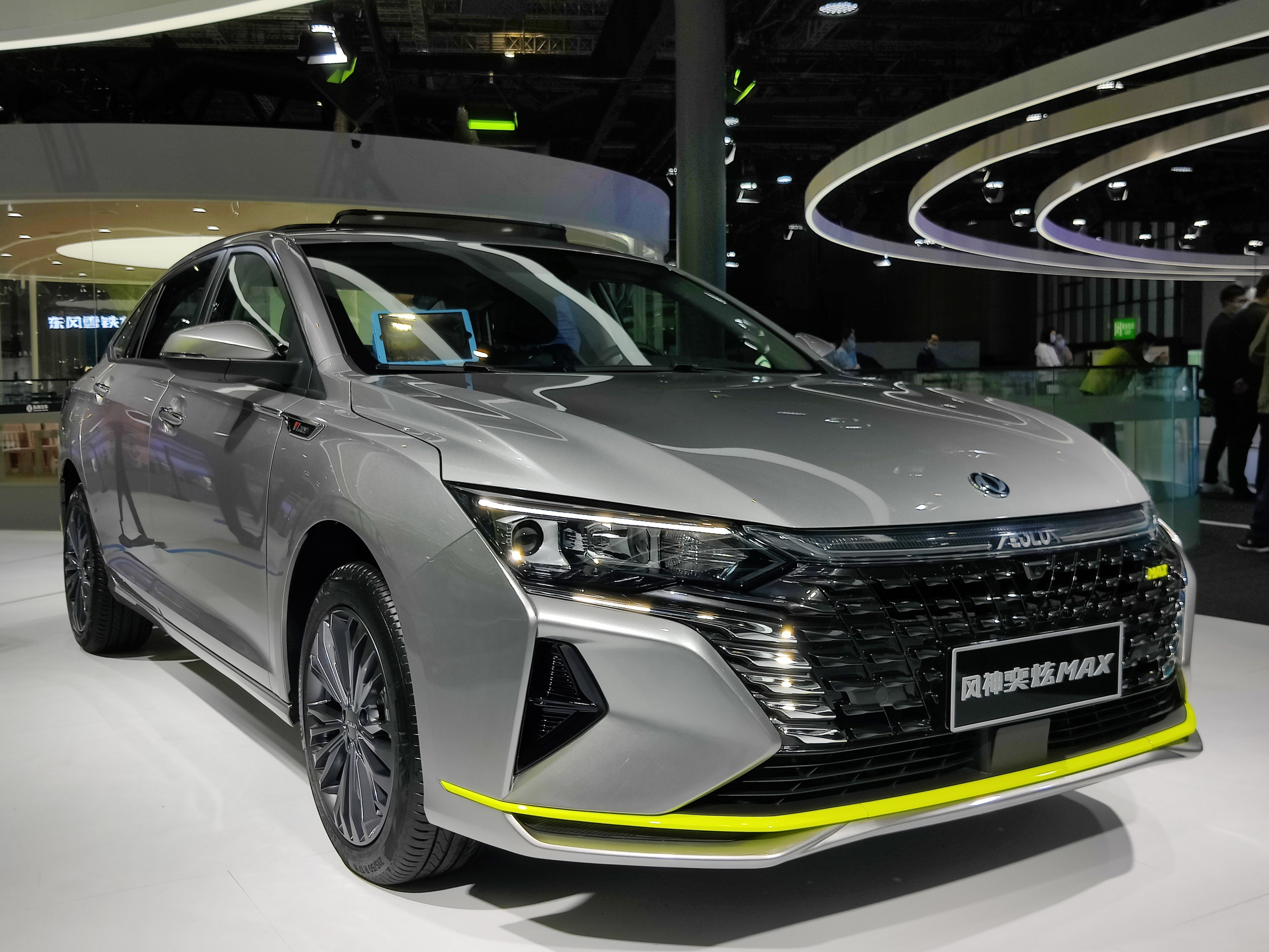
Aeolus Yixuan Max

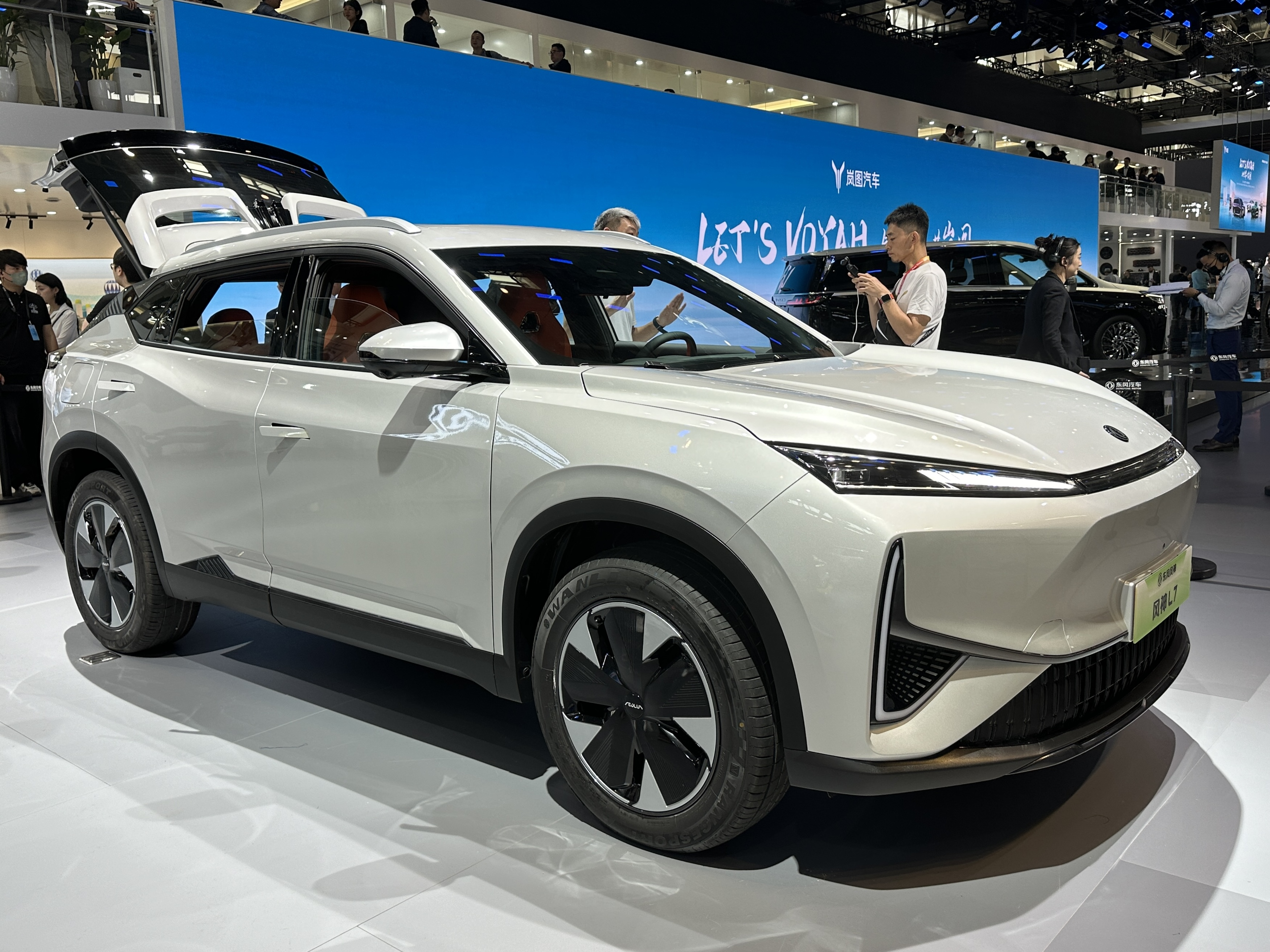
Aeolus L7

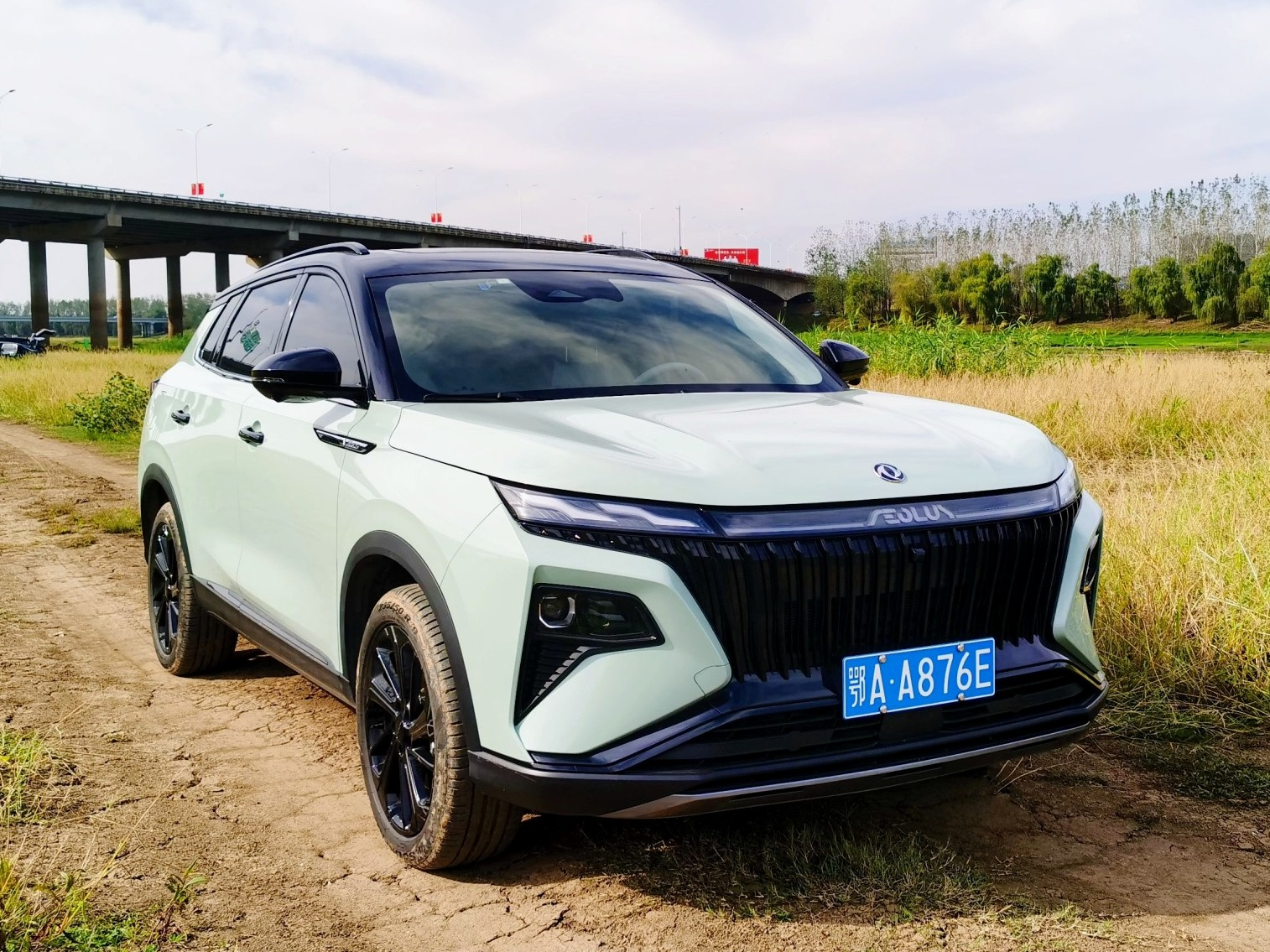
Aeolus Haoji

==== Dongfeng Nammi ====
Dongfeng Nammi (previously known as Dongfeng EV or Dongchuang Zilian) is Dongfeng's brand for budget electric vehicles. The company previously sells the vehicle produced by eGT New Energy Automotive, a joint venture between Dongfeng and Renault-Nissan Alliance in Chinese market. In 2023, it was capital-increased and rename to Dongfeng Nammi, transitioning from a sales company to one with production capabilities.

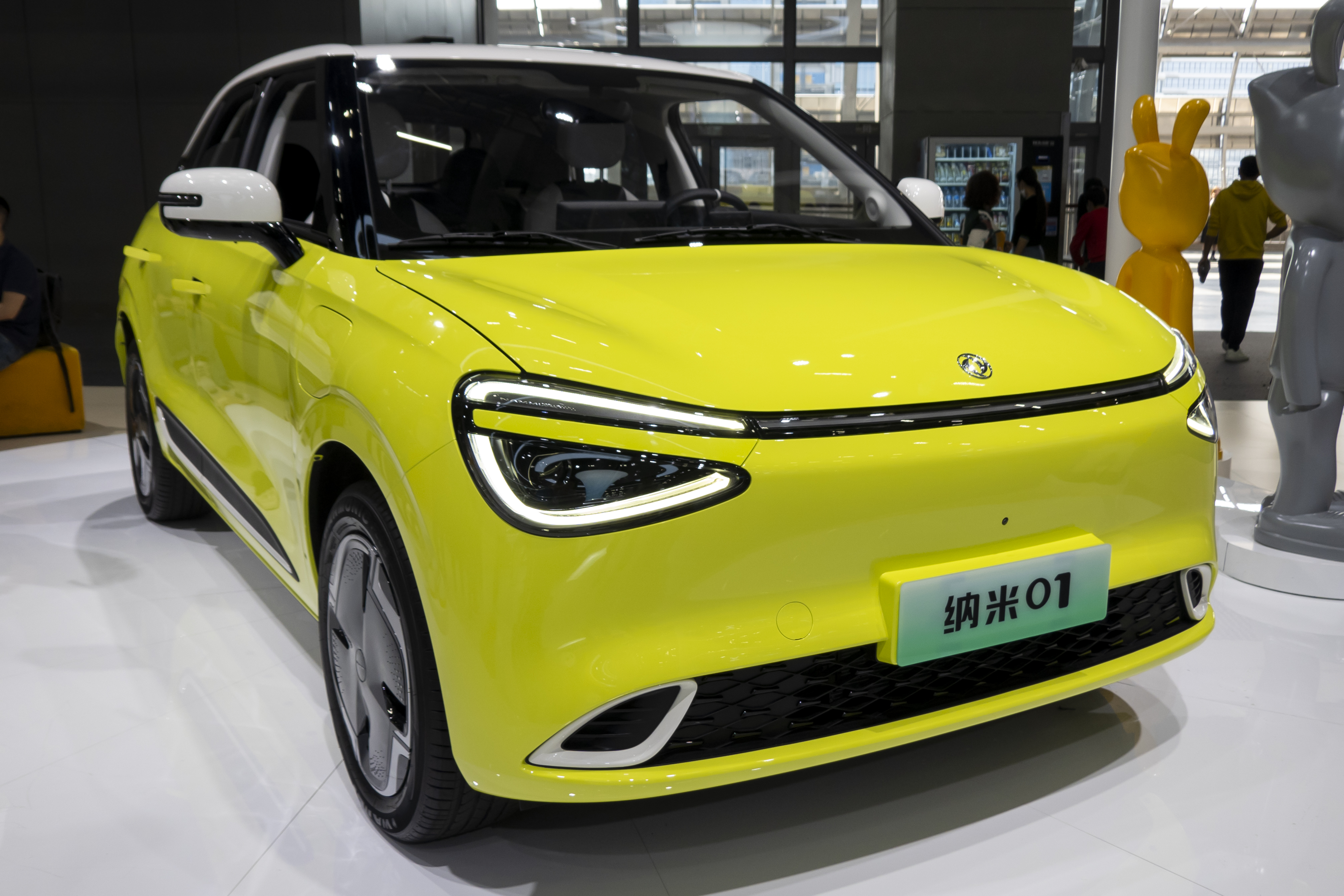
Dongfeng Nammi 01

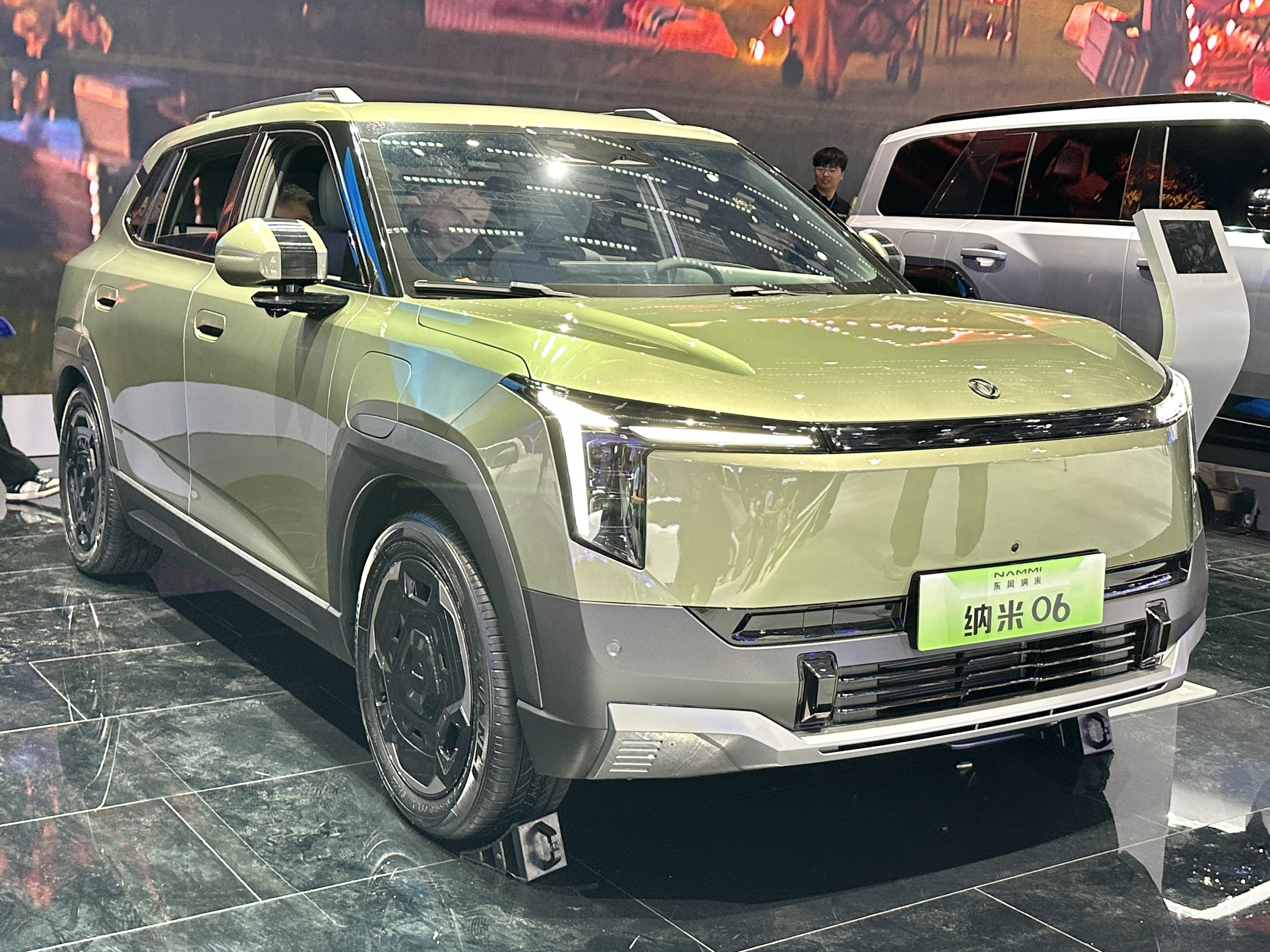
Dongfeng Nammi 06

=== Forthing ===
Dongfeng Liuzhou Motor Co., Ltd. is a subsidiary of Dongfeng Motor Group, located in the city of Liuzhou, Guangxi, China. Passenger vehicles produced by Dongfeng Liuzhou Motor bears the Forthing (Dongfeng Fengxing) brand.

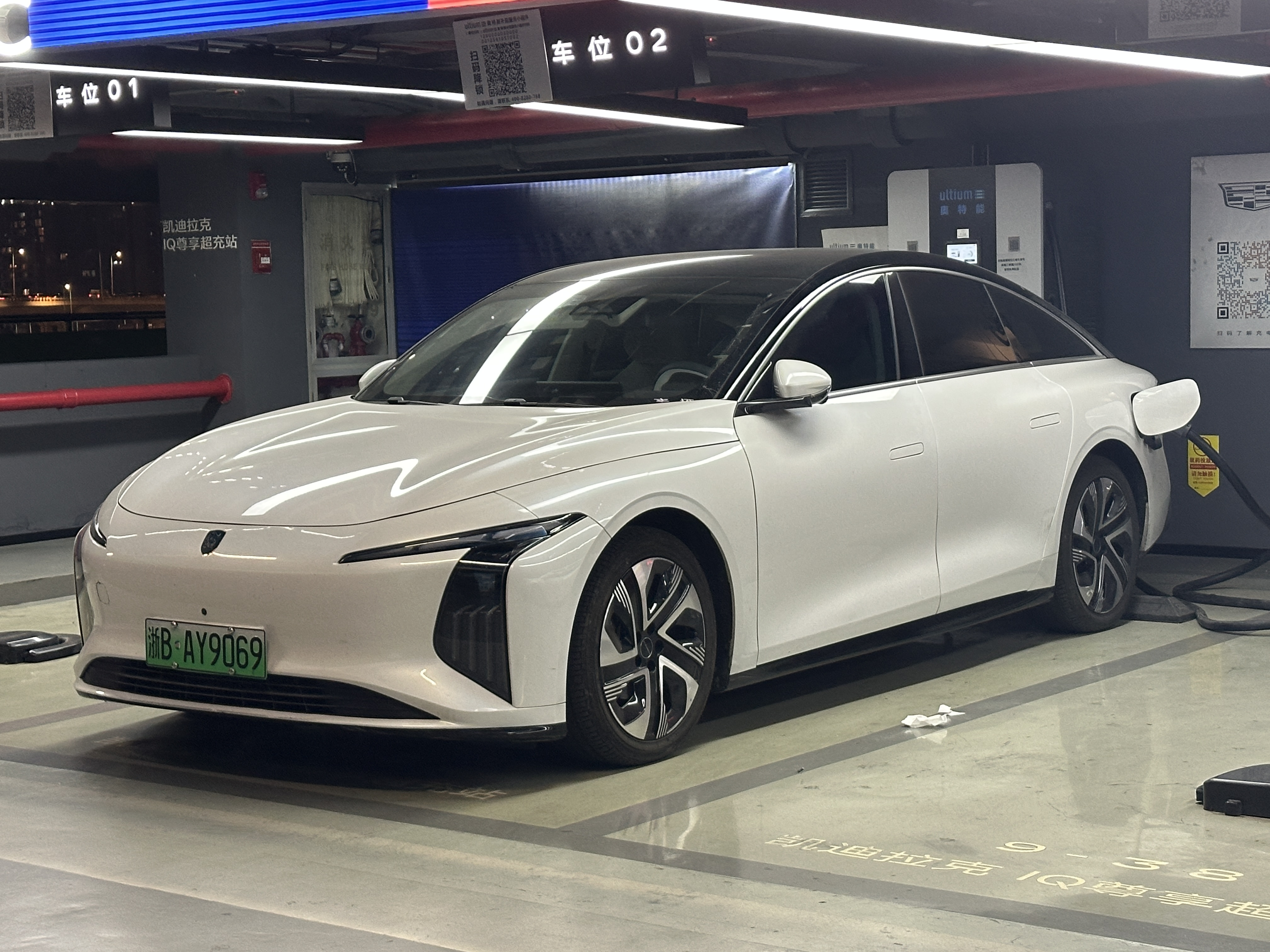
Forthing Xinghai S7

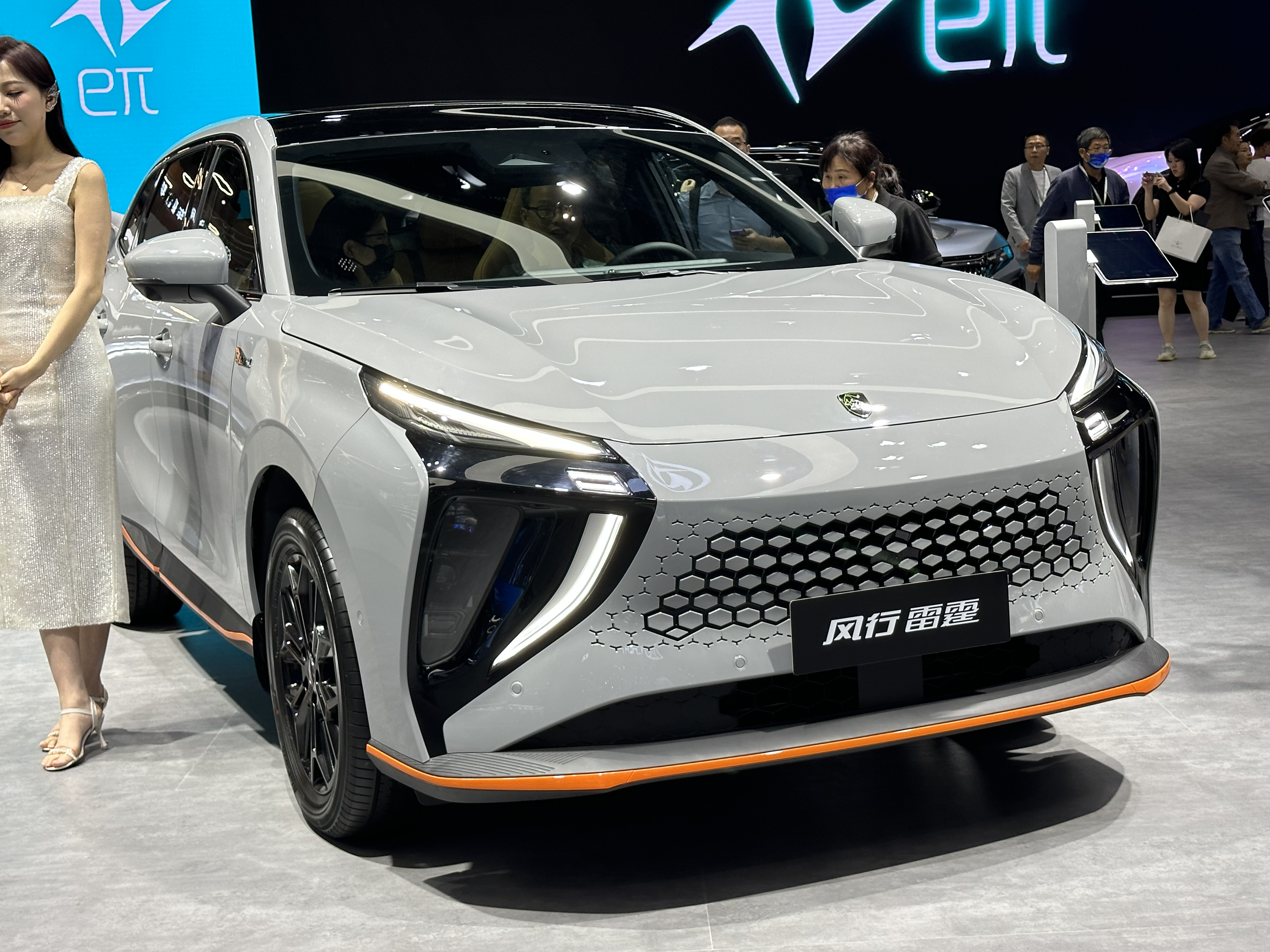
Forthing Leiting

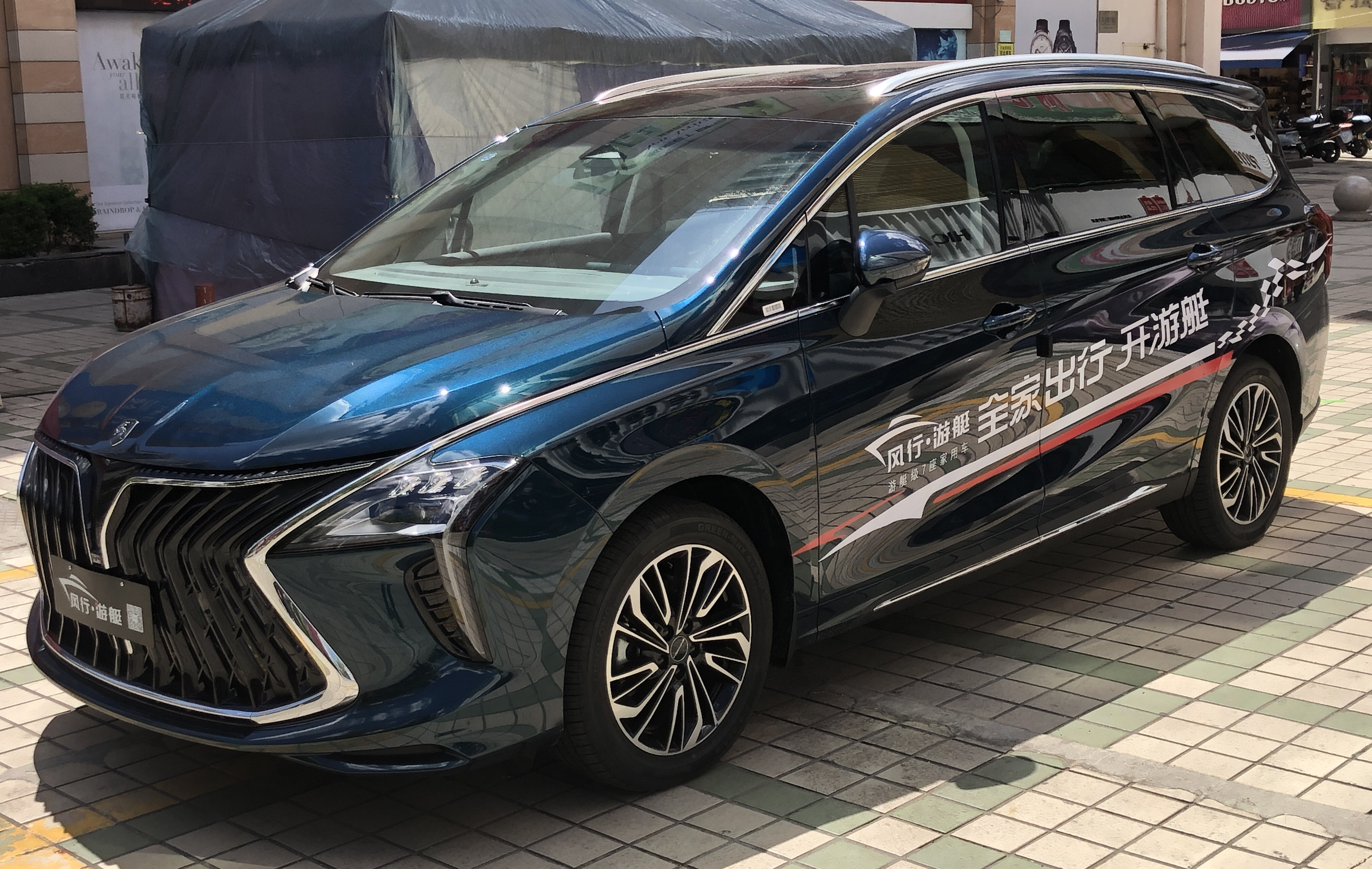
Forthing Yacht

== Joint ventures ==
Dongfeng is the Chinese partner in many joint ventures that make trucks and cars.

=== M-hero Technology (Xiangyang) ===
In September 2025, Dongfeng Motor announced that it, along with the Government of Xiangyang City, and Dongfeng Nissan, signed an investment agreement to establish a joint venture called M-Hero Automotive Technology (Xiangyang). The local state-owned enterprises of Xiangyang hold a 47.2% stake, DFM holds a 41.9% stake, Dongfeng Nissan holds a 10.9% stake. The company will collaborate with Huawei, sharing the M-Hero brand with M-Hero Technology, to develop lightweight off-road SUVs led by Yinwang under the new HI Plus Mode.

=== eGT New Energy Automotive ===
On August 29, 2017, the Renault-Nissan Alliance and Dongfeng Motor Corporation announced the establishment of a joint venture, eGT New Energy Automotive Co., Ltd. This joint venture was created for the collaborative development and sale of electric vehicles in China. Renault and Nissan each hold a 25% stake in eGT, while Dongfeng owns the remaining 50% of the shares. eGT has established its production facility in Shiyan City, Hubei Province, located in the central region of China.

The joint venture shares the production line and supply chain with Dongfeng Nammi and produces the electric city car targeted at European market. Its main products, the Renault Group's Renault City K-ZE/ Dacia Spring, Seres Group's Fengon E1 and Nissan's Vanucia E30 (second generation) are rebadged by Dongfeng's Nano Box and EX1 city car.

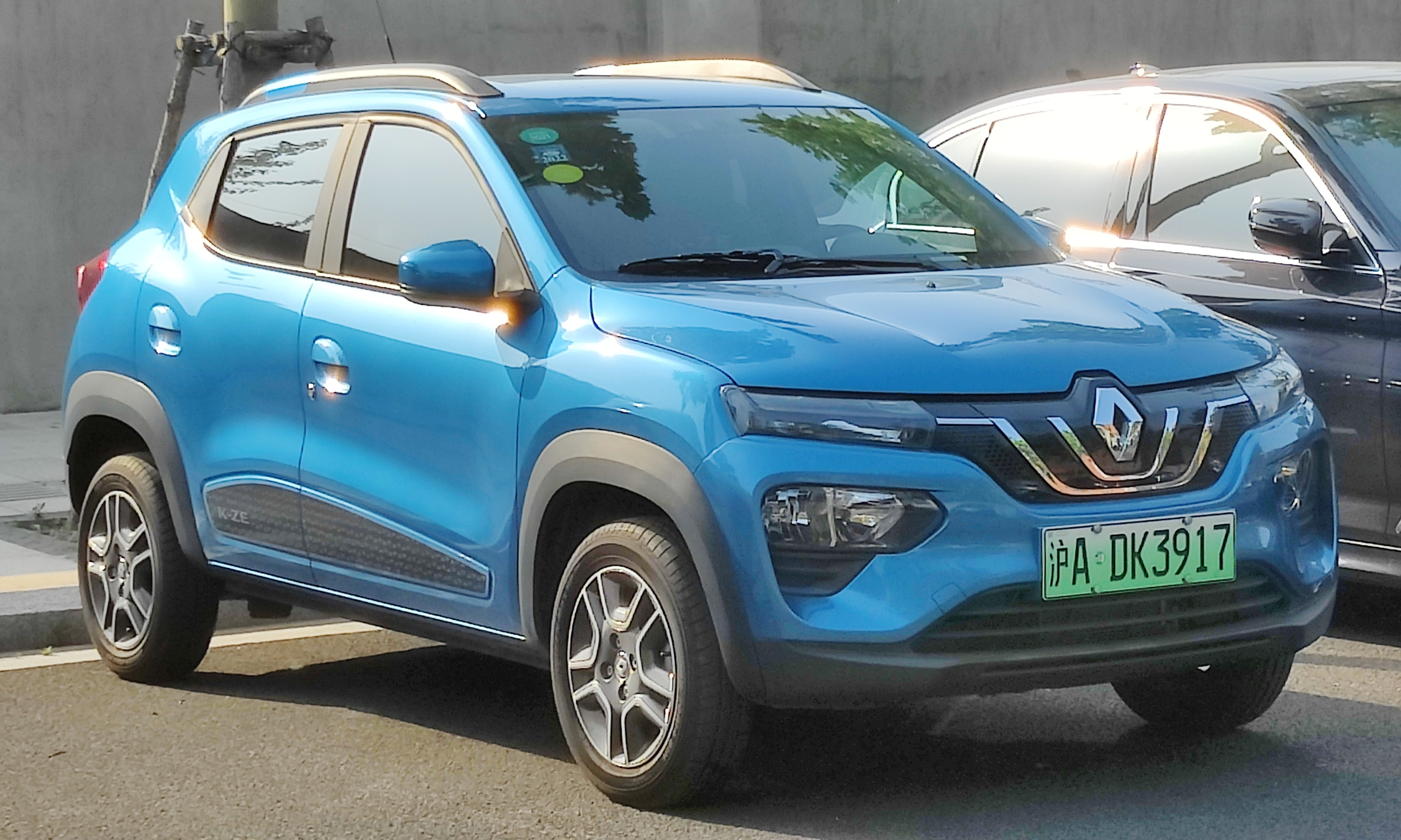
Renault City K-ZE

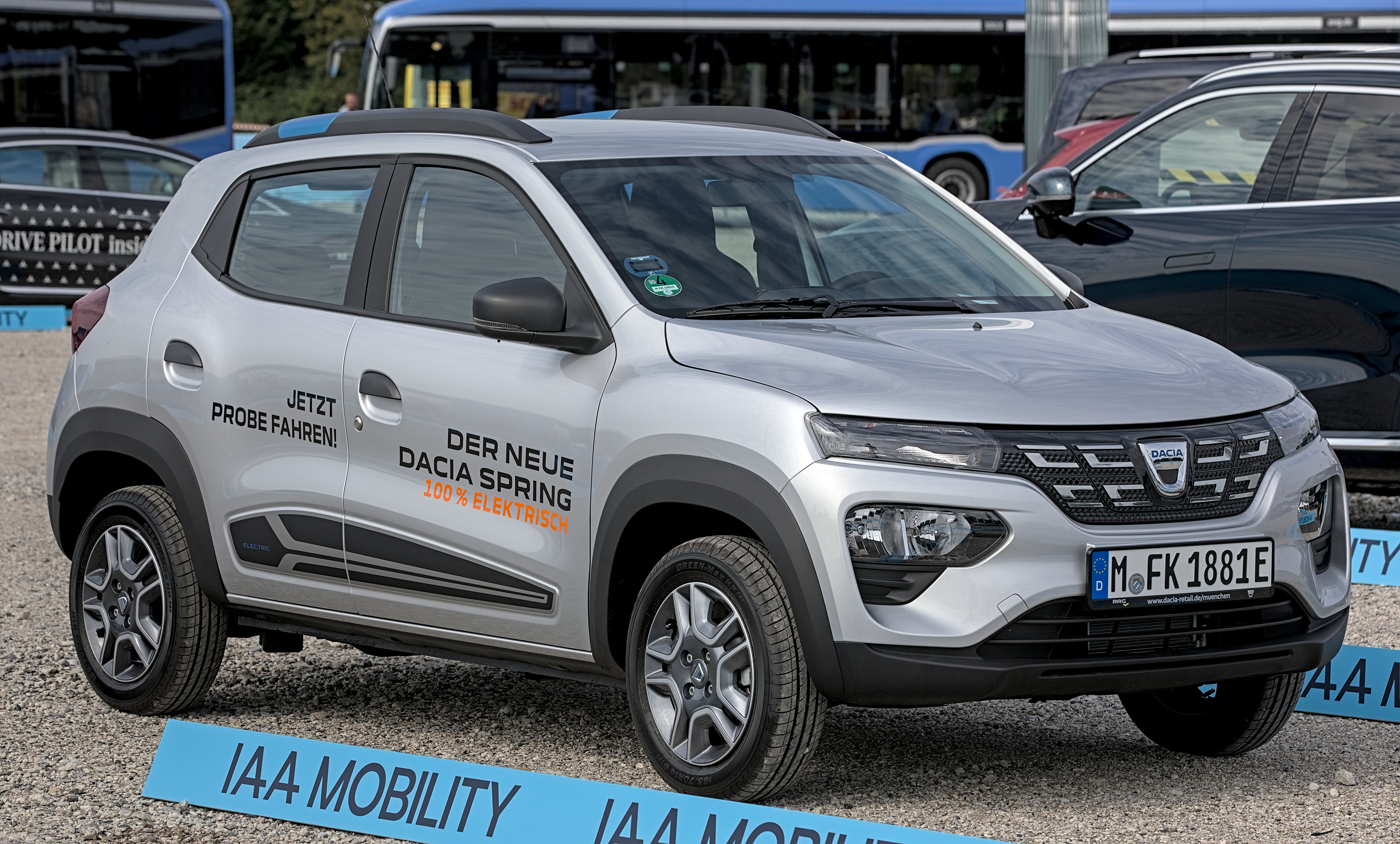
Dacia Spring

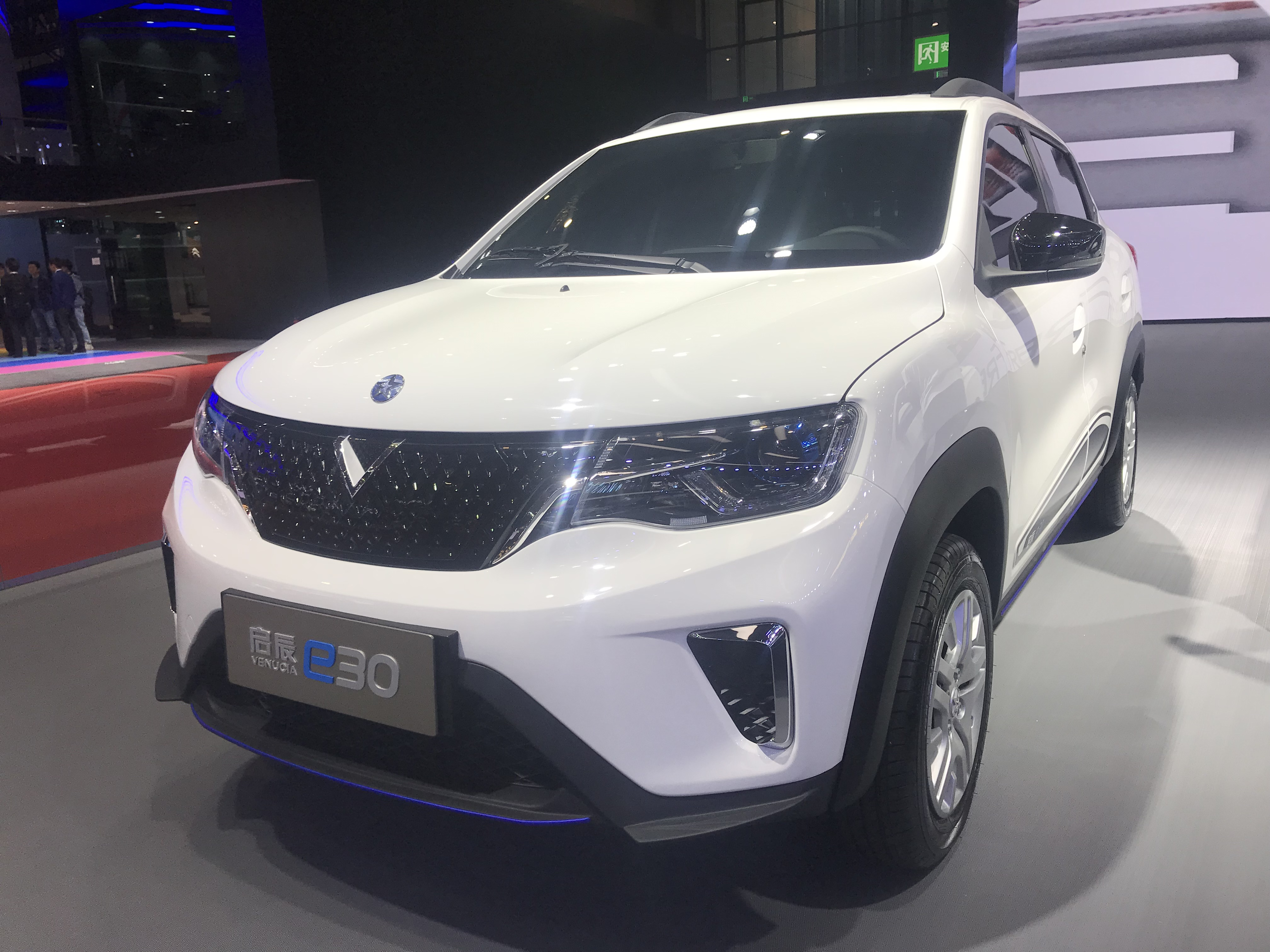
Venucia e30

=== Dana ===
Dongfeng established its joint venture with American parts-maker Dana Holding Corporation, Dongfeng Dana Axle Co, c. 2005. As of 2011, Dana and Dongfeng both have 50% ownership of this joint venture.

=== Dongfeng Commercial Vehicles (Dongfeng Trucks) ===
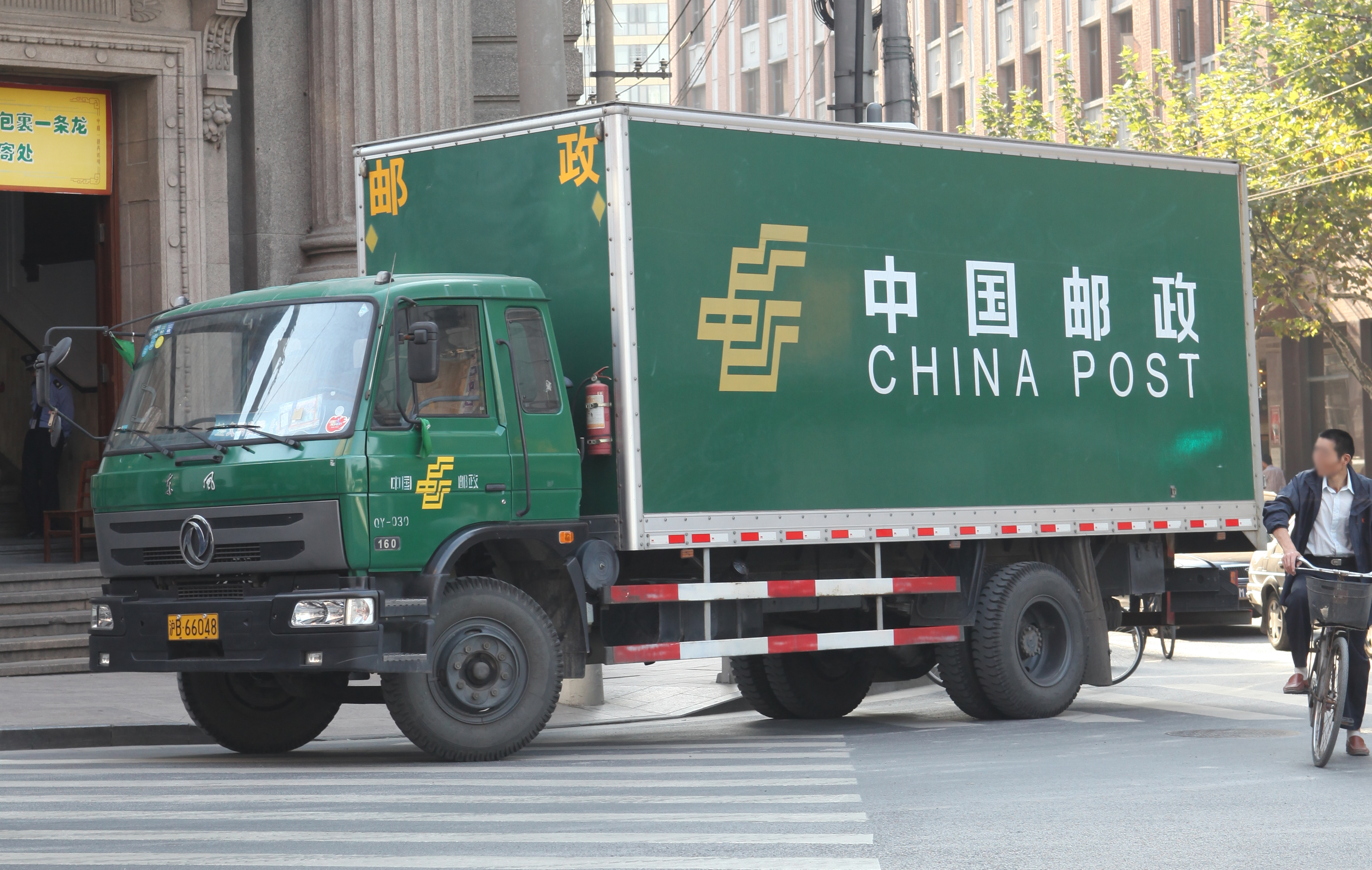
A Dongfeng truck

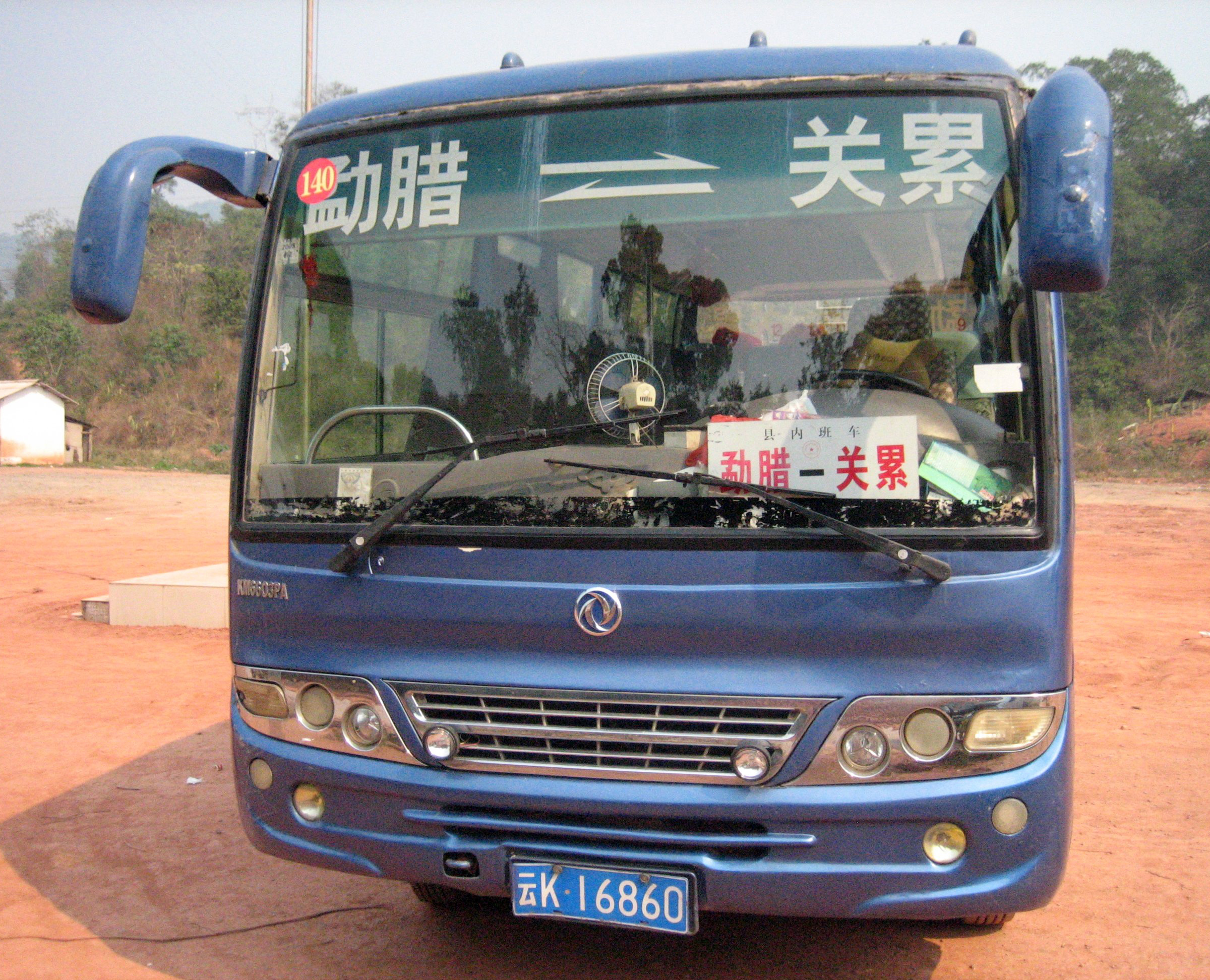
A Dongfeng KM6603PA bus

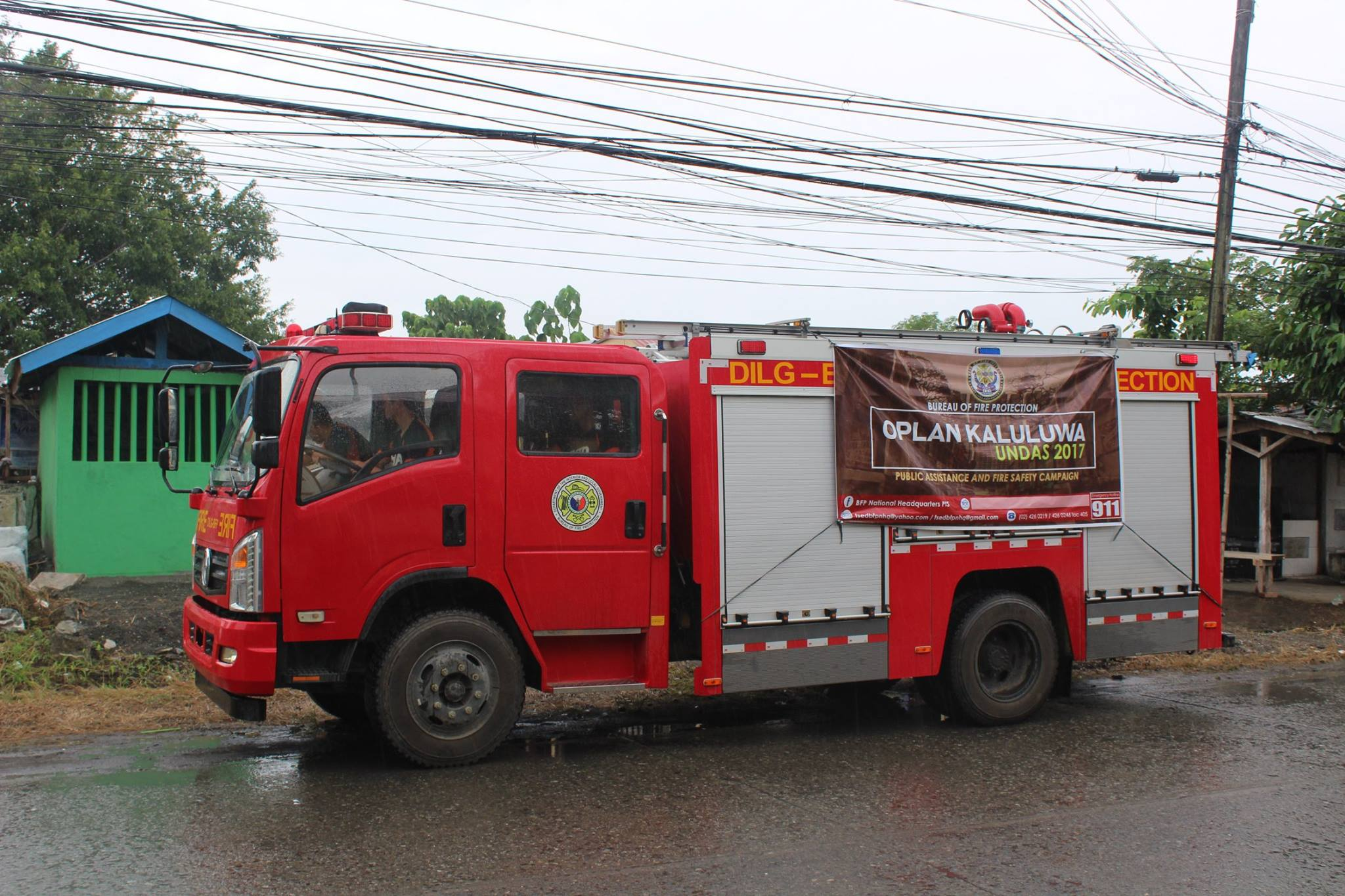
Dongfeng Hubei 4x2 fire engine in the Philippines

In January 2013, Dongfeng and Volvo agreed to form a China-based medium- and heavy-duty truck manufacturing joint venture, Dongfeng Commercial Vehicles, with 55% ownership by Dongfeng Motor and 45% by Volvo. As part of the transaction, Volvo will pay 5.6 billion yuan (US$900 million) to Dongfeng, which will pay Nissan Motors to replace it with Volvo in an existing commercial vehicle joint venture. It is unclear if the vehicles produced will be sold under the Volvo brand as a smaller, pre-existing Volvo-Dongfeng joint venture markets and assembles products with a "UD" brand and the Dongfeng brand name is traditionally used on commercial vehicles.

A Nissan joint venture engine production base in Shiyan, Hubei province, was producing diesel engines c. 2010, and it is possible this location was one asset of the former Nissan joint venture Dongfeng bought out as part of the Volvo deal.

The company uses the Dongfeng Trucks brand.

=== Dongfeng Honda ===
Based in Wuhan, Hubei province, Dongfeng Honda Automobile Company was established in 2003 and manufactures Honda-branded SUVs and automobiles for the Chinese market. Products produced by this joint venture with Honda include the Honda Civic, the CR-V, and the Spirior. As of early 2011, some offerings may incorporate Japanese-made parts.

In 2010, its model line included what was China's best-selling SUV that year, the CR-V. Other Honda-branded models sold in China are made by Guangqi Honda Automobile, but a 2004 agreement allowed Dongfeng-built CR-Vs to be sold through Guangqi's showrooms.

A China-only product line debuted in 2016 with the Gienia, a mid-size hatchback.

Primary production may be at its two Wuhan, Hubei, production sites, one of which became operational c. 2012. Another plant produces engines for this joint venture in Guangzhou.

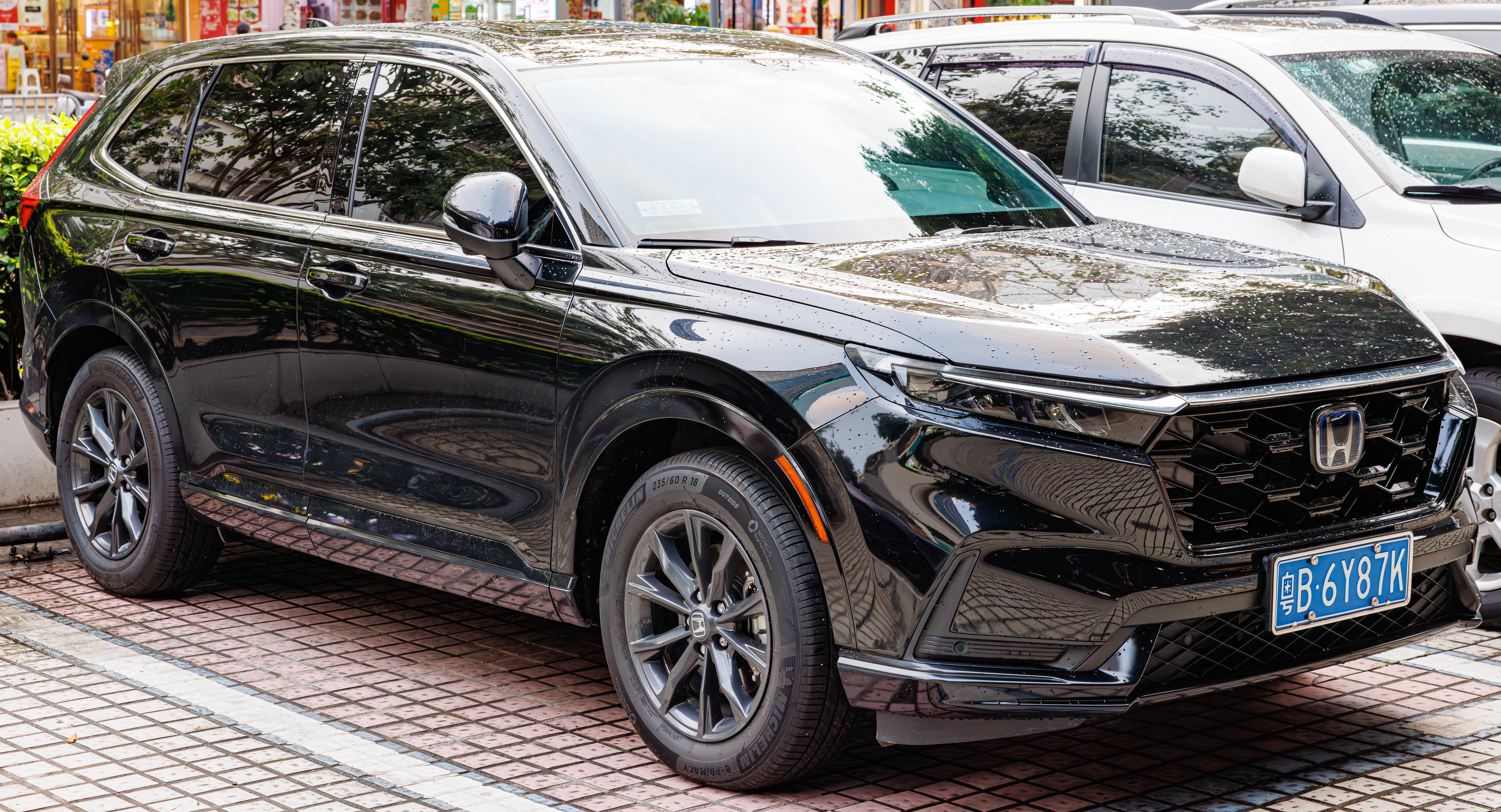
Honda CR-V

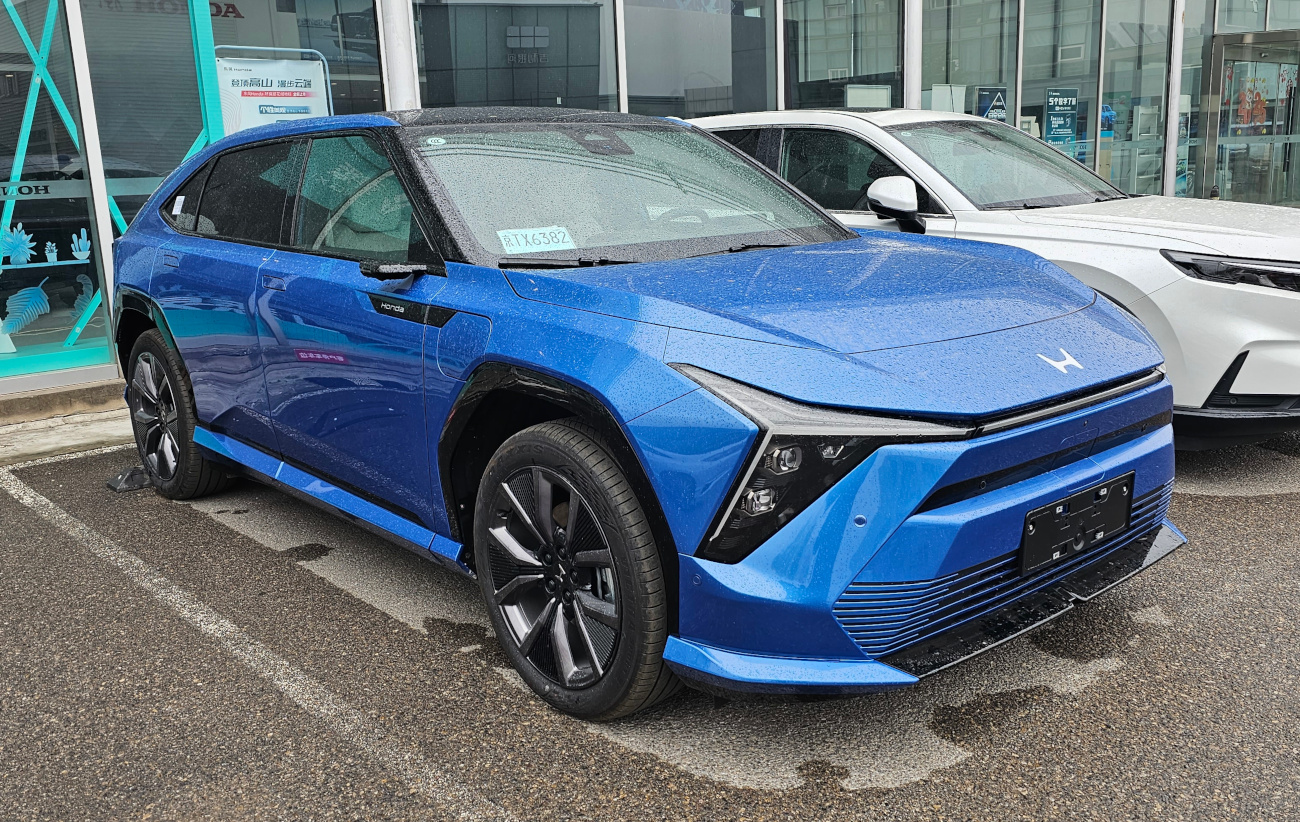
Honda S7

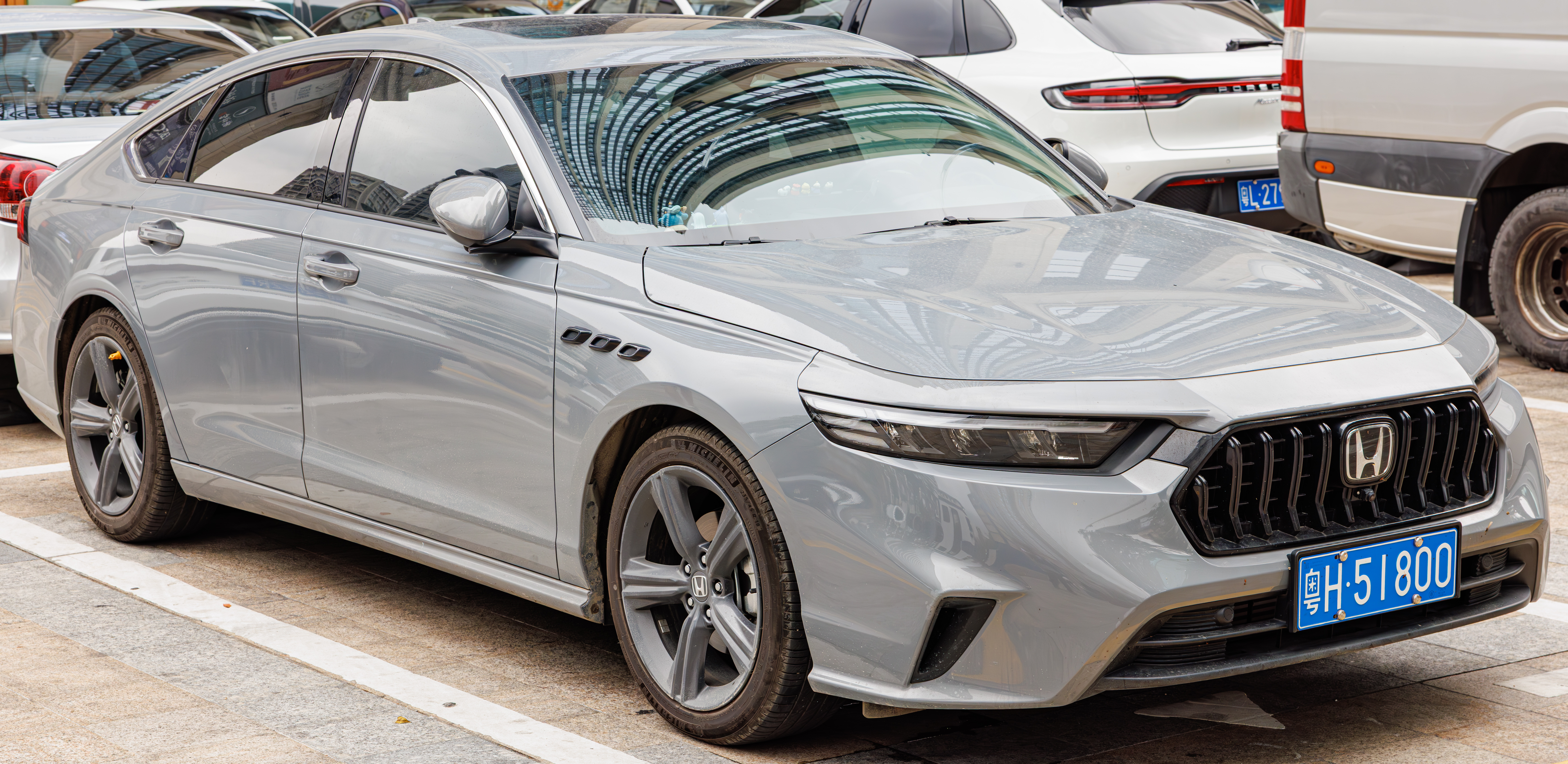
Honda Inspire

=== Dongfeng Nissan ===
Nissan and Dongfeng have a long-standing relationship. Early on, the Chinese company produced diesel-powered Nissan trucks built from complete knock-down kits, and Nissan lent Dongfeng technical assistance. When the Chinese State began allowing foreign automakers market access through joint ventures, Nissan remained with Dongfeng.

As an example of the extensive and comprehensive nature of Nissan's technical assistance to the Chinese company, in 2011 nearly 70% of products Dongfeng manufactured were connected in some way to Nissan.

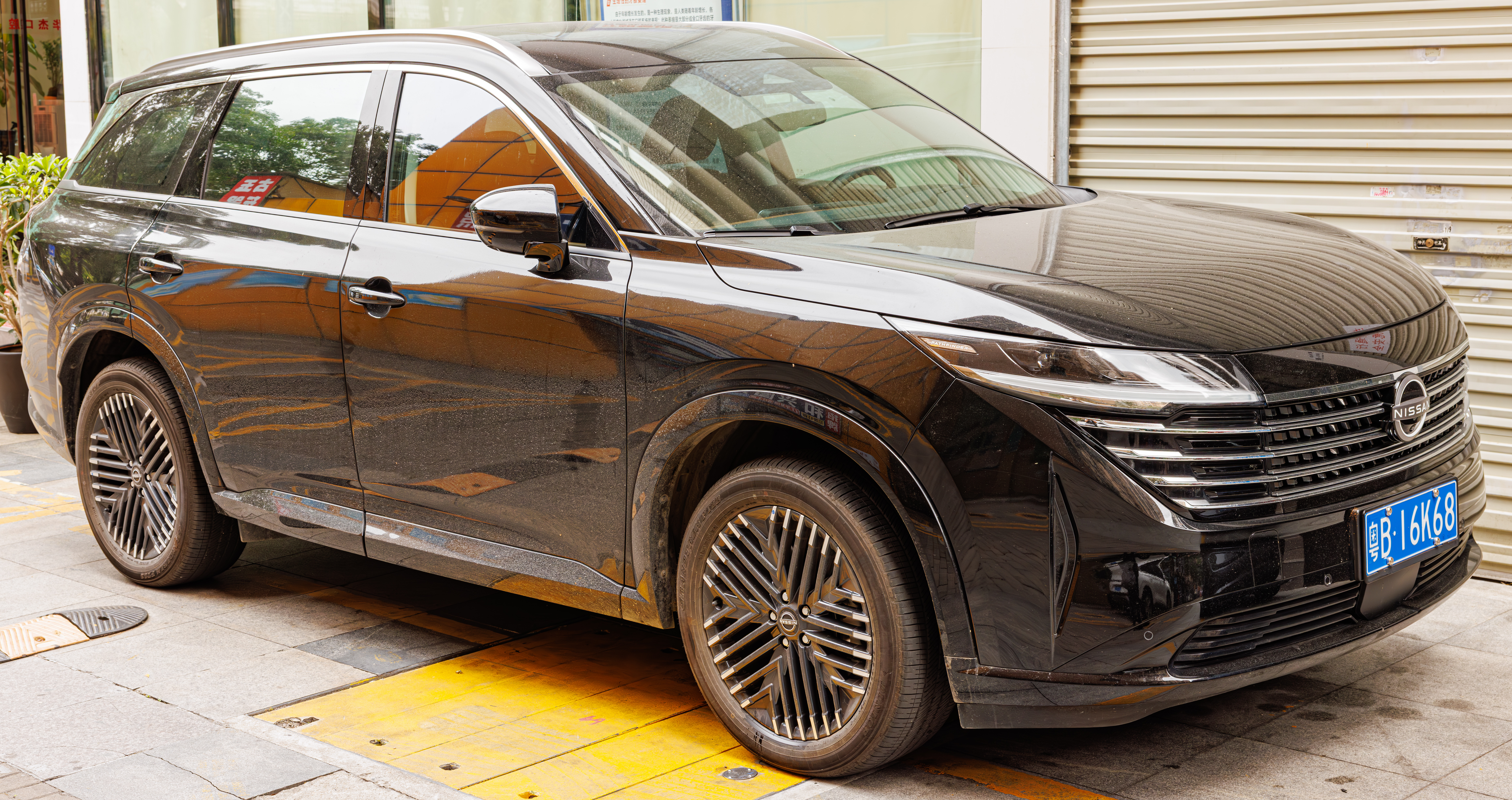
Nissan Pathfinder

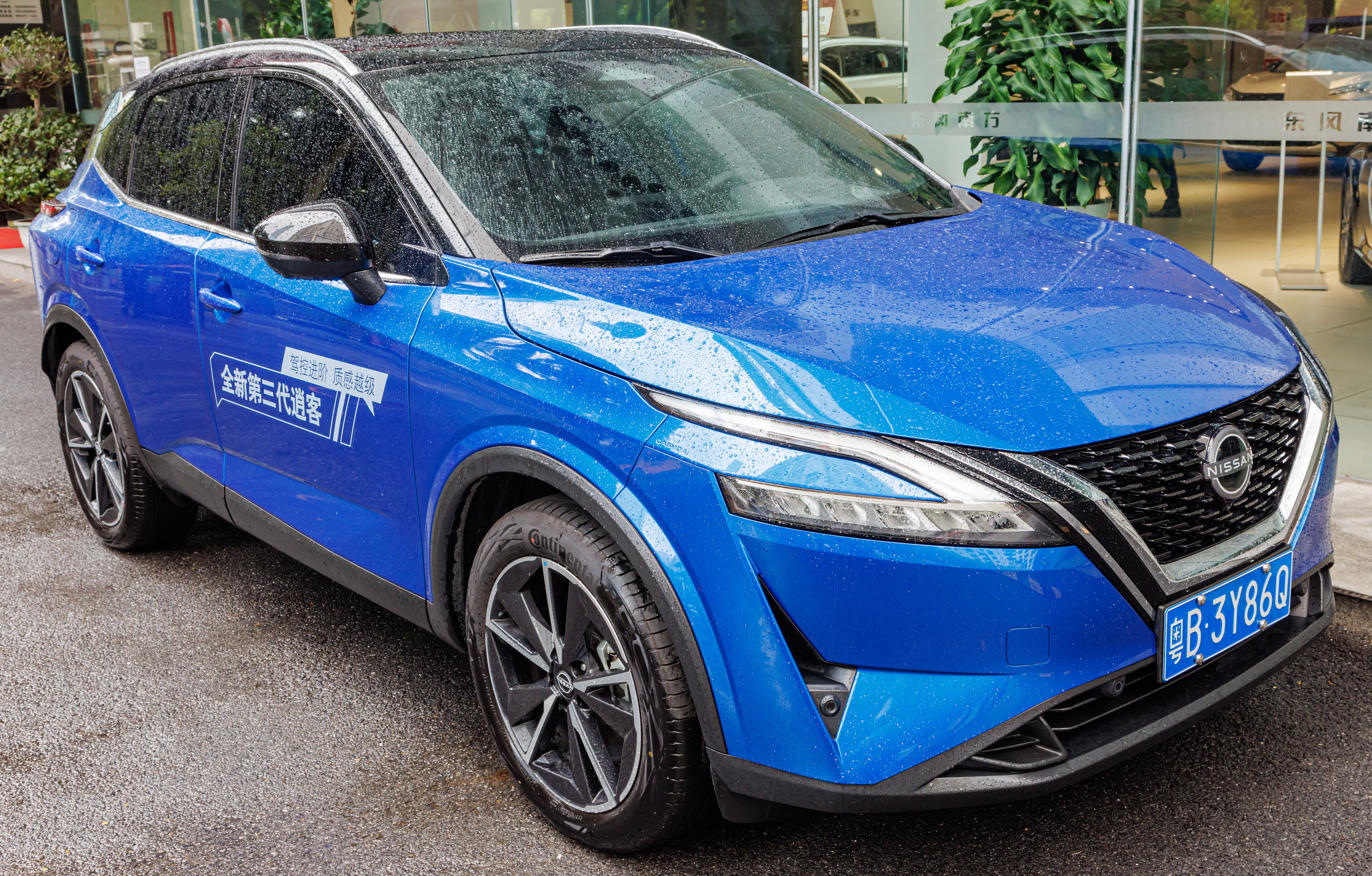
Nissan Qashqai

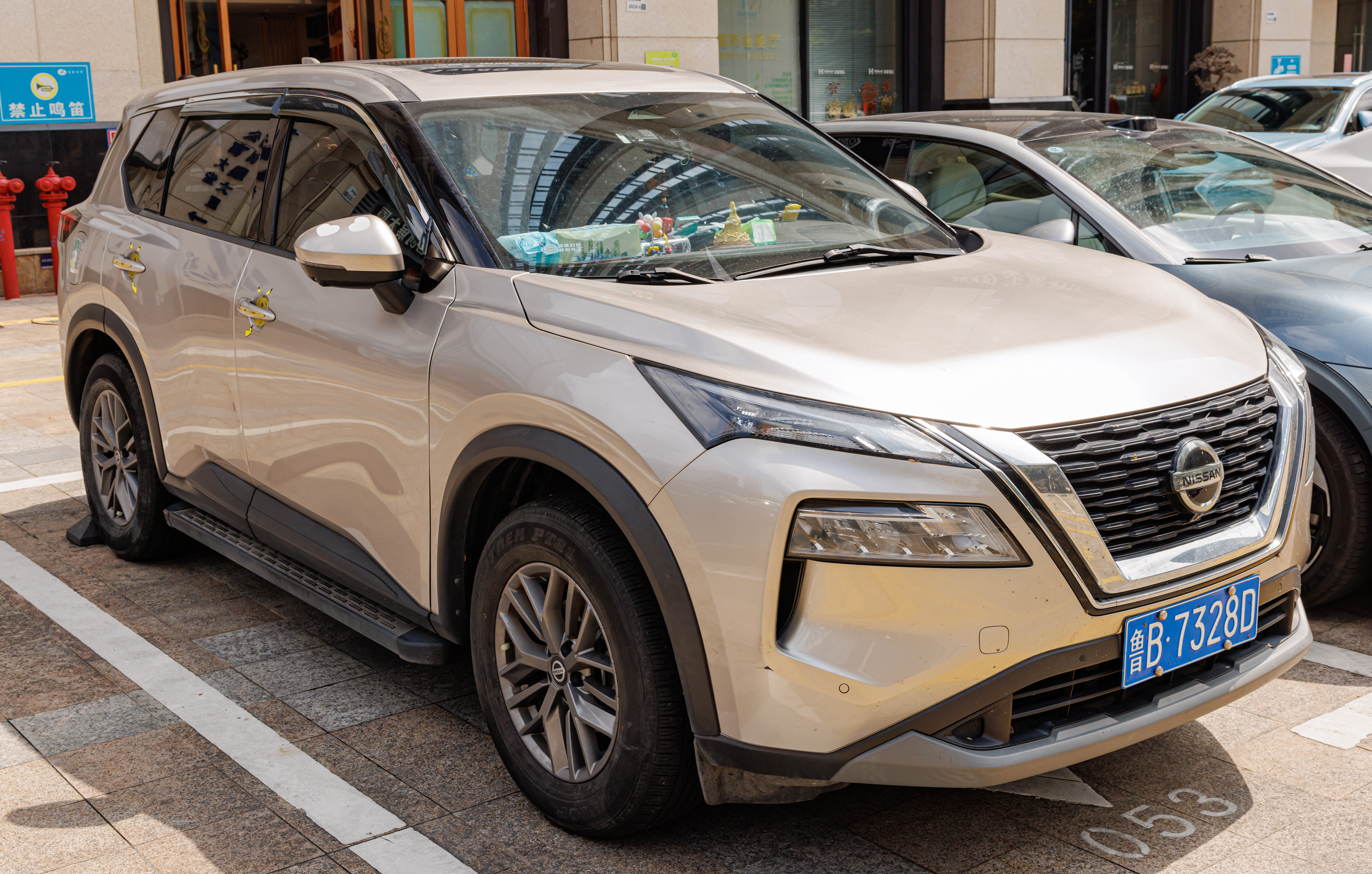
Nissan X-Trail

==== Dongfeng Motor Co., Ltd. (Dongfeng Nissan) ====
Established in 2002, Dongfeng Motor Co., Ltd (DFL) began operating in July 2003. Nissan holds 50% ownership in this maker of heavy trucks, light commercial vehicles, and passenger cars. Heavy-duty trucks and buses exclusively carry the Dongfeng brand name, light-duty trucks use both the Nissan and Dongfeng names, and consumer offerings are Nissan products. While the great majority of passenger cars retain the Nissan name, a small number sell under the brand name Venucia which is Dongfeng–Nissan's brand which offers cheaper products targeted at less-affluent inland city consumers. Venucia (Qi Chen) launched its first models in 2012. The name is derived from that of the Roman goddess of beauty, Venus.

A few of its Dongfeng-branded light commercial vehicles have been exported to Afghanistan, Pakistan, Africa, and the Middle East.

Infiniti-branded vehicles are most probably imported as of 2006, but 2013 news stories suggested that some production would be moved to China in the future. Manufacture of the brand in China may have begun with the Q50L being produced at a site in Xiangyang sometime after 2014.

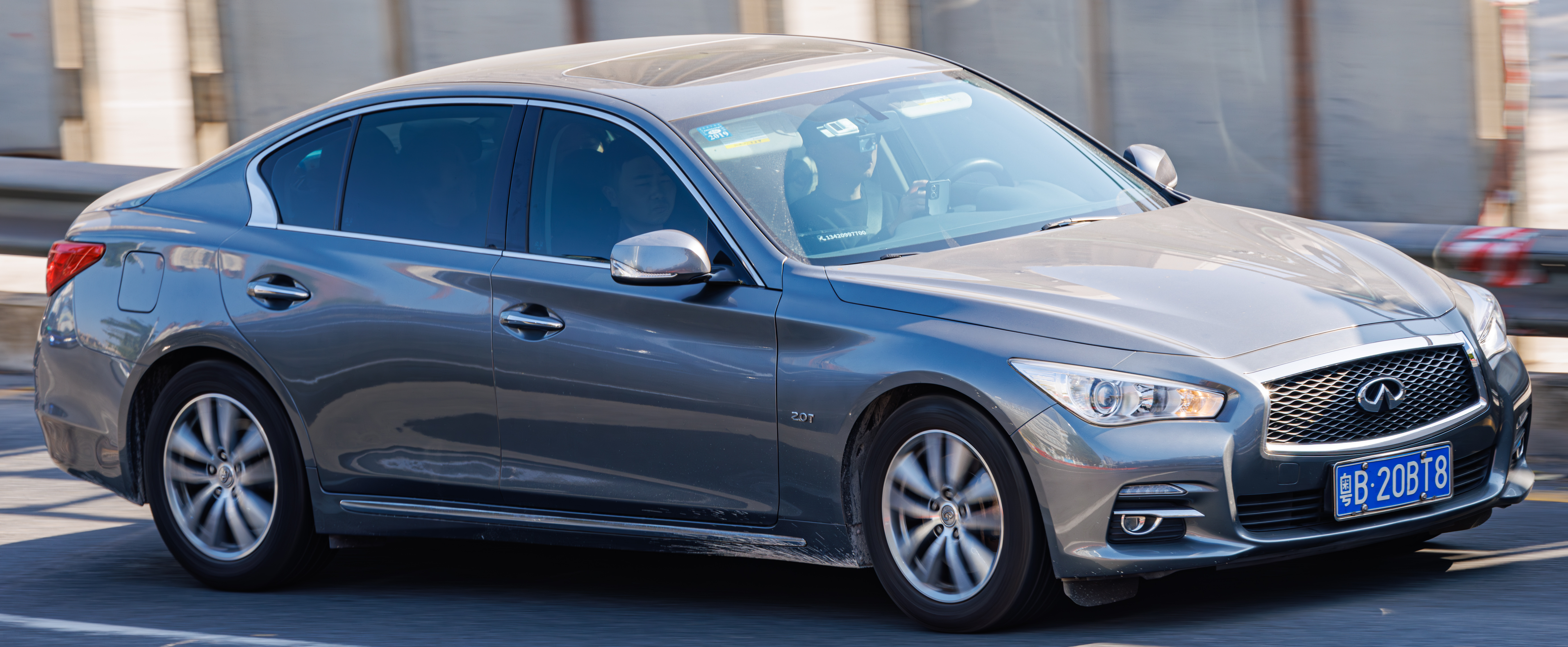
Infiniti Q50L

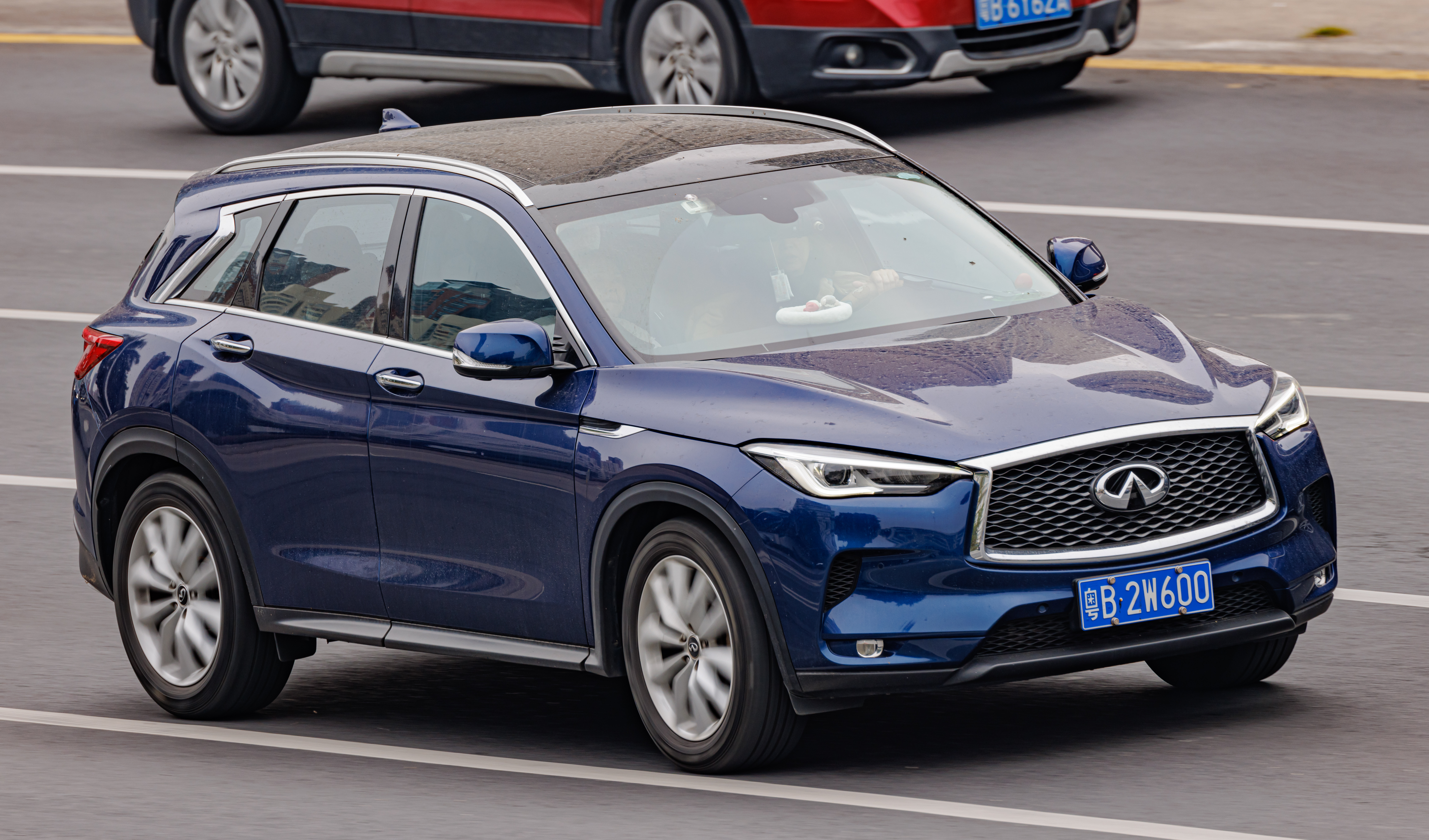
Infiniti QX50

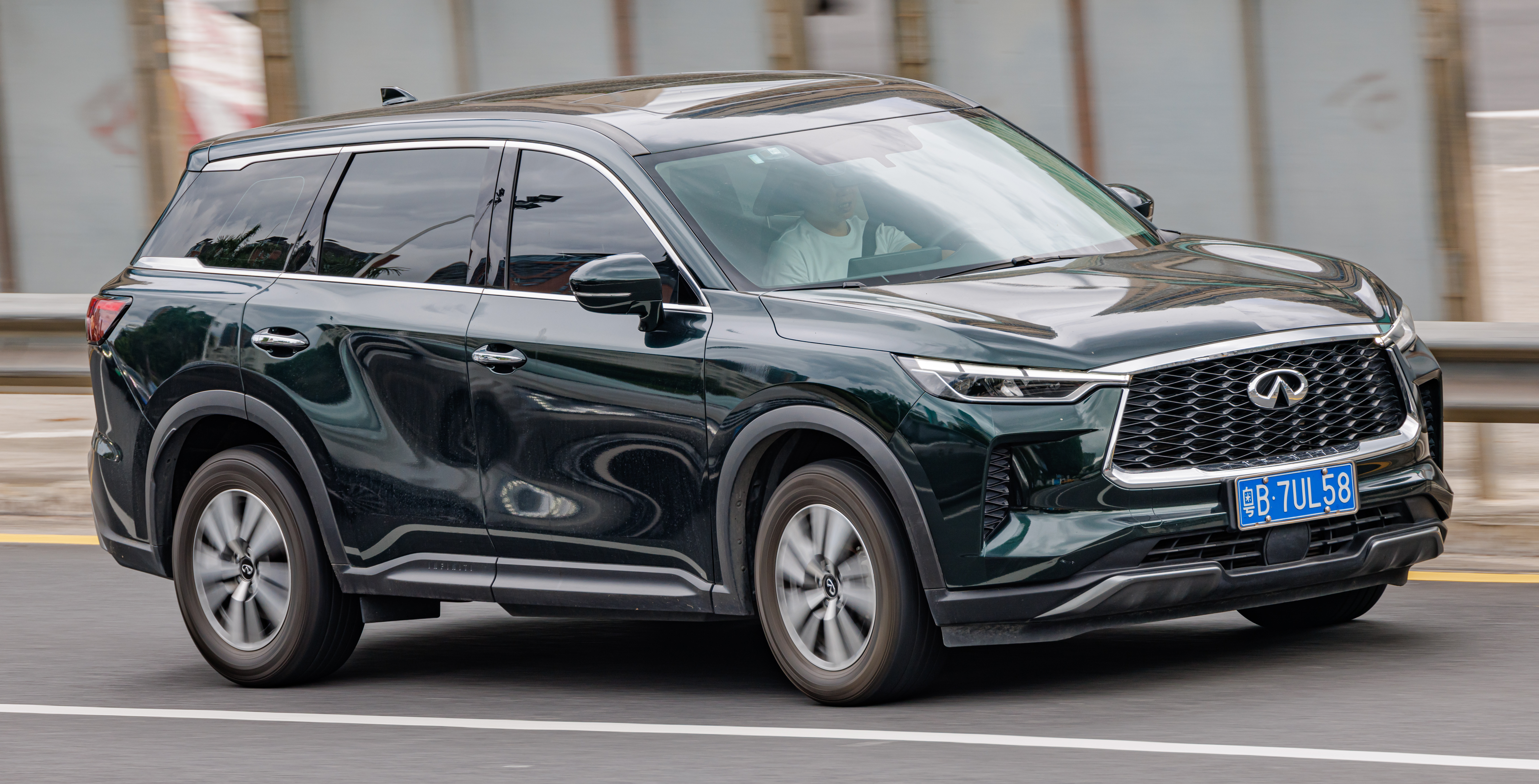
Infiniti QX60

==== Venucia ====
Dongfeng Venucia Motor Company is a subsidiary of Dongfeng Motor Co., Ltd. established in 2017 and focused on the marketing and production of passenger cars. The Venucia marque, launched in September 2010, was originally owned by Dongfeng Nissan Passenger Vehicle, another subsidiary of Dongfeng Motor Co., Ltd.

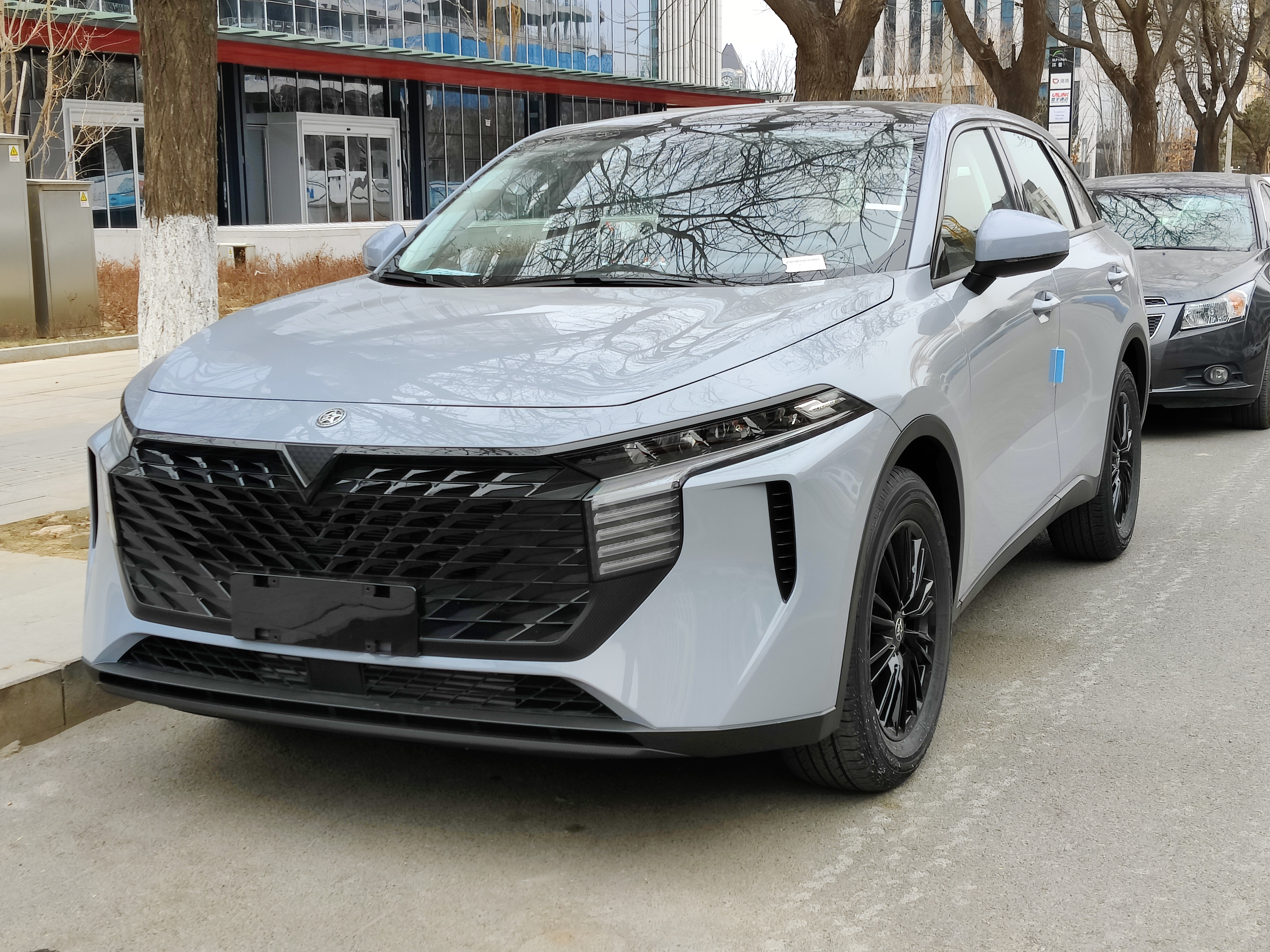
Venucia V-Online

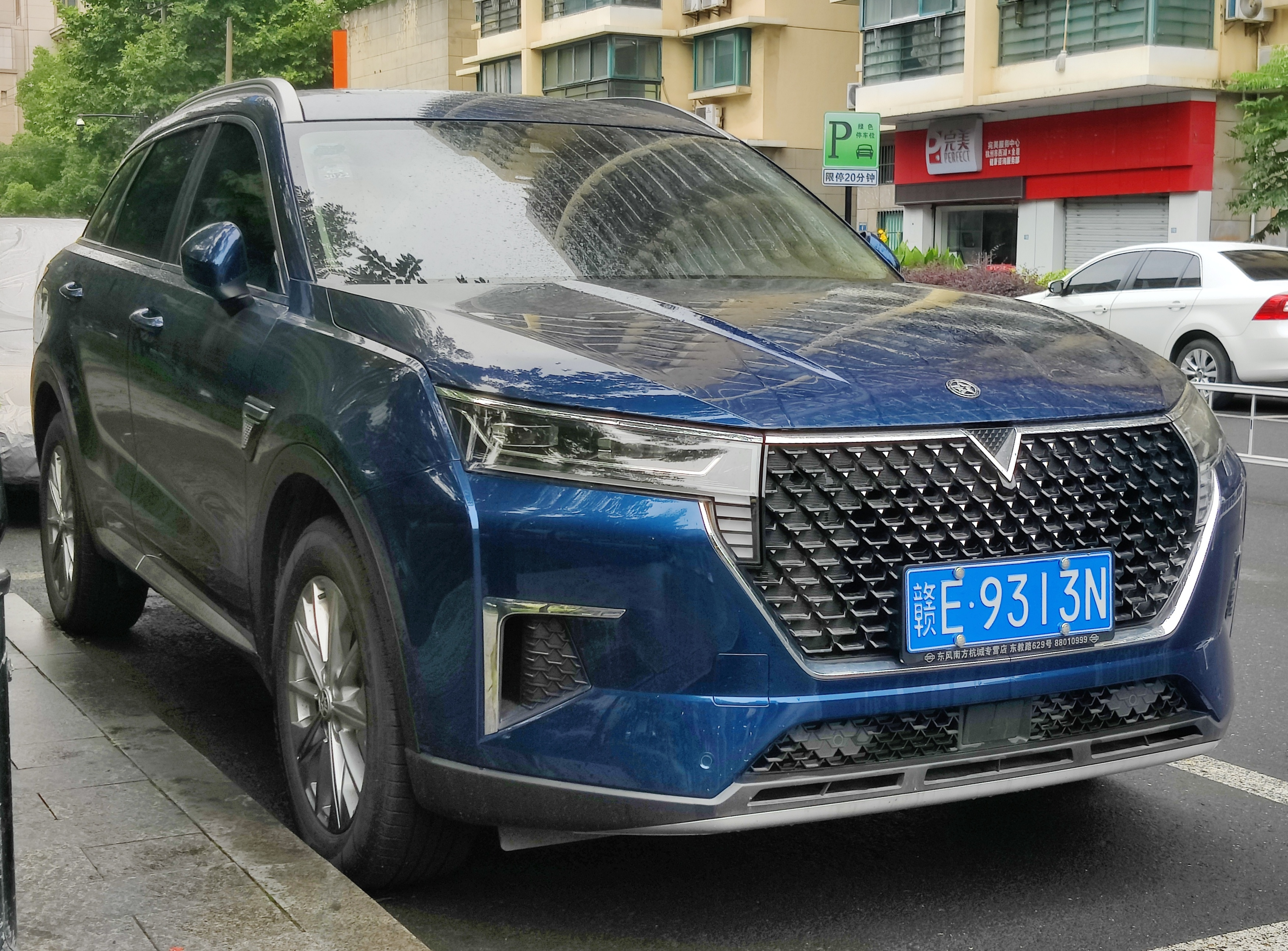
Venucia Star

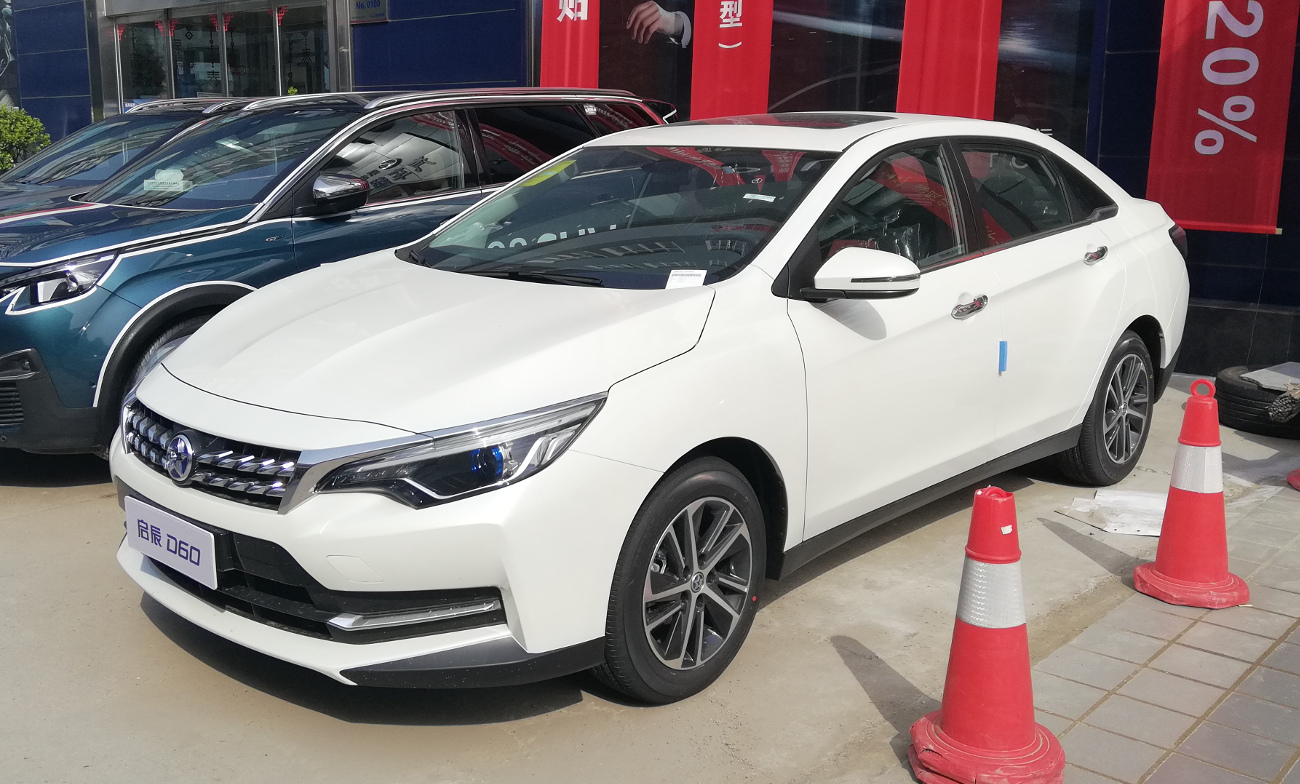
Venucia D60

==== Fengdu ====
Launched in 2013, Fengdu (风度) is a sub-brand of Dongfeng Automobile started by producing out of production Nissan CUVs bearing the Dongfeng logo. Older Nissan tooling was set up in China by Zhengzhou-Nissan to produce the second generation Nissan X-Trail rebadged as the Dongfeng Fengdu MX6.

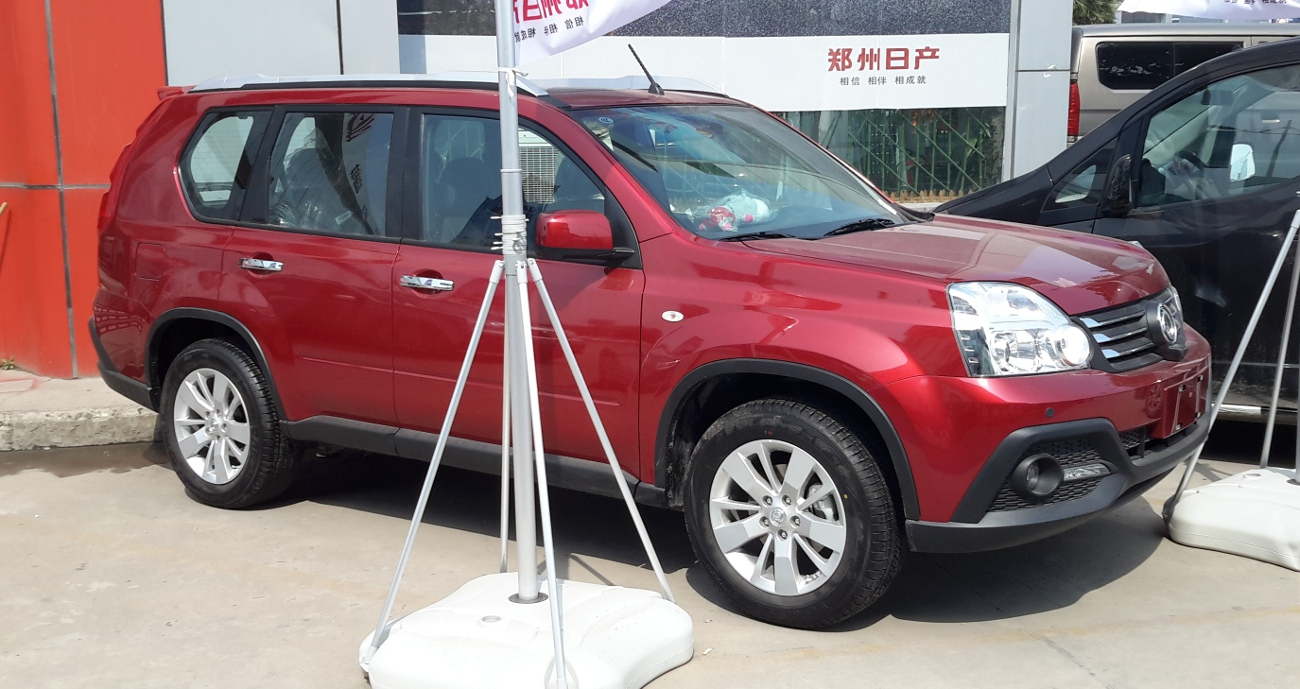
Dongfeng Tengshi MX6

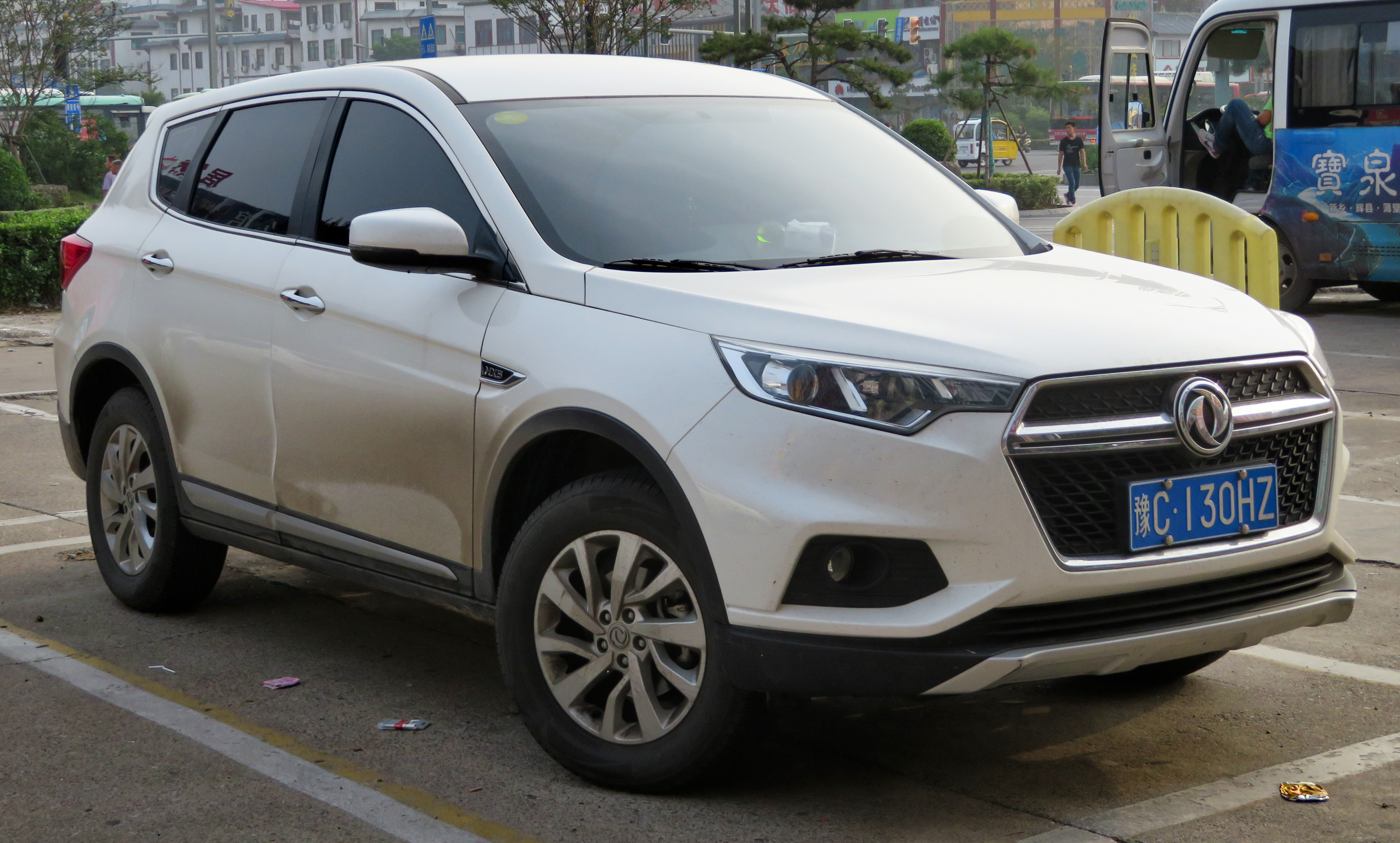
Dongfeng Fengdu MX5

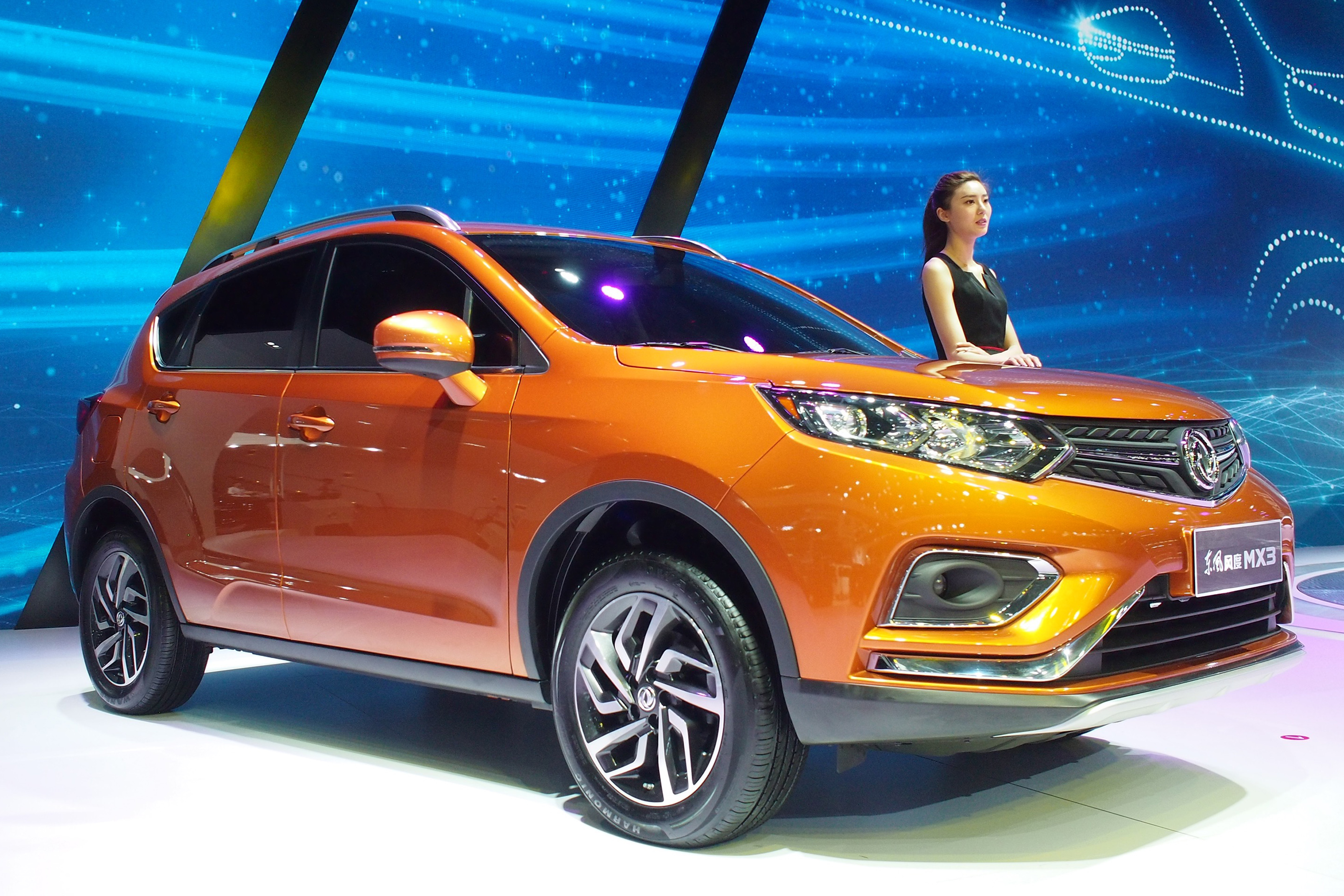
Fengdu MX3

==== Nissan Import & Export (Guangzhou) ====
The Nissan Import & Export (Guangzhou) is the first joint venture vehicle import and export entity set up by a foreign-funded automotive company in China. Nissan holds a 60% stake, while Dongfeng Motor Group holds the remaining 40%. The Dongfeng Nissan N7 and Frontier Pro PHEV will be the first models developed locally in China for export to overseas markets.

==== Other Nissan joint ventures ====
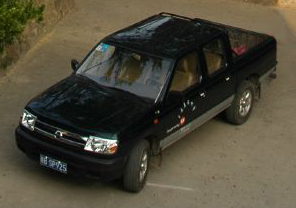
Dongfeng Rich (Rui Qi in Chinese)

Other joint ventures include Dongfeng Nissan Passenger Vehicle Co, a unit of Dongfeng Motor Company that makes automobiles for the domestic market and has exported to Egypt. Another unit of Dongfeng Motor Co., Ltd., Zhengzhou Nissan Automobile Co, manufactures light commercial vehicles. Most Zhengzhou products are sold under the Dongfeng brand, such as the Dongfeng Rich (Rui Qi), a reworked Nissan D22.

==== Nissan joint venture sites ====
A passenger-car production base and technical center in Guangzhou, Guangdong, are part of both the Nissan joint venture Dongfeng Motor Co and a unit of that joint venture, Dongfeng Nissan Passenger Vehicle Co.

Another Guangzhou production base manufactures Nissan engines. As of 2009, a Nissan joint venture engine production base in Shiyan, Hubei province, produced diesel engines and other sites, auto parts. It is possible this location has been shuttered and the tooling moved as Dongfeng bought out Nissan's stake in a joint venture company, Dongfeng Nissan Diesel Motor Co Ltd, as part of a deal to initiate a new joint venture with Volvo. In the Huadu District of Guangzhou, a production base was under construction in late 2010. Planned to have a 240,000 units/year production capacity, these may be engines not vehicles. It could be the large-scale vehicle production base under construction in 2010 that would expand Dongfeng-Nissan local production capacity in this area to 600,000 units/year.

A joint venture with Nissan has a production base, Zhengzhou Light Truck plant, in Zhengzhou, Henan. In 2010, this was joined by a second, increasing production capacity by 120,000 units/year. Production capacity figures may consider engines and vehicles as discrete.

A handful of Nissan joint venture production bases are located in Xiangfan, Hubei, making light commercial vehicles and cars.

=== Dongfeng Stellantis Automotive Technology ===
In August 2026, Dongfeng and Stellantis announced to established an joint venture called Dongfeng Stellantis Automotive Technology. The company plans to develop and produce electrified Peugeot and Jeep models for both the Chinese market and global export starting from 2027. Its equity is held by three main shareholder groups: Dongfeng Peugeot-Citroën (DPCA) holds 24.1%, Dongfeng and Stellantis each hold 13.5%, and the Wuhan local state-owned enterprises collectively hold 48.9%.

=== Dongfeng Peugeot-Citroën ===
Dongfeng Peugeot-Citroën Automobile Company is a joint venture with PSA Peugeot-Citroën set up in 1992 and based in Wuhan, capital of Hubei province.

Currently selling a range of Peugeot and Citroën models, its first offering was a hatchback built from semi-complete knock-down kits, the ZX Fukang. Its first Peugeot-branded product was introduced in 2004.

Some of the engines made by this joint venture are used in other Dongfeng passenger car products, the Fengshen S30 and H30, for example.

As of 2010, the PSA Peugeot Citroën joint venture had two production bases in Wuhan, and a third base for this joint venture was in the planning stages around 2010. Xiangfan serves as location for a powertrain production base for the joint venture with PSA Peugeot Citroën as of 2010. An R&D center in Shanghai, the China Tech Center, is wholly owned by PSA Peugeot Citroën but lends assistance to the joint venture with this French automaker.

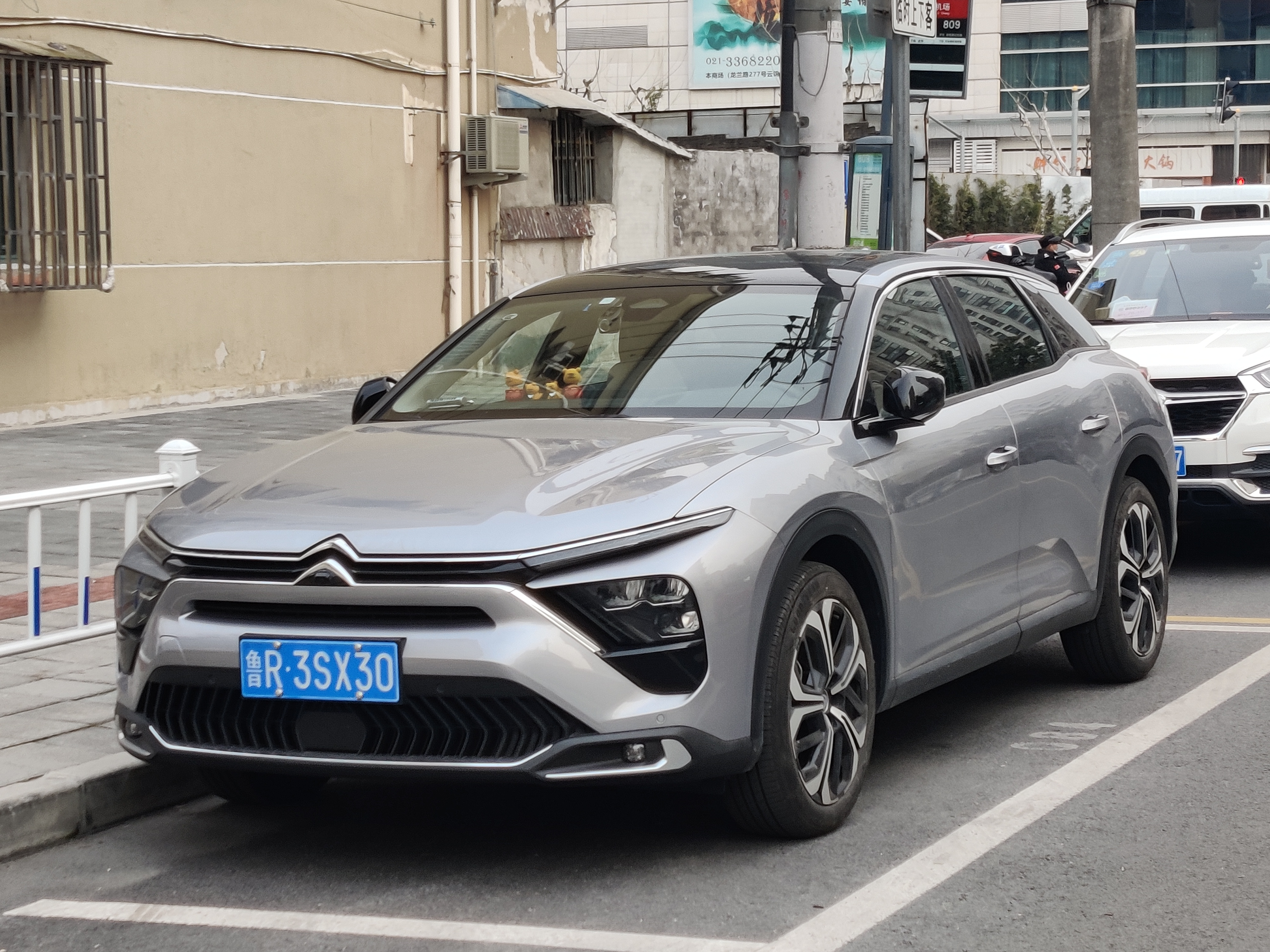
Citroën C5 X

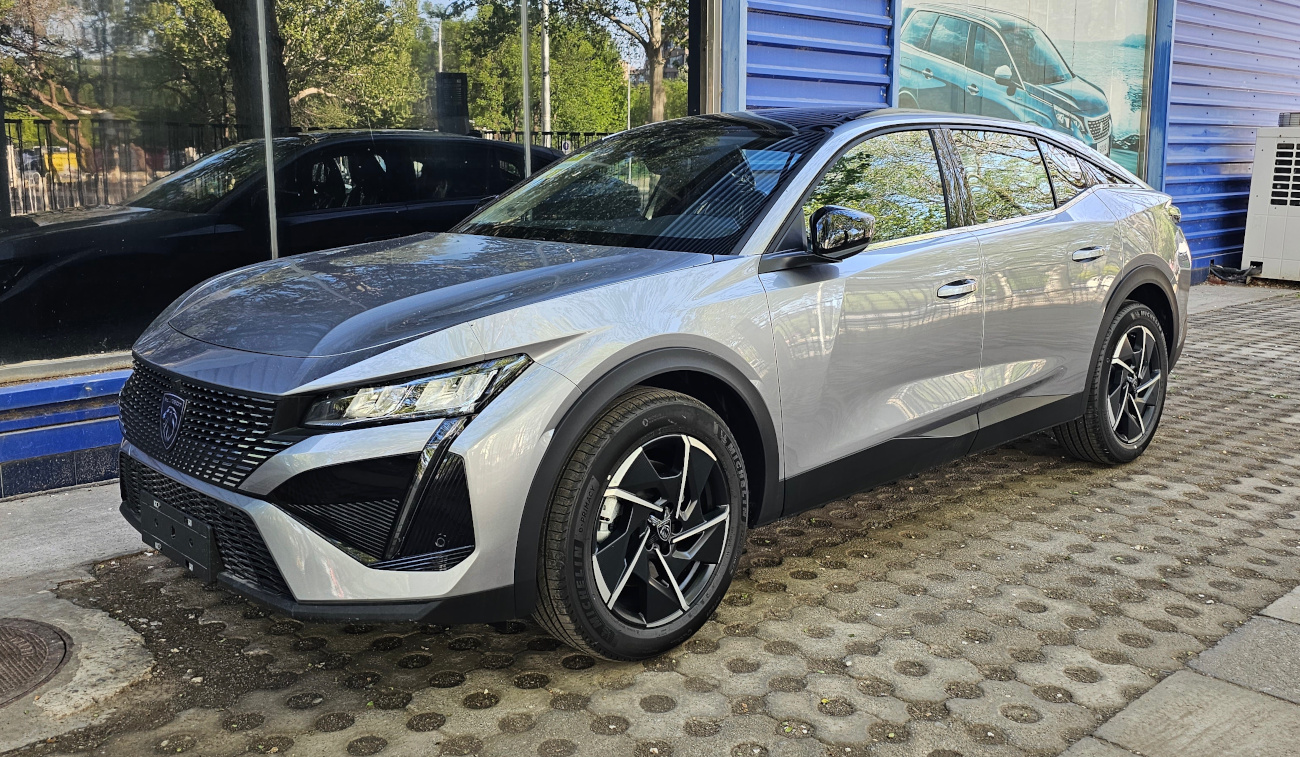
Peugeot 408 X

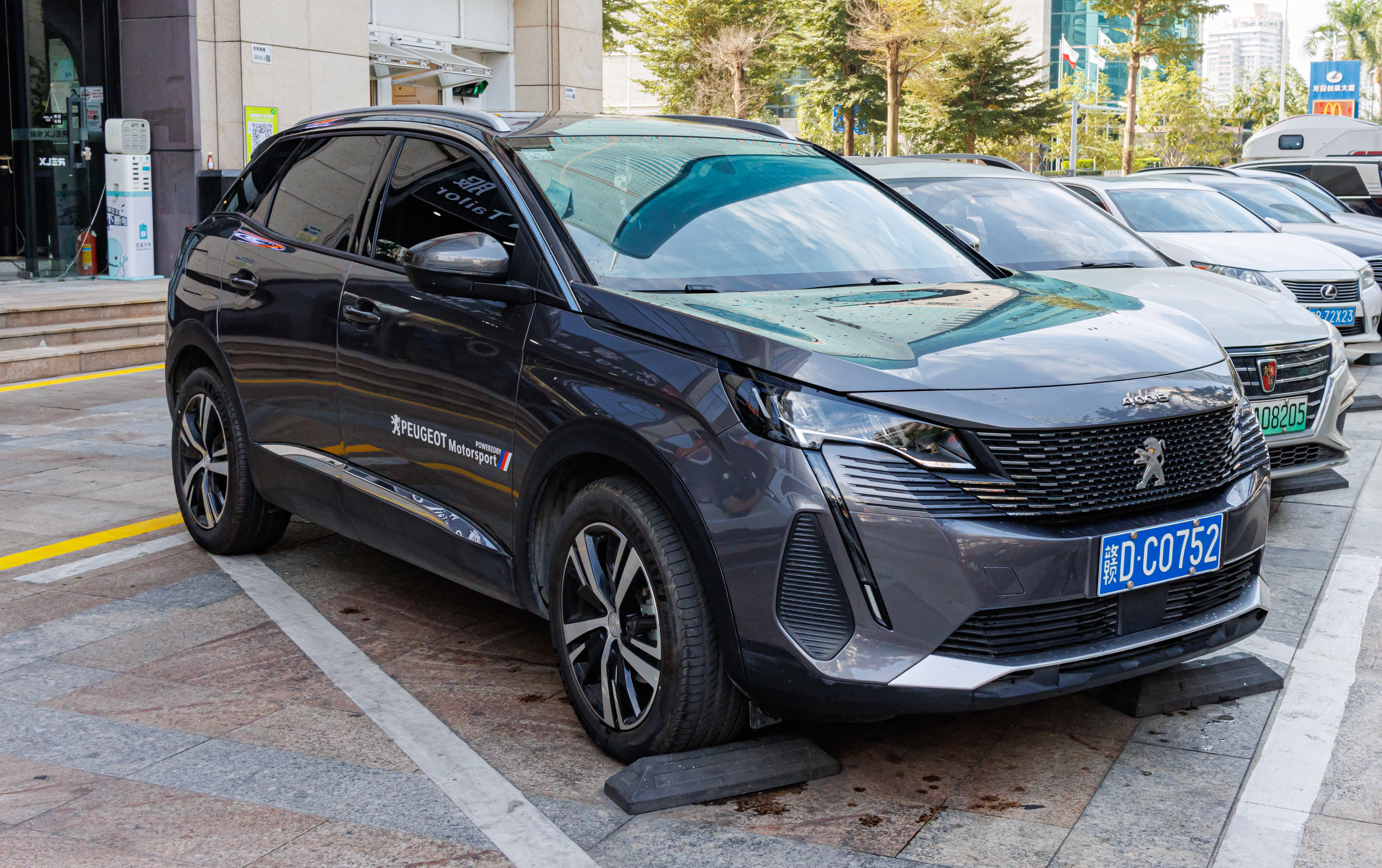
Peugeot 4008

=== Dongfeng Skio Junfeng ===
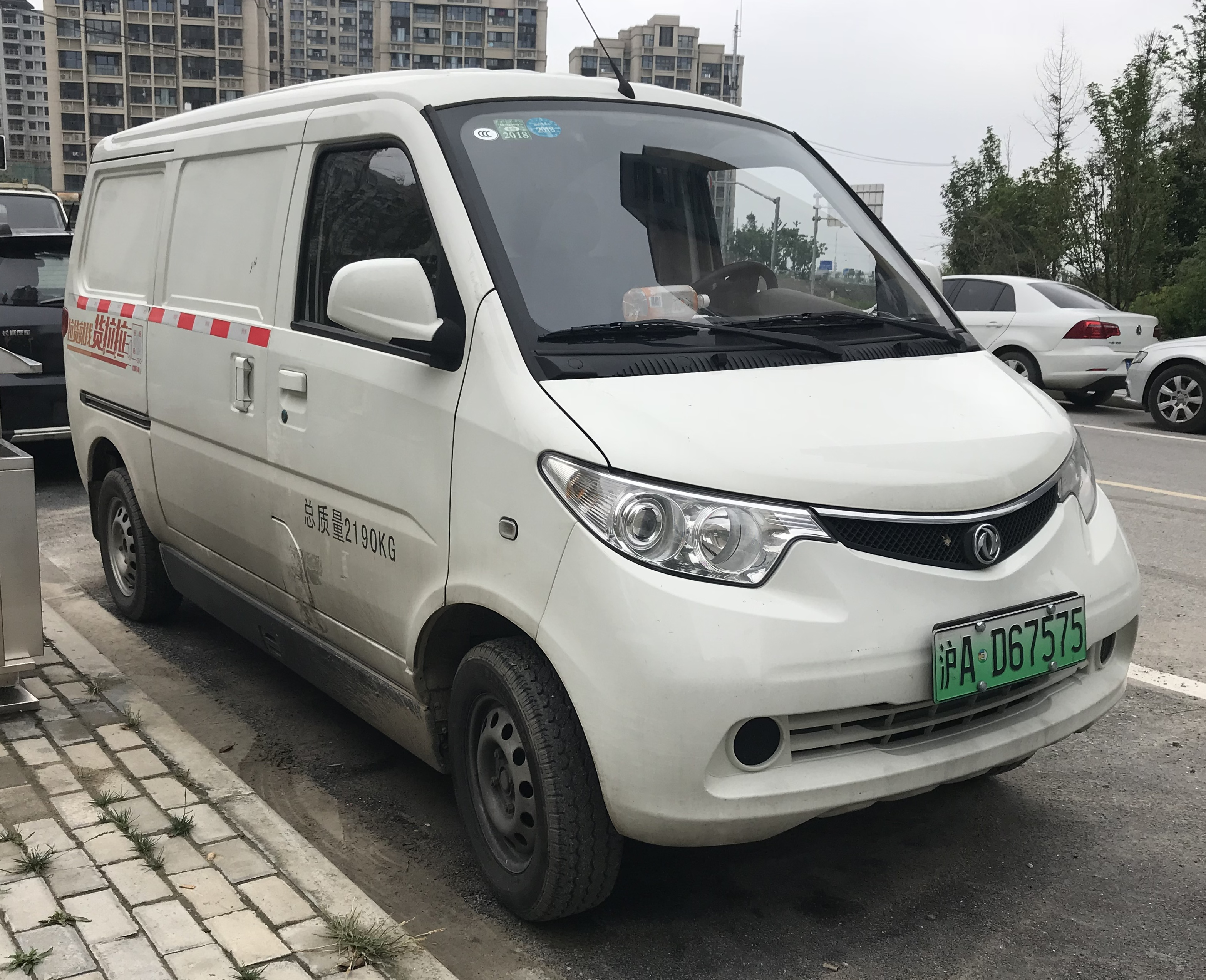
Skio Junfeng electric van

Dongfeng Skio is a sub-brand of Dongfeng that focuses on producing electric vehicles. The current lineup are mostly Dongfeng-petrol-car-based electric vehicles.

Current products sold under the Skio brand included:

- Dongfeng Skio Junfeng
- Dongfeng Skio ER30
- Dongfeng Skio E11K

== Defunct ==
=== Dongfeng Sokon (DFSK) (divested) ===
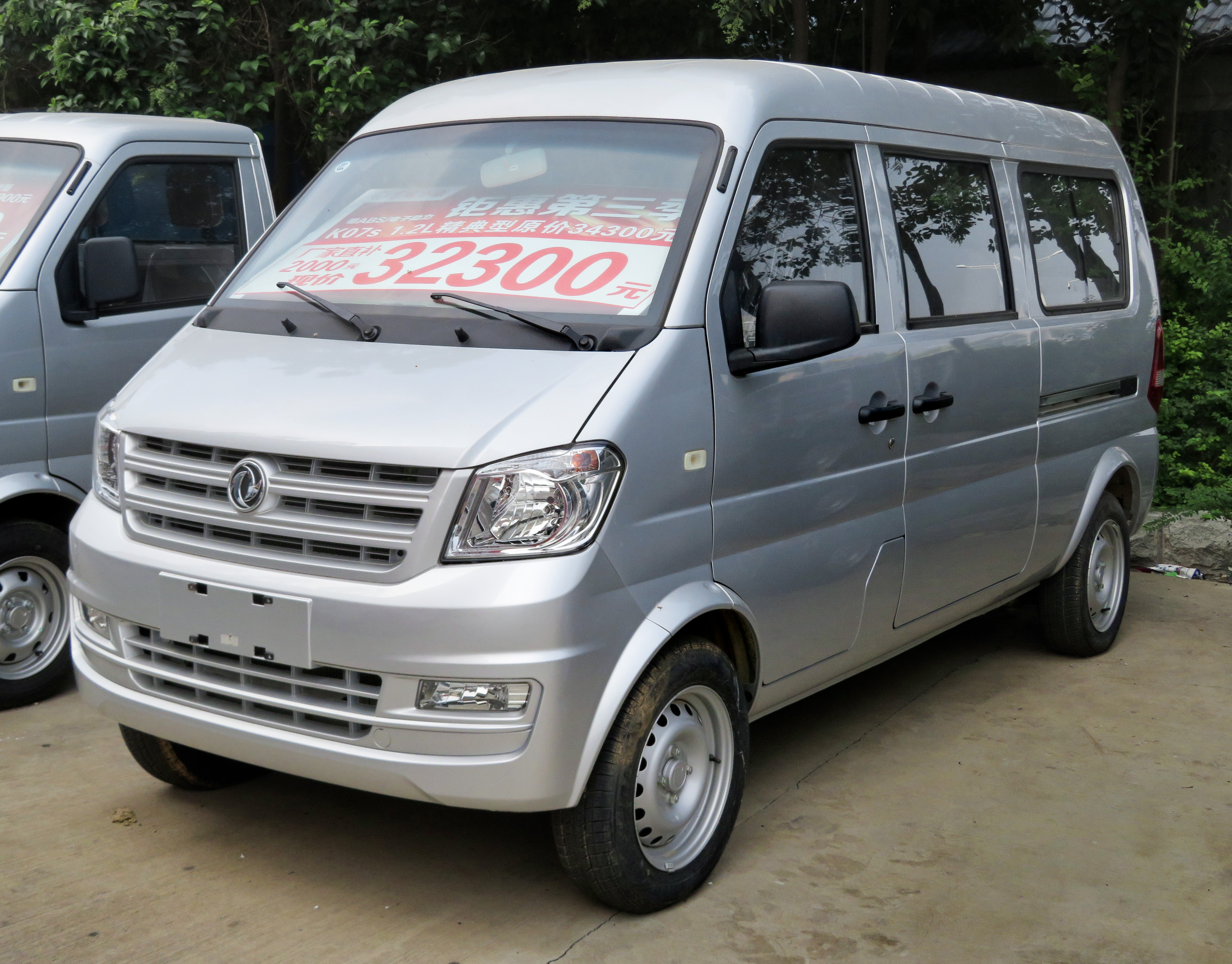
Dongfeng Sokon K07S

Dongfeng DFSK (Sokon) or in Chinese Dongfeng Xiaokang (东风小康) is Sino-sino joint venture between Dongfeng and Seres Group Co Ltd. Brands under the joint venture includes Dongfeng Sokon (DFSK, sometimes known as DF Dongfeng as the official website suggests) light commercial vehicles and Dongfeng Fengguang passenger vehicles. Seres also has its own electric startup brand based in North America called SF Motors.

In September 2019, Sokon acquired the remaining 50% of the DFSK joint venture from Dongfeng Motor Group (DFG), becoming 100% owner. They continue to produce vehicles using the Dongfeng logo and under the Dongfeng Sokon and Dongfeng Fengguang (Fengon) branding.

=== Dongfeng Renault (defunct) ===
Created in late 2013, Dongfeng Renault Automotive Co Ltd planned to produce 150,000 whole vehicles per year at an as-yet-unbuilt production base in China. This facility may become operational as early as 2016.

In August 2020, the Dongfeng Renault venture was officially dissolved and Renault transferred its stake to Dongfeng.

As of 2023, Renault does not produce vehicles in China, but maintains small joint ventures that do not use Renault branding. Dongfeng and Renault both maintain a stake in EV startup BeyonCa. Renault also has a technology deal with Geely and a 50% owned joint venture with Jiangling Motor (JMEV).

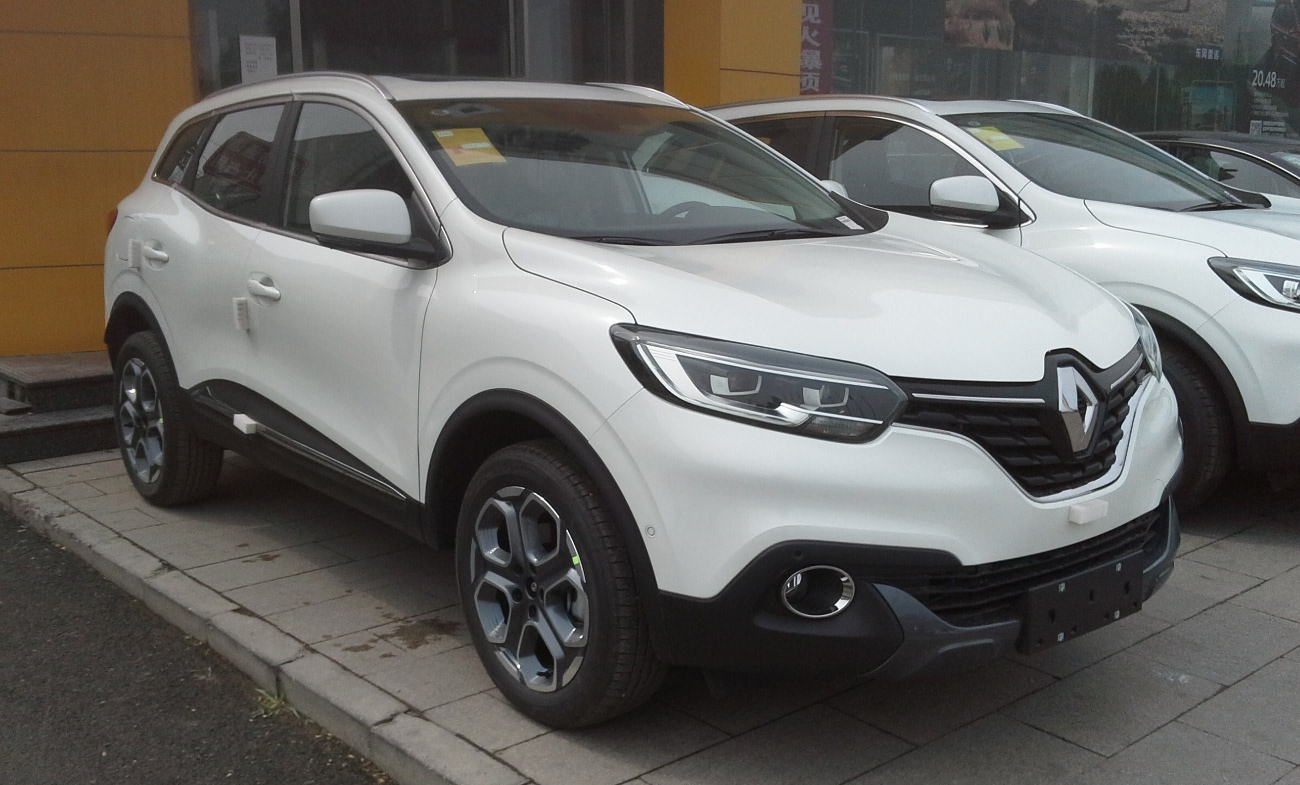
Renault Kadjar

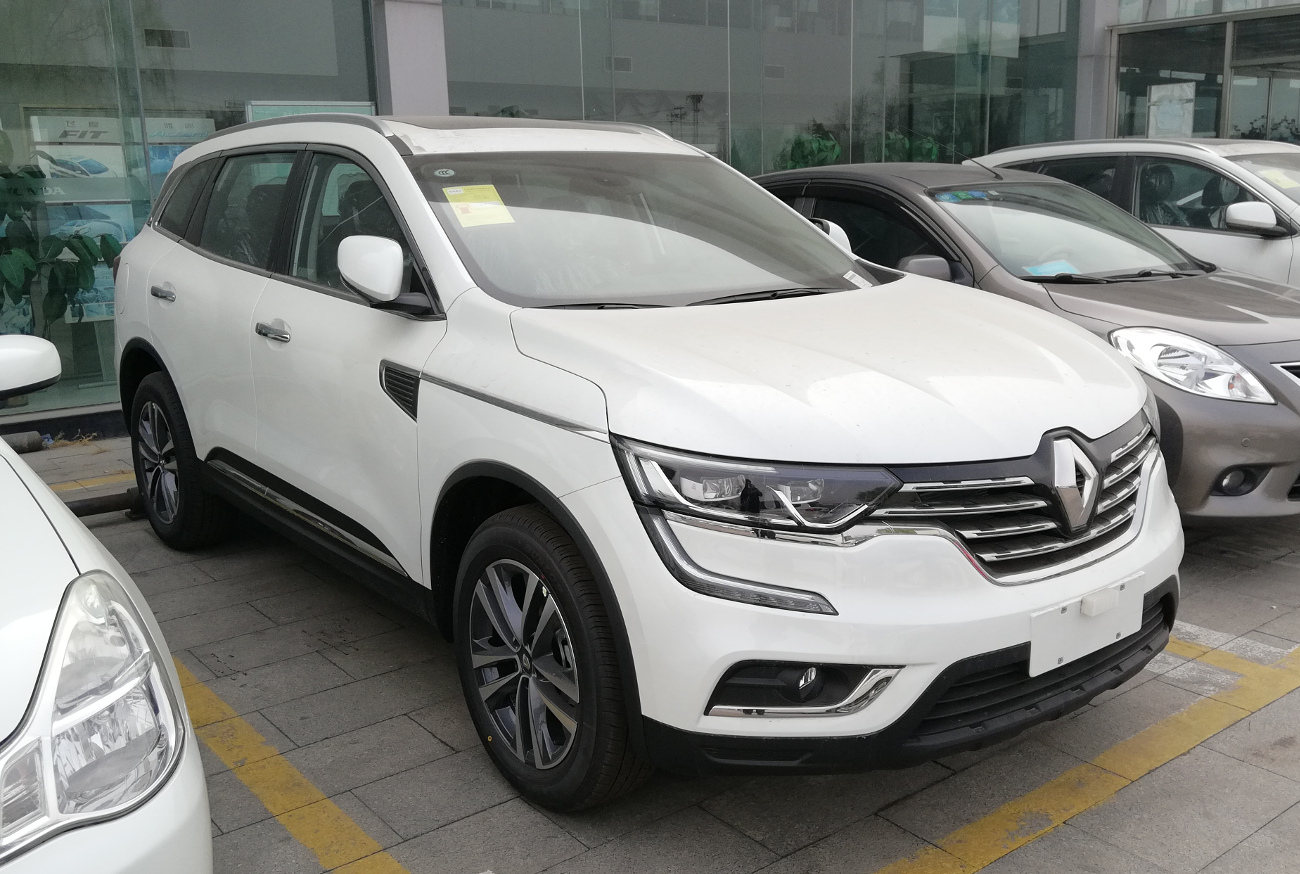
Renault Koleos

=== Dongfeng Yulon (defunct) ===
An equally owned joint venture with Taiwanese automaker Yulon, Dongfeng Yulon (or Dongfeng Yulong), was set up in 2009 and will manufacture Yulon's Luxgen models in China. Dongfeng Yulon began production of its first model, the Luxgen 7 SUV, on 28 July 2011.

The venture was liquidated in November 2020.

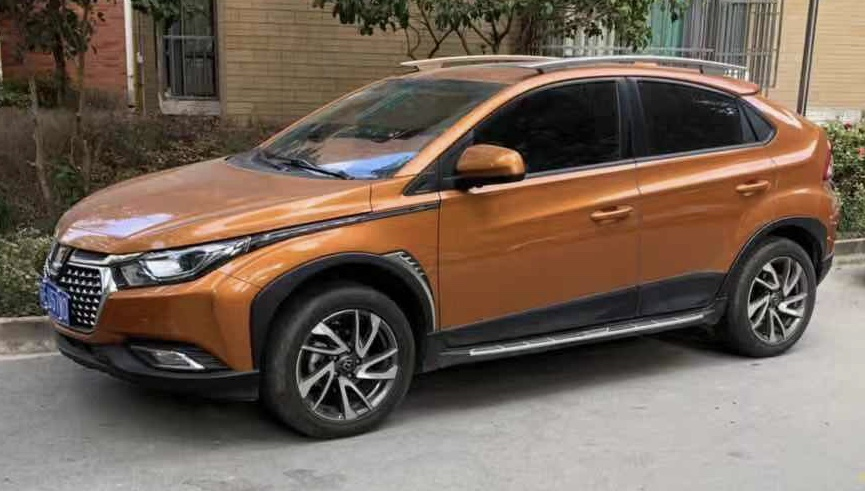
Luxgen U5

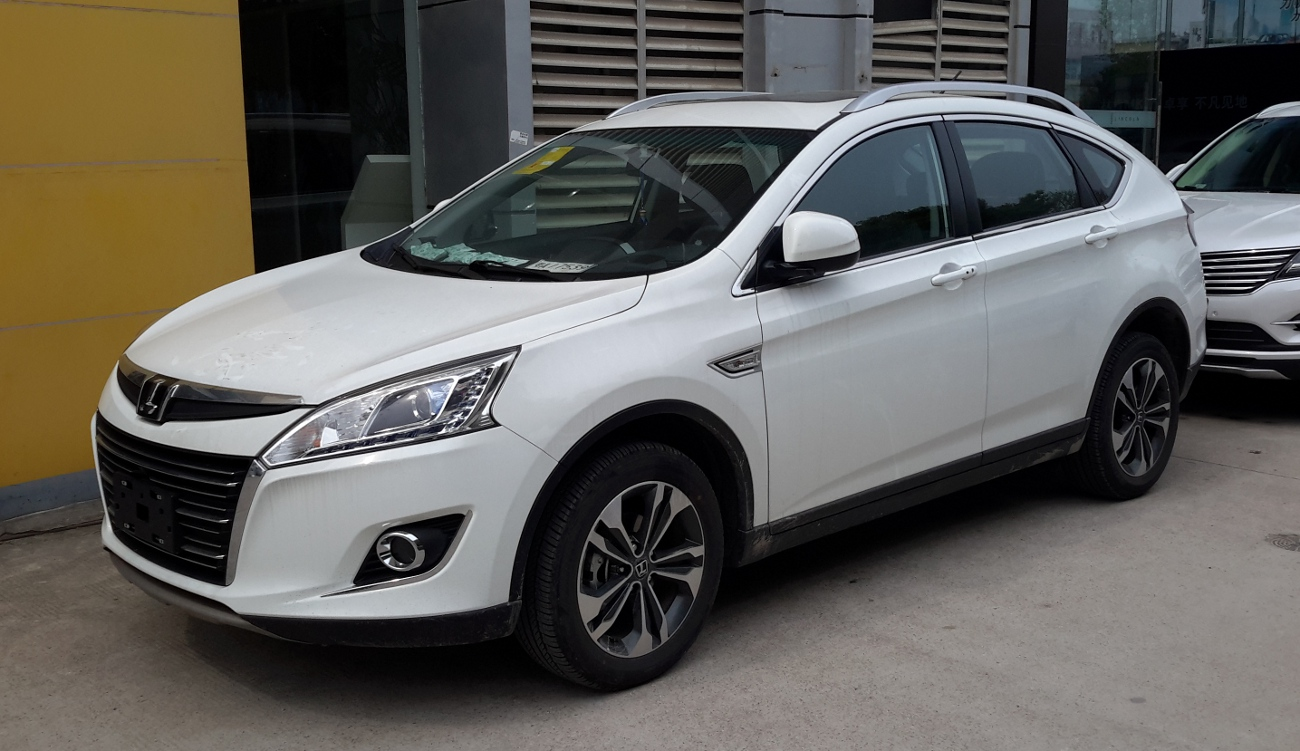
Luxgen U6

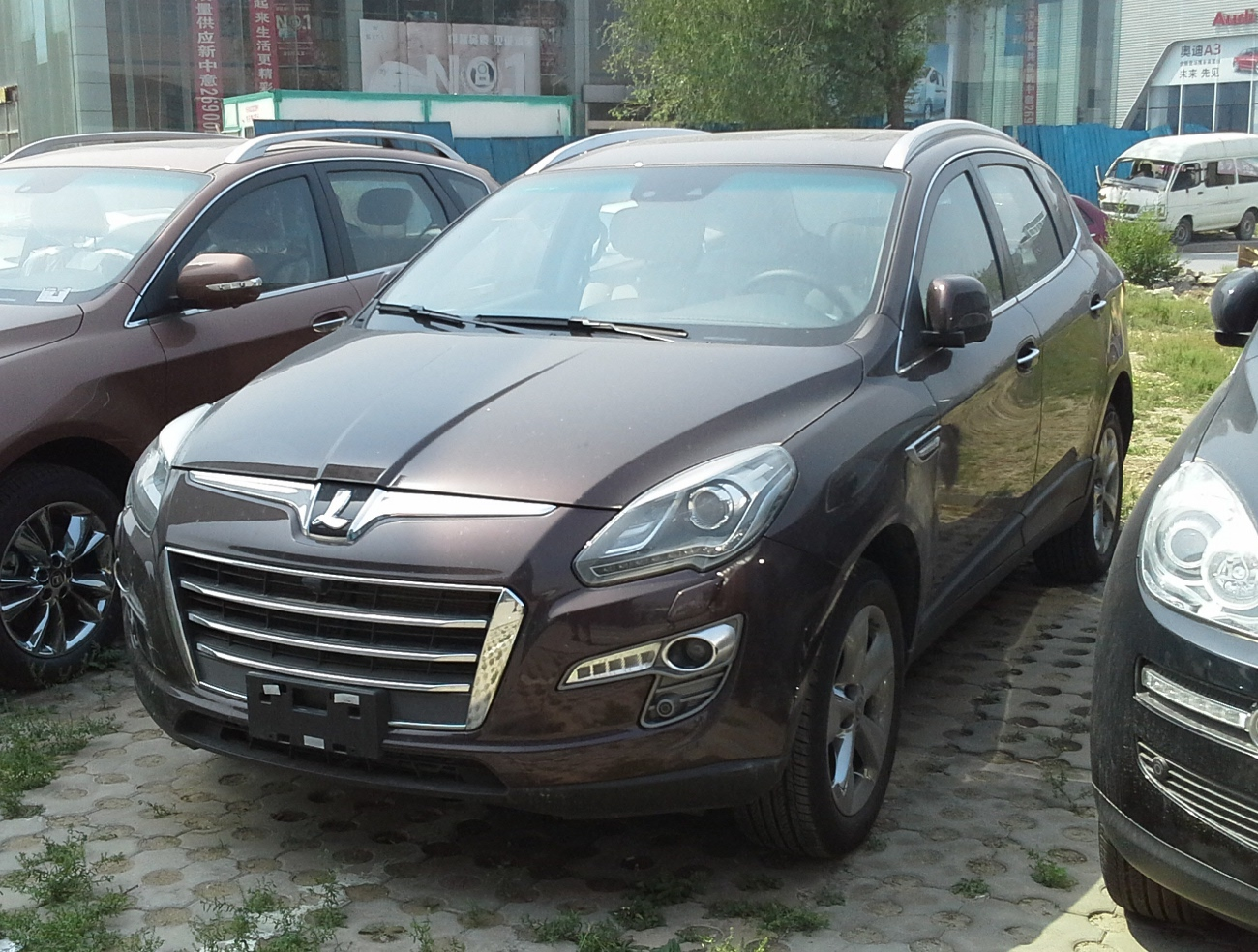
Luxgen U7

=== Dongfeng Yueda Kia (defunct) ===
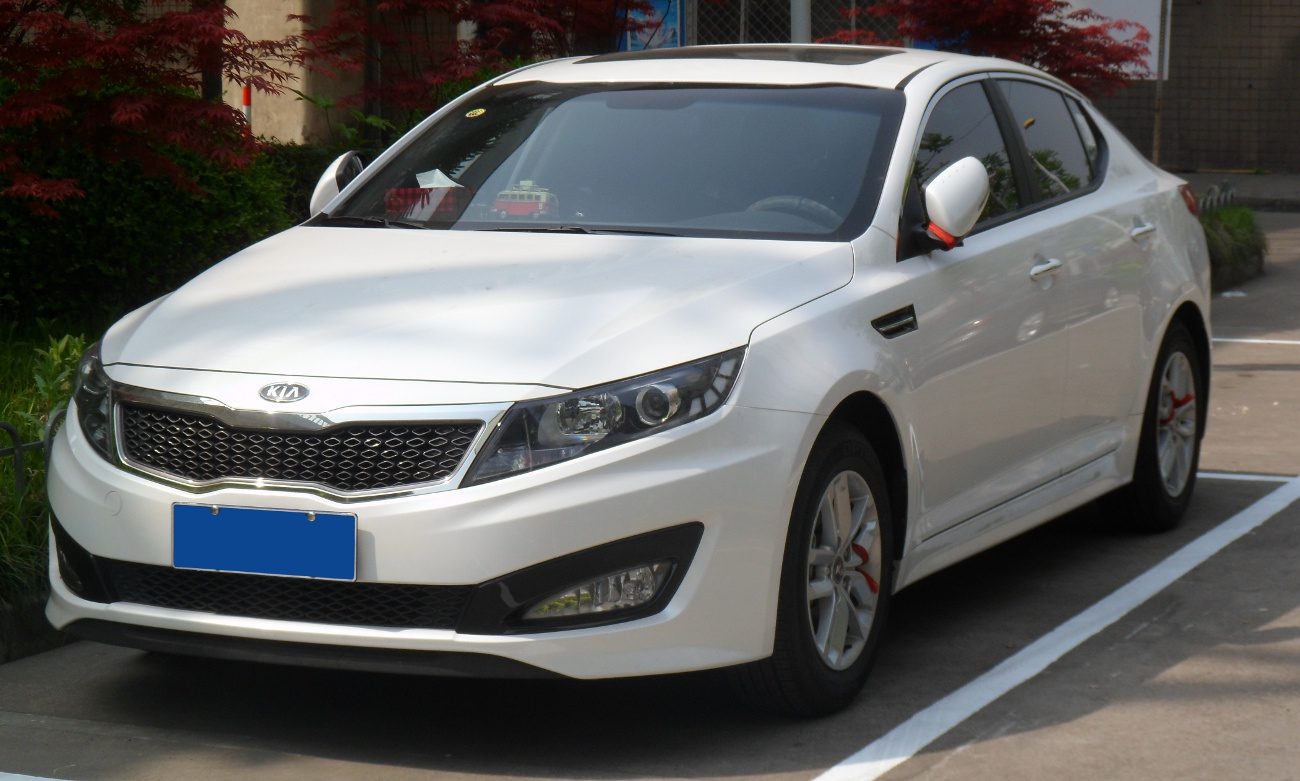
A Kia K5 made by Dongfeng Yueda Kia

A joint venture with the Korean Kia Motors, Dongfeng Yueda Kia Automobile Co is based in Yancheng, Jiangsu province, and produces Kia-branded automobiles for the Chinese market. As of 2007, it has two production bases–the newer located in the Yancheng Economic Development Zone of Jiangsu province.

Kia may have initially partnered with Jiangsu Yueda Auto Works–not Dongfeng–in an effort that produced the Kia Pride c. 1997. Dongfeng soon stepped in, however, forming Yueda Kia Motors in 1999 and buying out Jiangsu Yueda's ownership in March 2002. Prior to this and as of 2007, Kia had a 50% share while Dongfeng and Jiangsu Yueda Investment Co Ltd (SSE: 600805) each held 25% ownership.

In 2010, the Sportage was the 8th most-purchased SUV in China. The company was reported as having two production bases in China that year.

As of 2017, Korean automakers in China continued to flog a product mix highly reliant on less-favored sedans and were seeing flagging sales amid rising political tensions between China and the Korea peninsula.

In December 2021, Dongfeng sold its 25% stake in the joint venture to Jiangsu Yueda for ¥ RMB297 million and exited the venture.

=== Minor joint ventures ===
==== Dongvo (Hangzhou) Truck Company ====
Reflecting its past foreign partner, Dongvo Truck Co was formerly named Dongfeng Nissan-Diesel Company. Currently, it is a joint venture between Volvo's UD Trucks and Dongfeng established in 1996.

Its manufacturing site is located in Hangzhou producing UD branded commercial vehicles and buses.

Volvo's first joint venture company with Dongfeng, Dongvo Truck Co was the precursor to a larger scale cooperation, Dongfeng Commercial Vehicles, but may continue to exist independently of this newer legal entity.

==== Chufeng ====
Chufeng (also called CHTC) was founded in 1957 as a joint venue located in Hubei.They manufacture private use vehicles, including cement mixers, dump trucks, oil tankers, crane trucks, school buses, garbage trucks, street sweepers, construction vehicles, cargo vans, box trucks, semi trucks, fire trucks, and livestock transportation vehicles.

== Military products ==
=== Dongfeng Mengshi ===
Dongfeng Mengshi (东风猛士) is a brand for military vehicle, which belongs to the Special Purpose Equipment Division of Dengfeng Motor Corporation (DFM). It entered the civilian market in 2021 with the launch civilian version Mengshi M50, a military off-roader.

To distinguish the M-Hero (猛士科技) and Mengshi (东风猛士) which have similar name in Chinese, the M-hero belongs to Dongfeng Motor Group (DFG), which is a listed company. The Dongfeng Mengshi belongs to Dongfeng Motor Corporation (DFM), the parent company of DFG. DFM is an unlisted company and most of its military production information are classified.

- Dongfeng Mengshi MS600, military armored vehicle.
  - Dongfeng Mengshi M20 (2023–present), full-size pickup/SUV, civilian variant
- Dongfeng EQ2050/Dongfeng Mengshi (2007–present), military armored vehicle
  - Dongfeng Mengshi M50 (2021–present), civilian variant, full-size pickup
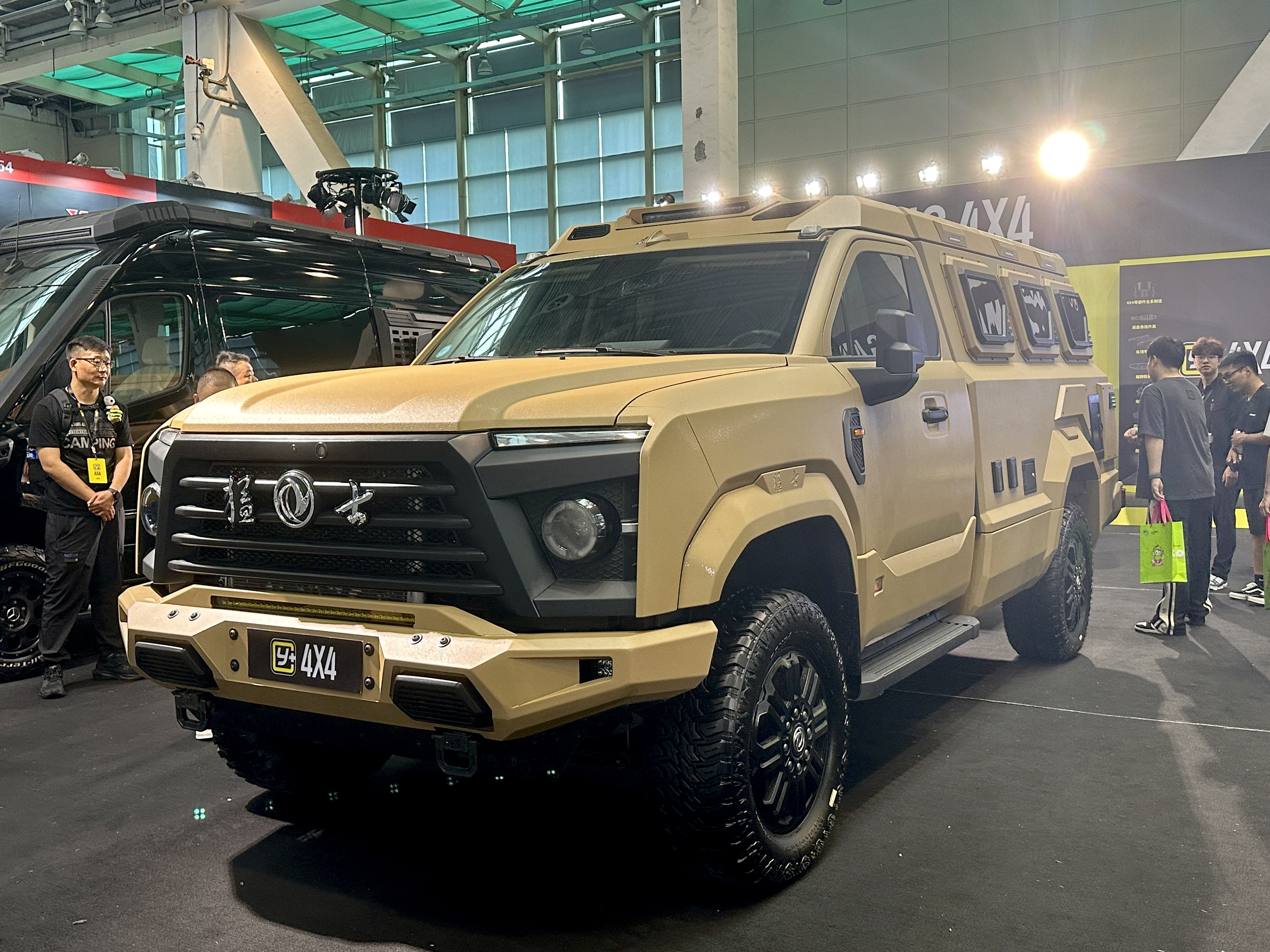
Dongfeng Mengshi MS600

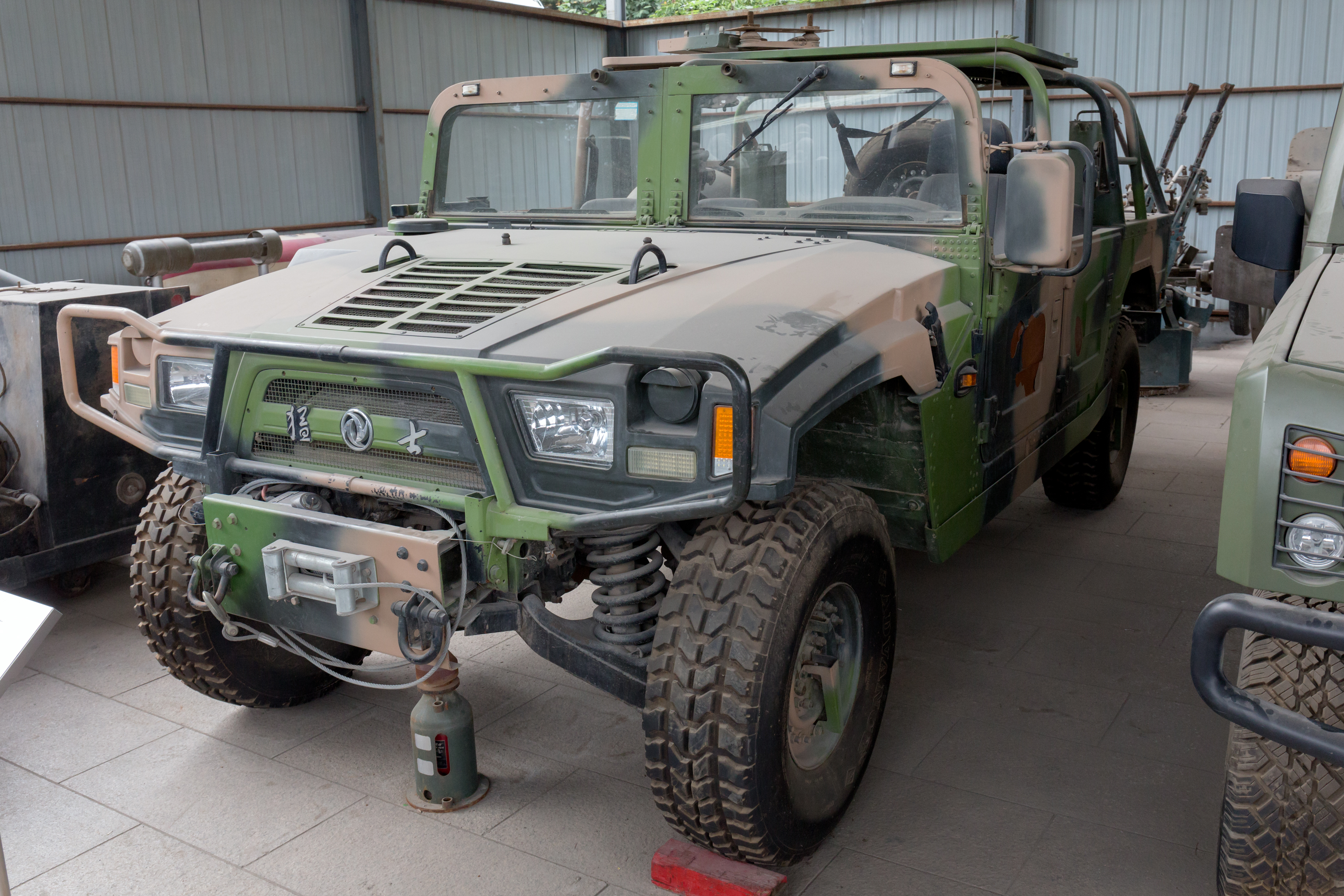
Dongfeng EQ2050/Dongfeng Mengshi

== Production bases and facilities ==
Originating from Hubei province, Dongfeng now has sites throughout China.

=== Dongfeng sites ===
Its primary production base for passenger vehicle manufacture is in Wuhan, capital of Hubei province, with secondary sites in the city of Wenzhou, Zhejiang province. Some commercial vehicles and powertrains are made in Shiyan, Hubei province. Nammi and Dongfeng-Nissan vehicles are produced in Xiangyang, Hubei. In Shenzhen, Dongfeng produces trucks for municipal use, such as garbage collection and street sweeping. In January 2026, it was revealed that Dongfeng was looking to producing passenger cars in Turkey.

== International investments and holdings ==
Stellantis (1.58% of stakes)

- In 2014, Dongfeng Motor Corporation acquired a 14.1% stake in French PSA Group for 800 million euros (equivalent to 6.691 billion RMB).
- In 2019, PSA and FCA reached a merger agreement. In order to facilitate the merger plan, Dongfeng Motor Corporation agreed to sell 30.7 million shares of PSA, reducing its stake from 12.23% to 9.14%.
- In 2021, PSA and FCA completed the merger, and Dongfeng Motor Corporation's PSA shares were converted into shares of Stellantis Group. Dongfeng sold 36.06 million shares of Stellantis at 16.65 euros per share, totaling 600 million euros (approximately 4.677 billion RMB). After the sale, Dongfeng Motor Corporation still held a 4.5% stake in Stellantis Group.
- In January 2022, Dongfeng again sold 40 million shares of Stellantis common stock for a total value of 732 million euros (approximately 5.257 billion RMB). After the transaction, Dongfeng held a 3.16% stake in Stellantis.
- In November 2022, Stellantis repurchased 50 million shares of its common stock from Dongfeng for 934 million euros (approximately 7.276 billion RMB). After the completion of this transaction, Dongfeng's holding of Stellantis common stock reduced to 49.2 million shares, accounting for 1.58% of Stellantis' total share capital.
- Through these four rounds of reducing its holdings in PSA Group and Stellantis Group shares, Dongfeng has generated 18.51 billion RMB cumulative cash by the investment in Stellantis and PSA.

Joint venture with Stellantis in Europe (49% of stakes)

- In May, 2026, Stellantis and Dongfeng announce the plan to establish a Europe-based and Stellantis-led 51/49 joint venture for the sales and distribution of Dongfeng's Voyah-branded vehicles in designated markets in Europe. The joint venture also plans to localize Dongfeng new energy vehicles models in the Rennes plant in France.

Santana Motor

- In May 2025, Zhengzhou Nissan, the subsidiary of Dongfeng, BAIC Group, and Anhui Coronet Tech formed a three-party consortium, deciding to invest 5 million euros to restart the Spanish manufacturer Santana Motor's factory in Linares. Santana would launch the diesel-powered and plug-in hybrid pickup truck based on Dongfeng Z9.

== Overseas activities ==
Dongfeng sells products overseas through various legal arrangements that see mostly light commercial vehicles sold under its own brand name in a variety of formats and specifications.

Foreign countries where Dongfeng has or had a presence include: Pakistan, Malaysia, Myanmar, Paraguay, Philippines, Vietnam, the United Kingdom, and Turkey.

Dongfeng has a joint venture for assembly of commercial trucks with Pakistan's Ghandhara Nissan, whereas it assembles DFSK light commercial vehicles in Pakistan as a joint venture with Regal Automobile Industries Limited

== Sales ==
Dongfeng group sales by brand (Joint-venture brands excluded)
Year	Total	M-Hero	Voyah	eπ Technology			Forthing	eGT	Commercial
Year	Total	M-Hero	Voyah	eπ	Aeolus	Nammi	Forthing	eGT	Commercial
2010	607,068	-	-	-	28,188	-	51,015	-	527,865
2011	654,991	-	-	-	28,000	-	100,678	-	526,313
2012	611,446	-	-	-	60,200	-	136,501	-	414,745
2013	709,470	-	-	-	80,077	-	180,189	-	449,204
2014	715,344	-	-	-	80,107	-	240,899	-	394,338
2015	690,531	-	-	-	94,628	-	250,678	-	345,225
2016	779,298	-	-	-	148,944	-	261,300	-	369,054
2017	810,407	-	-	-	125,018	-	230,378	-	455,011
2018	664,313	-	-	-	95,311	-	128,437	-	440,565
2019	661,585	-	-	-	77,099	-	116,153	-	468,333
2020	725,475	-	-	-	70,180	-	96,340	4,143	554,812
2021	819,172	-	6,791	-	120,320	-	122,168	47,332	522,561
2022	743,032	-	19,409	-	190,587	-	122,300	99,452	311,284
2023	671,702	824	50,285	-	116,971	-	85,680	74,508	343,434
2024	765,242	2,101	80,116	213,405			83,272	34,554	351,794
2025	866,734	10,224	150,169	274,600			83,285	27,068	321,388

== Etymology ==
The name "Dongfeng" which means "East Wind", is taken from Mao Zedong's famous saying "The east wind shall prevail over the west wind", which means that the power of socialism will surely defeat the power of capitalism.

== Brand efforts and sponsorships ==
Dongfeng sponsored the Chinese entry for the 2014–2015 Volvo Ocean Race, a round-the-world sailing race. Dongfeng also sponsored the winning entry in the 2017–18 Volvo Ocean Race.

In June 2025, Dongfeng sponsored Singapore Premier League football club Young Lions as their main sponsor where the brand will appear on the front shirt.

== Controversies ==
Some Dongfeng heavy duty trucks are sold as military vehicles, and limited exports under the name Dongfeng Aeolus have occurred. Dongfeng has, at times, exported military spec vehicles to conflict-ridden nations and places including 400 to Myanmar in 2005 and 200 into Darfur, Sudan, that same year. This precipitated the Government Pension Fund of Norway abstaining from investment in Dongfeng Motor Group for a seven-year period between 2007 and 2014.

== See also ==
- FAW Group
- Changan Group
- Automobile manufacturers and brands of China
- List of automobile manufacturers of China
- Automotive industry in China
