= Shyue Ping Ong =

Singaporean Materials Scientist

- Education: University of Cambridge; Massachusetts Institute of Technology
- Known for: AI for materials science, Computational materials science and design
- Scientific career
- Fields: Materials science Chemistry; Physics
- Workplaces: University of California, San Diego
- Doctoral advisor: Gerbrand Ceder
- Website: materialsvirtuallab.org

Shyue Ping Ong is a Singaporean scientist, who is a professor at the Aiiso Yufeng Li Family Department of Chemical and Nano Engineering at the University of California, San Diego (UCSD). He is known for his research in materials informatics., a field that integrates materials science with data science and artificial intelligence to accelerate the discovery and design of novel materials. His research group, the Materials Virtual Lab, focuses on the development of computational tools and machine learning techniques to predict materials properties and accelerate materials design. He is the founder and lead developer of Python Materials Genomics (pymatgen), an open-source materials analysis code. He is also one of the developers of the Materials Project, a public database of ab initio calculated material properties.

== Career ==
Shyue Ping Ong received a Bachelor of Arts and Master of Engineering degree in Electrical and Information Science from the University of Cambridge in 1999, and a PhD in materials science and engineering from the Massachusetts Institute of Technology in 2011. In 2013, he joined the Aiiso Yufeng Li Family Department of Chemical and Nano Engineering at the University of California, San Diego as an assistant professor. He was promoted to associate professor with tenure in 2017 and subsequently to full professor in 2021. He has published over 150 scientific papers in the fields of AI for materials science, materials software infrastructure, alkali-ion battery materials, solid-state lighting materials, and complex-concentrated (i.e., "high-entropy") materials.

== Research ==
=== AI for Materials Science ===
In 2019, Chi Chen and Shyue Ping Ong showed that graph networks, a machine learning (ML) paradigm that supports both relational reasoning and combinatorial generalization, can be used to accurately predict properties in both molecules and crystals. Such models also learn element embeddings that encode periodic chemical trends, which can be used to train property models property models with smaller amounts of data.

In 2022, Chi Chen and Shyue Ping Ong developed the first universal machine learning interatomic potential (MLIP) with coverage of 89 elements of the entire periodic table. This Materials 3-body Graph Network (M3GNet) combines message-passing graph neural network with three-body interactions and was trained on the database of structural relaxations in the Materials Project. Such models are also referred to as foundation potentials with broad applications in materials discovery and simulations, and has spawned a highly active area of research.

In 2025, Aaron Kaplan, Runze Liu, Ji Qi, Kristin Persson, and Shyue Ping Ong introduced MatPES, a foundational potential energy surface (PES) dataset for training foundation potentials. This effort addresses critical issues with the accuracy of existing PES datasets and allows the training of potentials with far less data. It also introduced the first high-fidelity PES training dataset based on the revised regularized strongly constrained and appropriately normed (r^{2}SCAN) functional with improved descriptions of interatomic bonding.

=== Electrodes and Solid Electrolytes for Alkali-ion Batteries ===
Shyue Ping Ong has made significant contributions in the development of electrodes and solid electrolytes for alkali-ion batteries. Ong's work often involves the use of high-throughput first-principles computational methods, in combination with machine learning techniques.

In 2011, Yifei Mo, Shyue Ping Ong and Gerbrand Ceder used ab initio molecular dynamics simulations to show that the Li_{10}GeP_{2}S_{12} (LGPS) solid electrolyte is essentially a 3-dimensional conductor (not a 1-dimensional conductor as previously assumed) and would have a narrow electrochemical window. In 2013, Shyue Ping Ong and Gerbrand Ceder showed that the Ge in LGPS can be replaced with cheaper Si or Sn without significant impact on its ionic conductivity and electrochemical stability. These predictions were independently validated by experimental studies.

In 2020, Haodong Liu, Zhuoying Zhu, Shyue Ping Ong and Ping Liu developed the disordered rock salt Li3V2O5 fast-charging anode that can reversibly cycle two lithium ions at an average voltage of about 0.6 volts versus a Li/Li+ reference electrode. The low voltage and diffusion barriers of this anode lead to significantly improved energy density and rate performance, and is currently being commercialized by Tyfast.

In 2021, Erik A. Wu, Swastika Banerjee, Ying Shirley Meng, Shyue Ping Ong discovered the Na_{3-x}Y_{1-x}Zr_{x}Cl_{6} (NYZC) ion conductor that is electrochemically stable up to 3.8 V vs. Na/Na+ and chemically compatible with oxide cathodes.

In 2021, Ji Qi and Shyue Ping Ong showed that large-scale MD simulations using MLIPs can be used to overcome the short length and time scales in AIMD simulations, which leads to accurate prediction of the room-temperature ionic conductivities for the Li_{0.33}La_{0.56}TiO_{3}, Li_{3}YCl_{6} and Li_{7}P_{3}S_{11} lithium superionic conductors.

In 2024, Jianbin Zhou, Manas Likhit Holekevi Chandrappa, Shyue Ping Ong and Ping Liu developed a novel S_{9.3}I molecular crystal cathode for low-cost solid-state lithium-sulfur batteries. This new cathode has a much higher electronic conductivity compared to elemental sulfur and can be repaired periodically through heating due to its relatively low melting point of around 65 °C.

=== Solid-state lighting ===
In 2018, Zhenbin Wang and Shyue Ping Ong discovered Sr_{2}LiAlO_{4}, the first known Sr-Li-Al-O quaternary crystal, via data-driven structure prediction and high-throughput screening. Eu^{2+}- and Ce^{3+}-activated Sr_{2}LiAlO_{4} are experimentally confirmed to be green-yellow and blue phosphors, respectively, with excellent thermal quenching resistance.

In 2020, Mahdi Amachraa and Shyue Ping Ong unified the crossover and thermal ionization theories of thermal quenching (TQ) in phosphors into a single predictive model. They showed that TQ under the crossover mechanism is related to the local environment stability of the activator, and a unified model can predict the experimental TQ in 29 known phosphors to within a root-mean-square error of ~3.1−7.6%.

== Community contributions ==
Shyue Ping Ong is the founder and lead developer of Python Materials Genomics (pymatgen), a popular open-source materials analysis code. He is also one of the developers of the Materials Project, an open database of ab initio calculated material properties. He was part of the team that developed much of the early Materials Project infrastructure in 2012-2015, including its application programming interface.

== Awards and honors ==
Shyue Ping Ong is a recipient of the US Department of Energy Early Career Research Program award in 2014 and the Office of Naval Research Young Investigator Program award in 2015. He is also a Clarivate Highly Cited Researcher since 2021.
