= Kristin Persson =

American physicist and chemist

Kristin Aslaug Persson
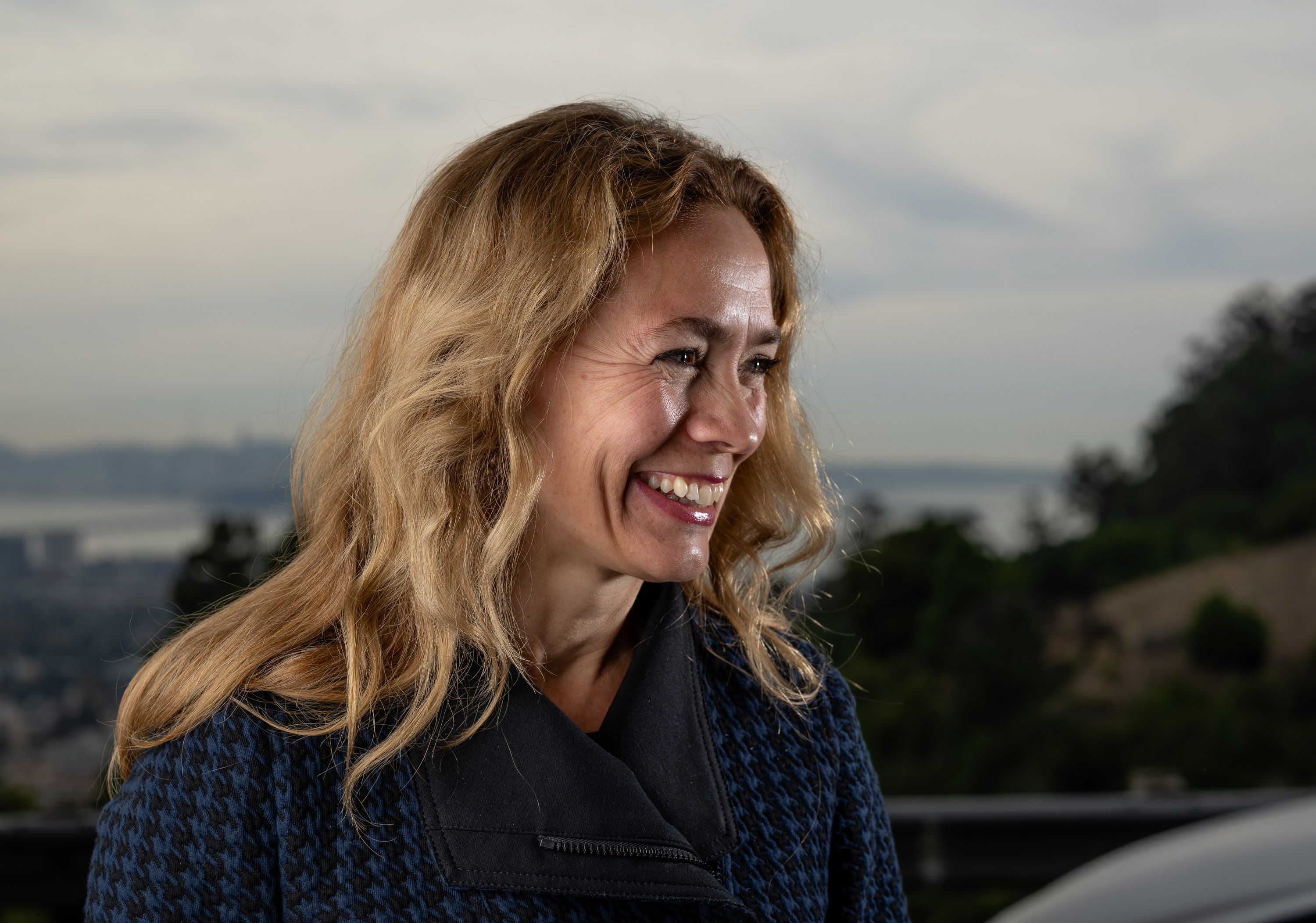
- Education: Lund Institute of Technology; Royal Institute of Technology
- Known for: Materials Project, data-driven materials design
- Scientific career
- Fields: Materials science Chemistry; Physics
- Workplaces: University of California, Berkeley; Lawrence Berkeley National Laboratory
- Thesis: Thermodynamical and Dynamical Instabilities from Ab Initio Electronic Structure Calculations (2001)
- Doctoral advisor: Prof. Göran Grimvall
- Website: perssongroup.lbl.gov

Kristin Aslaug Persson is a Swedish/Icelandic American physicist and chemist. She was born in Lund, Sweden, in 1971, to Eva Haettner-Aurelius and Einar Benedikt Olafsson. She is the Daniel M. Tellep Distinguished Professor of Materials Science and Engineering at University of California, Berkeley and a faculty senior staff scientist at Lawrence Berkeley National Laboratory. Between 2020 and 2024, she served as the director of the Molecular Foundry, a national user facility managed by the US Department of Energy at Lawrence Berkeley National Laboratory. Persson is the director and founder of the Materials Project, a multi-national effort to compute the properties of all inorganic materials. Her research group focuses on the data-driven computational design and prediction of new materials for clean energy production and storage applications. In 2024, Persson was elected a member of the Royal Swedish Academy of Sciences, in the class of Chemistry. She was elected to the National Academy of Engineering in 2025 and to the American Academy of Arts and Sciences in 2026.

== Education ==
Persson holds a Master of Science in engineering physics from Lund Institute of Technology in Sweden and completed a Ph.D. in theoretical physics from Royal Institute of Technology (KTH) in Sweden in 2001, under the supervision of Göran Grimvall. After her Ph.D., she joined the Massachusetts Institute of Technology as a postdoctoral associate from 2001 to 2002. In 2002 she resigned her postdoctoral position to care full-time for her two daughters, born 2000 and 2002. She was rehired at MIT in 2004 and became a Research Associate in 2006. In 2008, Persson joined Lawrence Berkeley National Laboratory as a staff scientist, and in 2015 she became a professor in the Department of Materials Science and Engineering at the University of California, Berkeley.

== Research ==
The Persson Group is a research team that investigates materials' physics and chemistry using advanced computational methods and high-performance computing technology. Their work primarily supports clean energy production and storage applications.

Persson leads the Materials Project,⁣ a collaborative and international initiative that calculates the properties of all inorganic materials. This project provides researchers with free access to the data and related analysis algorithms. The main objective of the Materials Project is to significantly reduce the time required to develop new materials by focusing experimental efforts on compounds that show the most promise based on computational analysis.

Within the Persson Group, researchers apply their expertise in materials informatics and the high-throughput infrastructure of the Materials Project to design innovative materials for various clean energy applications. These materials include photocatalysts, multi-valent battery electrode materials, piezoelectrics, and electrolytes for advanced energy storage solutions. Some of the group's past research has explored the properties of lithium-graphene, phase transformations in high-voltage nickel-manganese spinel, intercalation mechanisms in lithium excess materials, novel oxide photocatalysts, and the correlation between solvation structure and electrolyte performance in multi-valent electrolytes.

The Persson group collaborates with other Materials Project contributors such as Gerbrand Ceder's group, Shyue Ping Ong's group, and Anubhav Jain's group.

== Awards and honors ==
Persson has received numerous honors for her contributions to data-driven materials science and the development of open materials infrastructure. She was elected to the National Academy of Engineering in 2025 for pioneering data-driven materials design and for her leadership of open materials databases. In 2026, she was elected to the American Academy of Arts and Sciences. In 2024, she was named a Distinguished Scientist Fellow by the U.S. Department of Energy Office of Science and was elected a member of the Royal Swedish Academy of Sciences in the class of Chemistry.

She is also a fellow of several scientific societies, including the American Physical Society, the American Association for the Advancement of Science, and the Materials Research Society. Her honors further include the Cyril Stanley Smith Award (2023), multiple U.S. Department of Energy Secretary’s Achievement Awards, and the Falling Walls Award in Science and Innovation Management. She has been named a Highly Cited Researcher by Clarivate for multiple consecutive years (2020-2025).
