= Geoffroy Hautier =

Materials Scientist

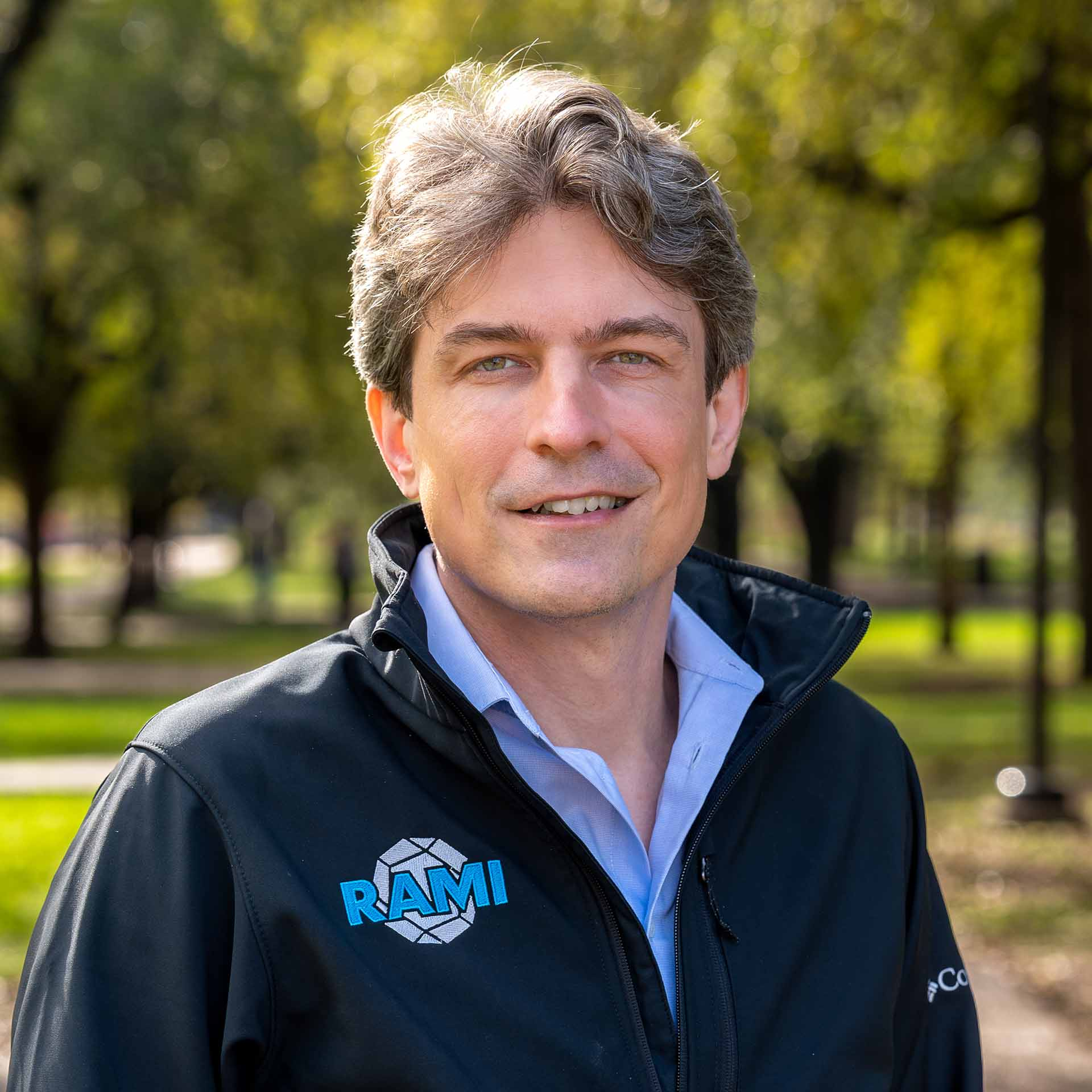
- Geoffroy Hautier in 2025
- Born: Brussels, Belgium
- Occupation: Materials Scientist

Academic background
- Education: Massachusetts Institute of Technology
- Thesis: Lithium-Ion Battery Cathode Materials (2011)
- Doctoral advisor: Gerbrand Ceder

Academic work
- Discipline: Computational materials design
- Institutions: Rice University

Geoffroy Hautier is a researcher and academic specializing in computational materials science and engineering. He is a Trustee Professor of Materials Science and NanoEngineering at Rice University. Prior to joining Rice, he was the Hodgson Family Professor of Engineering at the Thayer School of Engineering at Dartmouth College.

He is one of the early developers and co-principal investigators of the Materials Project.

== Education ==
Hautier completed dual master’s degrees in 2004, earning an M.S. in Engineering from École Centrale Paris in France and an M.S. in Materials Science and Engineering from the Université Libre de Bruxelles in Belgium. He earned a Ph.D. in Materials Science and Engineering from the Massachusetts Institute of Technology (MIT) in 2011, where he conducted doctoral research under the supervision of Gerbrand Ceder. His doctoral research focused on the use of high-throughput ab initio calculations to accelerate the discovery of functional inorganic materials.

== Career ==
After completing his Ph.D. degree, Hautier conducted postdoctoral research and later held a faculty position at UCLouvain in Belgium, where his work focused on computational materials science and high-throughput materials discovery. He is one of the early developers and co-principal investigators of the Materials Project, a large-scale, open-access computational database that provides information on the properties of thousands of materials and supports materials discovery worldwide.

In October 2020, Hautier joined Dartmouth College as the Hodgson Family Associate Professor of Engineering at the Thayer School of Engineering. He was promoted to full professor and appointed Hodgson Family Professor of Engineering in 2024.

In 2025, Hautier joined Rice University as a Trustee Professor of Materials Science and NanoEngineering and became a faculty fellow of the Rice Advanced Materials Institute. His research at Rice focuses on high-throughput ab initiocalculations, machine learning–based approaches to materials discovery, and the design of functional inorganic materials for optoelectronic, thermoelectric, and quantum applications.

In addition to his academic appointments, Hautier is a co-founder and Chief Scientific Officer of Matgenix, a company applying computational and machine-learning methods to materials discovery and optimization for industrial applications. He also serves as an Associate Editor of npj Computational Materials.

== Awards ==
- American Physical Society Fellow (2025)
