= Rizia Bardhan =

Indian origin American biomolecular engineer

- Education: Westminster College (Missouri); Rice University
- Scientific career
- Workplaces: Iowa State University; Vanderbilt University; Molecular Foundry
- Thesis: Nanostructures for plasmon enhanced fluorescence sensing: From photophysics to biomedicine (2010)

Rizia Bardhan is an Indian origin American biomolecular engineer who is the Jean H. Steffenson Professor of chemical and biological engineering at Iowa State University. She is an executive editor of ACS Applied Materials & Interfaces.

== Early life and education ==
Bardhan was an undergraduate student in chemistry at Westminster College and graduated in 2005. She moved to Rice University for her graduate studies, where she worked under the supervision of Naomi Halas. Bardhan completed her doctoral research at Rice, where she studied nanostructures for plasmonic enhancement. When these nanostructures are excited using light they can enhance the fluorescence signatures of nearby molecules. When molecules were 7 nm from the surface of these nanostructures, it was possible to generate an enhancement of 50 times of the fluorescent signal. After earning her doctorate, Bardhan was appointed a research fellow at the Molecular Foundry.

== Research and career ==
Bardhan joined the faculty at Vanderbilt University in 2012. Her research considered nanomedicine and nanophotonics. In particular, Bardhan studied new imaging modalities for identifying immunomarkers, metabolic imaging using Raman spectroscopy, examinations of the mechano-molecular model of nanomaterials and the mechanisms that underpin photothermal immunotherapies.

In 2020, Bardhan joined the faculty at the Iowa State University as an associate professor of chemical and biological engineering. She was awarded over $2 million in funding from the National Institutes of Health for her biomedical engineering program. Bardhan combined her experience creating plasmonic nanostructures with her understanding of immunomarkers to better predict who will respond well to immunotherapy. The approach combined immunoactive gold nanostructures with positron emission tomography and Raman spectroscopy, detecting tumour cells that were expressing a particular biomarker as well as immune cells.

Bardhan was made associate editor of ACS Applied Materials & Interfaces in 2021.

== Awards and honors ==
- 2012 Forbes 30 Under 30
- 2013 National Science Foundation BRIGE Award
- 2014 Oak Ridge Associated Universities Ralph E. Powe Junior Faculty Enhancement Award
- 2020 Westminster College 40 Years, 40 Women Honorees

== Selected publications ==
- Jonathan A Fan; Chihhui Wu; Kui Bao; et al. (1 May 2010). "Self-assembled plasmonic nanoparticle clusters". Science. 328 (5982): 1135–1138. Bibcode:2010Sci...328.1135F. doi:10.1126/science.1187949. ISSN 0036-8075. PMID 20508125. Wikidata Q58221820.
- Rizia Bardhan; Surbhi Lal; Amit Joshi; Naomi J Halas (25 May 2011). "Theranostic nanoshells: from probe design to imaging and treatment of cancer". Accounts of Chemical Research. 44 (10): 936–946. doi:10.1021/ar200023x. ISSN 0001-4842. PMC 3888233. PMID 21612199. Wikidata Q34187209.
- Rizia Bardhan; Nathaniel K Grady; Joseph R Cole; Amit Joshi; Naomi J Halas (1 March 2009). "Fluorescence enhancement by Au nanostructures: nanoshells and nanorods". ACS Nano. 3 (3): 744–752. doi:10.1021/nn900001q. ISSN 1936-0851. PMID 19231823. Wikidata Q51810019.
