= Aigul Solovyova =

Kazakhstani politician (born 1952)

Aigul Sagadibekovna Solovyova (born January 17, 1952) — Kazakhstani state and public figure. Since December 2017, she has been the Chairperson of the Board of the "Association of Ecological Organizations of Kazakhstan."

== Early life and education ==
Aigul Solovyova was born on January 17, 1952, in Kargaly village, Zhambyl District, Almaty Region.

In 1975, she graduated from the Chemistry Department of the Kazakh State University named after S. M. Kirov, specializing as a "chemistry teacher."

From 1983 to 1986, she studied by correspondence in postgraduate school and defended her dissertation for the degree of Candidate of Technical Sciences at the St. Petersburg Technological Institute, specializing in "Technology of refractory non-metallic compounds."

== Career ==
Between 1975 and 1979, Solovyova worked at the Institute of Chemical Sciences of the Academy of Sciences of the Republic of Kazakhstan as a senior laboratory assistant, engineer, and senior engineer in the Laboratory of Oxide Melts. From 1979 to 1993, she held positions as a junior, senior, and leading researcher at the Research Institute of Building Materials Project (NIIsstromproject) in the Laboratory of Physical Chemistry of Silicates. During this period, she also served as the scientific secretary of the Candidate and Doctoral Dissertation Councils for the "Technology of Refractory and Non-Metallic Materials."

In 1981, Solovyova became chairperson of the Council of Young Scientists and Specialists at NIIsstromproject, a role she held until 1983. Subsequently, from 1983 to 1987, she chaired the Republican Scientific and Technical Committee of the Council of Young Scientists and Specialists under the Central Committee of the Leninist Young Communist League of Kazakhstan.

From 1993 to 2007, Solovyova was the general director of LLP "Basalt-Int." She also became actively involved in business associations, serving as chairperson of the Atyrau Branch of the Association of Businesswomen of Kazakhstan from 1998 to 2002. Additionally, from 2000 to 2003, she chaired the Association of Milk and Dairy Products Producers of Kazakhstan and later co-chaired the Dairy Union of Kazakhstan from 2003 to 2006. Since December 2017 Solovyova chairs the board of the Association of Ecological Organizations of Kazakhstan.

Solovyova has been a member of the Coordination Council of the "National Chamber of Entrepreneurs 'Atameken'" since 2005 and the chairperson of the Coordination Council of the "Civil Alliance of Kazakhstan" since 2006. In June 2002, she joined the Expert Council under the Government for the Development of Small and Medium Businesses. Since 2003, she has served as a member of the National Council of the Republic of Kazakhstan and has also participated in the Entrepreneurs’ Forum of Kazakhstan.

In June 2002, she joined the Expert Council under the Government for the Development of Small and Medium Businesses. Since 2003, she has served as a member of the National Council of the Republic of Kazakhstan and has also participated in the Entrepreneurs’ Forum of Kazakhstan.

From November 2006 to April 2013, Solovyova held the position of president of the Civil Alliance of Kazakhstan. Between November 20, 2007, and 2013, she was a member of the Council of the Public Chamber under the Mäjilis of the Parliament of the Republic of Kazakhstan.

Additionally, from 2007 to 2014, she served as a member of the National Commission on Women’s Affairs and Family-Demographic Policy under the president of the Republic of Kazakhstan.

=== Political activity ===
Solovyova served as a deputy of the Mäjilis of the Parliament of the Republic of Kazakhstan during its IV convocation from August 27, 2007, to November 16, 2011. During this tenure, she was a member of the Committee on Economic Reform and Regional Development. From January 18, 2012, to January 20, 2016, she was re-elected as a deputy of the Mäjilis of the Parliament of the Republic of Kazakhstan for its V convocation. During this period, she was a member of the Presidium of the "Nur Otan" Party Fraction and participated as a member of the Economic Policy Council under the "Nur Otan" Fraction.

== Awards and honors ==
- 2002: Medal "10 Years of Independence of the Republic of Kazakhstan."
- 2004: Medal "For Distinguished Labor" ("Ерен Еңбегі үшін") by the president of the Republic of Kazakhstan.
- 2006: Medal "10 Years of the Parliament of the Republic of Kazakhstan."
- 2008: Medal "10 Years of Astana."
- 2011: Medal "20 Years of Independence of the Republic of Kazakhstan."
- 2011: "Order of Kurmet" by the president of the Republic of Kazakhstan.
- 2015: Medal "20 Years of the Constitution of the Republic of Kazakhstan."
- 2018: Jubilee Medal "20 Years of Astana."
