= Maria Chan =

American materials scientist

Maria Kai Yee Chan
- Education: University of California, Los Angeles (BS); Massachusetts Institute of Technology (PhD)
- Known for: AI/ML for materials design; Integration of modeling and characterization; Development of FANTASTX for structure determination
- Awards: DOE Early Career Award (2020); Sam Bader Award (2022); APS Fellow (2024)
- Scientific career
- Fields: Materials science Computational materials science Materials informatics Machine learning
- Workplaces: Argonne National Laboratory
- Thesis: Atomistic and ab initio prediction and optimization of thermoelectric and photovoltaic properties (2009)
- Doctoral advisor: Gerbrand Ceder; John Joannopoulos
- Website: Official website

Maria Kai Yee Chan is an American materials scientist at the Argonne National Laboratory. Her research involves the applications of machine learning to nanomaterials and renewable energy, including the prediction of material properties, the integration of computational modeling with x-ray, electron, and scanning probe characterization, and the retrieval of microscopy and spectroscopy data from the published literature.

Chan became interested in physics at age 11 after reading a book about relativity. She has a bachelor's degree in physics and applied mathematics from the University of California, Los Angeles, and a Ph.D. in physics from the Massachusetts Institute of Technology. Her 2009 dissertation, Atomistic and ab initio prediction and optimization of thermoelectric and photovoltaic properties, was jointly supervised by Gerbrand Ceder and John Joannopoulos. She joined the Argonne National Laboratory as a postdoctoral researcher before continuing there as a staff researcher.

At Argonne, Chan works in the Center for Nanoscale Materials and develops approaches that combine atomistic simulations with experimental characterization. She is a senior fellow of the Northwestern–Argonne Institute for Science and Engineering and a fellow of the University of Chicago Consortium for Advanced Science and Engineering. She also serves as an associate editor of Chemistry of Materials and sits on advisory boards for APL Machine Learning, Duke University's aiM-NRT program, and the CEDARS Energy Frontier Research Center. As part of a DOE Early Career Award, she led the development of FANTASTX, a framework for determining atomic structures from x-ray, electron, and scanning probe measurements.

She was elected as a Fellow of the American Physical Society (APS) in 2024, after a nomination from the APS Topical Group on Energy Research and Applications, "for contributions to methodological innovations, developments, and demonstrations toward the integration of computational modeling and experimental characterization to improve the understanding and design of renewable energy materials".
