= Voyah Free =

Mid-size luxury crossover SUV

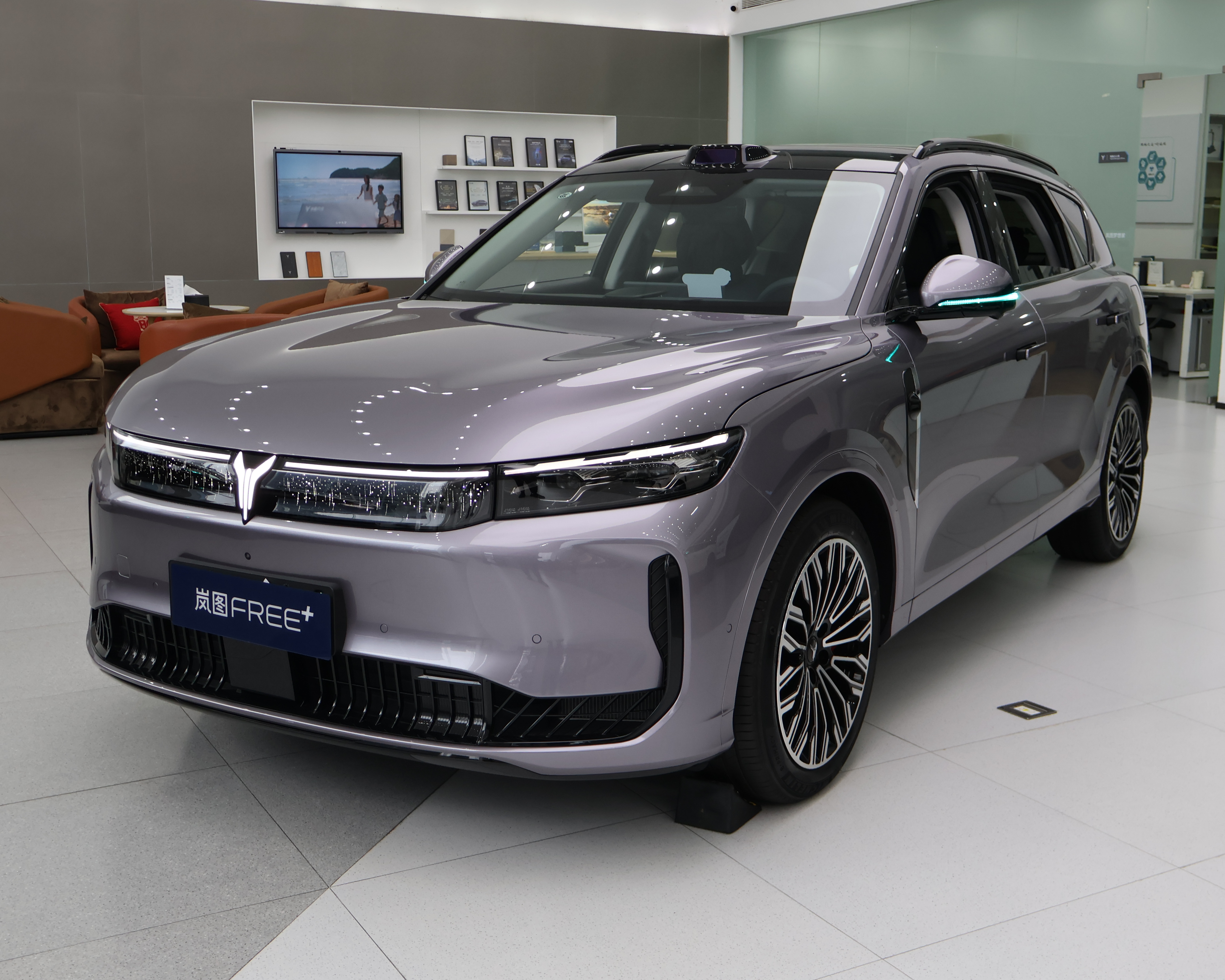
- Voyah Free+

Overview
- Manufacturer: Voyah
- Also called: Rabdan One (UAE)
- Production: January 2021 – present

Body and chassis
- Class: Mid-size luxury crossover SUV (E)
- Body style: 5-door SUV
- Platform: Electric Smart Secure Architecture (ESSA)
- Related: Voyah Courage; Voyah Dream; Voyah Passion

The Voyah Free (Chinese: 岚图FREE; pinyin: Lántú FREE) is a battery electric and plug-in hybrid mid-size luxury crossover SUV produced by Dongfeng under the Voyah brand.

Introduced to the Chinese market in the third quarter of 2021, it was designed alongside Italdesign Giugiaro. It was showcased first as a concept car during the 2020 Beijing Auto Show. The vehicle is based on Dongfeng's Electric Smart Secure Architecture (ESSA) platform, which offers multiple premium features such as adaptive suspension and driving assistance functions.

Voyah offered a high-performance limited-edition model called as the Voyah Free DNA, which features higher power output and exterior modifications.

The second generation, sometimes marketed as the Voyah Free+, was introduced in July 2025 and features significant integration of Huawei infotainment and ADAS systems and is available exclusively in a range extender electric powertrain.

== First generation (2021) ==
First generation
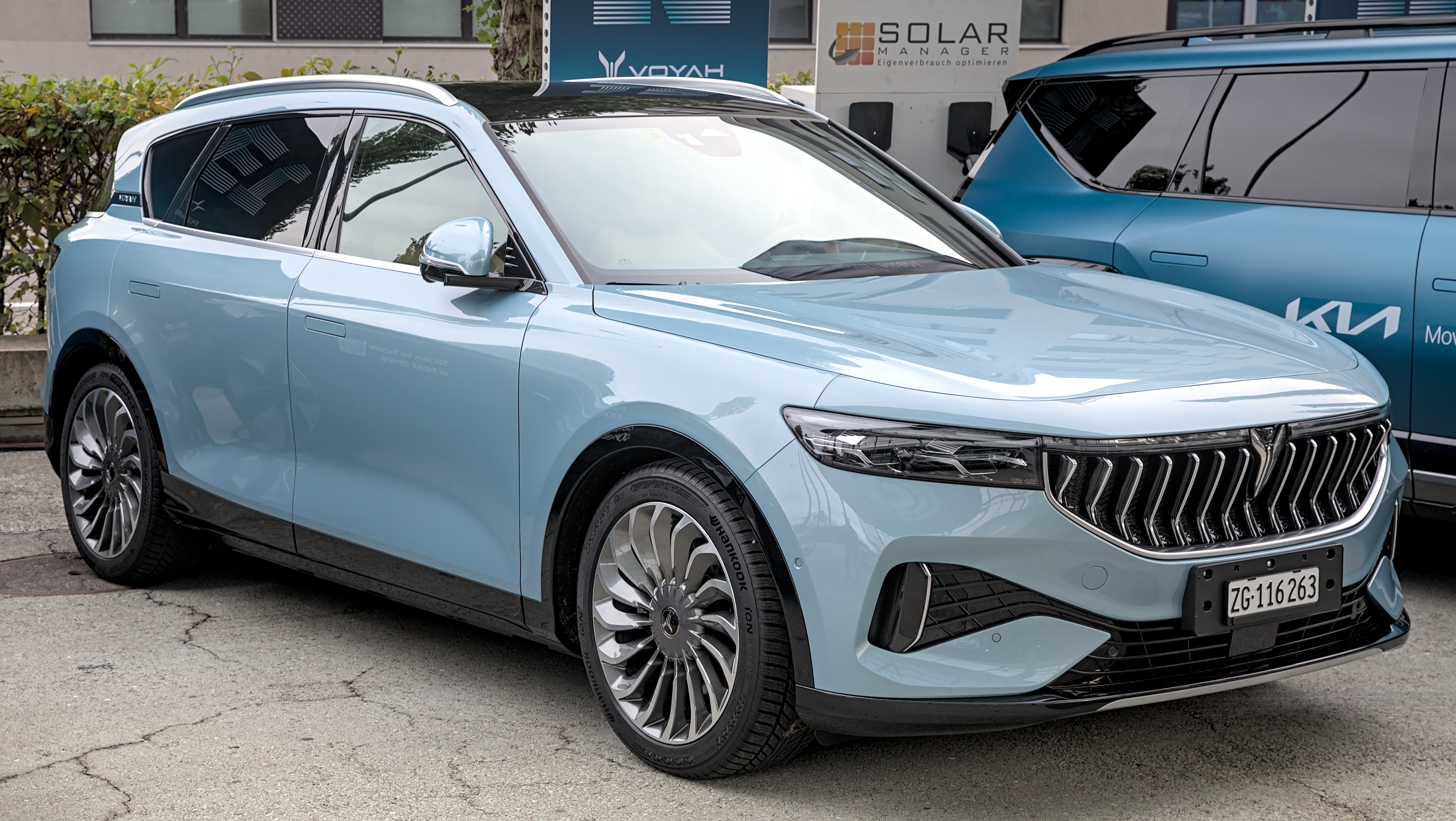

Overview
- Also called: Rabdan One (UAE)
- Production: January 2021 – 2025
- Assembly: China: Wuhan; Russia: Lipetsk; UAE: Abu Dhabi
- Designer: Italdesign Giugiaro

Body and chassis
- Layout: Battery electric: Rear-motor, rear-wheel-drive; Dual-motor, all-wheel-drive; Range-extended EV: Front-engine, rear-motor, rear-wheel-drive; Front-engine, dual-motor, all-wheel-drive
- Platform: Electric Smart Secure Architecture (ESSA)

Powertrain
- Engine: Petrol range extender: 1.5 L SC15TDR I4 turbo; 1.5 L DAM15NTDE I4 turbo (318)
- Electric motor: 2×1XM AC permanent magnet synchronous
- Transmission: 1-speed direct-drive
- Hybrid drivetrain: Series hybrid range extender
- Battery: 33 kWh; 39 kWh; 43 kWh NMC CATL; 88 kWh; 106.4/106.7 kWh
- Electric range: 475–631 km (295–392 mi) (EV); 205–318 km (127–198 mi) (EREV)

Dimensions
- Wheelbase: 2,955 mm (116 in)
- Length: 4,905 mm (193 in)
- Width: 1,950 mm (77 in)
- Height: 1,690 mm (66.5 in)
- Curb weight: 2,190–2,330 kg (4,828–5,137 lb)

The Voyah Free was initially showcased as the Voyah i-Free Concept during the 2020 Beijing Auto Show in September 2020 by Voyah, a NEV brand under Dongfeng Motor. The production Free was co-designed with Italdesign Giugiaro. On 18 December 2020, Voyah officially launched its first model, the Free. This vehicle is offered in two power configurations: extended range and pure electric. The NEDC comprehensive cruising range stands at 860 kilometres (530 mi) for the extended range model and 500 kilometres (310 mi) for the pure electric variant.

The Voyah Free is constructed on Dongfeng Electric Smart Secure Architecture (ESSA) platform. Its suspension system combines front double wishbones and rear multi-links, utilising all-aluminum subframes and connecting rods for chassis components. High-end models feature air suspension, automatically lowering during the transition to high-energy driving mode, with collaborative efforts from companies Bosch and Nio Inc.

Equipped with L2 advanced automatic driving assistance functions, the Voyah Free incorporates three millimeter wave radars as sensing hardware. Additionally, the vehicle features 9 cameras and 12 ultrasonic radars to facilitate driving assistance functions, including full-speed adaptive cruise control, lane-keeping assist, automatic braking, 360° panoramic imaging, and blind-spot monitoring. Additionally, an active night vision system, effective within 150 metres (490 ft) in front, identifies pedestrians and animals. Series production began in late January 2021.

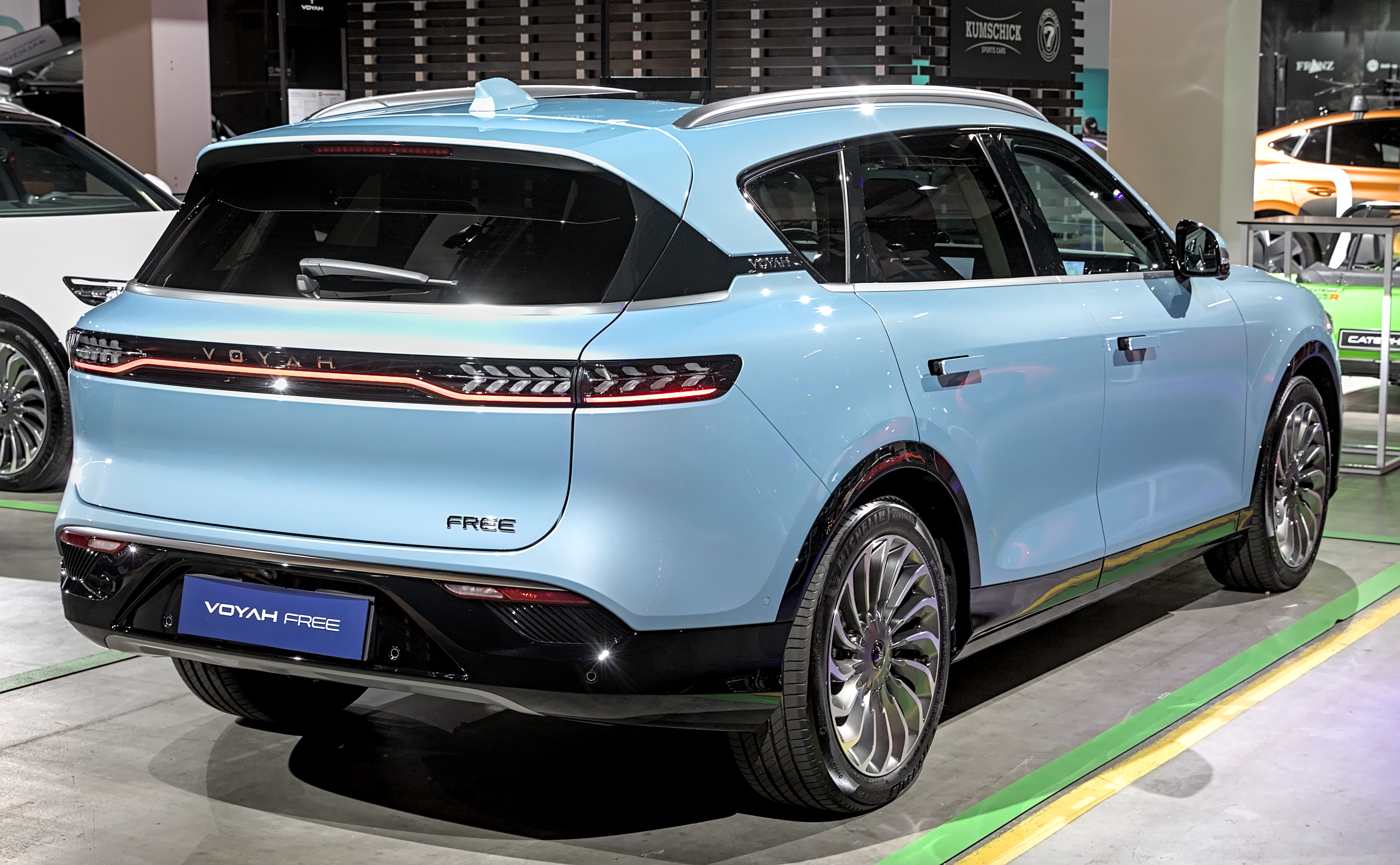
Rear view

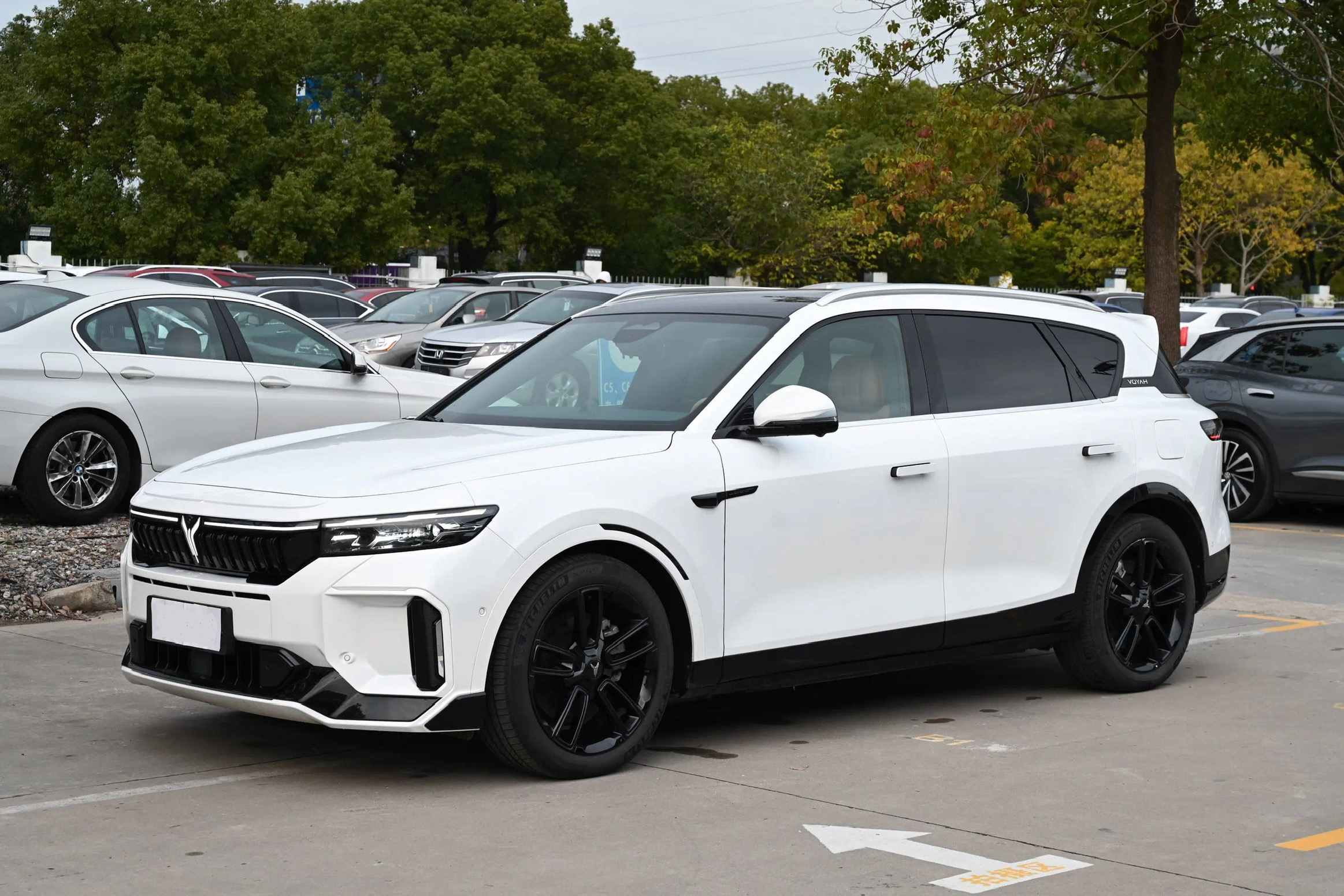
Voyah Free 2023 (facelift)

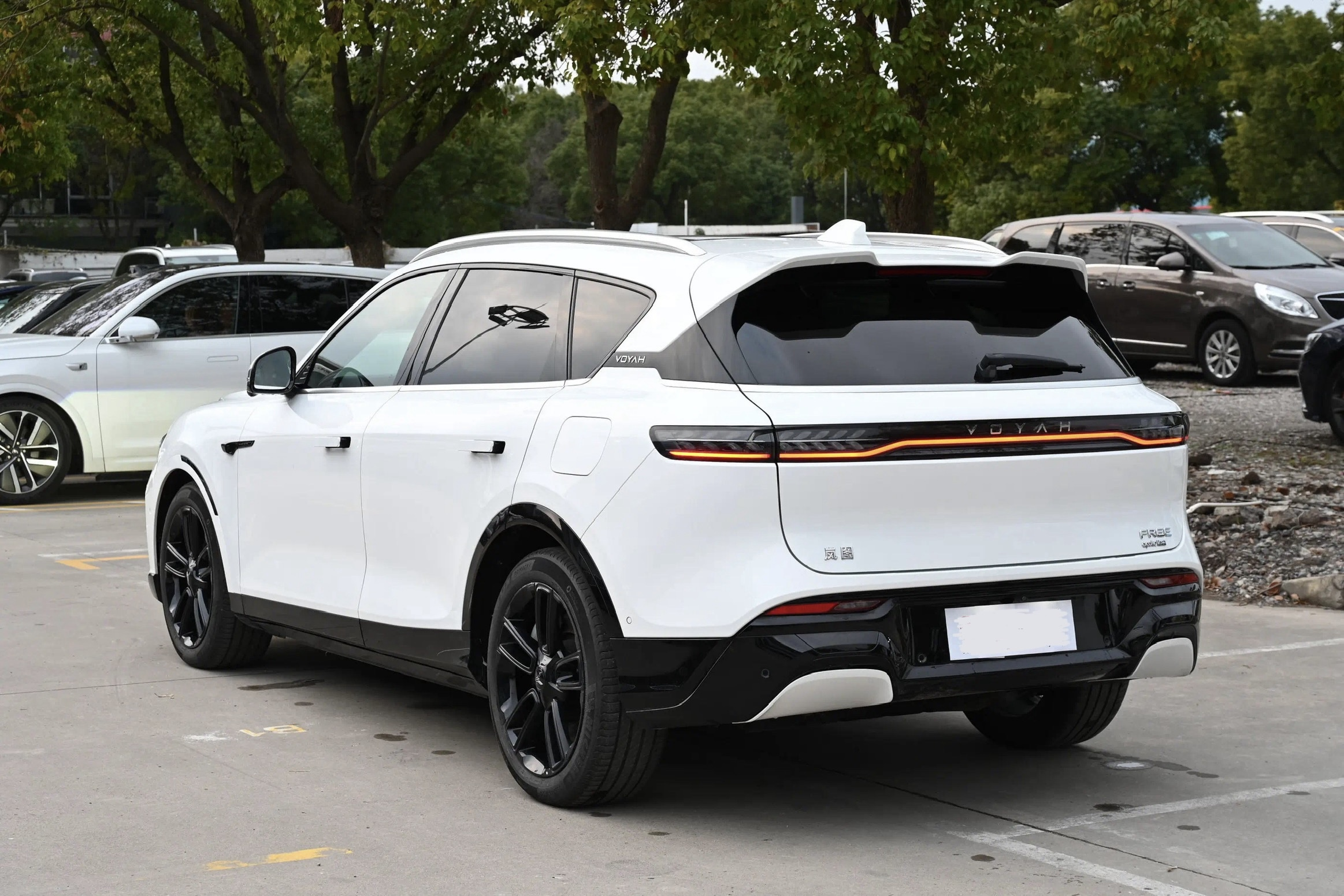
Rear view

=== Specifications ===
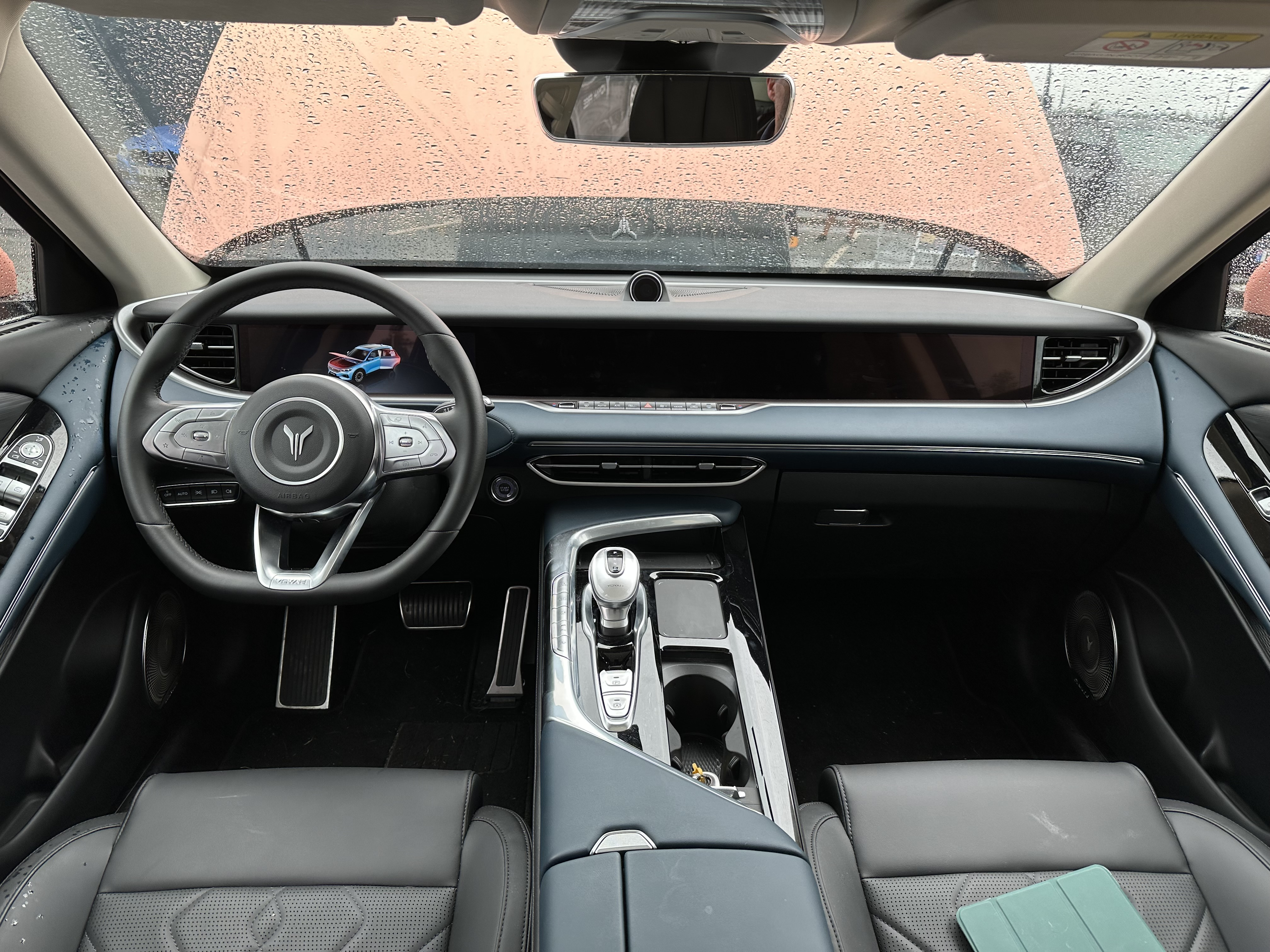
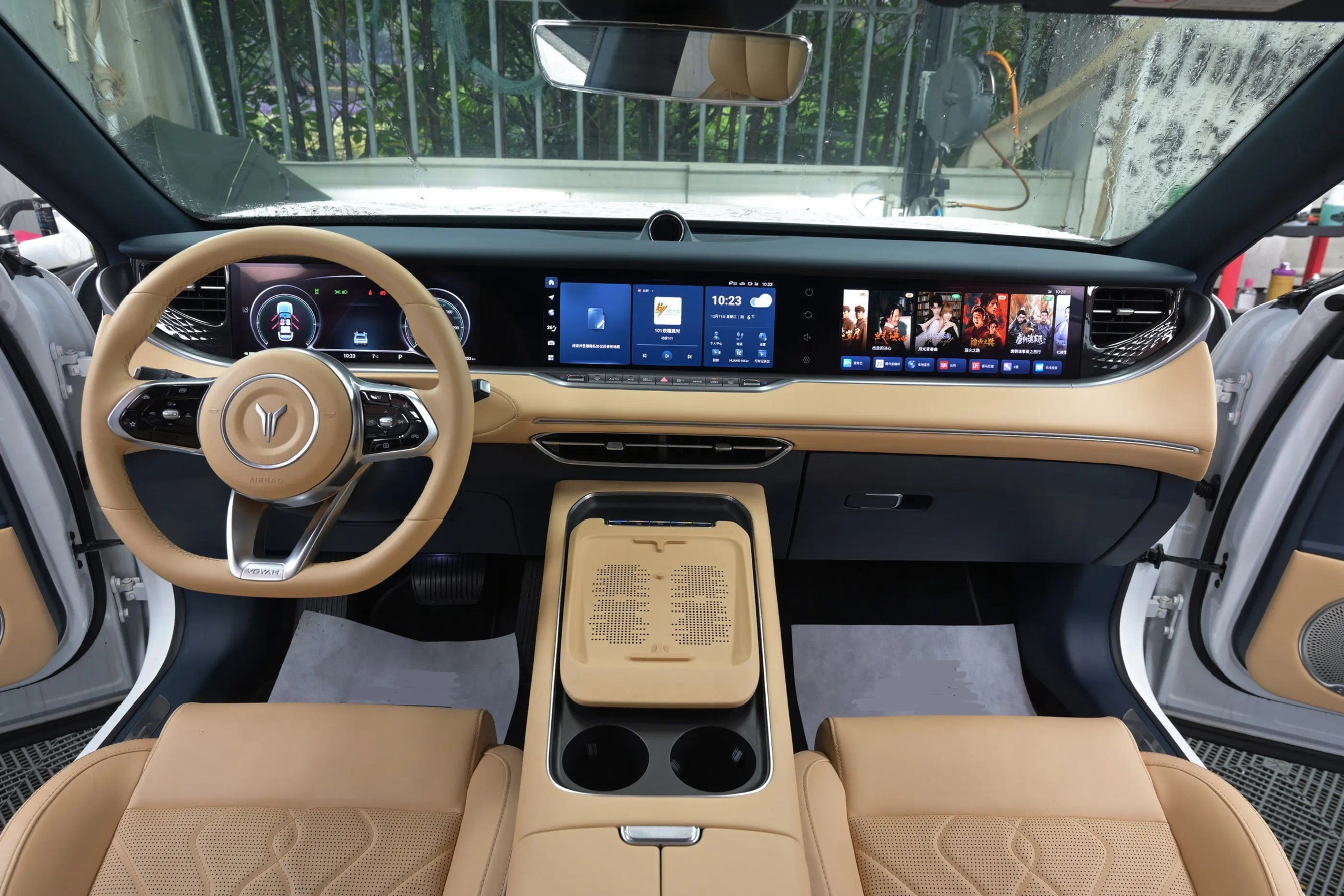
The Voyah Free interior as the pre-facelift (left) and facelift (right)

Power in the extended range version comes from a 1.5-litre turbocharged 4-cylinder range extender and 500 kW (671 hp; 680 PS) from electric motors. The range extender is the Dongfeng C15TDR series engine with a thermal efficiency of 41.07% with a rated power of 60 kW (80 hp; 82 PS) and peak power of 80 kW (107 hp; 109 PS). The NEDC comprehensive cruising range of the extended-range model is 860 kilometres (530 mi). The combined maximum power of the extended-range model is 500 kW (671 hp; 680 PS) and the peak torque is 1,000 N⋅m (738 lb⋅ft), total rated power of the electric motors is equal to the maximum 30 minute power and is 174 kW (233 hp; 237 PS). The 0–100 km/h (0–62 mph) acceleration takes 4.6 seconds for the range-extended model, and the maximum speed is 200 km/h (120 mph).

In the all-electric variant, the battery capacity is 88kWh or 106.4/106.7 (the net capacity is 100kWh) in the Long Range model. The NEDC comprehensive cruising range is 500 kilometres (310 mi), and 0–100 km/h (0–62 mph) acceleration takes 4.8 seconds. The Voyah Free 4WD model is equipped with a front and rear motor with a combined maximum power of 510 kW (684 hp; 693 PS) and peak torque of 1,040 N⋅m (767 lb⋅ft).

The electric model was discontinued in August 2023, leaving the extended-range model as the only available option.

=== Voyah Free DNA ===
Voyah Free DNA is a limited-edition model based on the Voyah Free featuring even higher performance numbers and a special body kit. The Voyah Free DNA achieves higher performance than the regular 4WD model, with a 0–100 km/h (0–62 mph) acceleration time of 4.3 seconds. It is equipped with a dual motor all-wheel drive system with a comprehensive maximum power of 510 kW (684 hp; 693 PS) and a peak torque of 1,040 N⋅m (767 lb⋅ft), total rated power of the electric motors is equal to the maximum 30 minute power and is 178 kW (239 hp; 242 PS). The top speed of the Voyah Free DNA is 200 km/h (120 mph), and the braking distance from 100–0 km/h (62–0 mph) is 33.8 metres (111 ft; 37.0 yd).

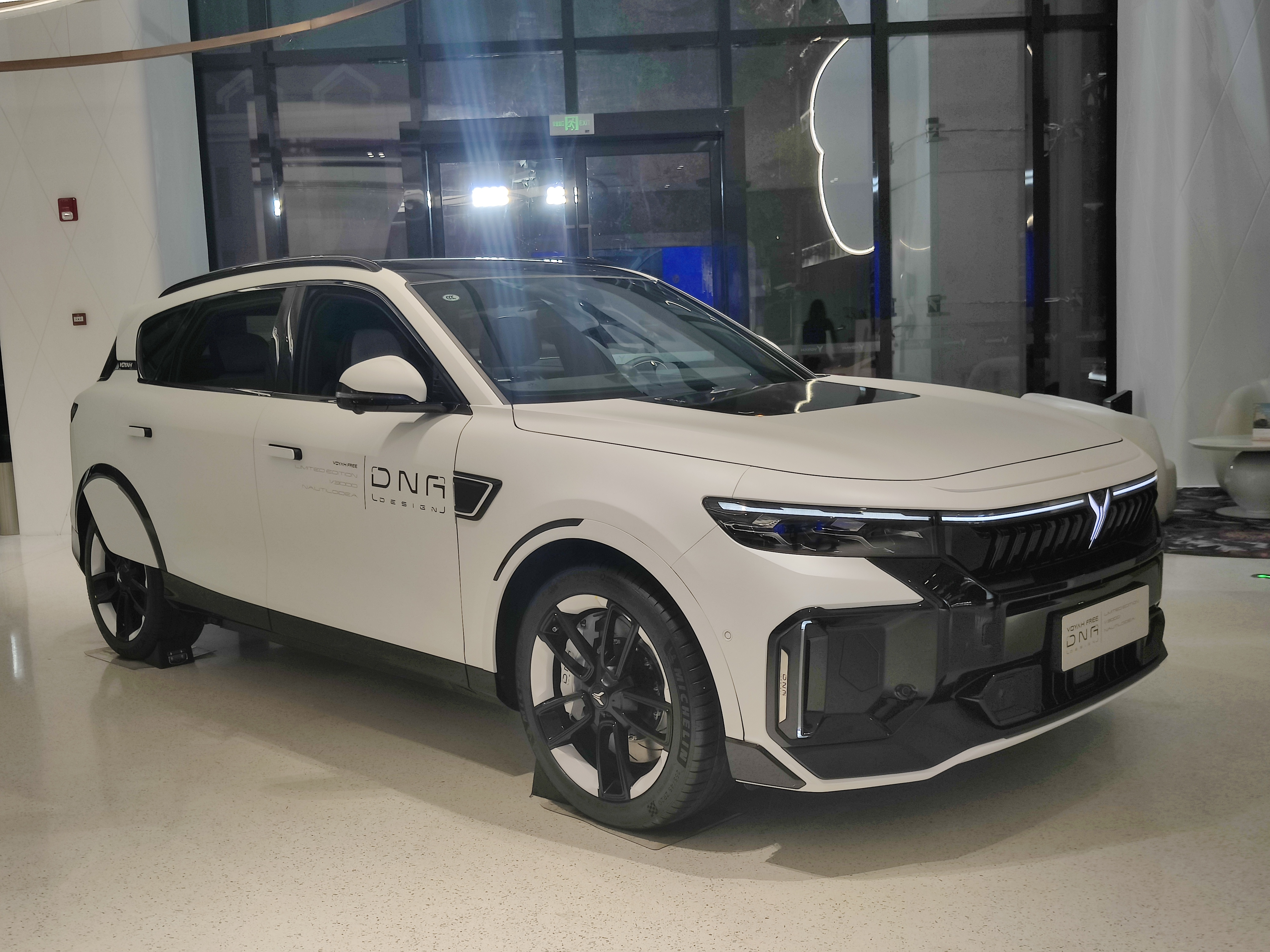
Voyah Free DNA

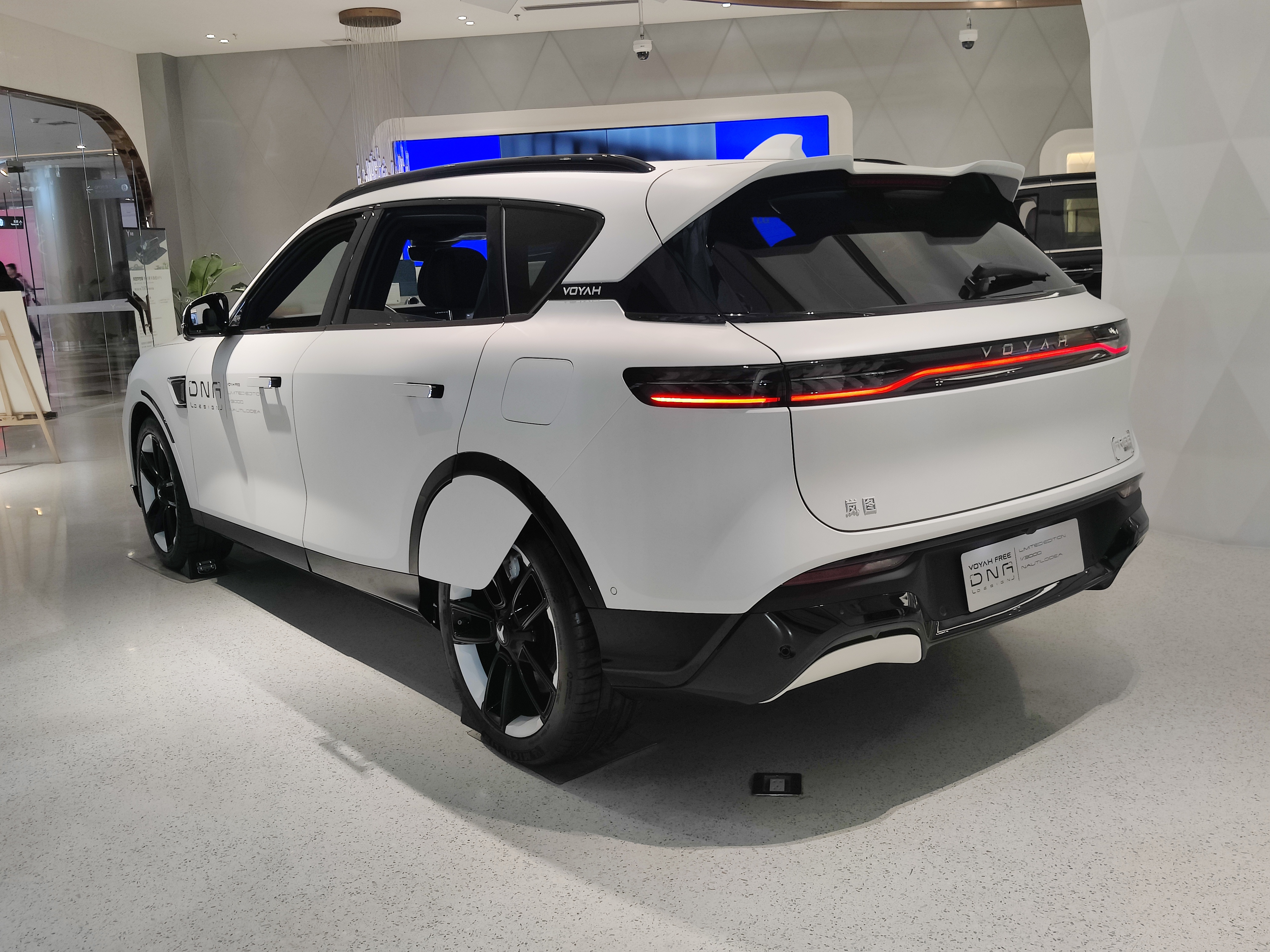
Rear view

Voyah Free plug-in hybrid (EREV) specifications
Model	Cal. years	Layout	Engine code	Displ.	Power	Torque	Combined system output	Electric motor	Battery	Trans.
Standard /DNA	2021-2023	AWD	SC15TDR	1,498 cc (1.5 L) I4 turbocharged 80 kW (107 hp; 109 PS)	Front: 255 kW (342 hp; 347 PS) Rear: 255 kW (342 hp; 347 PS)	Front: 520 N⋅m (384 lb⋅ft) Rear: 520 N⋅m (384 lb⋅ft)	510 kW (684 hp; 693 PS) / 1,040 N⋅m (767 lb⋅ft)	Permanent magnet synchronous	33 kWh lithium-ion	1-speed reduction gear
Standard /DNA	2023-2025	AWD	SC15TDR	1,498 cc (1.5 L) I4 turbocharged 110 kW (148 hp; 150 PS), 220 N⋅m (162 lb⋅ft)	Front: 160 kW (215 hp; 218 PS) Rear: 200 kW (268 hp; 272 PS)	Front: 310 N⋅m (229 lb⋅ft) Rear: 410 N⋅m (302 lb⋅ft)	360 kW (483 hp; 489 PS) / 720 N⋅m (531 lb⋅ft)	Permanent magnet synchronous	39 kWh lithium-ion	1-speed reduction gear
318	2025	RWD	DAM15NTDE	1,498 cc (1.5 L) I4 turbocharged 110 kW (148 hp; 150 PS), 220 N⋅m (162 lb⋅ft)	Rear: 200 kW (268 hp; 272 PS)	410 N⋅m (302 lb⋅ft)	200 kW (268 hp; 272 PS) / 410 N⋅m (302 lb⋅ft)	Permanent magnet synchronous	43 kWh lithium-ion NCA	1-speed reduction gear

Voyah Free EV specifications
Cal. years	Layout	Range (NEDC)	Power	Torque	Combined system output	Electric motor	Battery	Trans.
2021-2023	RWD	505 km (314 mi)	255 kW (342 hp; 347 PS)	520 N⋅m (384 lb⋅ft)	255 kW (342 hp; 347 PS)	Permanent magnet synchronous	88 kWh lithium-ion	1-speed reduction gear
2023-2025	AWD	475 km (295 mi)	Front: 255 kW (342 hp; 347 PS) Rear: 255 kW (342 hp; 347 PS)	Front: 520 N⋅m (384 lb⋅ft) Rear: 520 N⋅m (384 lb⋅ft)	510 kW (684 hp; 693 PS) / 1,040 N⋅m (767 lb⋅ft)	Permanent magnet synchronous	88 kWh lithium-ion	1-speed reduction gear
2025	AWD	631 km (392 mi)	Front: 163 kW (219 hp; 222 PS) Rear: 203 kW (272 hp; 276 PS)	Front: 310 N⋅m (229 lb⋅ft) Rear: 410 N⋅m (302 lb⋅ft)	365 kW (489 hp; 496 PS) / 720 N⋅m (531 lb⋅ft)	Permanent magnet synchronous	106 kWh lithium-ion	1-speed reduction gear

== Second generation (2025) ==
Second generation
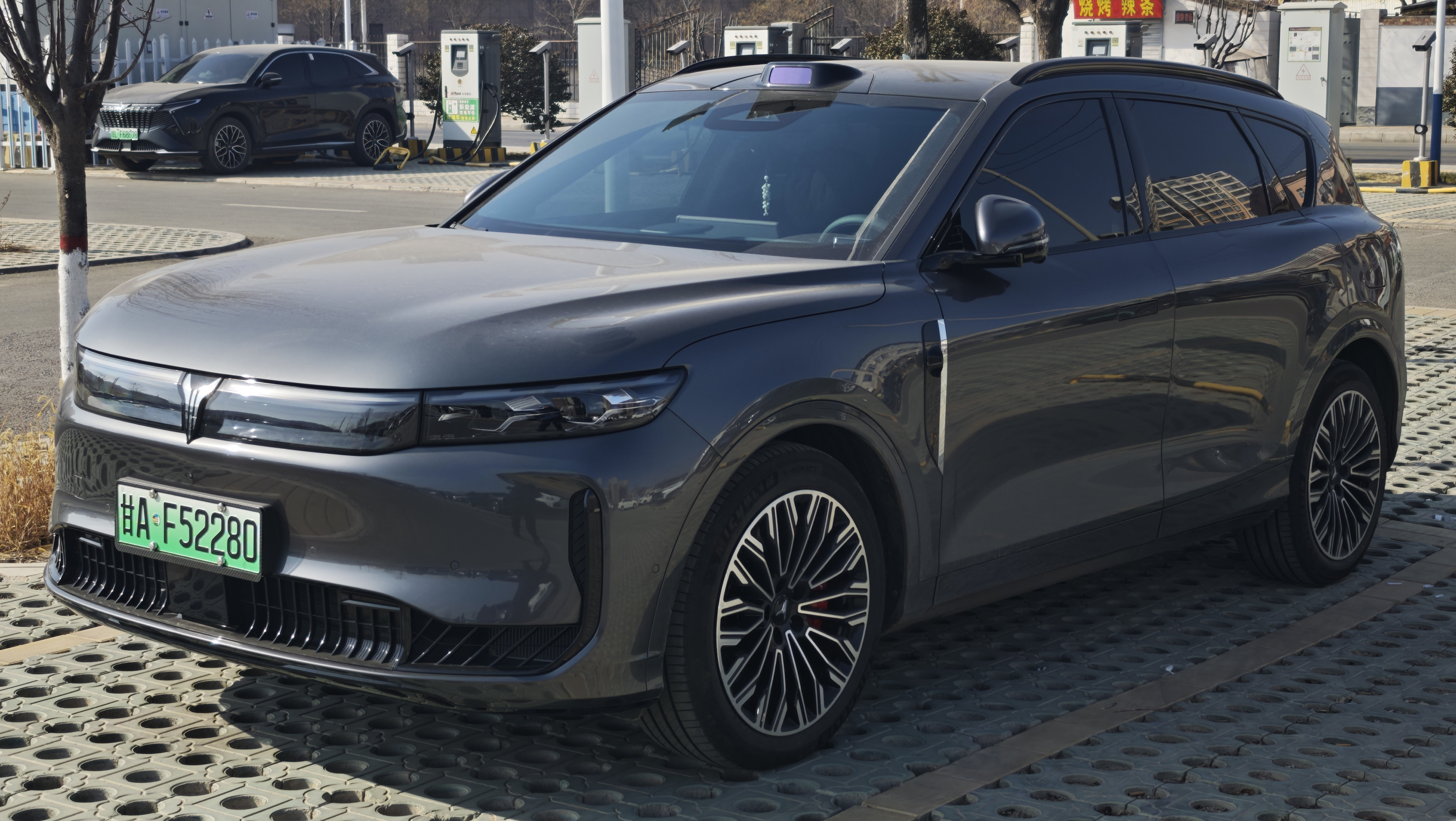

Overview
- Also called: Voyah Free+
- Production: 2025–present
- Assembly: China: Wuhan

Body and chassis
- Platform: Electric Smart Secure Architecture (ESSA)

Powertrain
- Engine: Petrol range extender: 1.5 L DAM15NTEDU I4 turbo
- Power output: 215–360 kW (288–483 hp; 292–489 PS)
- Battery: 43.2 kWh LFP CATL
- Range: 1,357–1,458 km (843–906 mi) (CLTC)
- Electric range: 196–235 km (122–146 mi) (WLTP)
- Plug-in charging: V2L: 6 kW

Dimensions
- Wheelbase: 2,960 mm (117 in)
- Length: 4,915 mm (193.5 in)
- Width: 1,960 mm (77 in)
- Height: 1,645–1,660 mm (64.8–65.4 in)
- Curb weight: 2,250–2,350 kg (4,960–5,180 lb)

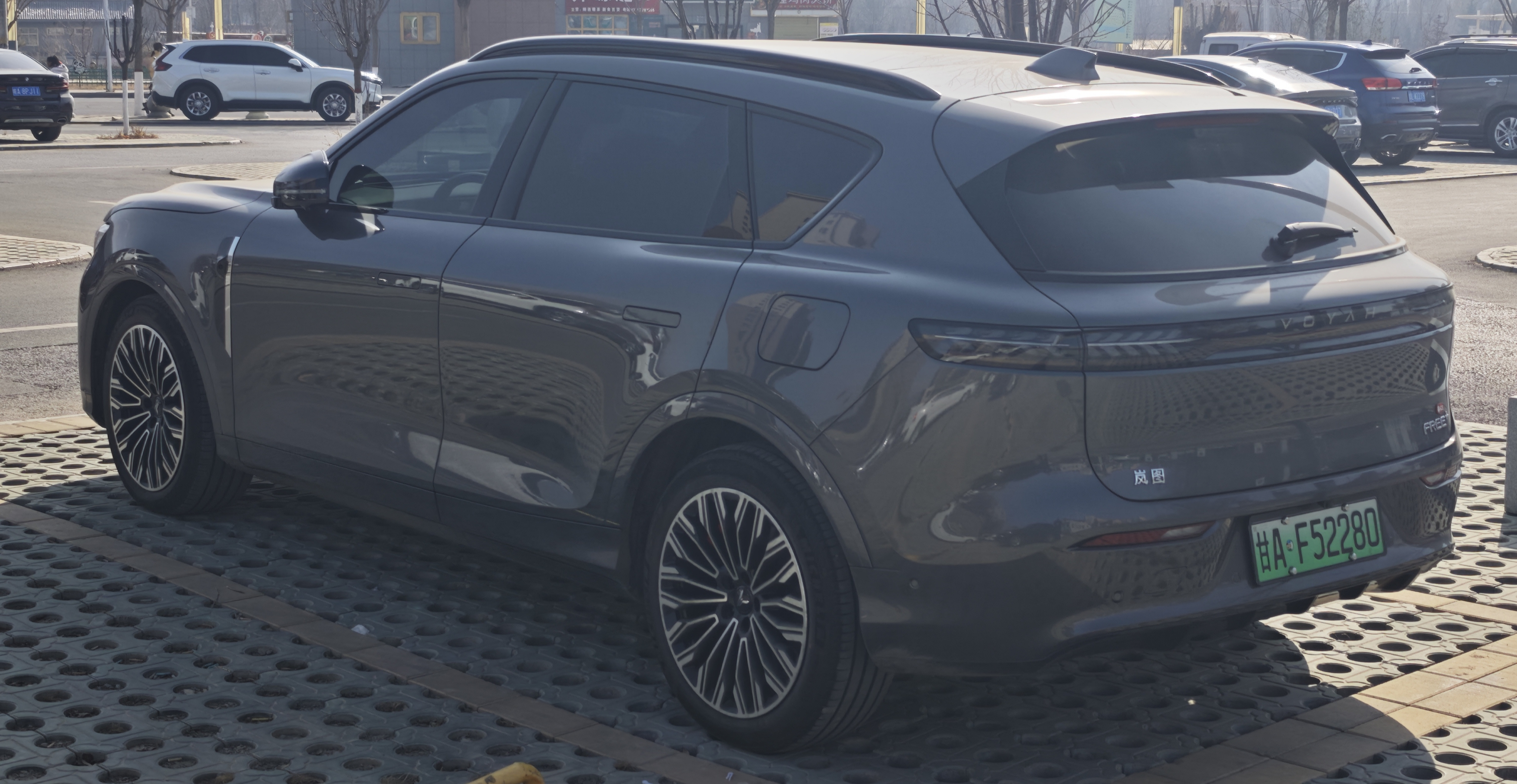
Rear view

The second generation Voyah Free, initially marketed as the Voyah Free+ (stylized as FREE^{+}), was first revealed at Auto Shanghai 2025.

The exterior uses the 'City Light and Shadow Aesthetics' design language, and the length and width have grown 10 mm (0.39 in), while the wheelbase is 5 mm (0.20 in) longer. It will receive Huawei's ADS 4 Advanced driver-assistance system and will use Harmony Space 5 for its infotainment system.

The interior features a 10.25-inch digital instrument cluster supplemented by a 29-inch AR-HUD and a 15.6-inch 2K central infotainment touchscreen, along with a rear control touchscreen for rear passengers, all of which run on Huawei's HarmonySpace 5 cockpit system. All seats have heating and ventilation functions, and the front passenger seat can recline up to 163° and has a four-way adjustable legrest, while the rear seatbacks can recline up to 39°. The center console has 50-watt active cooled wireless charging pads and has a 7 L (0.25 cu ft) refrigerator located in the rear which can be set between −6–50 °C (21–122 °F). It has a 22-speaker Huawei Sound system and a 1.78 m^{2} (19.2 sq ft) panoramic sunroof. It has a 590 L (21 cu ft) rear cargo area, which expands to 1,450 L (51 cu ft) with the rear seats folded down.

The Free+ is one of the first to be equipped with a Huawei's ADS 4.0 system, which has a 29-sensor suite including one 192-line LiDAR, three 4D mmWave radars, 2 conventional mmWave radars, 11 cameras, and 12 ultrasonic sensors. It enables ADAS functions such as L2 semiautonomous assisted driving in highway and urban conditions and automatic emergency braking from up to 130 km/h (81 mph).

=== Powertrain ===
It is available exclusively with a range extender electric powertrain, which uses a 1.5-liter turbocharged inline-four petrol engine generator which outputs 127 hp (95 kW; 129 PS) and is not mechanically connected to the wheels, combined with an LFP battery chosen for increased safety with a capacity of 43.2 kWh. Rear-wheel drive variants use a 215 kW (288 hp; 292 PS) motor and have 318 km (198 mi) of CLTC electric range. Dual-motor models add an additional 135 kW (181 hp; 184 PS) motor to the front wheels for a total of 350 kW (469 hp; 476 PS) for a range rating of 259 km (161 mi). The battery is capable of 3C charging, allowing it to recharge from 20–80% in 20 minutes.

Variant	Battery	Engine	Power			Range (CLTC)		Range (WLTP)	Top speed	Weight
Variant	Battery	Engine	Front	Rear	Total	EV	Total	EV	Top speed	Weight
EREV RWD	43.2 kWh LFP	1.5 L I4 turbo 95 kW (127 hp; 129 PS)	—	215 kW (288 hp; 292 PS)		318 km (198 mi)	1,458 km (906 mi)	235 km (146 mi)	180 km/h (112 mph)	2,250 kg (4,960 lb)
EREV AWD	43.2 kWh LFP	1.5 L I4 turbo 95 kW (127 hp; 129 PS)	135 kW (181 hp; 184 PS)	215 kW (288 hp; 292 PS)	350 kW (469 hp; 476 PS)	259 km (161 mi)	1,357 km (843 mi)	196 km (122 mi)	200 km/h (124 mph)	2,350 kg (5,181 lb)

== Sales ==
The second generation Free received 11,583 firm orders within 15 minutes of its launch on 12 July 2025.

Year	China		Total
Year	EV	EREV	Total
2022	3,456	8,380	11,826
2023	512	9.322	9.834
2024	142	13,066	13,208
2025	17	29,799	29,816
