= DRX =

DRX may refer to:

- Desktop Replacement Extreme, a laptop made by Falcon Northwest
- Discontinuous reception, a method in mobile communication
- DRX (esports), a South Korean esports organization
- Dynamic recrystallisation, a metallurgical phenomenon
- Disordered rock salts, a class of materials with potential uses in batteries
