= MDMC (disambiguation) =

MDMC, commonly called methylone, is an empathogen and stimulant psychoactive drug.

MDMC may also refer to:

- Material Data Management Consortium, see Materials data management
- MDMC/EDMA, a psychedelic drug first synthesized by Alexander Shulgin
- Osvaldo Virgil Airport (ICAO: MDMC), Monte CristiDominican Republic
