= Gerbrand Ceder =

Belgian–American scientist

- Education: KU Leuven (BA); University of California, Berkeley (PhD)
- Awards: 2017 National Academy of Engineering; 2016 International Battery Award Research; 2016 MRS Materials Theory Award; 2015 MRS Fellow; 2009 MRS Gold Medal; 2007 MIT School of Engineering Graduate Teaching Award; 2004 ECS Battery Research Award
- Scientific career
- Fields: Computational materials science Computational materials design
- Workplaces: University of California, Berkeley
- Doctoral advisor: Didier de Fontaine
- Doctoral students: Maria Chan; Shirley Meng; Shyue Ping Ong
- Website: ceder.berkeley.edu

Gerbrand Ceder is a Belgian–American scientist who is a professor and the Samsung Distinguished Chair in Nanoscience and Nanotechnology Research at the University of California, Berkeley and a Co-Founder of Radical AI, a company focused on developing advanced materials with AI and automation. He has a joint appointment as a senior faculty scientist in the Materials Sciences Division of Lawrence Berkeley National Laboratory. He is notable for his pioneering research in high-throughput computational materials design, and in the development of novel lithium-ion battery technologies. He is co-founder of the Materials Project, an open-source online database of ab initio calculated material properties, which inspired the Materials Genome Initiative by the Obama administration in 2011. He was previously the founder and CTO of Pellion Technologies (having initially been CEO), which aimed to commercialize magnesium-ion batteries. In 2017 Gerbrand Ceder was elected a member of the National Academy of Engineering, "For the development of practical computational materials design and its application to the improvement of energy storage technology."

== Education and career ==
Gerbrand Ceder received an engineering degree in Metallurgy and Applied Materials Science from the KU Leuven, Belgium, in 1988, and a PhD in materials science from the University of California at Berkeley in 1991, at which time he joined the faculty at Massachusetts Institute of Technology (MIT). He was the R.P. Simmons Professor of Materials Science and Engineering at the Massachusetts Institute of Technology for 25 years, after which he moved back to the U. C. Berkeley, where he remains. His research group focuses on the use of computational modeling to design novel materials for energy generation and storage, including battery cathodes, hydrogen storage materials, thermoelectrics, and electrodes for solar photoelectrochemical water-splitters. His group also designs, synthesizes and characterizes novel lithium-ion and sodium-ion battery chemistries. He has published over 400 scientific papers in the fields of alloy theory, oxide phase stability, high-temperature superconductors, Li-battery materials, machine learning, and theory of materials synthesis, and holds 25 current or pending U.S. patents.

== Research ==
=== Li-ion Batteries Cathode Materials ===
In 2006, Kisuk Kang and Gerbrand Ceder using ab initio computational modeling, for identifying useful strategies to design higher rate battery electrodes and applied them on lithium nickel manganese oxide $\ce{Li(Ni_{0.5}Mn_{0.5})O_2}$. The authors demonstrated how $\ce{Li(Ni_{0.5}Mn_{0.5})O_2}$ in its layered crystal structure (synthesized from ion exchange method) out-performed the rate capability of the state-of-the art layered $\ce{LiCoO2}$ cathode material.

In 2009, ByungWoo Kang and Gerbrand Ceder demonstrated that the lithium-ion battery cathode material LiFePO_{4} could undergo ultrafast charging and discharging (~10 sec full discharge).

In 2014, Jinhyuk Lee and Gerbrand Ceder demonstrated that when the Li content surpasses the percolation threshold, disordered rocksalt structures can deliver high discharge capacity (>300 mAh/g) and energy density (>1000 Wh/kg). The discovery opens up new opportunities for Nickel and cobalt free cathode materials for Li-ion batteries and significantly lowers the cost of cathode materials.

=== Solid State Ionic Conductors ===
Gerbrand Ceder has made significant contributions in the field of ionic superconductors which have application as electrolytes in solid-state batteries. Most of Ceder's works involve the use of first-principles based computational methods for understanding the atomic scale mechanism and design principles of conductors. In 2011, Yifei Mo, S.P. Ong and Gerbrand Ceder used ab-initio molecular dynamics simulations to clarify how the state-of-the art conductor $\ce{Li10GeP2S12}$ (LGPS) is essentially a 3-dimensional conductor (as opposed to the previously presumed 1D conduction mechanism), which bypasses the inevitable detrimental effects of blocking defects observed in 1D conduction mechanisms. In 2015, Ceder and his co-authors identified the overarching structural feature in many superionic conductors such as LGPS. The authors showed that the anion arrangement is the key factor in determining intrinsic Li-ion mobility and body-centered cubic (bcc) anion sublattice is most desirable for achieving high ionic conductivity, as it allows direct Li hops between adjacent tetrahedral sites. In 2016, Ceder and co-authors presented a computational prediction, discovery and synthesis of $\ce{Na10SnP2S12}$ which has a has a room temperature ionic conductivity of 0.4 mS cm^{−1}, which rivals the conductivity of the best sodium sulfide solid electrolytes to date

In 2022, Ceder and co-authors made a major breakthrough in understanding the structural features leading to high ionic conductivity in the relatively safer and more stable class of oxide conductors. The authors showed that oxides (which typically do not crystallize in the favorable BCC anion frameworks like sulfides), can promote super-ionic conductivity in anion frameworks with corner-sharing connectivity despite the poor screening ability of oxides compared to sulfides.

In 2022, Gerbrand Ceder, Yan Zheng, Bin Ouyang, and co-authors demonstrated another mechanism for boosting ionic conductivity in oxide conductors. The authors showed how high-entropy compositions in Na super ionic conductor (NASICON) material and garnets can create local structural distortions that enhance alkali ion mobility. In 2023, Ceder and co-authors outlined important design principles in NASICON materials, associating performance to features such as optimal Na content, polyanion chemistry, cation size and silicate content. In 2024, Gerbrand Ceder and co-authors have demonstrated design strategies for Li superionic conductivity in fcc based oxides (traditionally not been considered suitable for solid-state electrolytes) by achieving cation over-stoichiometry in rocksalt-type lattices via excess Li in the composition. Other recent significant contributions from Gerbrand in this field include detailed computational study of atomic scale mechanisms in $\ce{Li3PS4}$ and the emerging clay-like superionic conductors.

Gerbrand Ceder has also made contributions in experimental efforts to identify failure mechanisms associated with solid-state electrolyte production.

=== Autonomous Materials Discovery ===
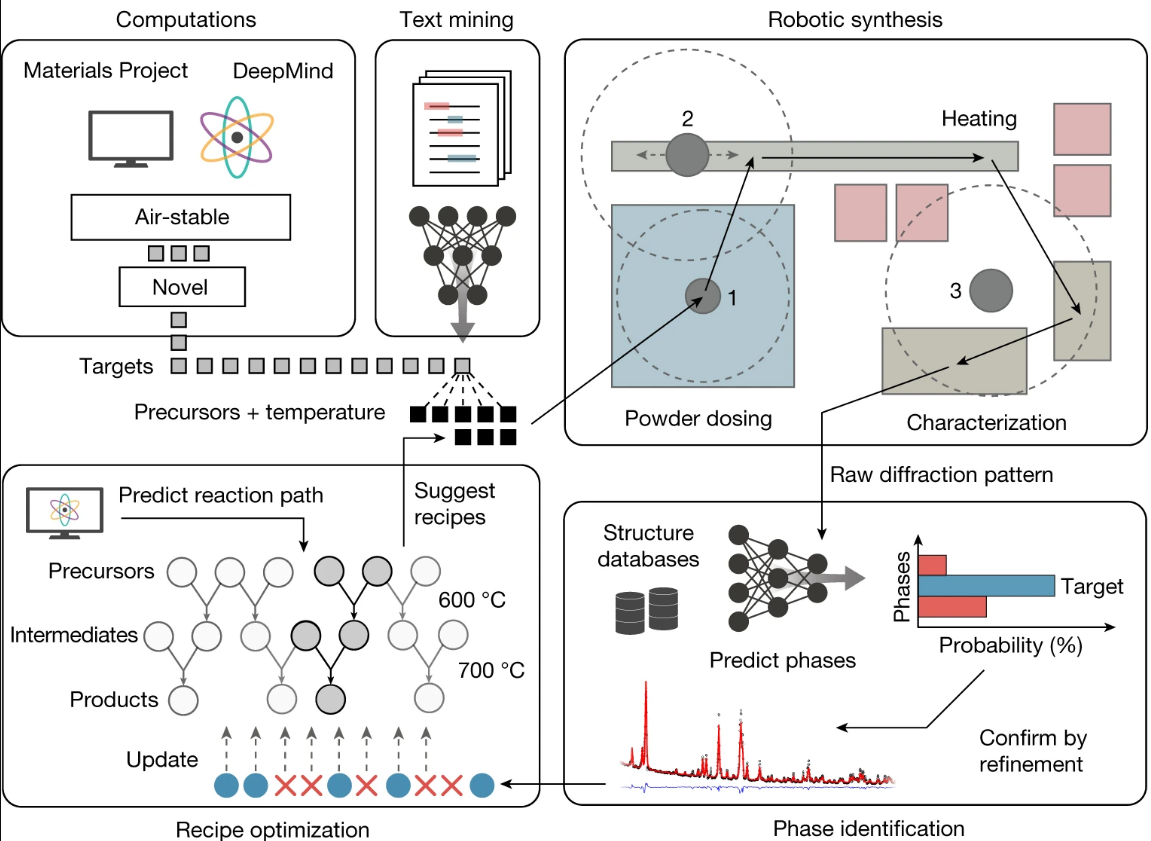
A-lab process involves identifying air-stable materials using DFT and the Materials Project, proposing synthesis recipes via ML models trained on literature data, and automating the entire process from dosing to characterization using a robotic laboratory, with iterative improvements based on ML analysis of XRD.

In November 2023, Ceder and colleagues introduced A-Lab, an autonomous laboratory for inorganic powder synthesis, integrating computations, machine learning, and robotics. The work garnered significant attention based on the claim it successfully synthesized 41 out of 58 novel compounds, primarily oxides and phosphates, over 17 days. The A-lab used graph neural networks trained on computational materials databases and literature-trained natural language models for initial synthesis recipe proposals, optimized through active learning based on thermodynamics.

In January 2023, a preprint scrutinized the accuracy of autonomous material discovery methods used in Szymanski et al. paper. They argue the initial claim of 43 new materials via A-lab, faces issues with automated Rietveld analysis in X-ray diffraction and neglected material disorder, leading to Palgrave et al.'s conclusion that no new materials were discovered. The preprint stresses the need for improved approaches to using AI tools and computational models. Prior to the preprint criticism by Palgrave online was addressed by Ceder in a LinkedIn post refuting many critiques made against the A-lab paper.

== Awards and honors ==
Professor Ceder is an elected Fellow of the Materials Research Society (MRS), the American Physical Society (APS), The Minerals, Metals & Materials Society (TMS), and the Electrochemical Society (ECS). In 2017, he was elected to the US National Academy of Engineering for "For the development of practical computational materials design and its application to the improvement of energy storage technology". He is also a member of the American Academy of the Arts and Science (2022) and a Fellow of the Royal Flemish Academy of Arts and Sciences (2016).

As a young faculty member at MIT he received multiple awards for his work, including an National Science Foundation Early Career Award and the TMS Robert Lansing Hardy Award for from The Minerals, Metals & Materials Society for "exceptional promise for a successful career" (1996). In 1999 he was also appointed to the Res Metallica Chair of his alma mater, the K.U. Leuven.

Professor Ceder's work on energy storage materials include the Battery Research Award from the Electrochemical Society in 2004, the Research Award from the International Battery Association in 2017, and in 2009 the Materials Research Society (MRS) Gold Medal "For pioneering the high-impact field of first-principles thermodynamics of batteries materials and for the development of high-power density Li battery compounds".

For his work on developing materials theory and computational materials science he received the MRS Materials Theory Award in 2016, and in 2019 the National Institute for Materials Science (NIMS – Japan) Award for Data-driven Materials Research. In 2023 he was awarded the Hume Rothery Award from TMS for "seminal contributions to theory and predictive computational methods for complex multicomponent alloys and ceramic solid solutions, and pioneering advances for ab-initio materials design". Most recently he was honored with the Charles Hatchett Award for the productive use of Nb in energy storage materials. Other awards include the TMS Morris Cohen Award (2016) and the Alexander M. Cruickshank Award at the 2015 Gordon Conference.

== See also ==
- Materials informatics
