= Disordered rock salt =

Class of materials

A sample crystal structure of DRX LMT-055, a disordered rock salt with the formula Li_{1.0}Mn_{0.5}Ti_{0.5}O_{2}. The lithium (white), manganese (green), and titanium (blue) atoms are randomly distributed within the crystal lattice, with oxygen (red) counter-ions.

Disordered rock salts (DRX) are a class of materials bearing the rock salt crystal structure with a disordered arrangement of cations. They are most notable for their potential uses in lithium-ion battery cathodes.

== Structure ==
The atoms in disordered rock salts form a rock-salt structure, in which the cations are arranged in a face-centered cubic (FCC) lattice with the anions occupying the octahedral holes. The associated space group is Fm3̅m or 225, and the Strukturbericht designation is B1.

Disordered rock salts are distinct from other rock salts in that there are multiple different cations present in the crystal structure. Cations and anions (typically oxygen anions) are still present in equal numbers, but each cation site may be occupied one of several cations. These cations are present in a fixed ratio, but they are randomly distributed with no long-range order.

== Use in lithium-ion batteries ==
Disordered rock salts are most notable for their potential uses in lithium-ion battery cathodes. Current lithium-ion battery cathodes, such as nickel-manganese-cobalt (NMC) or nickel-cobalt-aluminum (NCA) based cathodes, rely heavily on cobalt and nickel metals, which are scarce and expensive. Cobalt is also toxic, and cobalt mining operations are often associated with human rights violations and environmental damage.

Disordered rock salts offer a potential solution to many of these concerns. For example, manganese and titanium based disordered rock salts show promise as lithium-ion battery cathodes. These metals are both more abundant and less expensive than cobalt and nickel, addressing some of the issues with current cathodes.
