= Shirley Meng =

Singaporean-American materials scientist

Ying Shirley Meng (孟穎）
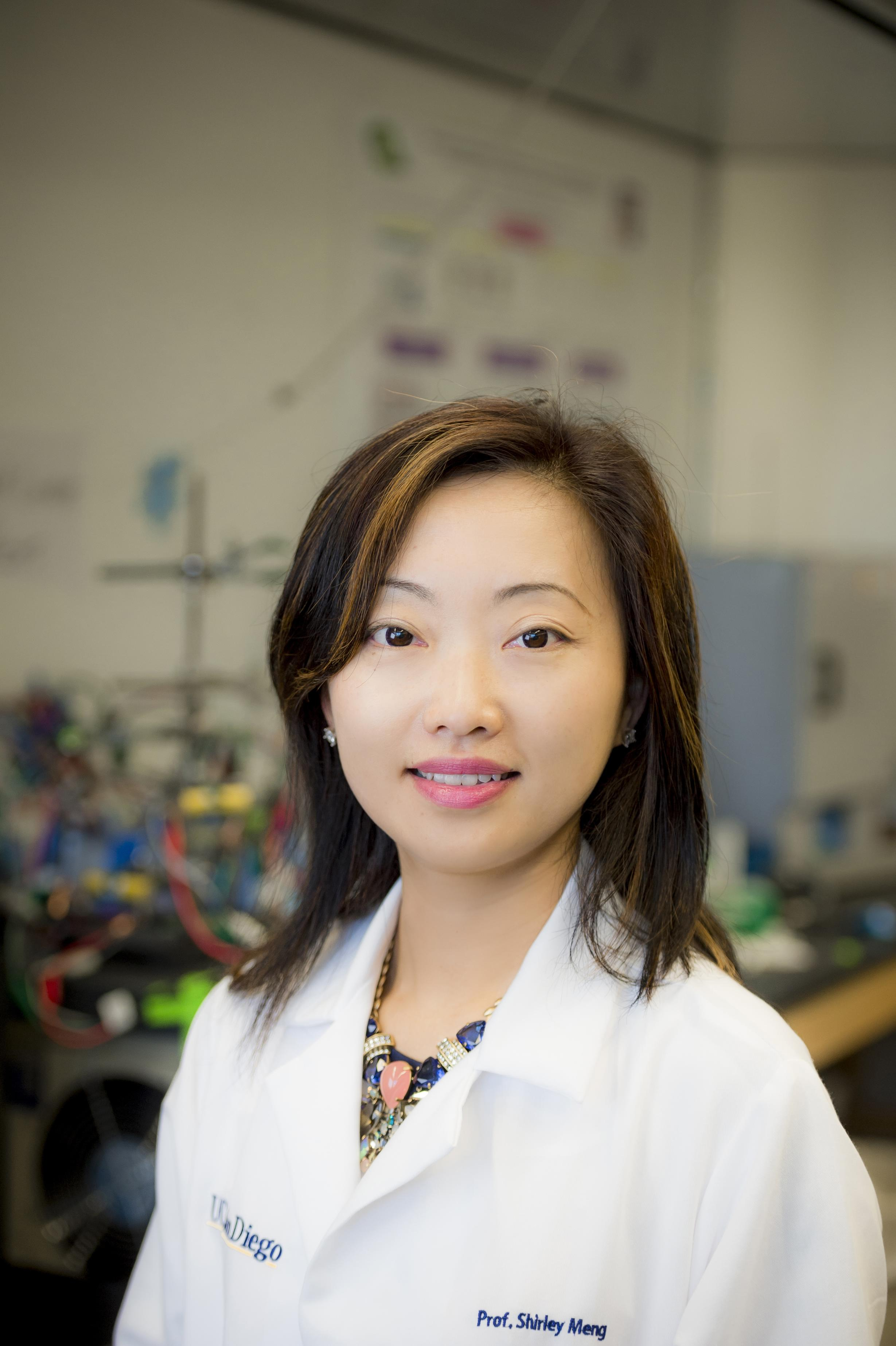
- Born: Hangzhou, China
- Education: Nanyang Technological University; Massachusetts Institute of Technology
- Known for: Energy storage and sustainability
- Awards: Fellow of the Materials Research Society (2021)
- Scientific career
- Fields: Energy storage Battery; Material Characterization; Electrochemistry; Nanomaterials
- Workplaces: University of Florida; University of California, San Diego; University of Chicago; Argonne National Laboratory
- Thesis: Combining Ab Initio Computation with Experiments for Designing/Understanding High Energy Density Electrode Materials for Advanced Lithium Batteries (2005)
- Doctoral advisor: Gerbrand Ceder
- Website: https://lescmeng.ai twitter

Ying Shirley Meng (Chinese: 孟穎; pinyin: Mèng Yǐng) is a Singaporean-American materials scientist and academic. She is a professor at the Pritzker School of Molecular Engineering at the University of Chicago and Argonne Collaborative Center for Energy Storage Science (ACCESS) chief scientist at Argonne National Laboratory. Meng is the author and co-author of more than 300 peer-reviewed journal articles, two book chapters and six patents. She serves on the executive committee for battery division at the Electrochemical Society and she is the Editor-in-Chief for MRS Energy & Sustainability.

== Education and career ==
Meng studied materials engineering at the Nanyang Technological University in Singapore and graduated in 2000 with a Bachelor of Science degree. She was a doctoral student in the Singapore-MIT Alliance for Research and Technology (SMART) program, Massachusetts Institute of Technology's largest international research initiative. She earned her doctoral degree in materials science under the supervision of Gerbrand Ceder in 2005, after which she joined Massachusetts Institute of Technology as a postdoctoral fellow.

In 2008, Meng joined the University of Florida as an assistant professor of Materials Science. She moved to the Aiiso Yufeng Li Family Department of Chemical and Nano Engineering at University of California, San Diego in 2009, where she also was a professor in the Materials Science Program. She was the founding director of the Sustainable Power and Energy Center from 2015 to 2020. In 2018, Meng was named the Zable Endowed Chair Professor in Energy Technologies. She was also the inaugural director of Institute for Materials Discovery and Design at University of California, San Diego from 2019.

In 2022, Meng joined the Pritzker School of Molecular Engineering at the University of Chicago as professor, as well as Argonne National Laboratory as chief scientist of the Argonne Collaborative Center for Energy Storage Science (ACCESS).

== Research ==
Meng's research focuses on investigating functional nano- and micro-scale materials for energy storage and conversion by combining advanced characterizations such as titration gas chromatography, cryo-EM, cryo-FIB, in situ CDXI, etc. and first-principles simulations. Her research includes lithium-ion batteries, sodium-ion batteries, all-solid-state batteries, magnetic materials and third-generation solar cells.

Recently, Meng established the analytical method of titration gas chromatography to quantify the contribution of unreacted metallic Li to the total amount of inactive lithium for diagnosing the failure mechanism in lithium metal batteries.

Her research work with her students has led to battery startups spinning out from her lab. One example is South 8 Technologies, a company that is commercializing liquefied gas electrolyte, developed as part of research by Cyrus Rustomji (UC San Diego PhD '15), that allows for lithium batteries to work at cold temperatures.

== Awards and honors ==
- 2002, Systems on Silicon Manufacturing Co. Pte. Ltd (SSMC) Award
- 2003, Graduate Student Award (Materials Research Society)
- 2008, Early Career Faculty Travel Award (The Electrochemical Society)
- 2011, National Science Foundation (NSF) CAREER Award
- 2013, Chancellor's Interdisciplinary Research Award
- 2014, Science Award Electrochemistry by BASF and Volkswagen
- 2015, Frontier of Innovation Award
- 2016, Charles W. Tobias Award, Electrochemical Society
- 2017, IUMRS-Singapore Young Scientist Research Award
- 2018, Elected Fellow of Electrochemical Society (ECS)
- 2018, Blavatnik Awards for Young Scientists Finalist
- 2018, American Chemical Society ACS Applied Materials & Interfaces Young Investigator Award 2018, International Coalition for Energy Storage and Innovation (ICESI) Inaugural Young Career Award
- 2019, Blavatnik Awards for Young Scientists Finalist
- 2019, Chancellor's Associates Faculty Excellence Award for Excellence in Research in Science and Engineering
- 2019, IBA2019 Research Award of International Battery Materials Association (IBA)
- 2021, Fellow of the Materials Research Society
- 2022, Department of Energy (DOE): Clean Energy Education & Empowerment Award
- 2022, Fellow of American Association for the Advancement of Science (AAAS)

== Professional memberships ==
Electrochemical Society; Materials Research Society; American Chemical Society.

== Selected publications ==
- Meng, Ying Shirley (2006-02-17). "Electrodes with High Power and High Capacity for Rechargeable Lithium Batteries". Science. 311 (5763): 977–980. Bibcode:2006Sci...311..977K. doi:10.1126/science.1122152. hdl:10203/25023. PMID 16484487. S2CID 23501791.
- Meng, Ying Shirley (2009). "First principles computational materials design for energy storage materials in lithium ion batteries". Energy & Environmental Science. 2 (6): 589–609. doi:10.1039/B901825E.
- Meng, Ying Shirley (2012-05-01). "Recent progress in cathode materials research for advanced lithium ion batteries". Materials Science and Engineering: R: Reports. 73 (5–6): 51–65. doi:10.1016/j.mser.2012.05.003.
- Rustomji, Cyrus S.; Yang, Yangyuchen; Kim, Tae Kyoung; Mac, Jimmy; Kim, Young Jin; Caldwell, Elizabeth; Chung, Hyeseung; Meng, Y. Shirley (30 June 2017). "Liquefied gas electrolytes for electrochemical energy storage devices". Science. 356 (6345): 4263. Bibcode:2017Sci...356L4263R. doi:10.1126/science.aal4263. PMID 28619715.
- Fang, Chengcheng; Wang, Xuefeng; Meng, Ying Shirley (2019). "Key Issues Hindering a Practical Lithium-Metal Anode". Trends in Chemistry. 1 (2): 152–158. doi:10.1016/j.trechm.2019.02.015. S2CID 189728712.
- Fang, Chengcheng; Li, Jinxing; Zhang, Minghao; Zhang, Yihui; Yang, Fan; Lee, Jungwoo Z.; Lee, Min-Han; Alvarado, Judith; Schroeder, Marshall A.; Yang, Yangyuchen; Lu, Bingyu; Williams, Nicholas; Ceja, Miguel; Yang, Li; Cai, Mei; Gu, Jing; Xu, Kang; Wang, Xuefeng; Meng, Ying Shirley (21 August 2019). "Quantifying inactive lithium in lithium metal batteries". Nature. 572 (7770): 511–515. arXiv:1811.01029. Bibcode:2019Natur.572..511F. doi:10.1038/s41586-019-1481-z. PMID 31435056. S2CID 106324714.
