= Molecular Foundry =

US research facility

Coordinates: 37.8749°N 122.2425°W

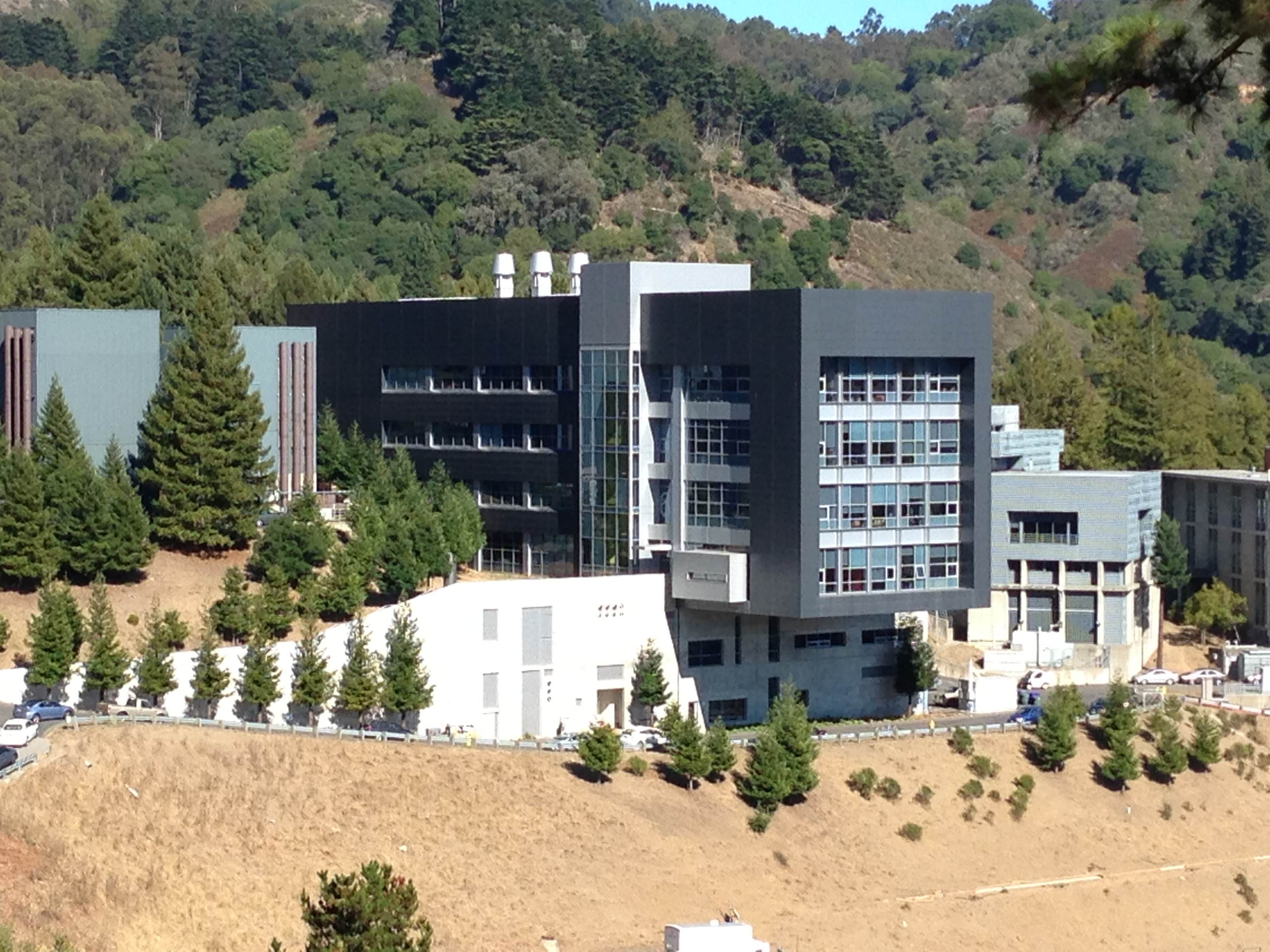
The Molecular Foundry building in Berkeley, California

The Molecular Foundry is a nanoscience user facility located at the Lawrence Berkeley National Laboratory in Berkeley, California, and is one of five national Nanoscale Science Research Centers sponsored by the United States Department of Energy.

== Overview ==
The Molecular Foundry was founded in 2003. The building was completed on March 24, 2006. The current director, Ashfia Huq, was appointed in 2025, following permanent directors Kristin Persson (2020-2024), Jeff Neaton (2013–2019), Omar Yaghi (2012–2013) and Carolyn Bertozzi (2006–2010).

Users of the Molecular Foundry are provided with free access to instruments, techniques and collaborators for nanoscience research that is in the public domain and intended for open publication. Foundry users can collaborate with LBNL's broader scientific community, including user facilities like the Advanced Light Source (ALS), National Energy Research Scientific Computing Center (NERSC), and the Joint Genome Institute (JGI), plus the Energy Innovation Hubs, such as the Joint Center for Energy Storage Research (JCESR), the Liquid Sunlight Alliance (LiSA), the Joint BioEnergy Institute (JBEI), and a number of local Energy Frontier Research Centers (EFRCs). Proposals for user projects are aimed to promote interdisciplinary collaboration in the areas of materials science, physics, electrical engineering, environmental engineering, biology and chemistry.

“Nanoscience” includes all fields of science studied at the nanoscale so the Foundry features scientists with expertise across a broad range of disciplines and state-of-the-art, often one-of-a-kind, instrumentation. The Foundry’s capabilities are organized into seven technical facilities that cover the research areas of synthesis, theory, characterization, and fabrication.

== Facilities ==
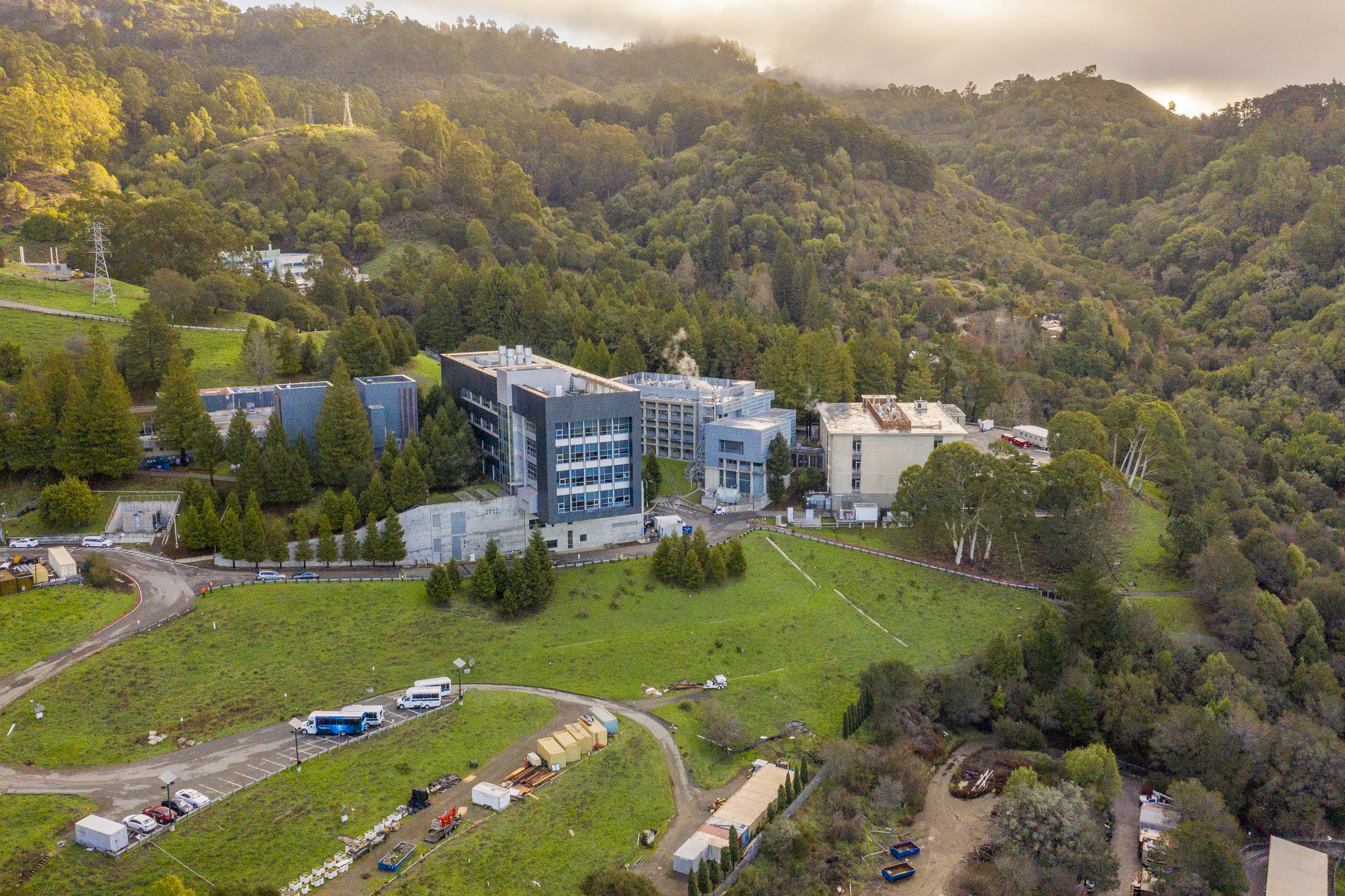
The Molecular Foundry and surrounding buildings

The Foundry's six floors and NCEM operate as technically distinct facilities, each equipped with state-of-the-art instrumentation, laboratories, and computational resources. These seven facilities include:

- Imaging and Manipulation of Nanostructures, led by Facility Director Paul Ashby and founded by Miquel Salmeron.
  - Characterization and manipulation of nanostructures—from "hard" to very "soft" matter—combining electron microscopy, optical microscopy and scanning probe microscopy.
- Nanofabrication, led by Facility Director Adam Schwartzberg and founded by Jeff Bokor.
  - Advanced lithography and thin-film processing emphasizing integration with chemical and biological nanosystems and the development of nanoscale electronic, magnetic and photonic devices.
- Theory of Nanostructured Materials, led by Facility Director David Prendergast and founded by Steven Louie.
  - Theoretical support to guide understanding of new principles, behavior and experiments—including electrical transport in nanoscale molecular junctions, self-assembly of biological nanostructures and computation of spectroscopy at hybrid nanoscale interfaces.
- Inorganic Nanostructures, led by Facility Director Jeff Urban and founded by A. Paul Alivisatos.
  - The science of semiconductor, carbon and hybrid nanostructures—including design and synthesis of nanocrystals, nanowires and nanotubes—and study of their electronic applications.
- Biological Nanostructures, led by Facility Director Corie Ralston and founded by Carolyn R. Bertozzi.
  - New materials based on the self-assembly of biopolymers and bio-inspired polymers, new probes for bio-imaging and synthetic biology techniques to re-engineer organisms and create hybrid biomolecules to interface with devices.
- Organic and Macromolecular Synthesis, led by Facility Director Yi Liu and founded by Jean Fréchet.
  - Studies of "soft" materials — including synthesis of organic molecules, macromolecules, polymers and their assemblies, with access to functional systems, photoactive, organic-inorganic hybrid and porous materials.
- National Center for Electron Microscopy, led by Facility Director Andy Minor. NCEM was founded in 1983 as an independent DOE user facility and merged with the Molecular Foundry in 2014.
  - Use and development of an array of electron microscopes, offering capabilities for materials characterization at high resolution.

== User program ==
The Molecular Foundry has a user program that facilitates access to the center's staff and equipment. The program currently serves over 1000 scientists from academia, industry, and research institutes.

Foundry access is free for researchers who intend to publish the results of their work with acknowledgement of the facility’s use. Researchers can also perform proprietary research, not intended for publication, by paying a full cost-recovery rate for lab and instrument access.

To become a Foundry user, researchers must submit a proposal. An external panel of subject-matter experts review proposals for scientific merit. If a proposal is accepted, a user gets one year of access to the Foundry.

The Foundry has 45 scientific and technical staff who collaborate with users on their research projects, providing instrument training, experiment planning, and guidance through challenges, as users come to work on their projects.
