= Lithium nickel cobalt aluminium oxides =

Group of chemical compounds

The lithium nickel cobalt aluminium oxides (abbreviated as Li-NCA, LNCA, or NCA) are a group of mixed metal oxides. Some of them are important due to their application in lithium-ion batteries. NCAs are used as active material in the positive electrode (which is the cathode when the battery is discharged). NCAs are composed of the cations of the chemical element lithium, and oxyanions containing the elements nickel, cobalt and aluminium. The compounds of this class have a general formula LiNi_{x}Co_{y}Al_{z}O_{2} with x + y + z = 1. In case of the NCA comprising batteries currently available on the market, which are also used in electric cars and electric appliances, x ≈ 0.84, and the voltage of those batteries is between 3.6 V and 4.0 V, at a nominal voltage of 3.6 V or 3.7 V. A version of the oxides currently in use in 2019 is LiNi_{0.84}Co_{0.12}Al_{0.04}O_{2}.

== Properties of NCA ==
The usable charge storage capacity of NCA is about 180 to 200 mAh/g. This is well below the theoretical values; for LiNi_{0.8}Co_{0.15}Al_{0.05}O_{2} this is 279 mAh/g. However, the capacity of NCA is significantly higher than that of alternative materials such as lithium cobalt oxide LiCoO_{2} with 148 mAh/g, lithium iron phosphate LiFePO_{4} with 165 mAh/g and NMC 333 LiNi_{0.33}Mn_{0.33}Co_{0.33}O_{2} with 170 mAh/g. Like LiCoO_{2} and NMC, NCA belongs to the cathode materials with layer structure. Due to the high voltage, NCA enables batteries with high energy density. Another advantage of NCA is its excellent fast charging capability. Disadvantages are the high costs and the limited resources of cobalt and nickel.

The two materials NCA and NMC have related structures, quite similar electrochemical behaviour and show similar performance, in particular relatively high energy densities and relatively high performance. Noteworthy, Ni is cycled during the battery operation between oxidation states +2 and +3.5, Co- between +2 and +3, and Mn and Al remain electrochemically inactive.

It is estimated that the NCA battery pack in a Tesla Model 3 contains between 4.5 and 9.5 kg of cobalt and 11.6 kg of lithium.

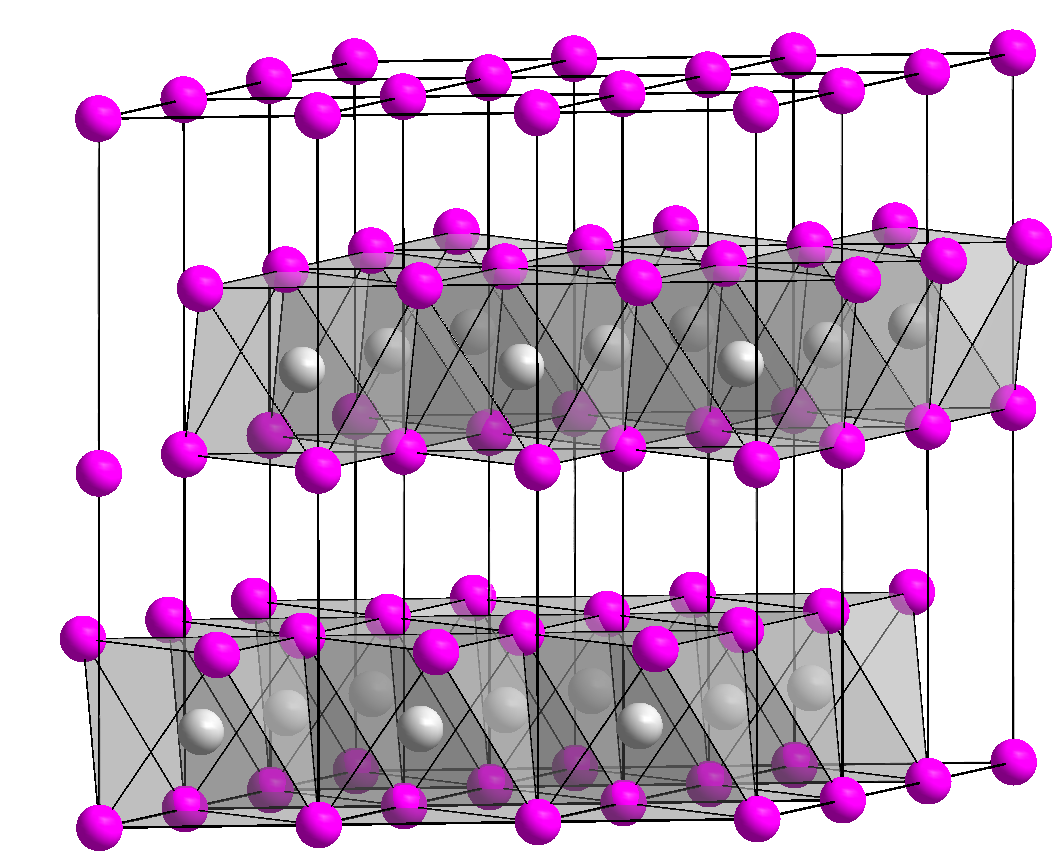

Lithium nickel oxide LiNiO_{2}, which is closely related to NCA, or nickel(IV) oxide NiO_{2} itself, cannot yet be used as a battery material because it is mechanically unstable, shows a rapid loss of capacity and has safety issues.

== Nickel-rich NCA: advantages and limitations ==
NCAs LiNi_{x}Co_{y}Al_{z}O_{2} with x ≥ 0.8 are called nickel rich; those compounds are the most important variants of the substance class. The nickel-rich variants are also low in cobalt and therefore have a cost advantage, as cobalt is several times more expensive than nickel. Furthermore, as the nickel content increases, so does the voltage and the mAh/g charge that can be stored in the battery. This is because Co is cycled in a battery between oxidation states +3 and +3.5 (i.e. with 0.5 electron/cobalt atom), while nickel can go between +3 and +4 (i.e. 1 electron/nickel atom). Thus, increasing the molar fraction of nickel in the posode increases both the mAh/g number and the cell voltage. However, as the nickel content increases, the risk of thermal breakdown and premature aging of the battery also increases. When a typical NCA battery is heated to 180 °C, it will thermally run away. If the battery was previously overcharged, thermal run away can occur even at 65 °C. The aluminium ions in NCA increase stability and safety, but they reduce capacity because they do not participate in oxidation and reduction themselves.

== Modifications of the material ==
To make NCA more resistant, in particular for batteries that need to operate at temperatures above 50 °C, the NCA active material is usually coated. The coatings demonstrated in research may comprise fluorides such as aluminium fluoride AlF_{3}, crystalline oxides (e.g. CoO_{2}, TiO_{2}, NMC) or glassy oxides (silicon dioxide SiO_{2}) or phosphates such as FePO_{4}.

== NCA batteries: Manufacturers and use ==
The main producers of NCA and their market shares in 2015 were Sumitomo Metal Mining with 58%, Toda Kogyo (BASF) with 16%, Nihon Kagaku Sangyo with 13% and Ecopro with 5%. Sumitomo supplies Tesla and Panasonic and was able to produce 850 tons of NCA per month in 2014. In 2016, Sumitomo increased its monthly production capacity to 2550 tons, and in 2018 to 4550 tons. In China, in Tongren County in Qinghai Province, a plant has been under construction since 2019, which will initially produce 1500 tons of NCA per month.

As of 2018, the most important manufacturer of NCA batteries was reportedly Panasonic, or Panasonic's cooperation partner Tesla, as Tesla uses NCA as active material in the traction batteries of its car models. In Tesla Model 3 and Tesla Model X, LiNi_{0.84}Co_{0.12}Al_{0.04}O_{2} is used. With a few exceptions, current electric cars as of 2019 use either NCA or alternatively lithium nickel manganese cobalt oxides (NMC). In addition to use in electric cars, NCA is also used in batteries for electronic devices, mainly by Panasonic, Sony and Samsung. Some cordless vacuum cleaners are also equipped with NCA batteries.
