= Materials Project =

Open-access material properties database

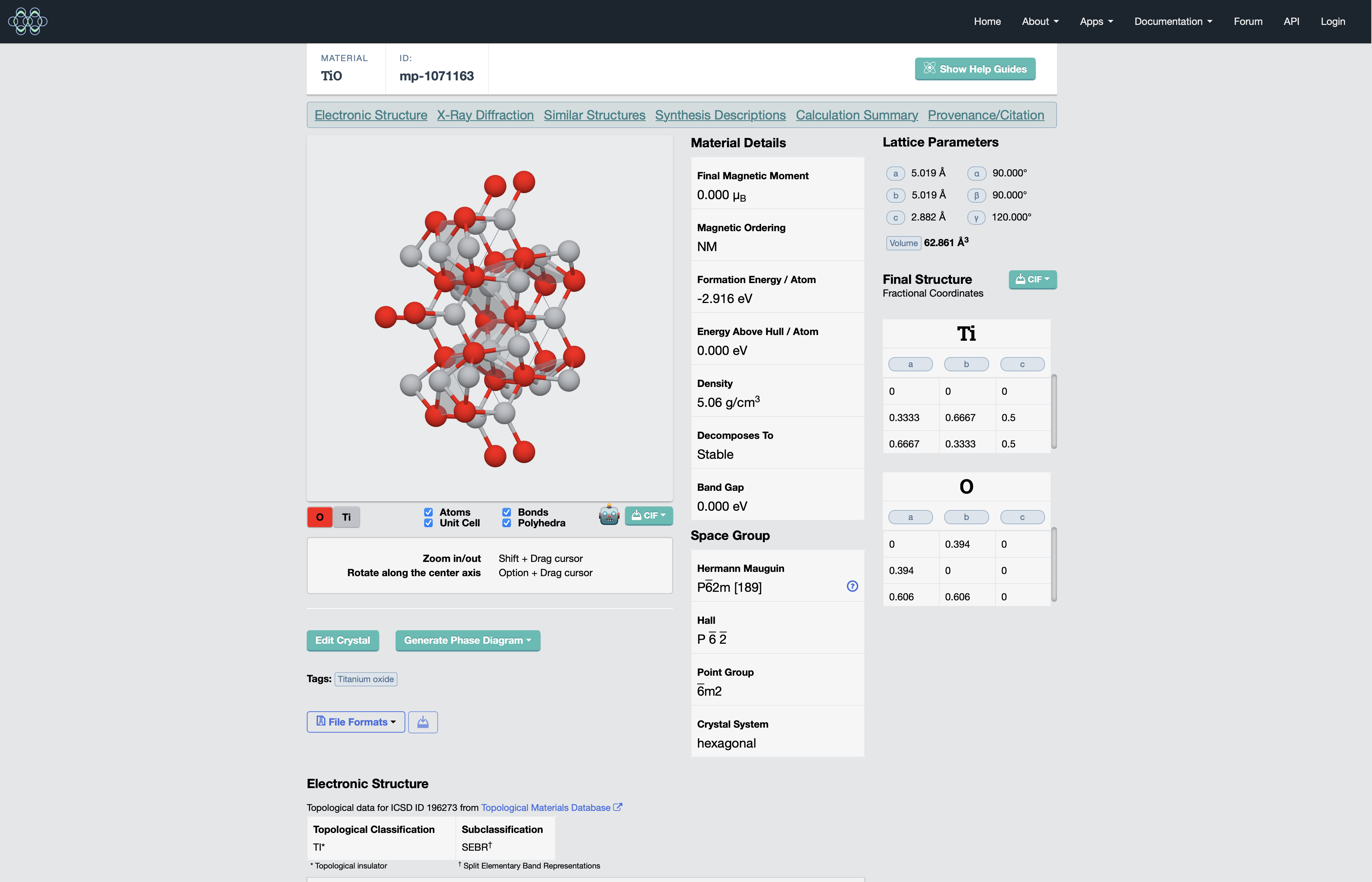
- Screenshot of the database entry for mp-1071163, a polymorph of titanium(II) oxide
- Website type: Scientific database
- Founder: Kristin Persson
- Website: materialsproject.org
- Commercial: No
- Registration: Optional
- Users: 600,000 (2025)
- Launched: 2011

The Materials Project is an open-access database offering material properties to accelerate the development of technology by predicting how new materials–both real and hypothetical–can be used. The project was established in 2011 with an emphasis on battery research, but includes property calculations for many areas of clean energy systems such as photovoltaics, thermoelectric materials, and catalysts. Most of the known 35,000 molecules and over 130,000 inorganic compounds are included in the database.

Dr. Kristin Persson of Lawrence Berkeley National Laboratory founded and leads the initiative, which uses supercomputers at Berkeley, among other institutions, to run calculations using Density Functional Theory (DFT). Commonly computed values include enthalpy of formation, crystal structure, and band gap. The assembled databases of computed structures and properties is freely available to anyone under a CC 4.0 license and was developed with ease of use in mind. The data have been used to predict new materials that should be synthesizable, and screen existing materials for useful properties.

The project can be traced back to Persson's postdoc research at MIT in 2004, during which she was given access to a supercomputer to do DFT calculations. After joining Berkeley Lab in 2008, Persson received the necessary funding to make the data from her research freely available.

== See also ==
- List of materials science software
