= Voyah Dream =

Large MPV

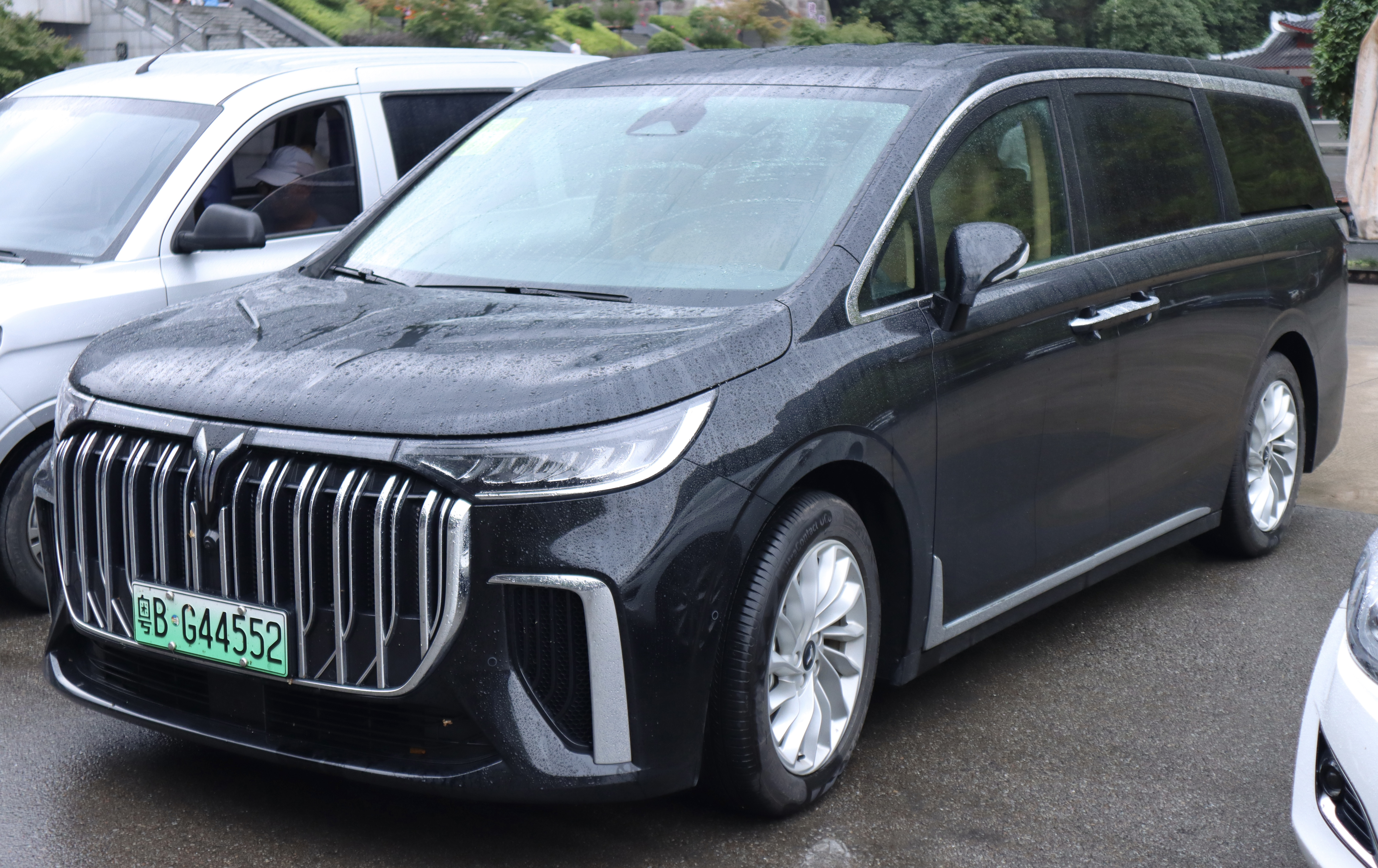

Overview
- Manufacturer: Voyah
- Also called: Voyah Dreamer; Voyah Dream/Dreamer 9; Rabdan Seven (UAE)
- Production: 2021–present
- Assembly: China: Wuhan; Russia: Lipetsk; UAE: Abu Dhabi

Body and chassis
- Class: Large MPV (M)
- Body style: 5-door minivan
- Layout: Rear-motor, rear-wheel drive (EV); Dual-motors, four-wheel-drive (EV); Front engine, four-wheel drive (PHEV)
- Platform: Electric Smart Secure Architecture (ESSA)
- Related: Voyah Courage; Voyah Free; Voyah Passion

Powertrain
- Engine: Petrol PHEV: 1.5 L Dongfeng C15TDR series I4 turbo (PHEV)
- Electric motor: 2×1XM AC permanent magnet synchronous
- Power output: 160 kW (210 hp; 220 PS) (EV) (2021–2024); 320 kW (429 hp; 435 PS) (EV) (2021–2024); 475 kW (646 hp; 655 PS) (EV) (2024–present); 130 kW (174 hp; 177 PS) (PHEV) (2021–2024); 294 kW (394 hp; 399 PS) (EREV) (2021–2024); 420 kW (571 hp; 579 PS) (PHEV) (2021–2024); 555 kW (744 hp; 754 PS) (PHEV) (2024–present)
- Transmission: 1-speed direct-drive (EV)
- Hybrid drivetrain: PHEV (split plug-in); EREV (series plug-in)
- Battery: 82-108.7 kWh NMC (EV); 43 kWh LFP (PHEV); 25.57 kWh CATL NMC or LFP (EREV)
- Electric range: 520 km (323 mi)

Dimensions
- Wheelbase: 3,200 mm (126.0 in)
- Length: 5,315 mm (209.3 in); 5,325 mm (209.6 in) (Dream/Dreamer 9)
- Width: 1,980 mm (78.0 in); 1,980 mm (78.0 in) (Dream/Dreamer 9)
- Height: 1,810 mm (71.3 in); 1,805 mm (71.1 in) (Dream/Dreamer 9)
- Curb weight: 2,625 kg (5,787 lb)

The Voyah Dream (Chinese: 岚图梦想家; pinyin: Lántú Mèngxiǎngjiā) is a battery electric and plug-in hybrid large MPV produced by Dongfeng under the Voyah brand, which launched on the Chinese car market in March 2022.

== Overview ==
The Dream was first presented at the 2021 Guangzhou Auto Show, showing a prototype of a large and luxurious minivan with 2+2+3 seating setup. The Dream rides on the Electric Smart Secure Architecture (ESSA) of Dongfeng which is shared with the Voyah Free.

For the interior, the Dream is equipped with individual seats featuring heating, cooling, and massaging functions. The dashboard has a three-screen layout and a floating center console with hidden large storage compartments underneath.

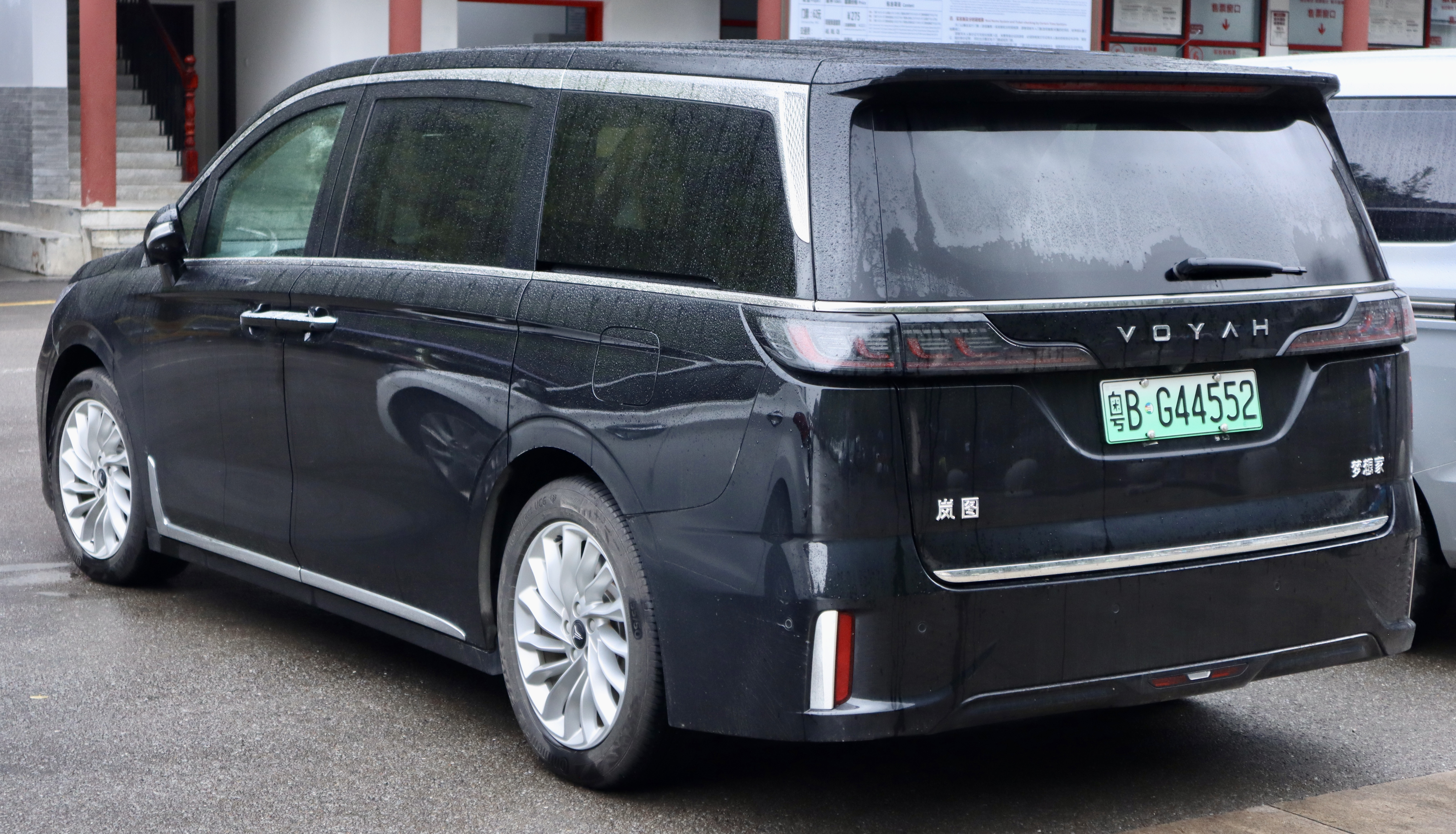
Rear view

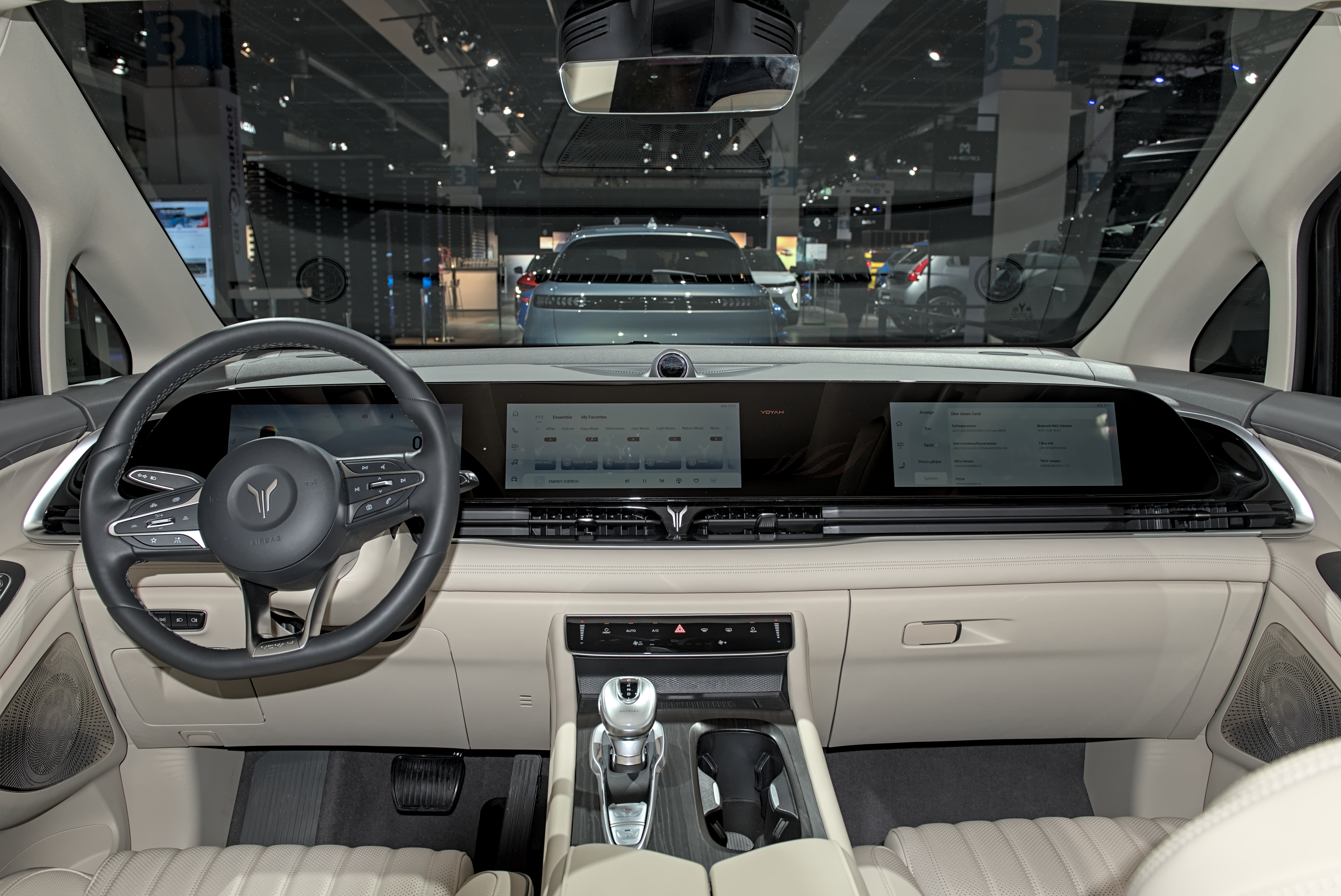
Interior

=== 2024 (facelift) ===
On 15 August 2024, the Voyah Dream facelift made its world premiere. The car is equipped with Huawei Qiankun Intelligent Driving Systems and HarmonyOS Cockpit.

Voyah Dream 2024 (facelift)

Rear view

== Voyah Dream/Dreamer 9 ==
Alongside the standard Dreamer lineup—which underwent successive upgrades and visual revisions over the years a luxury variant named the Dream/Dreamer 9 debuted in September 2026, sold alongside the original model. It was distinguished by a unique front-end design featuring dual-tier headlights that echoed the styling of the Passion L and Taishan models, as well as redesigned taillights and a revised cockpit layout. The more minimalist interior featured a horizontal infotainment screen extending across to the passenger side, along with more luxurious seating offering extensive adjustability.

Voyah Dream 9

Rear view

== Specifications ==
The Voyah Dream is launched with the introduction of the range extended plug-in hybrid version powered by a dual of 130 kW (174 hp; 177 PS) and 160 kW (215 hp; 218 PS) electric motors plus a 1.5-litre turbo engine, capable of accelerating from 0–100 km/h (62 mph) in 5.9 seconds.

== Sales ==
Year	China			Thailand
Year	EV	PHEV	Total	Thailand
2022			6,933	
2023	3,799	16,884	20,683	
2024	4,393	42,725	47,118	
2025	8,124	60,812	68,936	
2026				
2027				
