= Voyah Courage =

Mid-size luxury crossover SUV

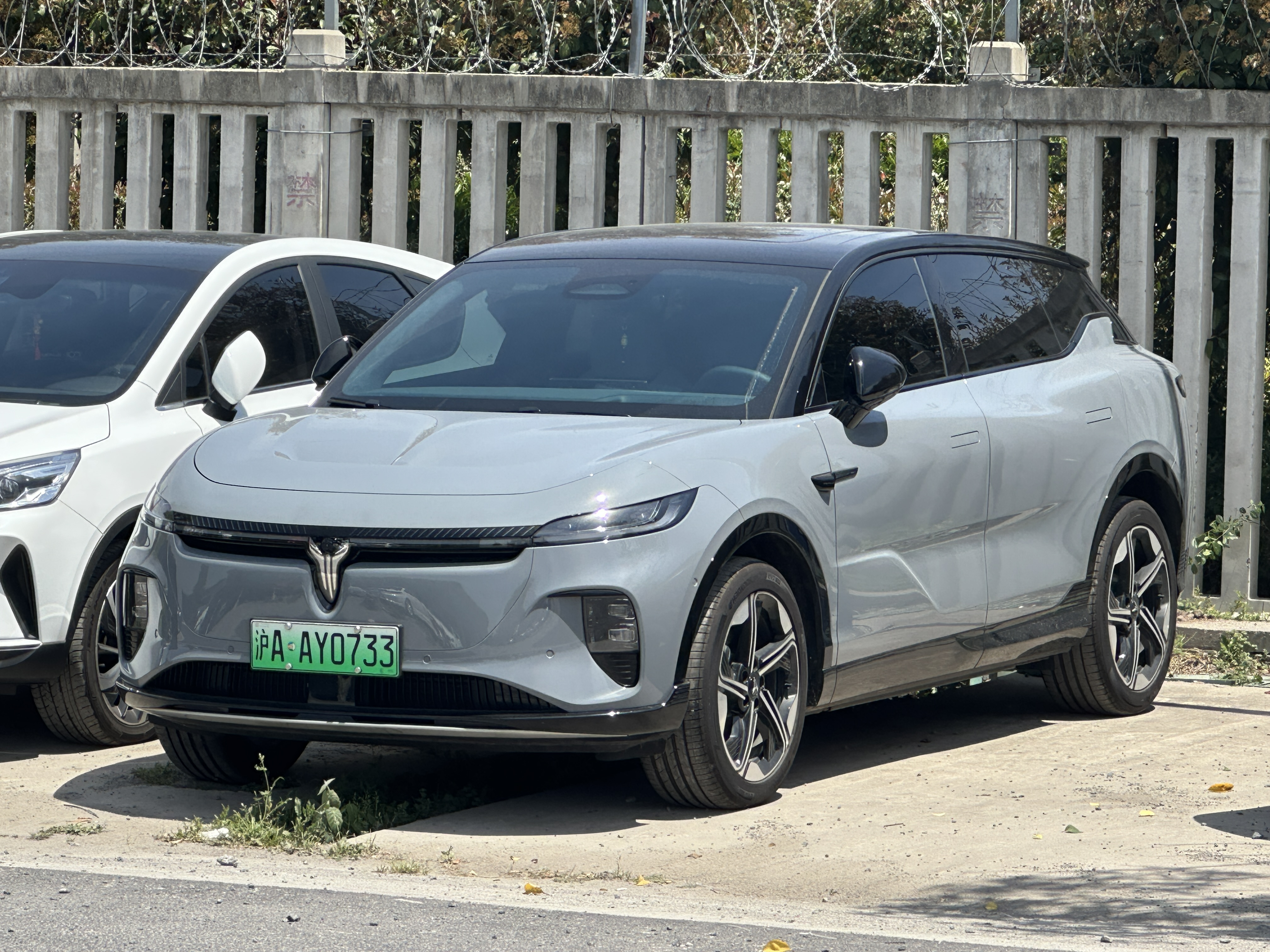

Overview
- Manufacturer: Voyah
- Also called: Voyah Zhiyin
- Production: 2024–present
- Assembly: China: Wuhan

Body and chassis
- Class: Mid-size luxury crossover SUV (D)
- Body style: 5-door SUV
- Layout: Rear-motor, rear-wheel drive
- Platform: Electric Smart Secure Architecture (ESSA)
- Related: Voyah Dream; Voyah Free; Voyah Passion

Powertrain
- Electric motor: 2×1XM AC permanent magnet synchronous
- Transmission: 1-speed direct-drive
- Battery: 77 kWh LFP CATL; 79 kWh NMC CATL; 81 kWh LFP CATL/Sunwoda; 109 kWh NMC CATL; 112 kWh NMC CATL
- Electric range: 570–901 km (354–560 mi) (CLTC)

Dimensions
- Wheelbase: 2,900 mm (114 in)
- Length: 4,725 mm (186 in); 4,810 mm (189 in) (2025 refresh)
- Width: 1,900 mm (75 in)
- Height: 1,636 mm (64.4 in)
- Kerb weight: 2,099–2,227 kg (4,628–4,910 lb)

The Voyah Courage (Chinese: 岚图知音; pinyin: Lántú Zhīyīn) is a battery electric mid-size luxury crossover SUV produced by Dongfeng under the Voyah brand.

== Overview ==
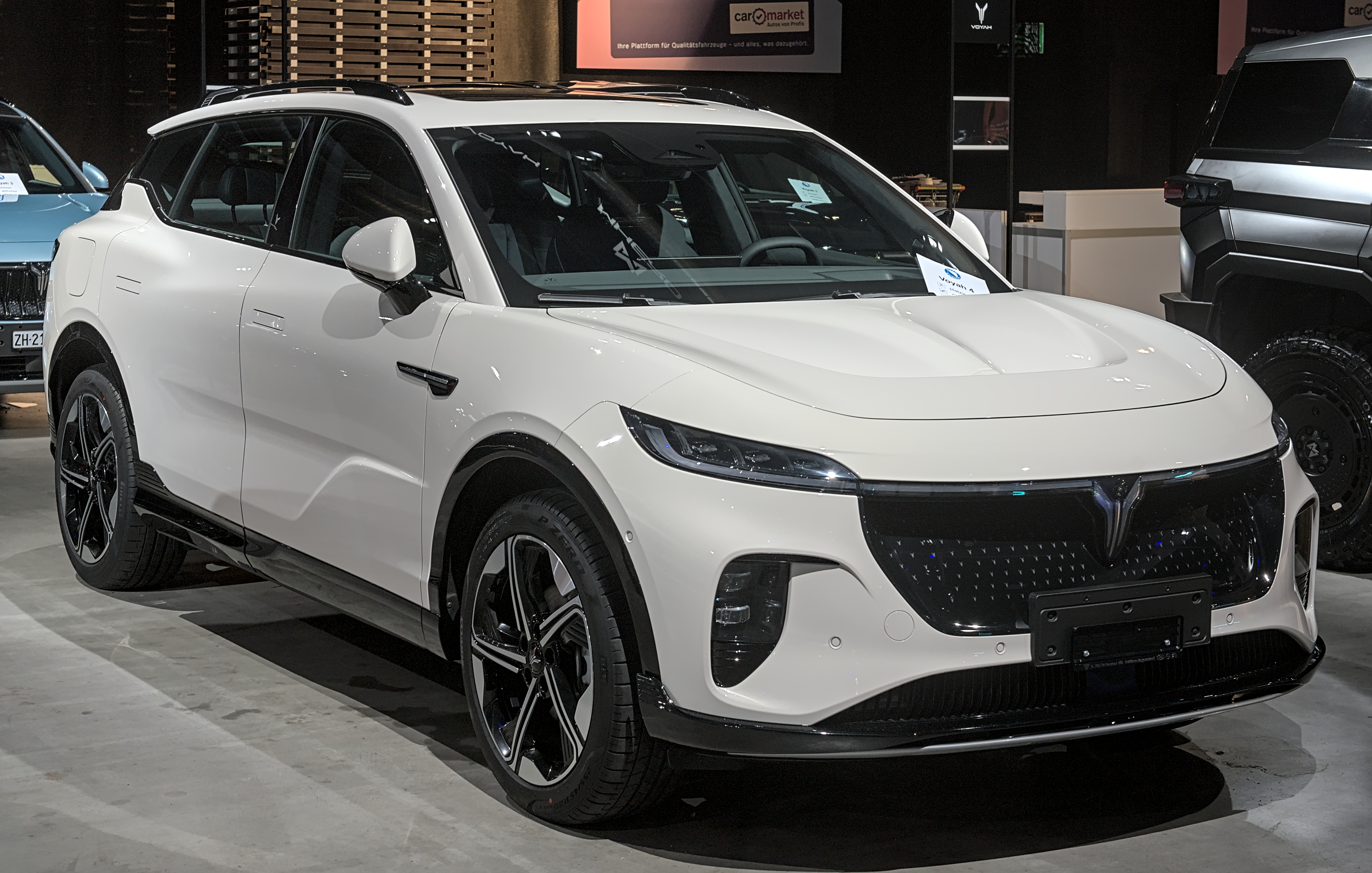
Voyah Courage Long Range

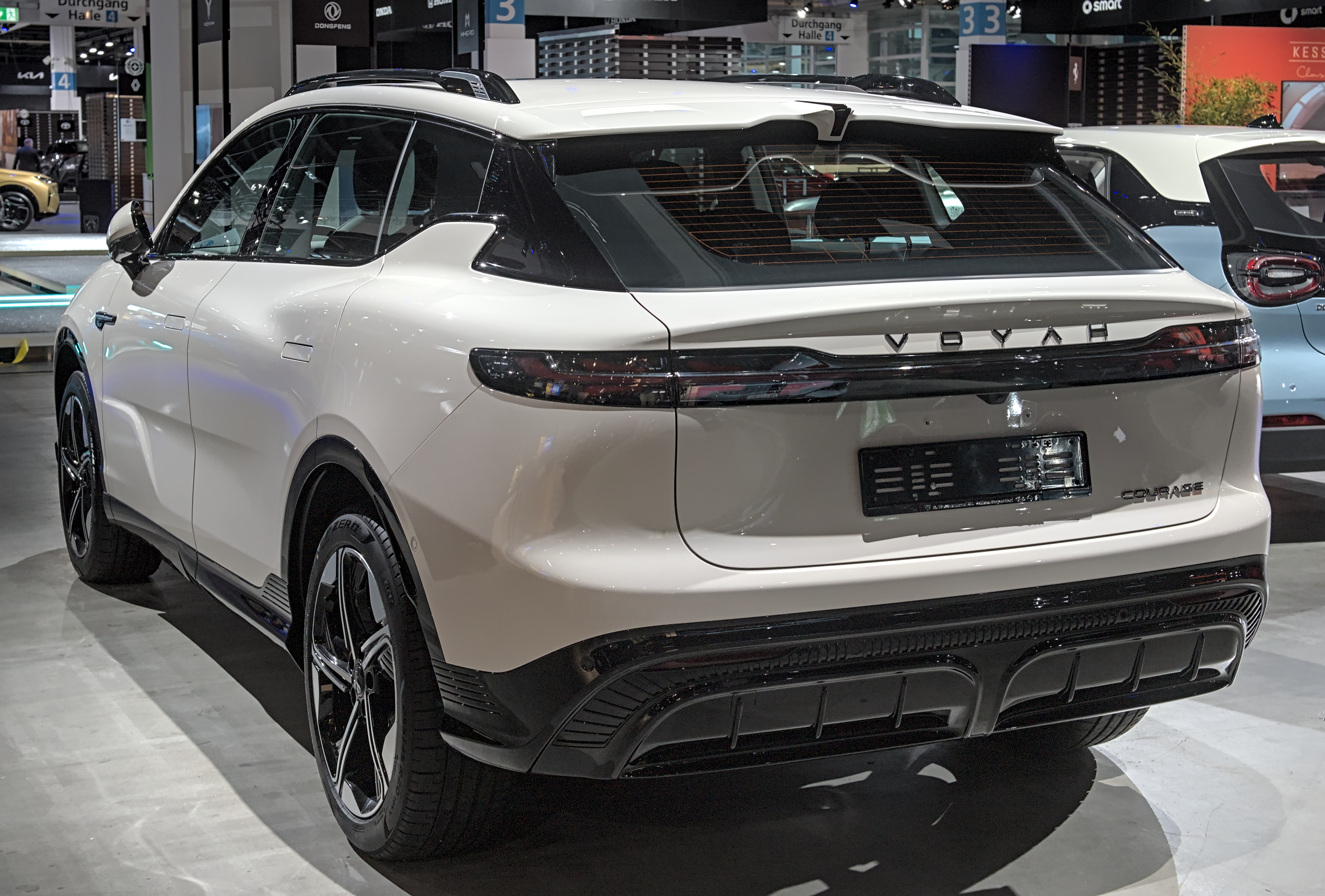
Rear view

Interior

After a two-year break, in mid-2024 The Voyah returned to expanding its model range. The fourth product in the portfolio is the mid-size SUV Courage, which is based on the new generation of the modular ESSA platform from Dongfeng Motor. The car has a stylistic language identical to the previous Voyah, distinguished by narrow headlights connected by a luminous strip including the illuminated manufacturer's logo. The unusually shaped C-pillar optically separates the roof and glass surface from the lower part of the body.

Other distinctive accents of Courage include: extensive door embossing, gently sloping roofline, retractable door handles, rear light strip running across the entire width of the vehicle, and optional 20-inch alloy wheels. The passenger cabin is dominated by a high central tunnel, under which there is an additional storage compartment. Above it is the central touch screen of the multimedia system, which allows you to control most of the vehicle's functions.

The HarmonyOS software was developed in collaboration with Chinese technology company Huawei.

=== 2025 refresh ===
The 2025 refresh for the Courage was launched on 28 August 2025.

The exterior features a redesigned front grille which lacks pass-through vents to the hood, and instead features a customizable light array.

The interior features a 10.25-inch LCD digital instrument cluster display supplemented by an optional AR-HUD, and a central infotainment touchscreen that is either a 15.6-inch 2K-resolution display running HarmonyOS or 15.4-inch 2K-resolution display running Voyah's self-developed Kunpeng cockpit system powered by a Qualcomm Snapdragon 8295P chip.

It is equipped with Huawei's Qiankun ADS 4 ADAS system, which has a sensor suite consisting of one 192-line roof-mounted LiDAR, 3 mmWave radars, 11 cameras, and 12 ultrasonic sensors, and is capable of Level 2 supervised autonomous driving in highway and urban conditions. Later, a self-developed Kunpeng ADAS system became available, which uses 5 mmWave radars, 10 cameras, and 12 ultrasonic sensors and is capable of Level 2 supervised autonomous driving in highway conditions.

It is available with a new, more efficient all-wheel drive system and the slower charging 77 kWh battery pack option has been dropped.

=== 2027 update ===
The updated Courage was launched on 13 November 2026 for the 2027 model year. The exterior features new Dusk Mountain Purple and Starlight Silver paint colors and a new Aurora Purple interior color scheme, and the rear seats are power folding. It features an updated ADAS system has been updated to the Qiankun ADS 5 Ultra system, which features Huawei's latest 896-line roof-mounted LiDAR sensor.

It is available in both rear and all-wheel drive with only the 81 kWh LFP battery pack capable of recharging 20–80% in 10 minutes.

== Specifications ==
The Courage was designed exclusively for electric drive, in three drive specifications. The basic, rear-wheel drive version has an electric motor with a power of 288 hp (215 kW; 292 PS) or 308 hp (230 kW; 312 PS), while the battery with a capacity of 77 kWh will allow a range of up to 625 kilometres (388 mi) on a single charge according to the CLTC standard. The same motors can also be combined with a larger 109 kWh battery, this time giving a CLTC range of 901 kilometres (560 mi). The top AWD variant offers 543 hp (405 kW; 551 PS) and a 77 kWh battery, which translates into 570 kilometres (354 mi) of CLTC range.

Models equipped with the 77 kWh pack have WLTP range ratings of 476 and 440 kilometres (296 and 273 mi) for rear- and all-wheel drive, respectively.

Specifications
Model year	Battery		Motor		Power	Torque	Range	DC charging		0–100 km/h (62 mph)	Kerb weight
Model year	Type	Weight	Front	Rear	Power	Torque	CLTC	Peak	20–80%	0–100 km/h (62 mph)	Kerb weight
2024	77 kWh LFP CATL/Sunwoda	541 kg (1,193 lb)	—	215 kW TZ220XSP02 PMSM	288 hp (215 kW; 292 PS)	420 N⋅m (310 lb⋅ft)	625 km (388 mi)	100 kW	26 min	6.8 s	2,099 kg (4,628 lb)
2024	77 kWh LFP CATL/Sunwoda	541 kg (1,193 lb)	160 kW TZ200XSP08 PMSM	160 kW TZ200XSP08 PMSM	429 hp (320 kW; 435 PS)	620 N⋅m (457 lb⋅ft)	570 km (354 mi)	100 kW	26 min	4.9 s	2,227 kg (4,910 lb)
2024	79 kWh LFP CATL	585 kg (1,290 lb)	—	230 kW TZ225XYH01 PMSM	308 hp (230 kW; 312 PS)	395 N⋅m (291 lb⋅ft)	650 km (404 mi)		10 min	6.8 s	2,145 kg (4,729 lb)
2025	81 kWh LFP CATL	585 kg (1,290 lb)	—	230 kW TZ225XYH01 PMSM	308 hp (230 kW; 312 PS)	395 N⋅m (291 lb⋅ft)	650 km (404 mi)	440 kW	10 min	6.8 s	2,175 kg (4,795 lb)
2025	81 kWh LFP CATL/Sunwoda	575.5 kg (1,269 lb)	175 kW YS225XYH02 induction	230 kW TZ225XYH01 PMSM	543 hp (405 kW; 551 PS)	770 N⋅m (568 lb⋅ft)	600 km (373 mi)	440 kW	10 min	4.9 s	2,285 kg (5,038 lb)
2024	109 kWh NMC CATL	549 kg (1,210 lb)	—	230 kW TZ225XYH01 PMSM	308 hp (230 kW; 312 PS)	395 N⋅m (291 lb⋅ft)	901 km (560 mi)		32 min	6.8 s	2,099 kg (4,628 lb)
2025	112 kWh NMC CATL	549 kg (1,210 lb)	—	230 kW TZ225XYH01 PMSM	308 hp (230 kW; 312 PS)	395 N⋅m (291 lb⋅ft)	901 km (560 mi)	185 kW	32 min	6.8 s	2,099 kg (4,628 lb)

== Safety ==
Euro NCAP test results Voyah Courage Flagship (LHD) (2025)
Test	Points	%
Overall:	5 /5 stars	
Adult occupant:	36.3	90%
Child occupant:	43.5	88%
Pedestrian:	48.1	76%
Safety assist:	15.7	87%

== Sales ==
The updated 2025 Courage received 3,000 firm orders within 12 minutes of its launch on 28 August 2026.

Year	China
2024	3,514
2025	15,909
