= Voyah Passion S =

Mid-size luxury crossover SUV

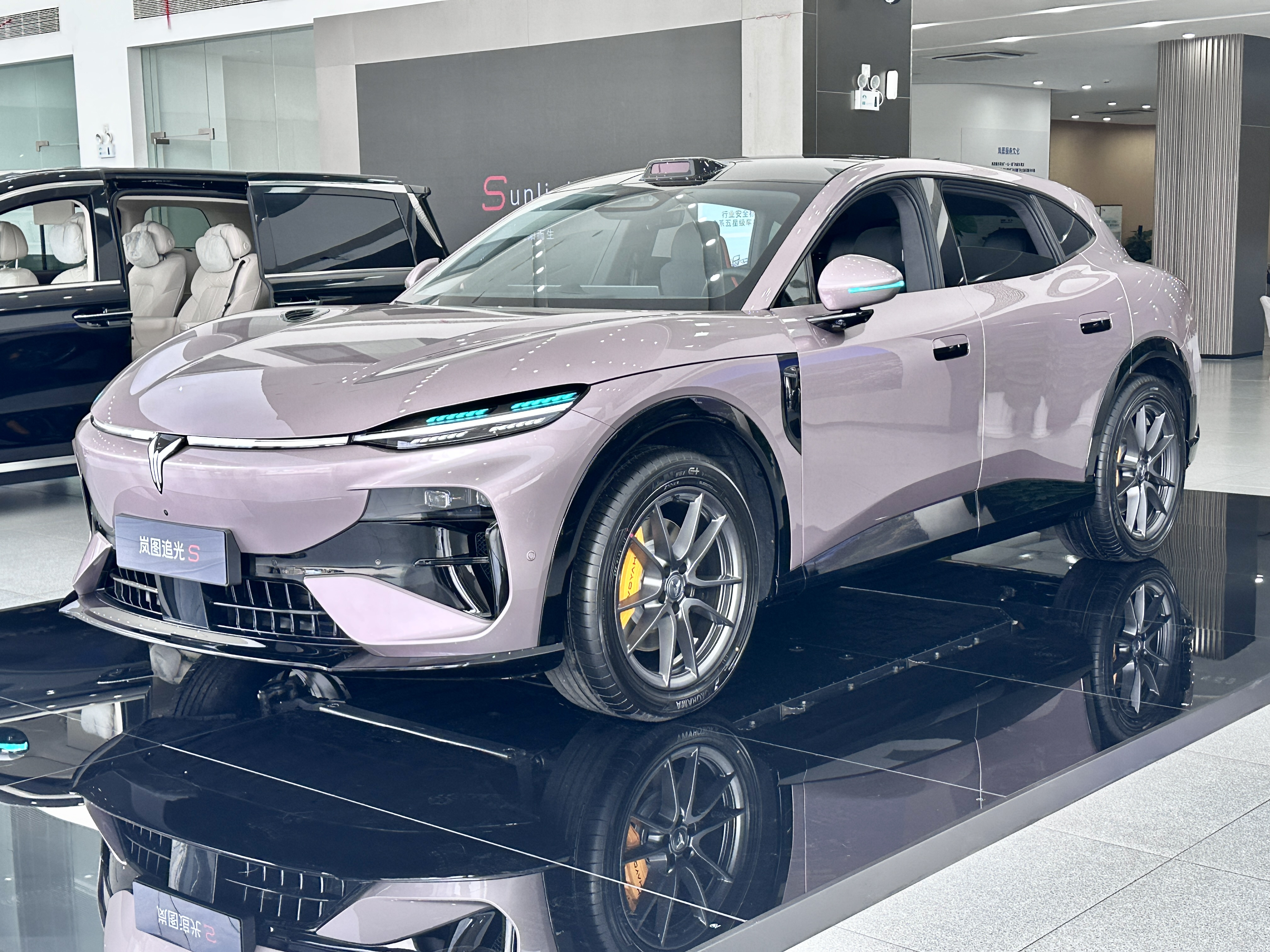

Overview
- Manufacturer: Voyah
- Also called: Voyah Zhuiguang S
- Production: 2026–present
- Assembly: China: Wuhan

Body and chassis
- Class: Mid-size luxury crossover SUV (E)
- Body style: 5-door coupe SUV
- Layout: Rear-motor, rear-wheel drive; All wheel drive
- Platform: Electric Smart Secure Architecture (ESSA)
- Related: Voyah Passion; Voyah Passion L

Powertrain
- Electric motor: 1× or 2× 1XM AC permanent magnet synchronous
- Power output: 300 kW (408 PS; 402 hp) (RWD); 475 kW (646 PS; 637 hp) (AWD)
- Transmission: 1-speed direct-drive
- Battery: 81 kWh Amber Battery 2.0 NMC; 98.1 kWh (100 kWh, net) Amber Battery 2.0 NMC
- Electric range: 570–901 km (354–560 mi) (CLTC)

Dimensions
- Wheelbase: 3,000 mm (118 in)
- Length: 5,050 mm (199 in)
- Width: 1,998 mm (79 in)
- Height: 1,636 mm (64.4 in)

The Voyah Passion S (Chinese: 岚图追光S; pinyin: Lántú Zhuīguāng S) is a battery electric mid-size luxury crossover SUV produced by Dongfeng under the Voyah brand.

== Overview ==
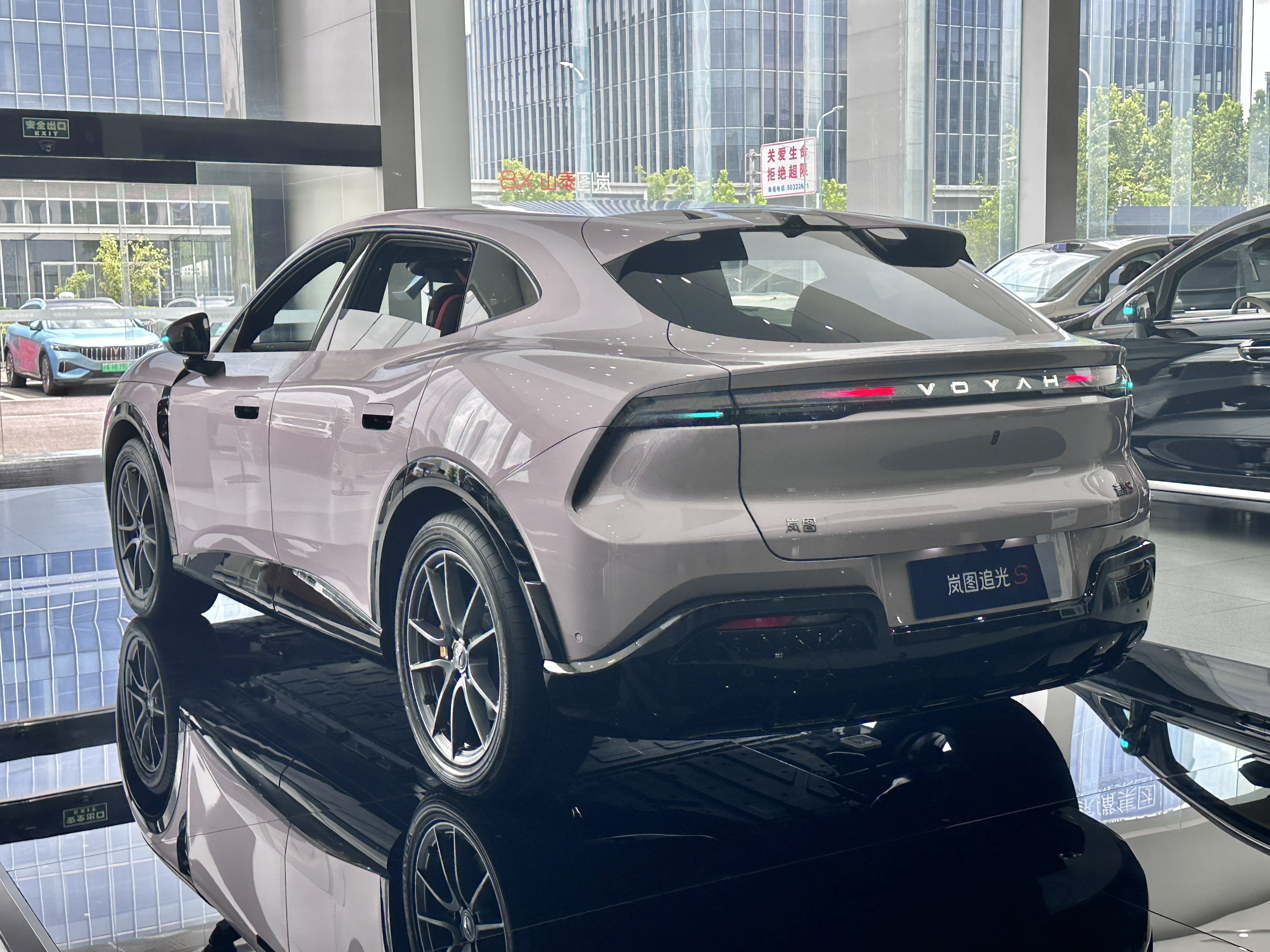
Rear view

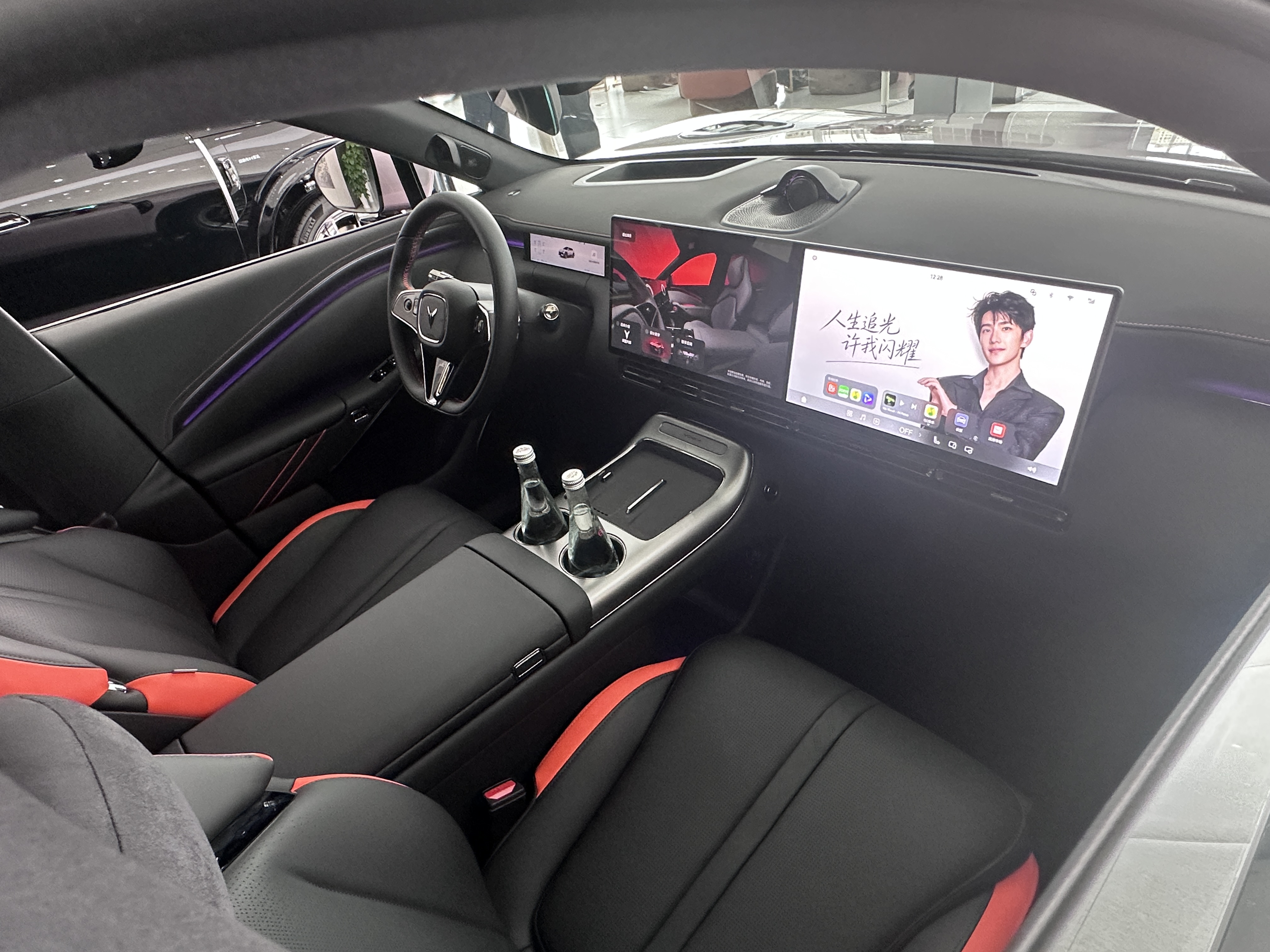
Interior

The Passion S was initially teased as the Voyah FE in 22 May 2026. It is positioned as a fastback SUV despite using the Passion and Passion L name found in Voyah existing full-size luxury sedan. It also features 10 sets of ducts that leads the air through the vehicle body via 18 different vents including a vent above the headlights that leads to an exit farther down the clamshell hood near the windshield.

Pre-sales started from July 24, with launch and deliveries commenced during the Chengdu Auto Show on August.

== Specifications ==
The base model has a single rear positioned motor with a power output of 408 hp, while the dual-motor version will be produce 646 hp. The Ultra+ version is the dual motor four wheel drive variant launched during the initial pre-sale launch. The Passion S features a 800V high-voltage silicon carbide platform which supports 5C fast charging. The Passion S also debuts the Amber Battery 2.0 with a 98 kWh capacity. The CLTC range of the Passion S is rated at 740km for the RWD version and 700km for the 4WD version.

For driving assistance, The Passion S features Huawei Qiankun ADS 5 advanced driver-assistance system with an 896-line LiDAR and HarmonyOS cockpit interior.

The interior features the HarmonyOS Cockpit 5.2 from Huawei, powered by the MoLA voice large model. The console includes a dual of 15.6-inch Huawei smart-linked screens and a 29-inch AR-HUD placed ahead.
