= Voyah Passion =

Full-size luxury sedan

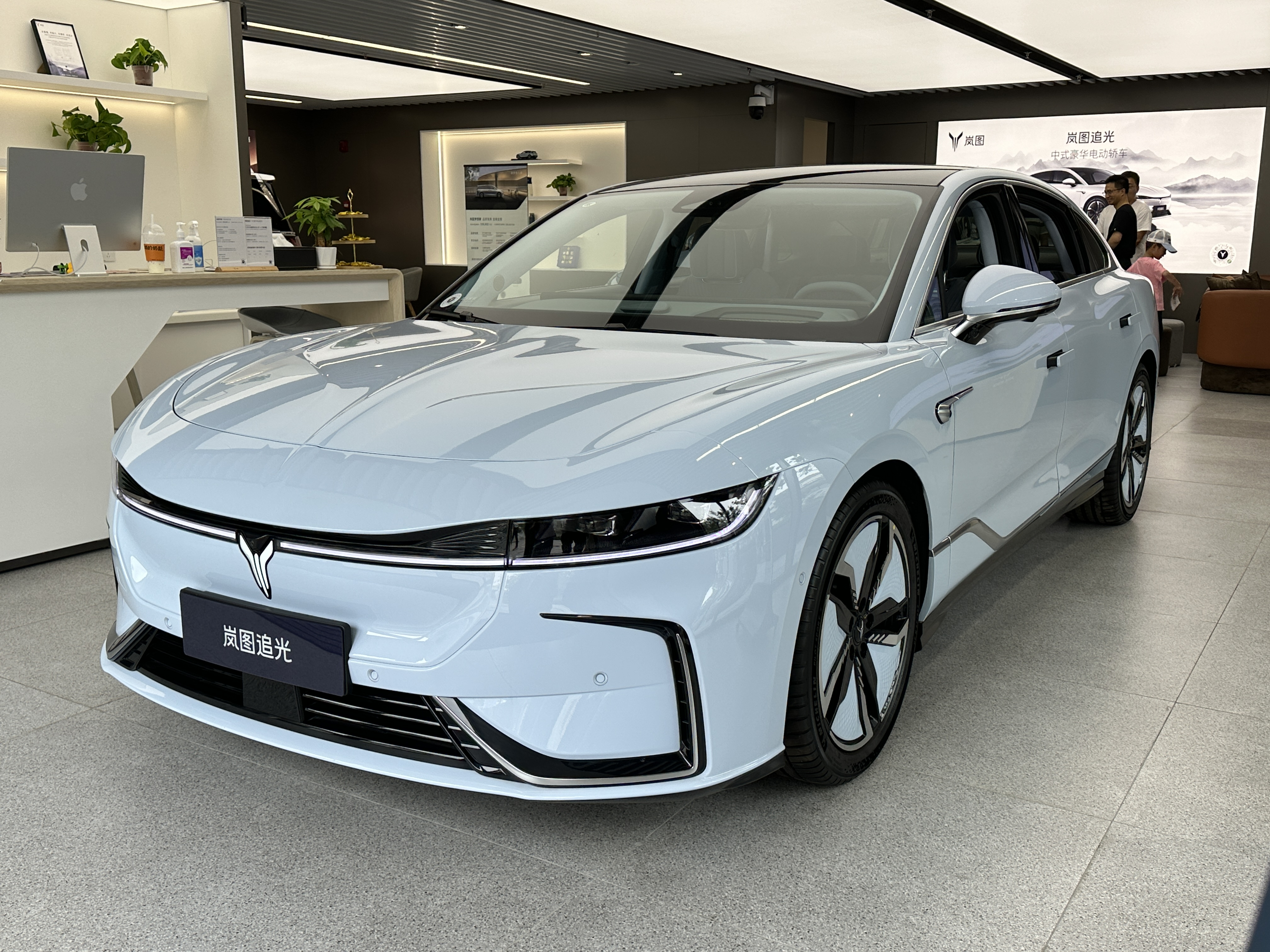
- Voyah Passion (EV)

Overview
- Manufacturer: Voyah
- Model code: H53
- Also called: Voyah Zhuiguang
- Production: 2022–present
- Assembly: China: Wuhan

Body and chassis
- Class: Full-size luxury car (E)
- Body style: 4-door sedan
- Layout: Dual-motor, all-wheel-drive; Front engine, dual-motor, all-wheel drive
- Platform: Electric Smart Secure Architecture (ESSA)
- Related: Voyah Courage; Voyah Dream; Voyah Free

Powertrain
- Engine: Petrol plug-in hybrid: 1.5 L ''DFMC15TE2 I4 turbo
- Electric motor: Permanent magnet synchronous motor
- Power output: 375–390 kW (503–523 hp; 510–530 PS)
- Transmission: 1-speed direct-drive
- Battery: 43 kWh NMC SVOLT; 82.11 kWh semi-solid state NMC Farasis; 108.73 kWh NMC CATL
- Range: 1,260 km (780 mi) (PHEV, CLTC)
- Electric range: 580–730 km (360–450 mi) (EV, CLTC); 202 km (126 mi) (PHEV, WLTP); 262 km (163 mi) (PHEV, CLTC)

Dimensions
- Wheelbase: 3,000 mm (118.1 in)
- Length: 5,088 mm (200.3 in)
- Width: 1,970 mm (77.6 in)
- Height: 1,505–1,515 mm (59.3–59.6 in)
- Curb weight: 2,245–2,286 kg (4,949–5,040 lb)

The Voyah Passion (Chinese: 岚图追光; pinyin: Lántú Zhuīguāng) is a battery electric and plug-in hybrid full-size luxury sedan produced by Dongfeng under the Voyah brand.

== Overview ==
In December 2022, the Voyah introduced its third model, which was also its first sedan in the form of the Passion luxury limousine. The car was maintained in an aesthetic identical to the Free SUV and Dream minivan, distinguished by a slender silhouette with hidden door handles, door ribbing and a gently sloping roofline reminiscent of fastback cars.

The front belt was formed by aggressively shaped headlights, which were joined by a light strip integrated with the company logo formed from LEDs. The rear part of the body was adorned with, among other things, an opening spoiler, while 31 sensors, 12 cameras, 5 radars and 12 ultrasonic sensors ensure movement in semi-autonomous driving mode. The Passion was based on a modular ESSA platform shared with the Free model, which allows, among other things, the flat location of the propulsion system batteries under the passenger cabin in a skateboard configuration. The luxuriously arranged interior was dominated by displays, which also formed an angled touchscreen air conditioning panel. In addition, the dashboard was covered by a strip of three 12.3-inch screens serving as the digital instrument display, a central infotainment touchscreen and a passenger entertainment display.

The Passion was released as a pure electric model in April 2023 in mainland China. The car can be purchased both in traditional form and through a so-called battery subscription model along the lines of the rival Nio. Prices for the luxury limousine start at 322,900 yuan.

In December 2023, Voyah introduced the plug-in hybrid version of the Passion with changes to the front and a lower purchase price.

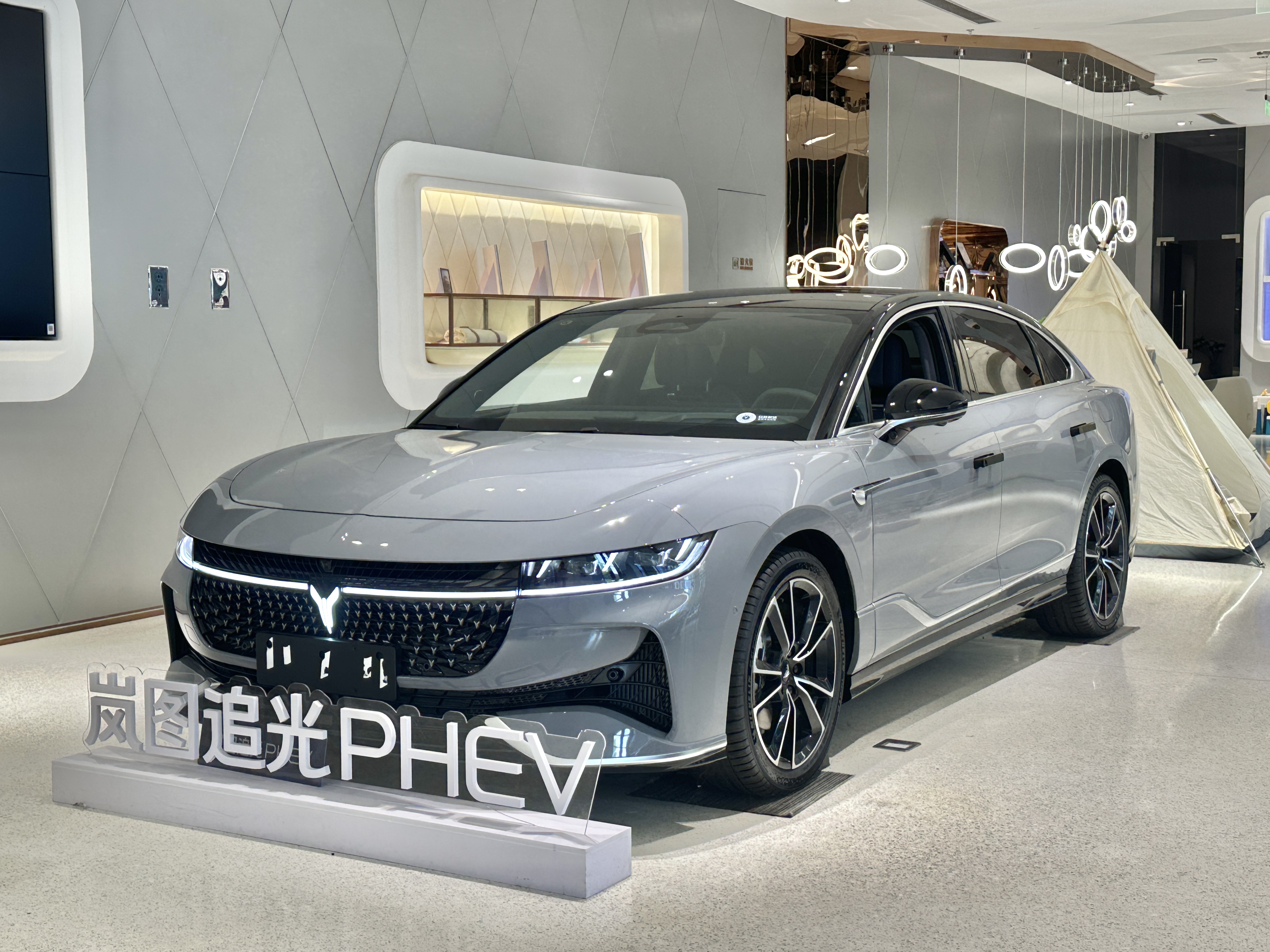
Voyah Passion (PHEV)

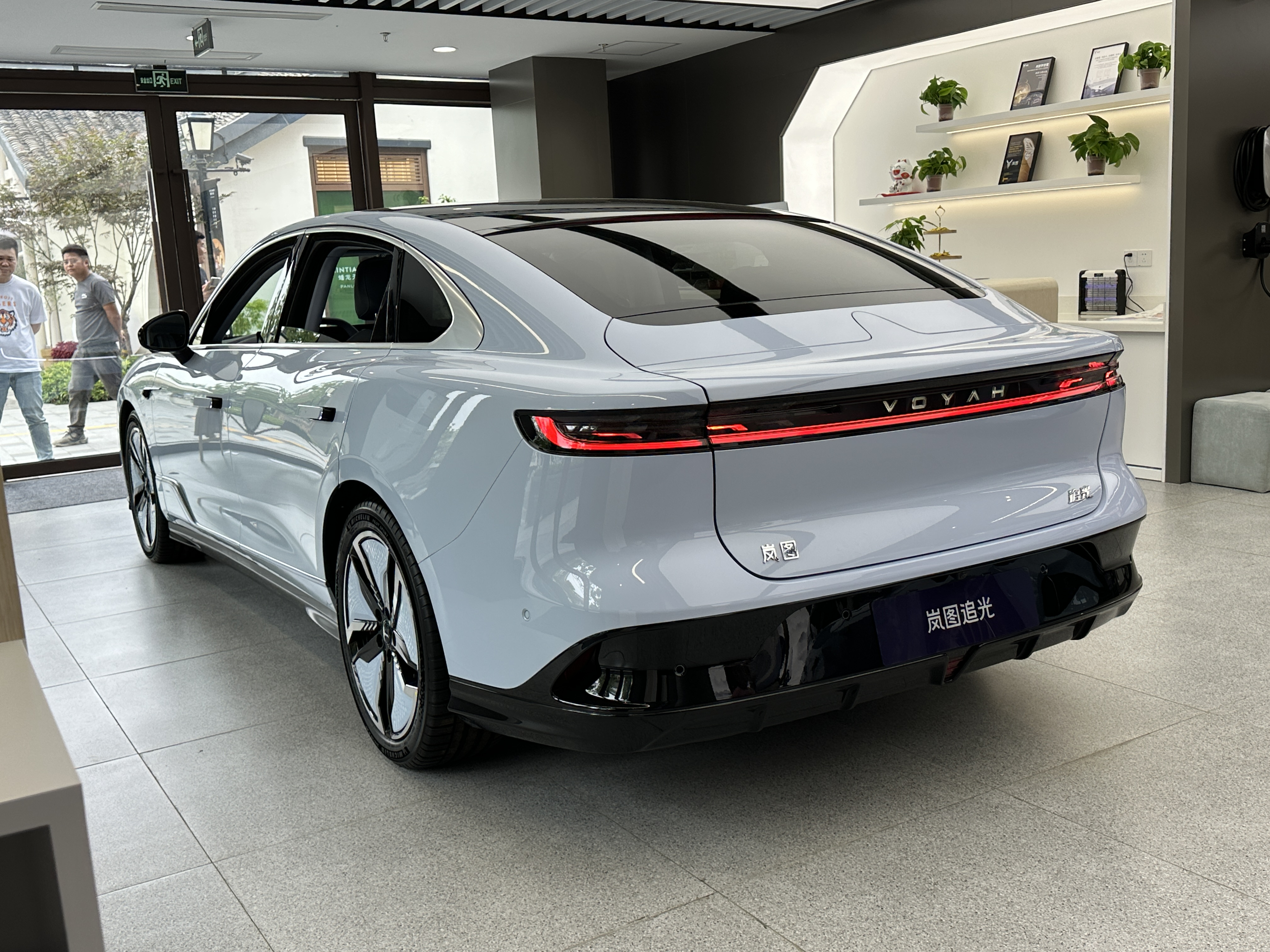
Rear view (EV)

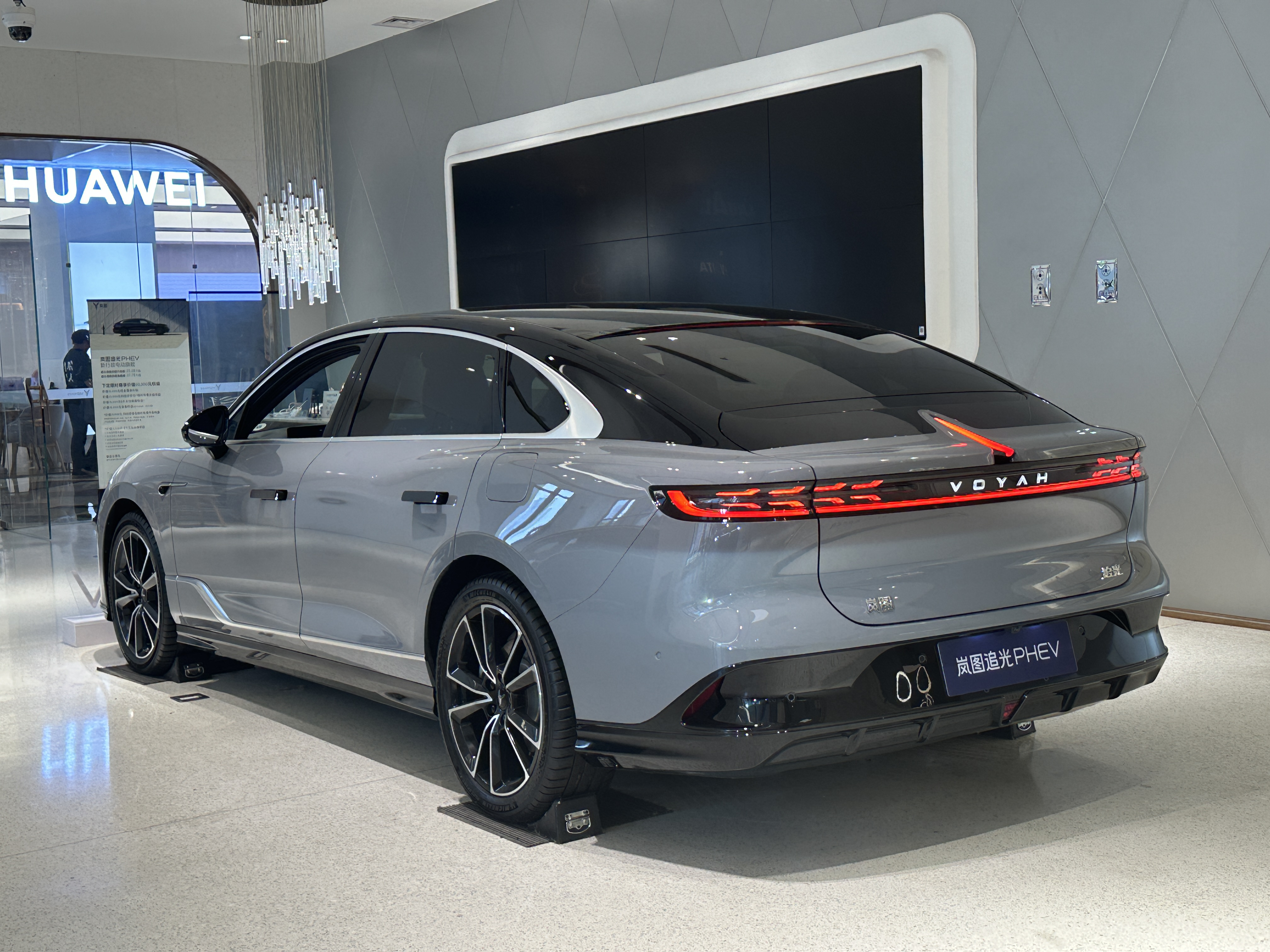
Rear view (PHEV)

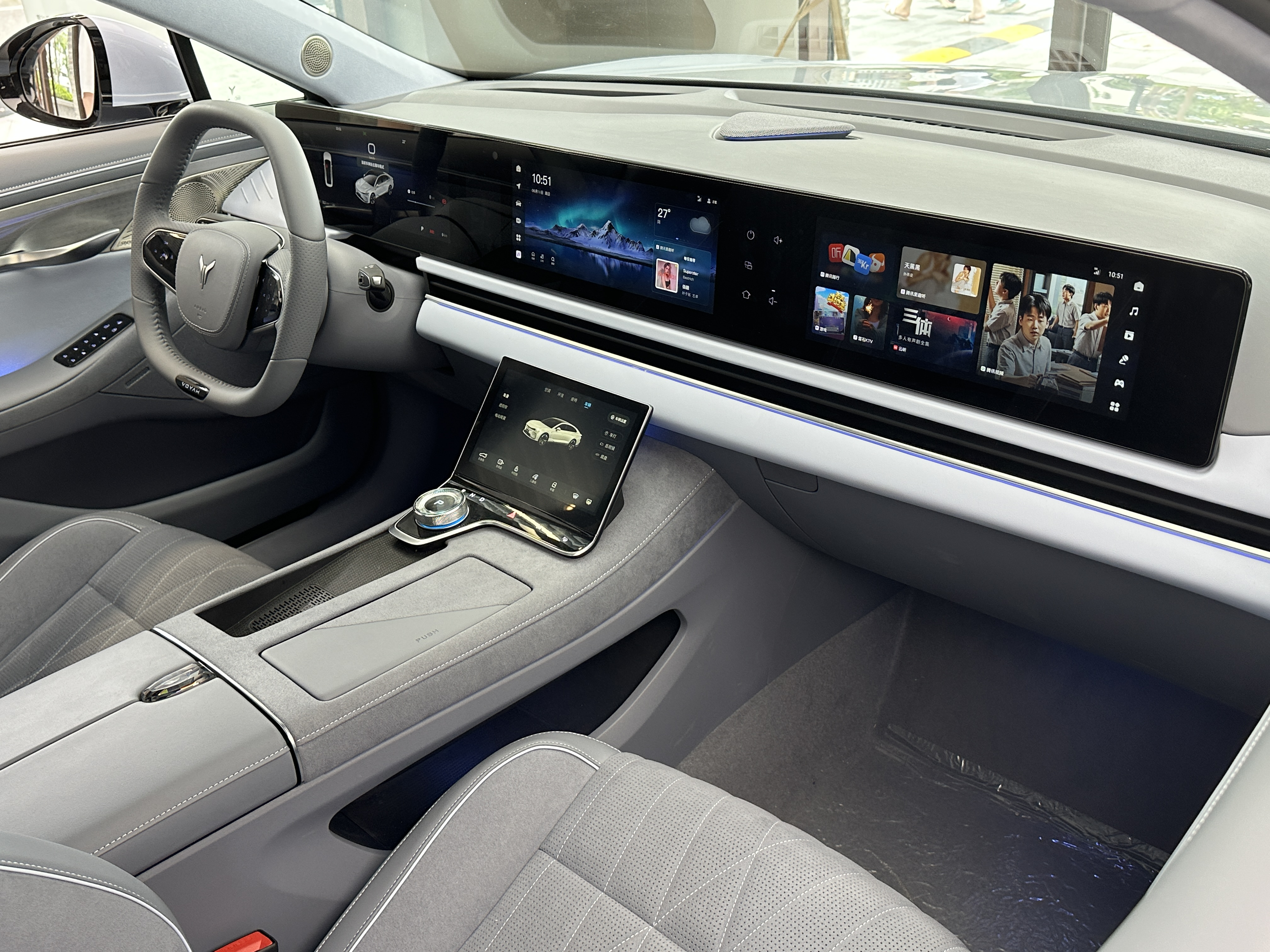
Interior

== Specifications ==
The Passion was initially available exclusively with a pure electric powertrain, with a plug-in hybrid version added later.

The pure electric model uses a dual-motor all-wheel-drive system consisting of a front motor outputting 160 kW (215 hp; 218 PS) and 310 N⋅m (229 lb⋅ft) of torque and a rear motor outputting 215 kW (288 hp; 292 PS) and 420 N⋅m (310 lb⋅ft) of torque, for a total of 375 kW (503 hp; 510 PS) and 730 N⋅m (538 lb⋅ft) of torque. This allows it to accelerate to 100 km/h (62 mph) in 3.8 seconds and a top speed of 210 km/h (130 mph). Buyers can choose between two battery packs: a 82.1 kWh NMC pack with a semi-solid-state electrolyte with a 170 Wh/kg energy density supplied by Farasis providing 580 km (360 mi) of range (CLTC), or a CATL-supplied 108.7 kWh NMC pack for 730 km (454 mi) on a single charge.

The plug-in hybrid system also uses a dual-motor all-wheel-drive system along with a 1.5-litre (1,467 cc; 89.5 cu in) turbocharged inline-four petrol engine outputting 100 kW (134 hp; 136 PS). It consists of a 130 kW (174 hp; 177 PS) front motor and a 160 kW (215 hp; 218 PS) rear motor, for a total of 390 kW (523 hp; 530 PS) with the engine. It has a 0– time of 5.9 seconds and a top speed of 200 km/h (124 mph). It comes with a 43 kWh NMC battery pack supplied by SVOLT providing 202 km (126 mi) of electric-only range (WLTP), with a combined range of 1,260 km (783 mi) (CLTC).

Specifications
Variant	Battery	Engine		Front motor		Rear motor		Combined		Range (CLTC)		0–	Top speed	Curb weight
Variant	Battery	Power	Torque	Power	Torque	Power	Torque	Power	Torque	EV	Total	0–	Top speed	Curb weight
PHEV	43 kWh NMC SVOLT	100 kW (134 hp; 136 PS) @4,500 rpm	200 N⋅m (148 lb⋅ft) @2,000–4,500 rpm	130 kW (174 hp; 177 PS)	300 N⋅m (221 lb⋅ft)	160 kW (215 hp; 218 PS)	310 N⋅m (229 lb⋅ft)	390 kW (523 hp; 530 PS)	810 N⋅m (597 lb⋅ft)	262 km (163 mi)	1,260 km (783 mi)	5.9 s	200 km/h (124 mph)	2,245 kg (4,949 lb)
EV	82.1 kWh semi-solid state NMC Farasis	—		160 kW (215 hp; 218 PS)	310 N⋅m (229 lb⋅ft)	215 kW (288 hp; 292 PS)	420 N⋅m (310 lb⋅ft)	375 kW (503 hp; 510 PS)	730 N⋅m (538 lb⋅ft)	580 km (360 mi)		3.8 s	210 km/h (130 mph)	2,266 kg (4,996 lb)
EV	108.7 kWh NMC CATL	—		160 kW (215 hp; 218 PS)	310 N⋅m (229 lb⋅ft)	215 kW (288 hp; 292 PS)	420 N⋅m (310 lb⋅ft)	375 kW (503 hp; 510 PS)	730 N⋅m (538 lb⋅ft)	730 km (454 mi)		4.2 s	205 km/h (127 mph)	2,286 kg (5,040 lb)

== Voyah Passion L ==
Voyah Passion L
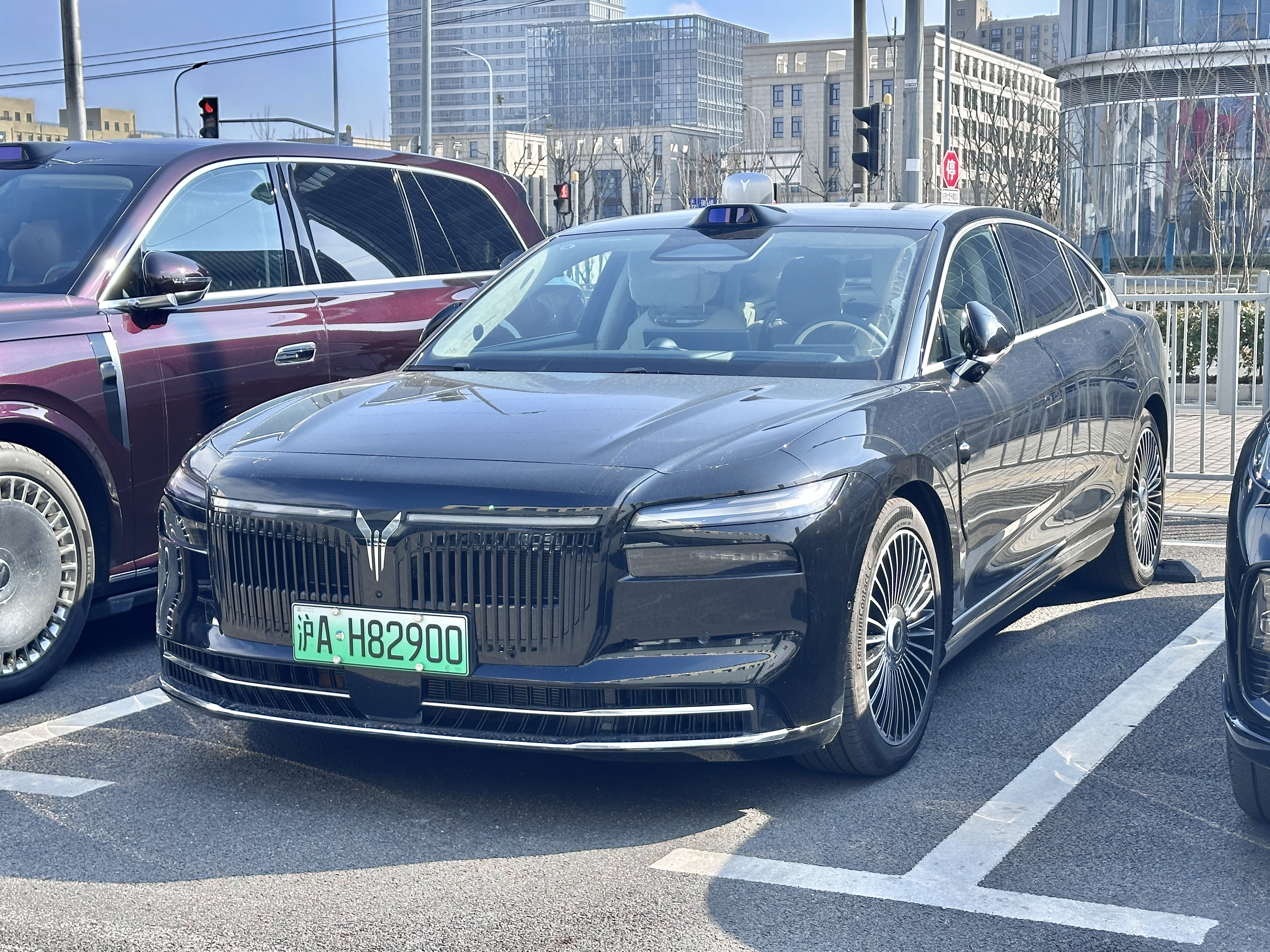

Overview
- Also called: Voyah Zhuiguang L
- Production: 2025–present
- Assembly: China: Wuhan

Body and chassis
- Layout: Front engine, dual-motor, all-wheel drive
- Platform: Electric Smart Secure Architecture (ESSA)
- Related: Voyah Passion S

Powertrain
- Engine: Petrol plug-in hybrid: 1.5 L ''DFMC15TE3 I4 turbo
- Electric motor: Permanent magnet synchronous
- Power output: 490 kW (660 hp; 670 PS)
- Transmission: 1-speed direct-drive
- Battery: NMC SVOLT
- Electric range: 300 km (190 mi)

Dimensions
- Wheelbase: 3,010 mm (118.5 in)
- Length: 5,125 mm (201.8 in)
- Width: 1,985 mm (78.1 in)
- Height: 1,522 mm (59.9 in)
- Curb weight: 2,370 kg (5,225 lb)

The Voyah Passion L (Chinese: 岚图追光L; pinyin: Lántú Zhuīguāng L) is the updated version of the Passion, with increased dimensions and integration of Huawei technologies.

Compared the original Passion, the Passion L has a 10 mm (0.39 in) longer wheelbase, and increased length, width, and height of 37 mm (1.5 in), 15 mm (0.59 in), and 7 mm (0.28 in), respectively. The front gets a significant styling change with a chrome vertical grille and a narrow split headlight design, and the body is available with two-tone paint.

It continues to be available in plug-in hybrid form, with updates to the engine and motors. The 1.5-litre (1,497 cc; 91.4 cu in) turbocharged petrol engine is updated to output 110 kW (148 hp; 150 PS), and the front and rear motors now output 150 kW (201 hp; 204 PS) and 230 kW (308 hp; 313 PS), respectively for a total of 490 kW (657 hp; 666 PS). It uses an SVOLT-supplied NMC pack with about 300 km (190 mi) of electric range, and has a top speed of 200 km/h (124 mph).

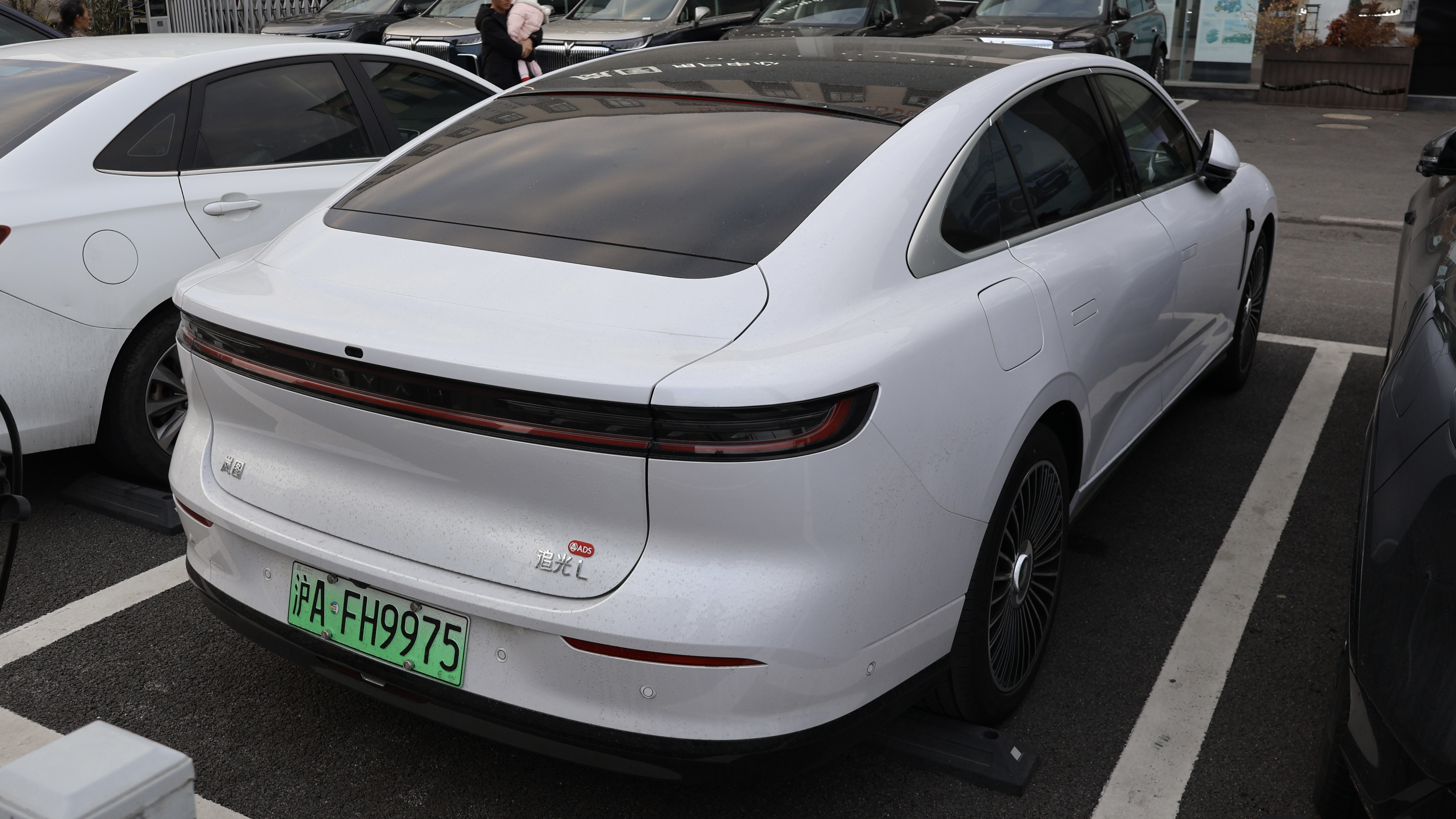
Rear view

== Sales ==
Passion
Year	China		Total
Year	EV	PHEV	Total
2022	22	—	22
2023	3,651	1,314	4,965
2024	839	5,510	6,349
2025	329	2145	3,424

Passion L
Year	China
2025	950
