= Voyah i-Land =

Overview
- Manufacturer: Dongfeng Motor Corporation / Italdesign Giugiaro (Voyah)
- Production: 2020
- Assembly: Italy: Moncalieri (Italdesign)
- Designer: Italdesign Giugiaro

Body and chassis
- Class: concept car
- Body style: 2-door coupé
- Platform: Electric Smart Secure Architecture
- Doors: Gullwing

Powertrain
- Electric motor: 2x AC induction/asynchronous, Permanent magnet motor
- Transmission: 1-speed direct-drive reduction
- Battery: Li-ion

The Voyah i-Land is a concept electric grand tourer designed by Italdesign and presented in 2020 for the new Chinese brand Voyah, a subsidiary of Dongfeng Motor Corporation.

== Presentation ==
The Voyah i-Land concept was presented at 2020 Auto China. The i-Land foreshadows the first model of the electric brand Voyah scheduled for 2021.

== Technical characteristics ==
The Voyah i-Land is based on the technical platform ESSA (Electric, Smart Secure Architecture) from the manufacturer Dongfeng. It has 2 butterfly doors, and 3 seats, a passenger seat and two rear seats.
