= Voyah =

Chinese luxury automotive manufacturer

Voyah Automotive Technology Co., Ltd.
- Native name: 岚图汽车科技股份有限公司
- Romanized name: Lántú qìchē kējì gǔfèn yǒuxiàn gōngsī
- Type: Subsidiary
- Industry: Automotive
- Founded: 2019
- Headquarters: Wuhan, Hubei, China
- Area served: China, Russia, Israel, Turkey, Belarus, Norway
- Key people: Lu Fang (Chairman)
- Parent: Dongfeng Motor Corporation
- Website: www.voyah.com.cn (China) www.voyah-global.com (Global)

Voyah (Chinese: 岚图; pinyin: Lántú) is the luxury subsidiary of Chinese state-owned automaker Dongfeng Motor Corporation. Voyah was founded in April 2019, specializing in designing and developing premium electric vehicles. Dongfeng Motor Corporation unveiled its brand logo at the Big House Contemporary Art Center in Wuhan on 17 July 2020.

It emerged from Dongfeng Renault after Renault exited the joint venture in 2020, with its factory being repurposed for Voyah vehicle production.

== History ==
On 17 July 2020, Dongfeng Motor Corporation introduced Voyah and its brand logo at the Big House Contemporary Art Center in Wuhan. The Voyah brand was launched in September 2020 during the 2020 Beijing Auto Show alongside the i-Free and i-Land concepts, which preview the Voyah Free premium SUV that was introduced in 2021. The design of Voyah vehicles were co-developed with ItalDesign. Both concept vehicles previewed the production cars of Voyah in the following years, and the initial concept and production cars are all built on Dongfeng's Essa electric platform.

On 18 December 2020, Voyah's launched its first model, the Free mid-size crossover SUV, which is available with an extended range or pure electric powertrain. The NEDC comprehensive cruising range is 860 km (530 mi) for the extended range model and 500 km (310 mi) for the pure electric model.

On 22 January 2024, Voyah and Huawei signed a strategic cooperation agreement, where both parties will carry out cooperation in intelligent vehicle development in the Huawei Inside model.

On 9 April 2024, Voyah's 100,000th vehicle, a Voyah Dream, rolled off the assembly line.

On 18 March 2026, Voyah made its debut on the Hong Kong Stock Exchange.

== Products ==
- Voyah Passion (2023–present), full-size sedan, BEV/PHEV
  - Voyah Passion L (2025–present), upmarket variant of Passion, PHEV
- Voyah Passion S (2026–present), mid-size coupe SUV, BEV
- Voyah Taishan (2025–present), full-size SUV, PHEV
  - Voyah Taishan X8 (2026–present), 5-seat version of Taishan, BEV/PHEV
- Voyah Free (2021–present), mid-size SUV, BEV/REEV
  - Voyah Free+ (2025–present), updated variant of Free, mid-size SUV, PHEV
- Voyah Courage (2024–present), mid-size SUV, BEV
- Voyah Dreamer (2022–present), full-size MPV, BEV/PHEV
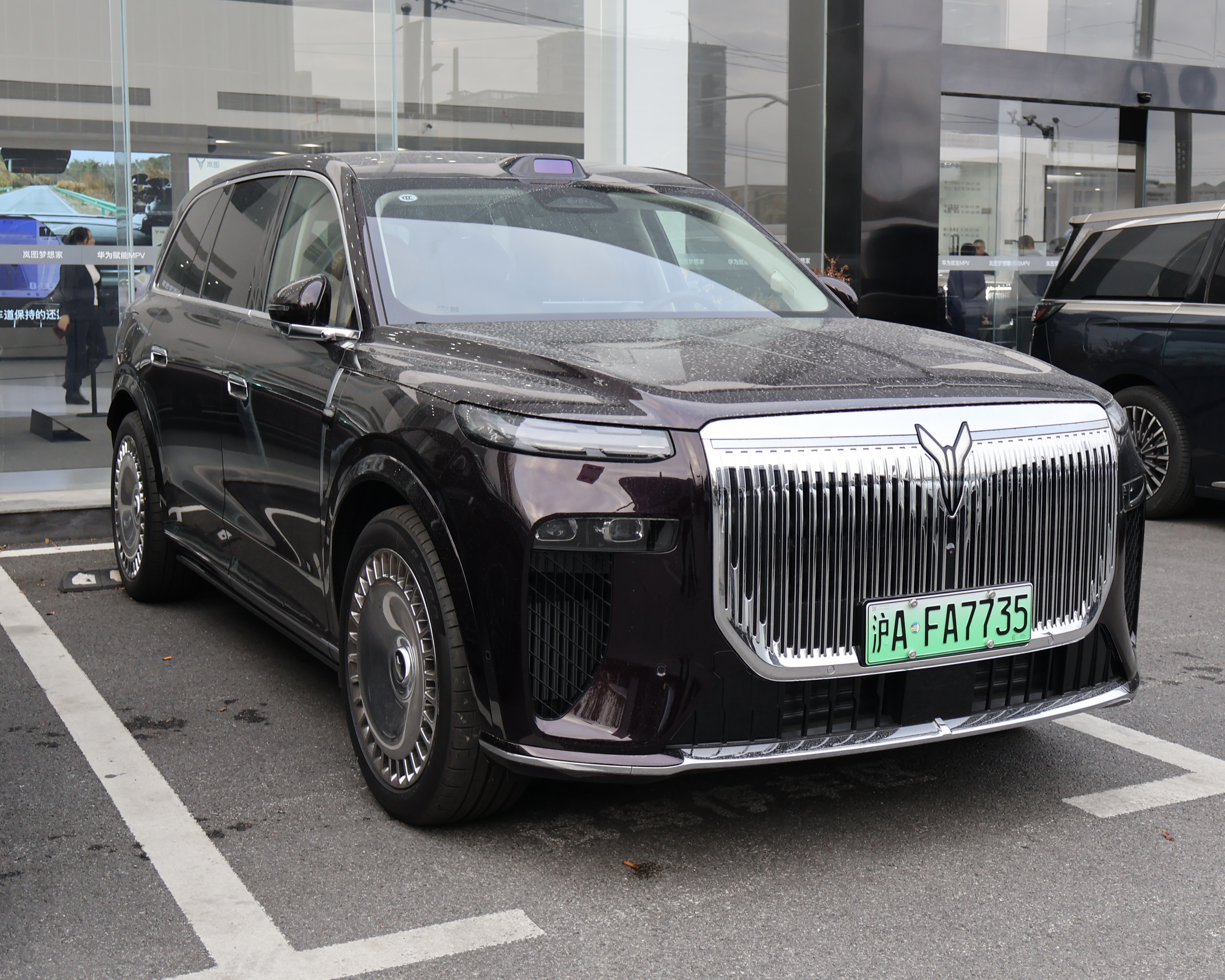
Voyah Taishan

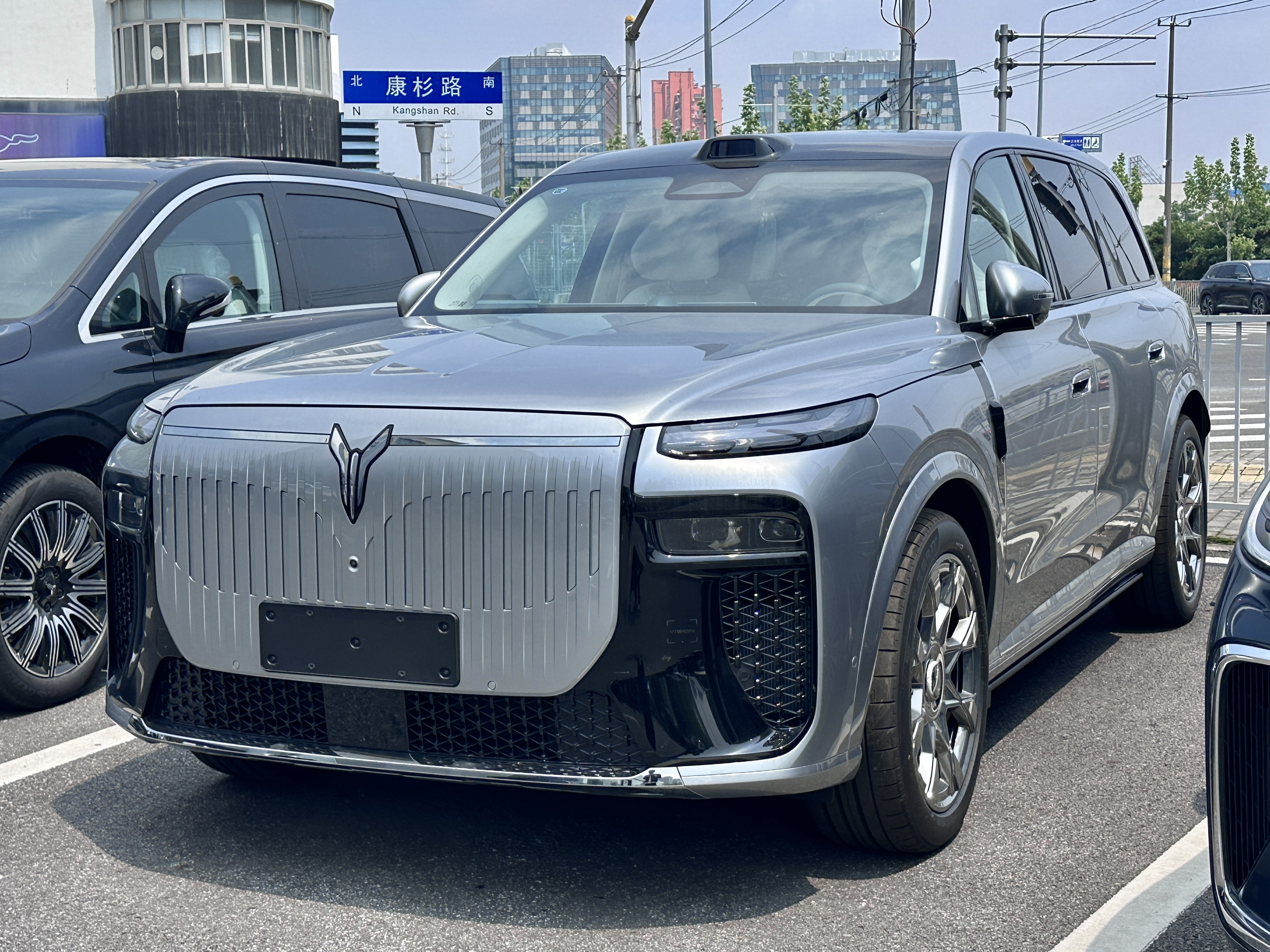
Voyah Taishan X8

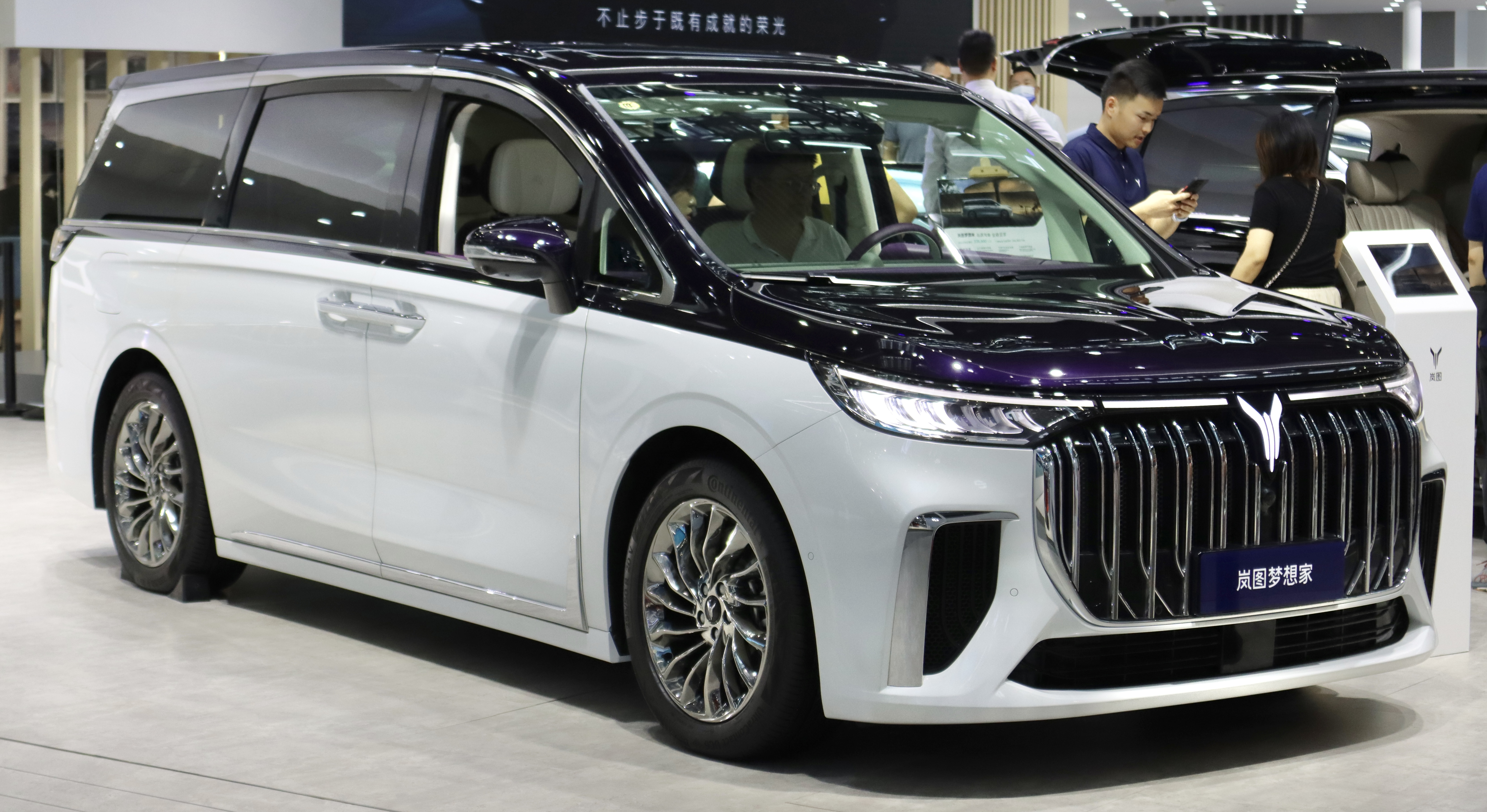
Voyah Dreamer

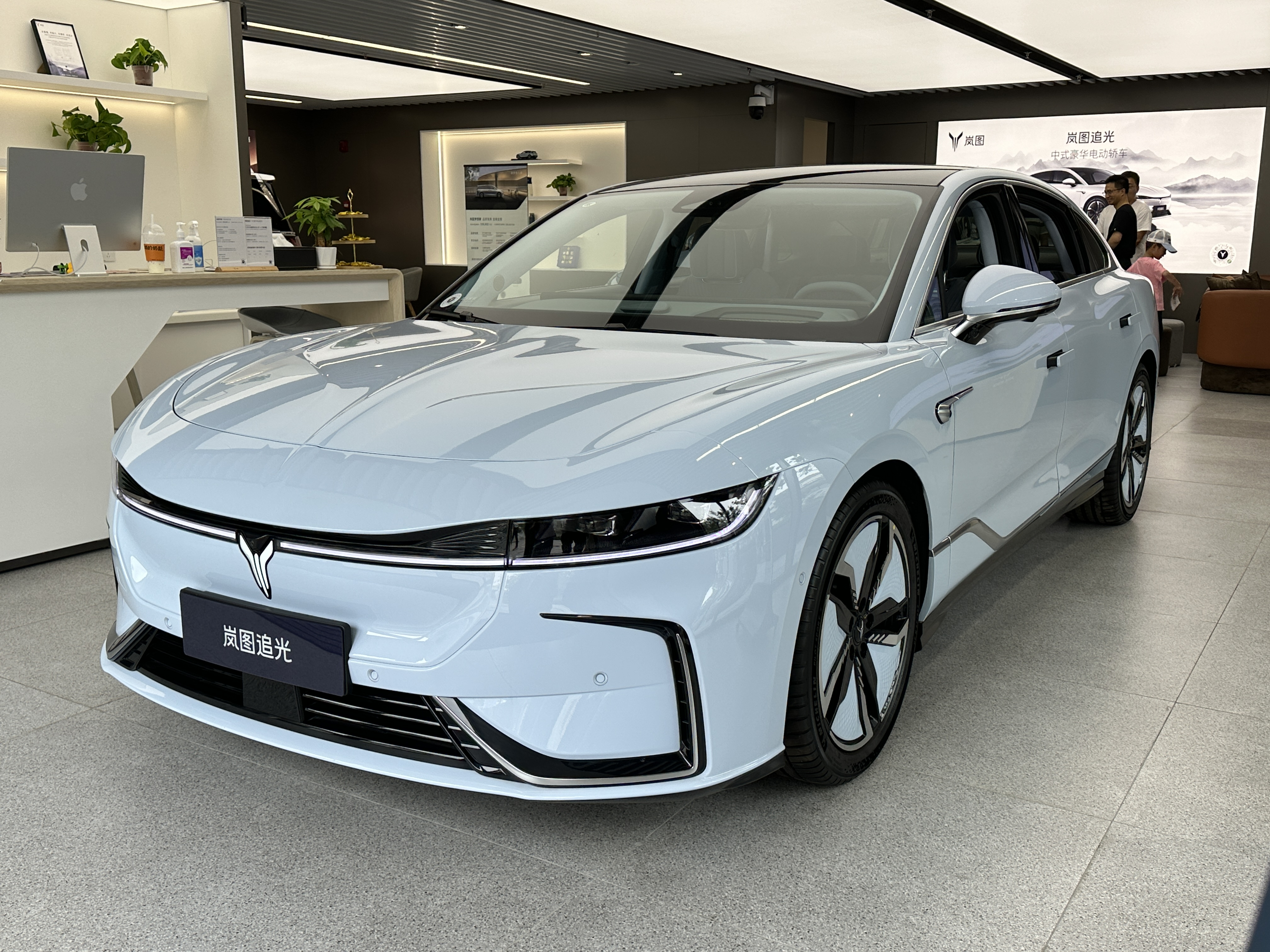
Voyah Passion

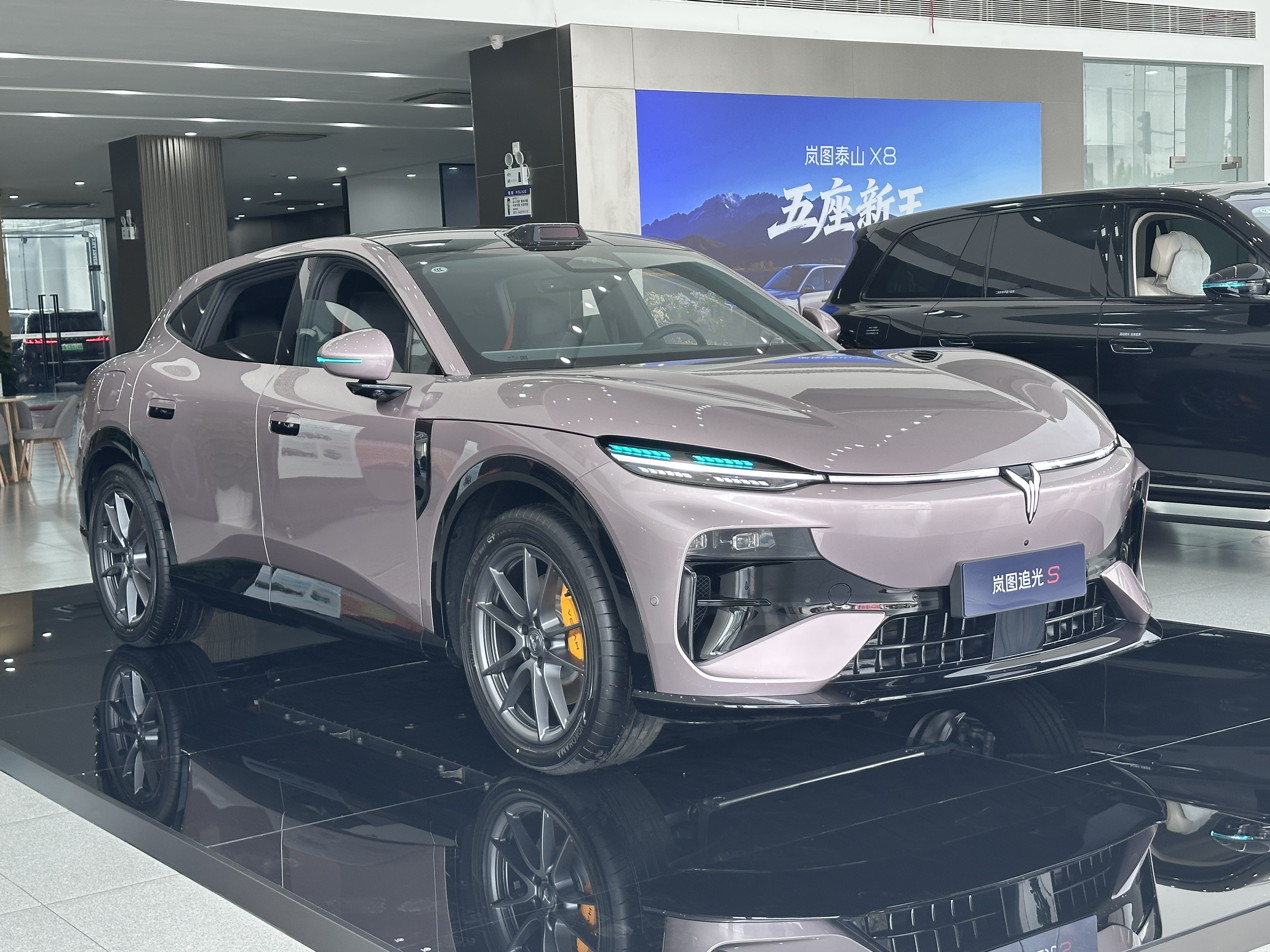
Voyah Passion S

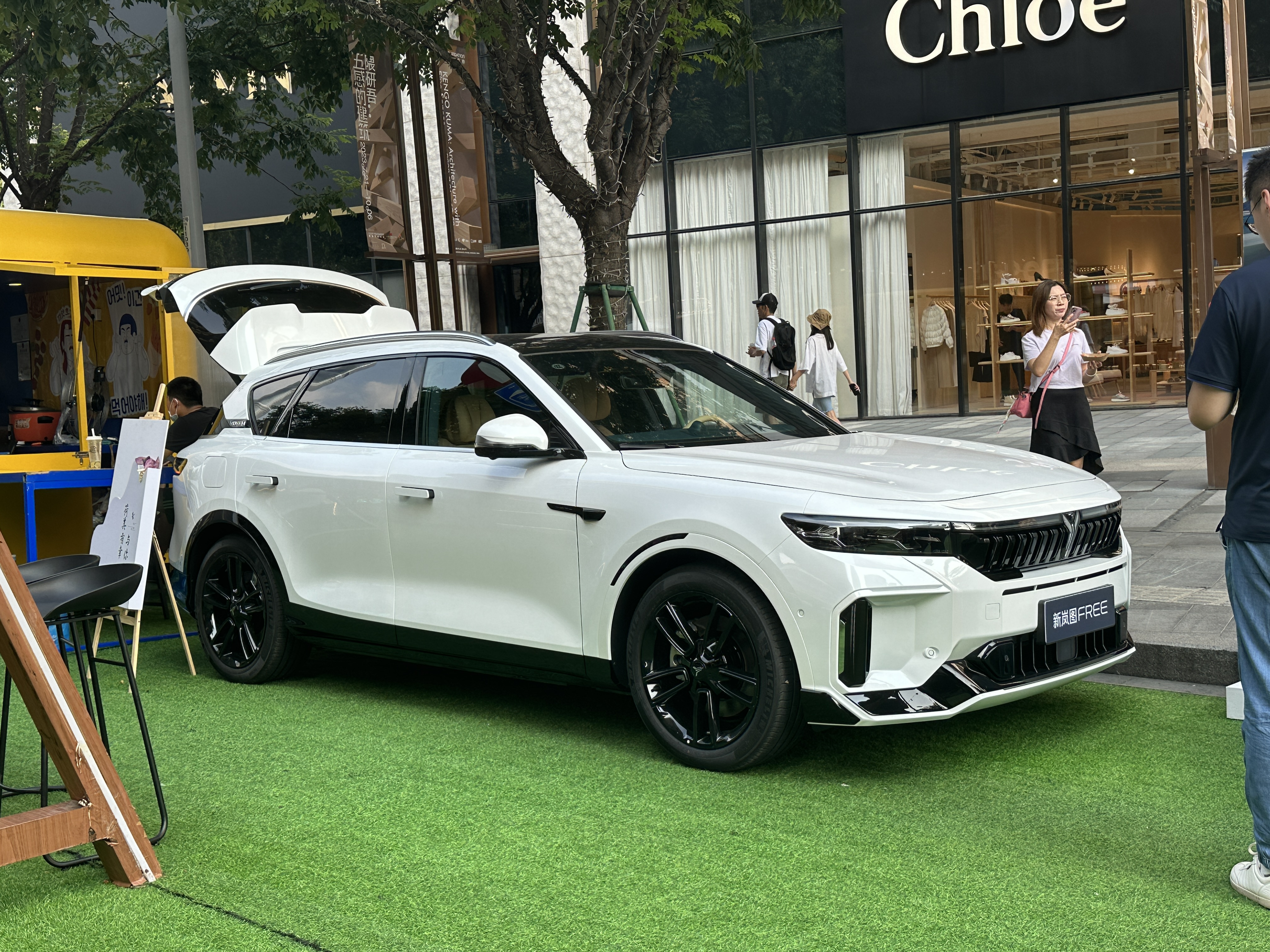
Voyah Free

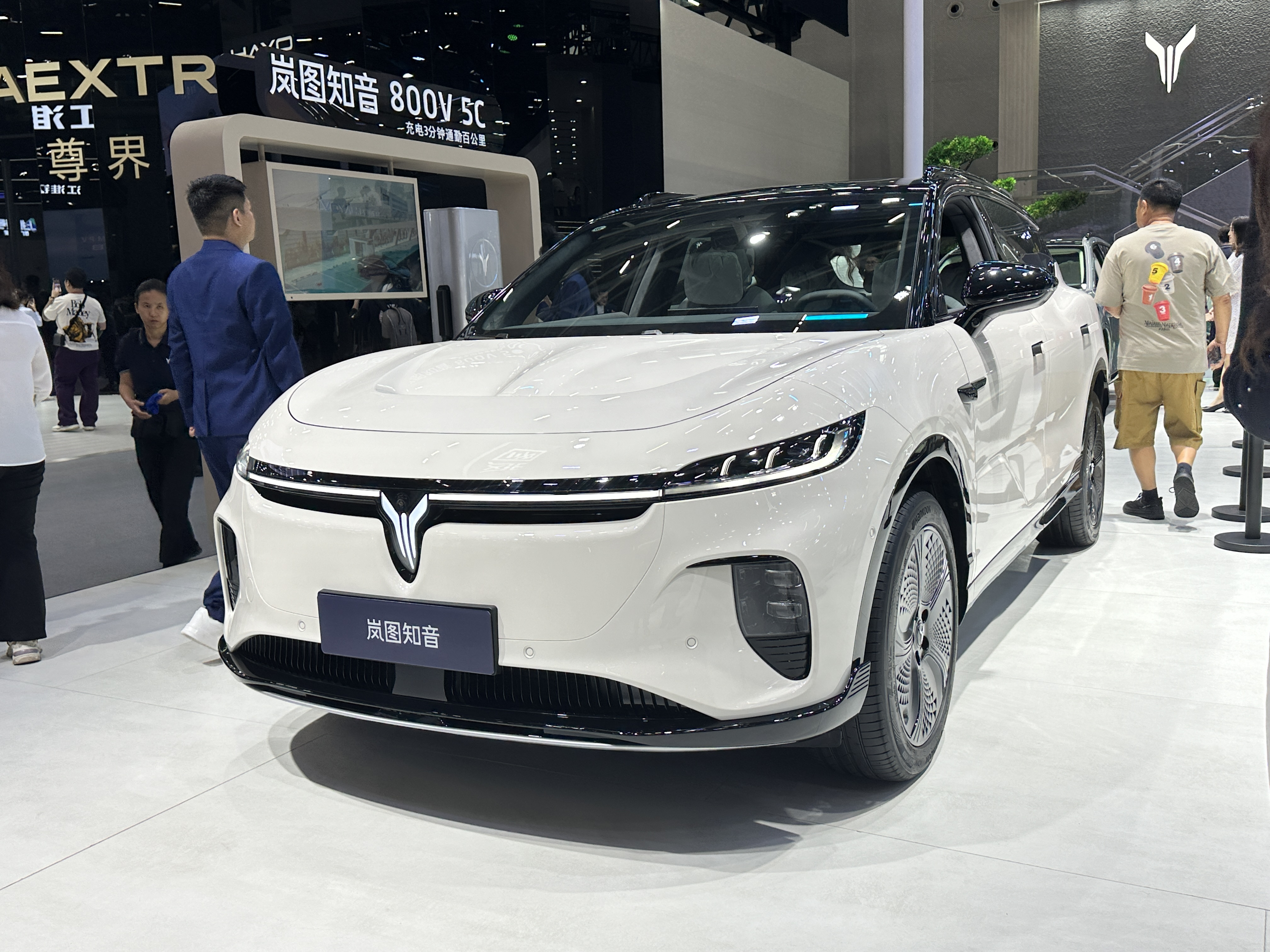
Voyah Courage

== Overseas operations ==
In overseas markets, Voyah entered the Norway market In June 2022, Israel in April 2023 and Belarus in July 2023. In January 2024, Voyah expanded into Southern Europe with upcoming entries into Spain and Portugal, and in April 2024 Voyah launched in Italy.

In August 2024, Dongfeng Motor launched the Voyah brand in Lebanon alongside the M-Hero brand.

== See also ==
- Automobile manufacturers and brands of China
- List of automobile manufacturers of China
