= Voyah Taishan =

Full-size luxury SUV

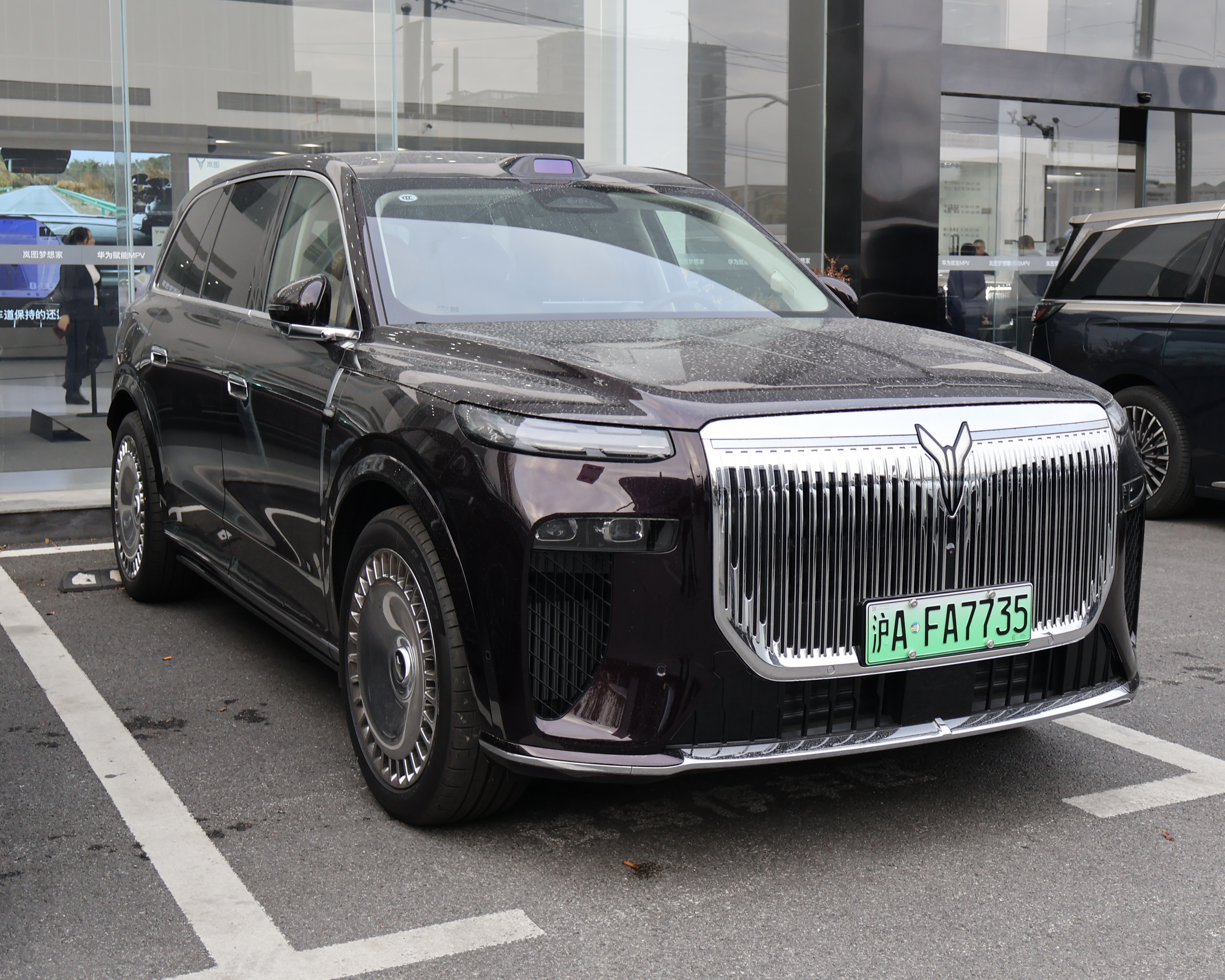

Overview
- Manufacturer: Voyah
- Also called: Voyah Taishan X8 (5-seater version)
- Production: September 2025 – present
- Assembly: China: Wuhan

Body and chassis
- Class: Full-size luxury SUV (F)
- Body style: 5-door SUV
- Layout: EV: (X8); Dual-motor, all-wheel-drive; PHEV: Front-engine, dual-motor, all-wheel-drive
- Platform: Tianyuan Architecture

Powertrain
- Engine: Gasoline plug-in hybrid: 1.5 L DFMC15TE3 turbo I4
- Power output: EV: 637 hp (475 kW; 646 PS) (X8); PHEV: 657 hp (490 kW; 666 PS); 489–510 hp (365–380 kW; 496–517 PS) (X8, initial output); 637–657 hp (475–490 kW; 646–666 PS) (X8, from launch)
- Hybrid drivetrain: Series-parallel (plug-in hybrid)
- Battery: 65 kWh CATL NMC (PHEV); 98 or 120 kWh of unknown material or manufacturer (X8 EV); 44.5 kWh Sunwoda LFP (X8 PHEV)
- Range: EV: 375–452 mi (604–727 km) (X8); PHEV: 870 mi (1,400 km); Up to 936 mi (1,506 km) (X8)
- Electric range: 152–230 mi (245–370 km)

Dimensions
- Wheelbase: 3,120 mm (122.8 in); 3,090 mm (121.7 in) (X8)
- Length: 5,230 mm (205.9 in); 5,200 mm (204.7 in) (X8)
- Width: 2,025 mm (79.7 in)
- Height: 1,817 mm (71.5 in); 1,814 mm (71.4 in) (X8)
- Curb weight: 2,760 kg (6,085 lb); 2,765–2,815 kg (6,096–6,206 lb) (X8)

The Voyah Taishan (Chinese: 岚图泰山; pinyin: Lántú Tàishān) and Voyah Taishan X8 (Chinese: 岚图泰山X8; pinyin: Lántú Tàishān X8) are battery electric and plug-in hybrid full-size luxury SUVs produced by Dongfeng under the Voyah brand.

== Overview ==
The Taishan was positioned as the brand's flagship model. It is a six-seater (2+2+2 seating configuration) full-size SUV. As part of a publicity stunt, a prototype version of the Taishan, covered with Louis Vuitton-themed camouflage, was parked in front of Louis Vuitton's The Louis exhibition building in Shanghai.

Photos released from the MIIT revealed that it was planned to be alternatively named the Voyah 9L or Voyah 9L Taishan. However the Taishan name was kept for the production model.

Pre-orders began on September 26, 2025. The Taishan officially launched on November 18, 2025.

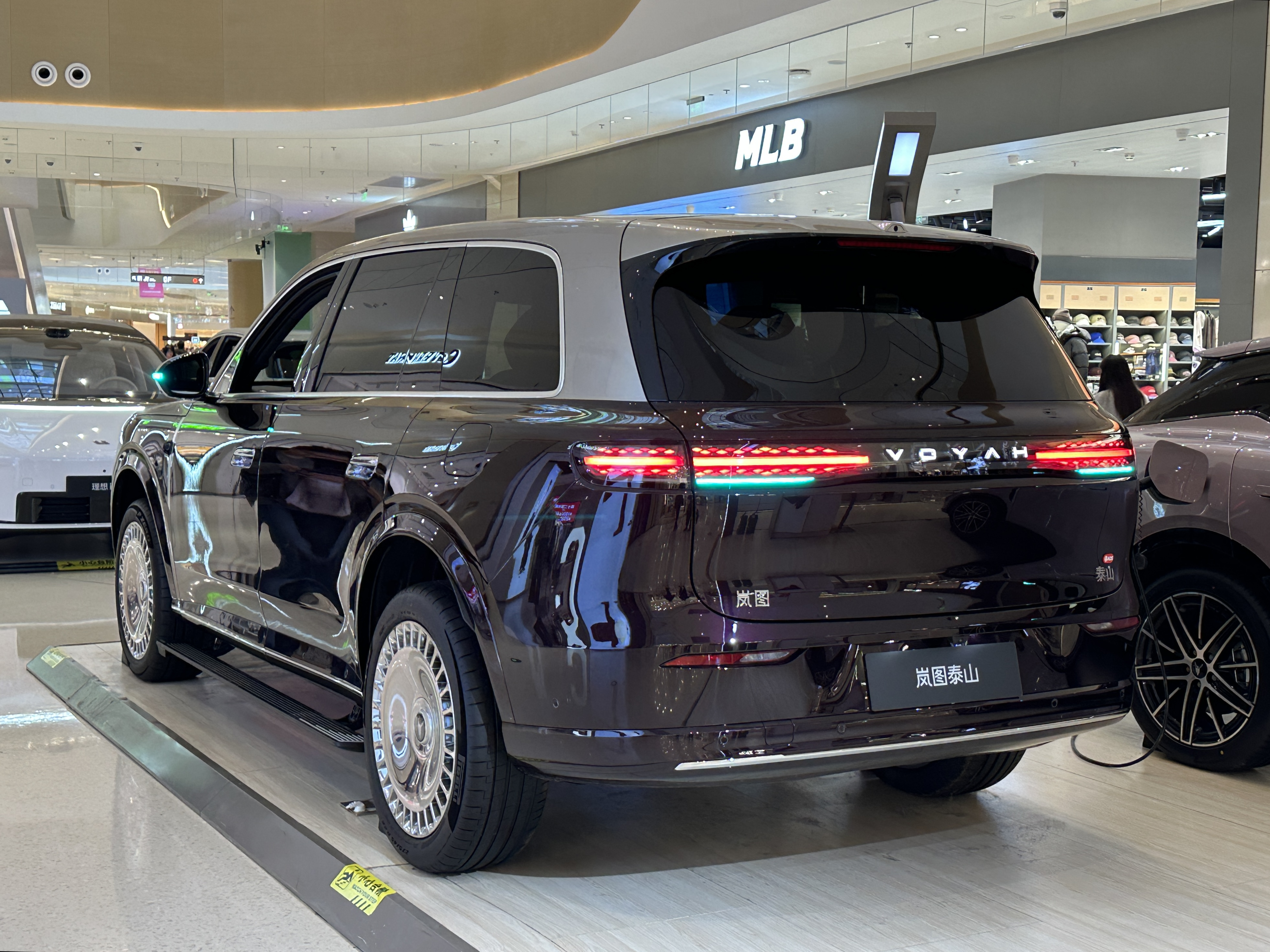
Rear view

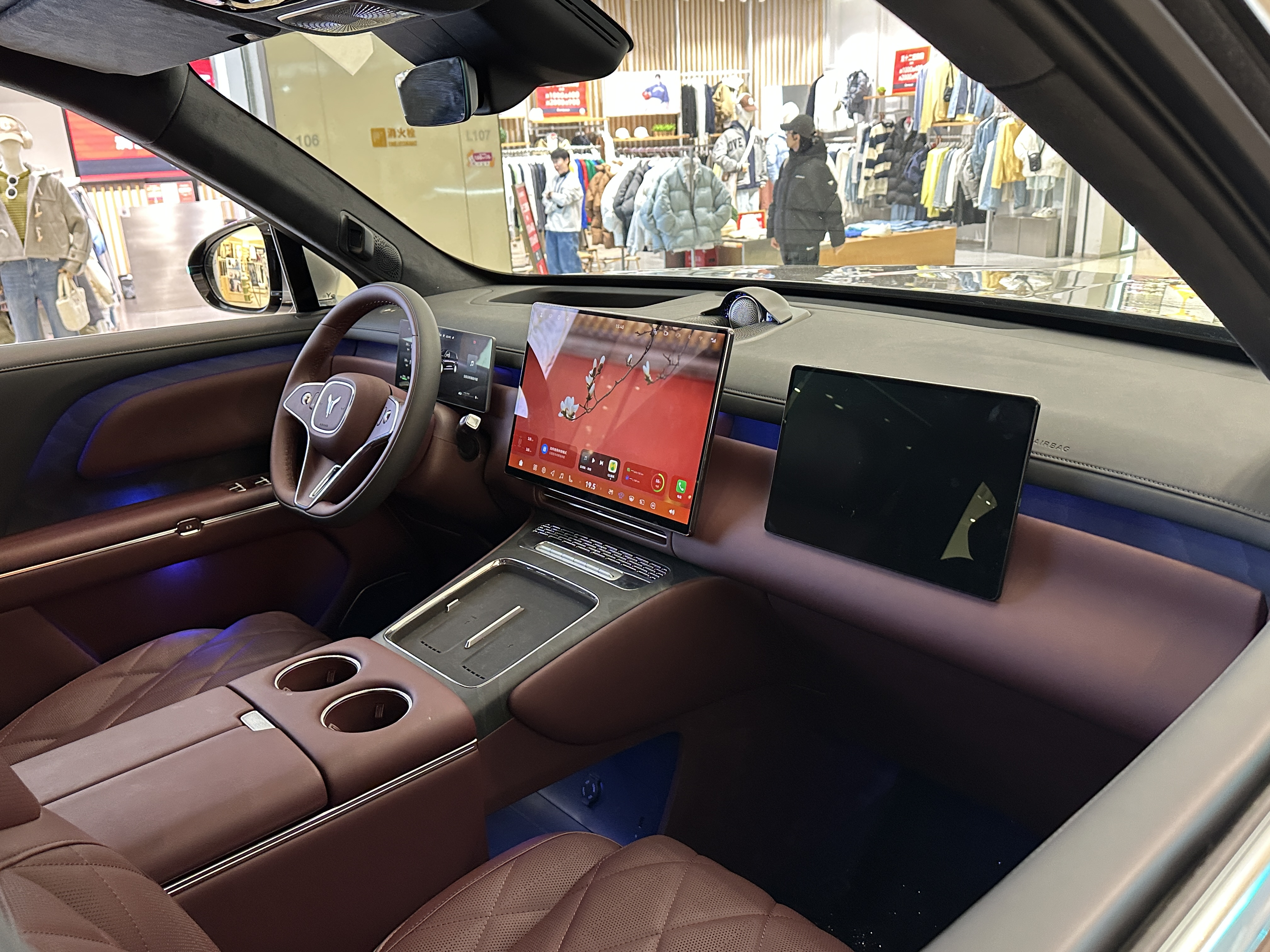
Interior

=== Design ===
The Taishan's front end features a silver waterfall-like grille design, slim headlights, a light bar going the entire width of the front grille, and an illuminated logo. The daytime running lights on both sides are inspired by the oracle bone script character for "water" and are made by Huawei. A continuous light bar is present at the rear alongside a spoiler mounted at the top. The door handles use a semi-hidden design and are also illuminated.

=== Features ===
The front row of the Taishan's interior features a floating central touchscreen, an LCD instrument display, an augmented reality heads-up display, and a column shifter. The second row uses captain chairs with integrated touchscreens, armrests with cup holders, and speakers integrated into the headrests. The Taishan also has a split sunroof, a ceiling-mounted screen, folding tables, and a built-in refrigerator. Huawei's ADS 4 system with 4 LiDARs will come standard, as well as air suspension and four-wheel steering.

== Voyah Taishan X8 ==
The Voyah Taishan X8 is considered to be the 5-seater version of the Taishan. Its length and wheelbase are both 30 millimeters less than that of the Taishan and is 3 millimeters shorter in terms of height. It is also heavier than the regular Taishan. The Taishan X8 was unveiled on March 19, 2026, alongside Voyah's Hong Kong stock market debut.

It made its debut on April 1, 2026. The X8 is the first vehicle to use Huawei's new version of HarmonyOS that utilizes two 15.6-inch central touchscreens capable of a brightness of 1000 nit and both screens have the capability to operate independently of each other.

Voyah officially launched the Taishan X8 on May 22, 2026, with a starting price of ¥292,000 ($43,100).

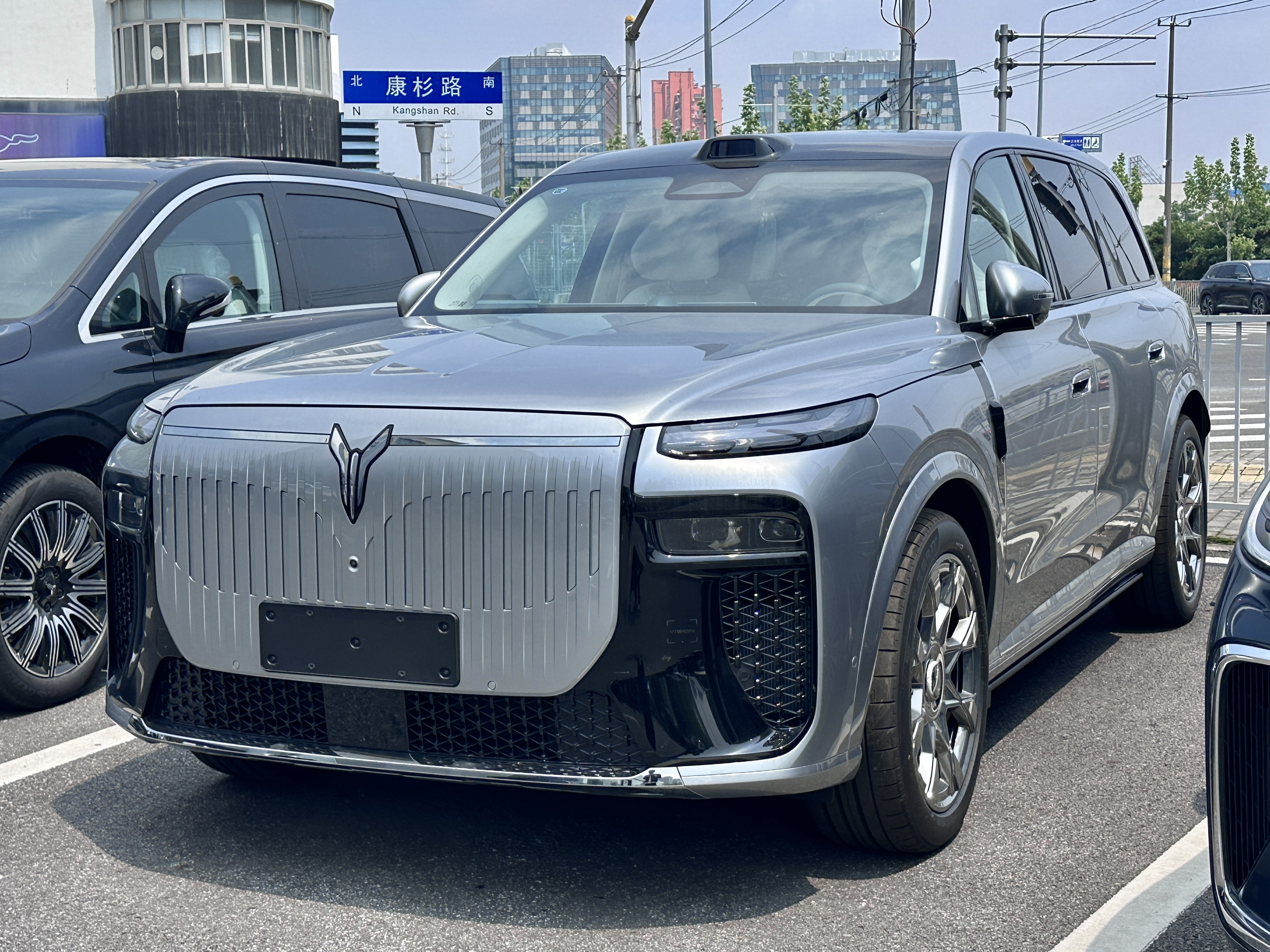
Voyah Taishan X8

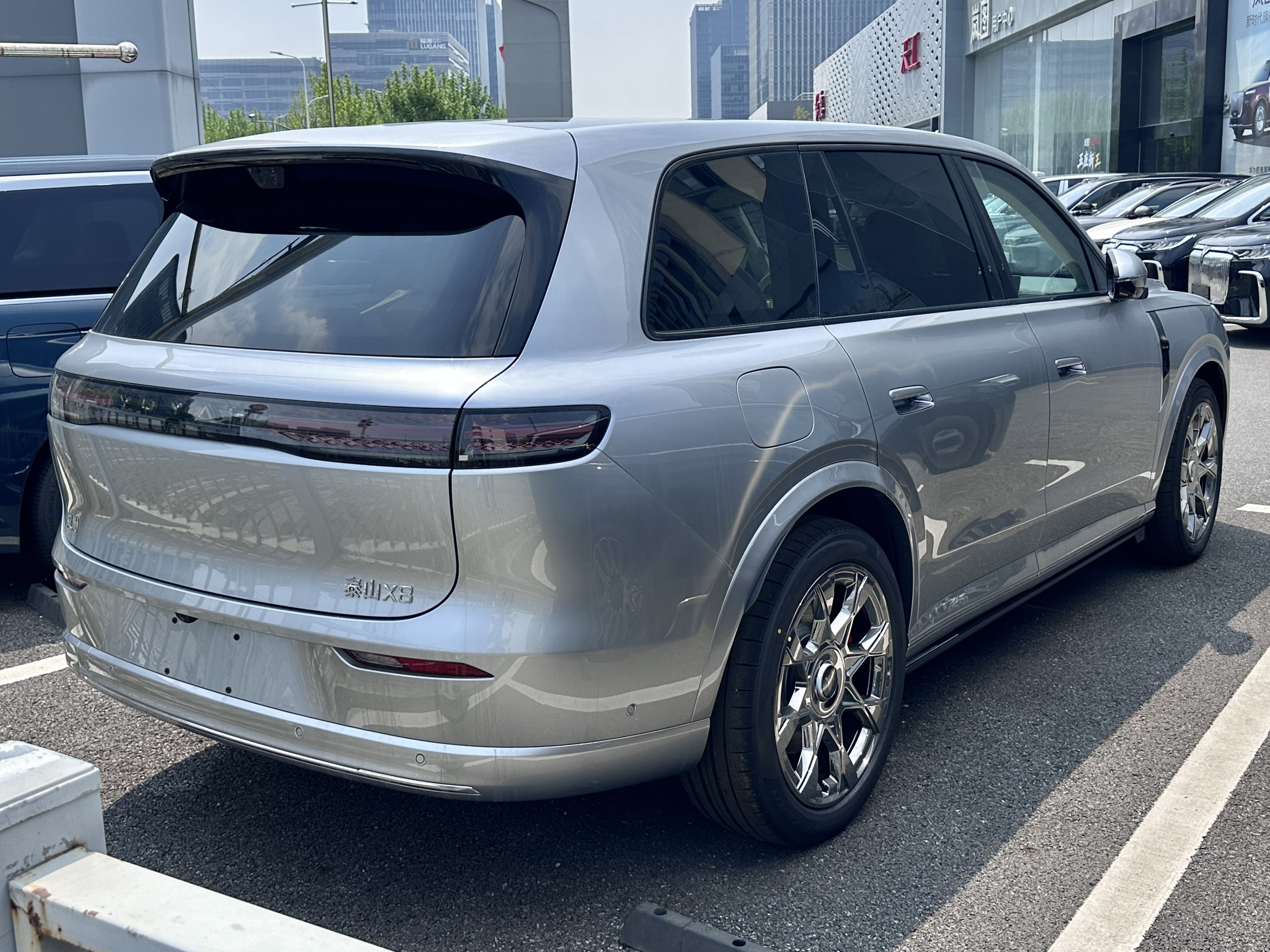
Rear view

== Powertrain and chassis ==
=== Taishan ===
The Taishan uses a plug-in hybrid system consisting of a 1.5 liter turbocharged inline 4 gasoline engine codenamed DFMC15TE3 producing 147 horsepower paired with two electric motors. The front electric motor makes 201 horsepower and the rear electric motor makes 308 horsepower. The overall power output of the Taishan is 657 horsepower. The battery used is a 65 kWh ternary NMC battery produced by CATL. An 800-volt architecture enables the Taishan to change from 20% to 80% in 12 minutes.

=== Taishan X8 ===
==== Plug-in hybrid ====
As with the Taishan, the PHEV version of the Taishan X8 also uses a 1.5 liter turbocharged engine with the same power output and two electric motors. The difference between the Taishan and the Taishan X8 is that the Taishan X8 is available with two power outputs. The low output version initially made 489 horsepower (365 kW; 496 PS) and was reported to use a 44.5 kWh lithium iron phosphate battery supplied by Sunwoda. The high output Taishan X8 initially made 510 horsepower (380 kW; 520 PS) and was reported to the same battery as the regular Taishan.

On May 22, 2026, the same day of the X8's launch, the low output version's power output was updated to 637 horsepower (475 kW; 646 PS), with the high-output version's output also updated to 657 horsepower (490 kW; 666 PS), the same output as the regular Taishan. With the launch, the Taishan X8 PHEV's total range was also upgrade to up to 936 miles (1,506 km).

==== Battery electric ====
A battery electric version of the Taishan X8 will be available compared to the regular Taishan. The electric range with the 98 kWh battery is 375 miles (604 km) and 452 miles (727 km) with the 120 kWh battery. It produces 637 horsepower (475 kW; 646 PS), with the front motor making 235 horsepower (175 kW; 238 PS) and the rear motor making 402 horsepower (300 kW; 408 PS). It can charge from 20% to 80% in 10 minutes.

=== Suspension ===
The Taishan and Taishan X8 use front double-wishbone suspension and rear independent multi-link suspension with three-chamber air suspension, four-wheel steering with the rear wheels able to turn 16 degrees, and has 4.13 inches (105 mm) of ride height adjustment.

== Sales ==
On May 6, 2026, Voyah announced the Taishan X8 had received 40,000 orders after pre-sales opened 13 days earlier.

| Year | China |
|---|---|
| 2025 | 3,990 |
